= List of herbaria =

This is a list of active herbaria, organized first by continent where the herbarium is located, then within each continent by size of the collection. The list is based on the Index Herbariorum, a global directory of herbaria and their associated staff.

== Background ==
A herbarium (plural "herbaria") is a collection of preserved plant specimens. These specimens may be whole plants or plant parts: these will usually be in a dried form, mounted on a sheet, but depending upon the material may also be kept in alcohol or other preservative. The same term is often used in mycology to describe an equivalent collection of preserved fungi and in phycology to describe a collection of algae. To preserve their form and color, plants collected in the field are spread flat on sheets of newsprint and dried, usually in a plant press, between blotters or absorbent paper. The specimens, which are then mounted on sheets of stiff white paper, are labeled with all essential data, such as collector, date and place found, description of the plant, elevation, and special habitat conditions. The sheet is then placed in a protective case. As a precaution against insect damage, the pressed plant is frozen or poisoned and the case disinfected. Most herbaria use a standard system of organizing their specimens into herbarium cases. Specimen sheets are stacked in groups by the species to which they belong and placed into a large lightweight folder that is labelled on the bottom edge. Groups of species folders are then placed together into larger, heavier folders by genus. The genus folders are then sorted by taxonomic family according to the standard system selected for use by the herbarium and placed into pigeonholes in herbarium cabinets.

Herbaria are essential for the study of plant taxonomy, the study of geographic distributions, and the stabilizing of nomenclature. Herbaria also preserve an historical record of change in vegetation over time. In some cases, plants become extinct in one area, or may become extinct altogether. In such cases, specimens preserved in an herbarium can represent the only record of the plant's original distribution. Environmental scientists make use of such data to track changes in climate and human impact.

== Africa ==
ABHCH - Laboratory of Natural Resource Valorisation, SNV Faculty, Setif 1 University (Setif, Algeria), AL - Université d'Alger (Alger, Algeria), BNRH - National Herbarium of Rwanda (Kigali, Rwanda), BOL - Bolus Herbarium, University of Cape Town (Cape Town, South Africa), CHUG - Garyounis University (Benghazi, Libya), EA - East African Herbarium (Nairobi, Kenya), ECWP - Emirates Centre for Wildlife Propagation (Missour, Morocco), ENSA - Ecole Nationale Supérieure d'Agronomie (Alger, Algérie) FHI - Forestry Research Institute of Nigeria Herbarium (Ibadan, Nigeria), FHO - University of Ghana Herbarium (Legon, Ghana), GDB - Gérard de Bélair private herbarium (Annaba / Alger, Algérie), IAV - Institut Agronomique et Vétérinaire Hassan II (Rabat, Morocco), INAT - Institut National d'Agronomie de Tunisie (Tunis, Tunisia), IRABS - Arid Regions Institute (Medenide, Tunisia), K - National Herbarium of Malawi (Blantyre, Malawi), KHAM - Hamid Khamar Herbarium (Rabat, Morocco), MARK - Cadi Ayyad University (Marrakech, Morocco), MO - National Herbarium of Tanzania (Arusha, Tanzania), PRE - University of Pretoria Herbarium (Pretoria, South Africa), RAB - Institut Scientifique (Rabat, Morocco), RAU - Laboratoire de Biologie Végétale (Rabat, Morocco), TUN - Université de Tunis (Tunis, Tunisia), ULT - Al-Faateh University (Tripoli, Libya).

Egypt: CAIM - Agricultural Research Center (Cairo, Egypt), CAIA - Ain Shams University (Cairo, Egypt), CAI - Cairo University (Cairo, Egypt), CAIH - Desert Research Center, Mataria (Cairo, Egypt), DAM - Damietta University (New Damietta, Egypt), CAIRC - National Research Centre (Cairo, Egypt), TANE - Tanta University (Tanta, Egypt), SHG - Sohag University (Dohag, Egypt), ASTU - Assiut University (Assiut, Egypt), ALEX - Alexandria University Herbarium (Alexandria, Egypt), SCUI - Suez Canal University (Ismalia, Egypt), SUH - Sohag University (Sohag, Egypt), MAZHAR - Mazhar Botanic Garden (Giza Governorate, Egypt), BRPP - Botanica Royal Park of Palm Hills (Cairo, Egypt), HEU - Faculty of science Helwan university (Cairo, Egypt), NVU - Faculty of Science New Valley University (El- Kharga, Egypt), KFSUH - Faculty of Science, Kafr Elsheikh University (Kafr El-Sheikh, Egypt), ASUE - Faculty of Science, Ain Shams University (Cairo, Egypt), MANS - Faculty of Pharmacy, Mansoura University (Mansoura city, Egypt), AUCH - The American University in Cairo (Cairo, Egypt), ASW - Aswan University (Aswan, Egypt), QNA - Qena University (Qena, Egypt), SUMCC - Sohag University (Sohag, Egypt), MANSH - Mansoura University (Mansoura, Egypt).

== Asia ==
Name	No. Specimens	Code	Location	Link
Chinese National Herbarium, (Chinese Academy of Sciences)	2,470,000	PE	China; Xiangshan, Beijing	
Central National Herbarium, (Botanical Survey of India)	2,000,000	CAL	India; Kolkata, West Bengal	
Herbarium Bogoriense (Indonesian Institute of Sciences)	2,000,000	BO	Indonesia; Bogor, West Java	
University of Tokyo	1,700,000	TI	Japan; Tokyo	
National Museum of Nature and Science	1,500,000	TNS	Japan; Tsukuba, Ibaraki Prefecture	
Kyoto University	1,200,000	KYO	Japan; Kyoto, Kyoto Prefecture	
Kunming Institute of Botany, Chinese Academy of Sciences	1,110,000	KUN	China; Kunming, Yunnan	
Georgian Academy of Sciences	1,000,000	TBI	Georgia; Tbilisi	
National Academy of Science, Uzbekistan	1,000,000	TASH	Uzbekistan; Tashkent	
South China Botanical Garden	1,000,000	IBSC	China; Guangzhou, Guangdong	
Hebrew University	700,000	HUJ	Israel; Jerusalem	
Institute of Botany, Jiangsu Province and Chinese Academy of Sciences	700,000	NAS	China; Nanjing, Jiangsu	
National Center for Natural Sciences and Technology	700,000	HN	Vietnam; Hanoi	
Institute of Tropical Biology	150,000	VNM	Vietnam; Ho Chi Minh City	
North West Agriculture and Forestry University	550,000	WUK	China; Yangling, Shaanxi	
Institute of Applied Ecology, Academia Sinica	520,000	IFP	China; Shenyang, Liaoning	
Institute of Biology and Soil Science, Far Eastern Branch, Russian Academy of Sciences	500,000	VLA	Russia; Vladivostok	
Institute of Botany of the National Academy of Sciences of Armenia	500,000	ERE	Armenia; Yerevan	
Tomsk State University, P. N. Krylov Herbarium	500,000	TK	Russia; Tomsk	
Tohoku University	485,000	TUS	Japan; Sendai, Miyagi Prefecture	
Sichuan University	450,000	SZ	China; Chengdu, Sichuan	
Tokyo Metropolitan University	450,000	MAK	Japan; Tokyo	
Academy of Sciences of Azerbaijan	400,000	BAK	Azerbaijan; Baku	
Guangxi Institute of Botany	400,000	IBK	China; Guilin, Guangxi Zhuang Autonomous Region	
Hattori Botanical Laboratory	400,000	NICH	Japan; Nichinan, Miyazaki Prefecture	
Hiroshima University	400,000	HIRO	Japan; Hiroshima, Hiroshima Prefecture	
National Academy of Science, Kyrgyzstan	400,000	FRU	Kyrgyzstan; Bishkek	
Dehradun Herbarium, Forest Research Institute (India)	340,000	DD	India; Dehra Dun, Uttar Pradesh	
M. Utemisov Western Kazakhstanian State University	340,000	PPIU	Kazakhstan; Uralsk	
Altai State University, South-Siberian Botanical Garden	300,000	ALTB	Russia; Barnaul	
Central Siberian Botanical Garden	300,000	NS, NSK	Russia; Novosibirsk	
Ministry of Science, Academy of Sciences	300,000	AA	Kazakhstan; Alma-Ata	
Natural History Museum and Institute	300,000	CBM	Japan; Chiba, Chiba Prefecture	
Osaka Museum of Natural History	300,000	OSA	Japan; Osaka, Osaka Prefecture	
Seoul National University	300,000	SNU	South Korea; Seoul	
Wuhan University	300,000	WH	China; Wuhan, Hubei	
Chongqing Municipal Academy of Chinese Materia Medica	296,000	SM	China; Chongqing, Sichuan	
Taiwan Forestry Research Institute	270,000	TAIF	Taiwan; Taipei	
Botanical Survey of India, Eastern Regional Centre	260,000	ASSAM	India; Shillong, Meghalaya	
Botanical Survey of India, Southern Regional Centre	260,000	MH	India; Coimbatore, Tamil Nadu	
Kanazawa University	250,000	KANA	Japan; Kanazawa, Ishikawa Prefecture	
National Taiwan University, Herbarium	250,000	TAI	Taiwan; Taipei	
National Botanical Research Institute, Council of Scientific and Industrial Research, India	250,000	LWG	India; Lucknow, Uttar Pradesh	
Northwest Plateau Institute of Biology, Chinese Academy of Sciences	220,000	HNWP	China; Xining, Qinghai	
Plant Pests and Diseases Research Institute	210,000	IRAN	Iran; Tehran	
Ankara University	200,000	ANK	Turkey; Ankara	
Botanical Institute of the Tajikistan Academy of Sciences	200,000	TAD	Tajikistan; Dushanbe	
Chengdu Institute of Biology	200,000	CDBI	China; Chengdu, Sichuan	
Guizhou Academy of Sciences	200,000	HGAS	China; Guiyang, Guizhou	
Hokkaido University	200,000	SAP	Japan; Sapporo, Hokkaido Prefecture	
Kochi Prefectural Makino Botanical Garden	200,000	MBK	Japan; Kochi, Kōchi Prefecture	
Blatter Herbarium	200,000	BLAT	India; Mumbai, Maharashtra	
Shinshu University	200,000	SHIN	Japan; Matsumoto, Nagano Prefecture	
Southwest Forestry College	200,000	SWFC	China; Kunming, Yunnan	
Wuhan Institute of Botany	200,000	HIB	China; Wuhan, Hubei	
Zhongshan (Sun Yatsen) University	200,000	SYS	China; Guangzhou, Guangdong	
National Herbarium and Plant laboratories	200,000	KATH	Nepal	
National Herbarium of Sri Lanka	160,000	LKA	Sri Lanka; Peradeniya, Kandy	
Nanjing University	150,000	N	China; Nanjing, Jiangsu	
Blatter Herbarium	150,000	BLAT	India; Maharashtra, Goa	
National Herbarium of Iran, Research Institute of Forests and Rangelands	140,000	TARI	Iran, Tehran	
Irkutsk State University	130,000	IRKU	Russia; Irkutsk	
Xishuangbanna Tropical Botanical Garden	125,000	HITBC	China; Xishuangbanna	
Botanical Survey of India, Northern Regional Centre	110,000	BSD	India; Dehradun, Uttarakhand	
National Herbarium, Islamabad	100,000	NHI	Pakistan; Islamabad	
Mongolian Academy of Sciences	100,000	UBA	Mongolia; Ulaanbaatar	
Forest Research, development and innovation agency	85,000	BPPI	Indonesia; Bogor, West Java	
Central Herbarium of Tehran University	75,000	TUH	Iran; Tehran	
Botanical Survey of India, Central Regional Centre	65,000	BSA	India; Allahabad, Uttar Pradesh	
Botanical Survey of India, Andaman & Nicobar Regional Centre	65,000	PBL	India; Port Blair, South Andaman Islands	
Andalas University	65,000	UA	Indonesia; Padang, West Sumatra	
Botanical Survey of India, Sikkim Himalaya Regional Centre	60,000	BSHC	India; Gangtok, Sikkim	
Calicut University Herbarium	60,000	CALI	India; Calicut, Kerala	
Bogor Botanical Garden	50,000	KBR	Indonesia; Bogor, West Java	
Hong Kong Herbarium	46,100	HK	Hong Kong	
Agharkar Research Institute	28,000	AHMA	India; Pune, Maharashtra	
Institute of Forest Genetics and Tree Breeding	26,000	FRC	India; Coimbatore, Tamil Nadu	
Botanical Survey of India, Arid Zone Regional Centre	25,000	BSJO	India; Jodhpur, Rajastan	
Jeju National University	24,000	JNUB	South Korea; Jeju	
French Institute of Pondicherry	22,000	HIFP	India; Pondicherry, Puducherry	
Botanical Survey of India, Industrial Section of Indian Museum	22,000	BSIS	India; Kolkota, West Bengal	
Centre of Ecological Sciences (Indian Institute of Science)	16,000	JCB	India; Bengaluru, Karnataka	
Botanical Survey of India, Arunachal Pradesh Regional Centre	15,000	ARUN	India; Itanagar, Arunachal Pradesh	
Tropical Botanic Garden and Research Institute	15,000	TBGT	India; Thiruvananthapuram, Kerala,	
North Bengal University Herbarium	12,000	NBU	India; Siliguri, West Bengal	
Kerala Forest Research Institute	12,000	KFRI	India; Trissur, Kerala	
Botanical Survey of India, Deccan Regional Centre	11,000	BSID	India; Hyderabad, Telangana	
Sree Narayana College Herbarium	8,500	SNCH	India; Kollam, Kerala	
Herbarium Malangensis	6,901	MALG	Indonesia; East Java, Malang	
Botanical Survey of India, High Altitude Western Himalayan Regional Centre	5000	BSS	India; Solan, Himachal Pradesh	

== Australasia and Oceania ==
Name	No. Specimens	Code	Location	Link
Royal Botanic Gardens, National Herbarium of Victoria	1,562,000	MEL	Australia; South Yarra, Melbourne, Victoria	
Australian National Herbarium	1,328,000	CANB	Australia; Canberra, A. C. T.	
Royal Botanic Gardens, National Herbarium of New South Wales	1,000,000	NSW	Australia; Sydney, New South Wales	
State Herbarium of South Australia	1,030,000	AD	Australia; Adelaide, South Australia	
Singapore Botanic Gardens	750,000	SING	Singapore	
Queensland Herbarium	730,000	BRI	Australia; Brisbane, Queensland	
Western Australian Herbarium	640,000	PERTH	Australia; Western Australia	
Bishop Museum, Herbarium Pacificum	600,000	BISH	United States; Honolulu, Hawaii	
Landcare Research New Zealand Limited, Allan Herbarium	800,000	CHR	New Zealand; Lincoln	
Auckland War Memorial Museum	330,000	AK	New Zealand; Auckland	
Papua New Guinea Forest Research Institute, Papua New Guinea National Herbarium	300,000	LAE	Papua New Guinea; Lae	
Tasmanian Museum and Art Gallery, Herbarium	300,000	HO	Australia; Hobart, Tasmania	
Forest Research Institute Malaysia	250,000	KEP	Malaysia; Kepong, Selangor	
Forest Research Center	230,000	SAN	Malaysia; Sandakan, Sabah	
Museum of New Zealand	230,000	WELT	New Zealand; Wellington	
Northern Territory Herbarium	200,000	DNA	Australia; Palmerston, Northern Territory	
Philippine National Herbarium	180,000	PNH	Philippines; Manila	
Sarawak Herbarium	160,000	SAR	Malaysia; Kuching, Sarawak	
Australian Tropical Herbarium	150,000	CNS	Australia; Cairns, Queensland	
University of Melbourne Herbarium	130,000	MELU	Australia; Parkville, Victoria	
Orange Agricultural Institute, Plant Pathology Herbarium	95,000	DAR	Australia; Orange, New South Wales	
N.C.W. Beadle Herbarium, University of New England	90,000	NE	Australia; Armidale, New South Wales	
Herbarium of IRD Nouméa	85,000	NOU	New Caledonia; Nouméa	
Queensland Plant Pathology Herbarium	84,000	BRIP	Australia; Brisbane, Queensland	
Otago Regional Herbarium, University of Otago	72,000	OTA	New Zealand; Dunedin	
National Tropical Botanical Garden	50,000	PTBG	United States; Kalaheo, Kauai, Hawaii	
University of the South Pacific	40,000	SUVA	Fiji; Suva	
Solomon Islands National Herbarium	35,000	BSIP	Solomon Islands; Honiara	
New Zealand Institute for Bioeconomy Science, National Forestry Herbarium	35,000	NZFRI	New Zealand; Rotorua	
University of Waikato Herbarium	22,000	WAIK	New Zealand; Hamilton	
Herbarium of Vanuatu	20,000	PVNH	Vanuatu; Port-Vila	
Musée de Tahiti et des Îles	15,000	PAP	French Polynesia; Punaauia, Tahiti	

== Europe ==
Name	No. Specimens	Code	Location	Link
Muséum National d'Histoire Naturelle	9,500,000	P, PC	France; Paris	
Komarov Botanical Institute (Ботанический институт имени В.Л. Комарова)	7,160,000	LE	Russia; St. Petersburg	
Kew Herbarium	7,000,000	K	United Kingdom; Kew, England	
Conservatoire et Jardin botaniques de la Ville de Genève	6,000,000	G	Switzerland; Geneva	
Naturalis Biodiversity Center (Nationaal Herbarium Nederland)	5,700,000	AMD, L, U, WAG	Netherlands; Leiden	
British Museum of Natural History	5,200,000	BM	United Kingdom; London, England	
Naturhistorisches Museum Wien	5,000,000	W	Austria; Vienna	
Swedish Museum of Natural History (Naturhistoriska riksmuseet)	4,400,000	S	Sweden; Stockholm	
Meise Botanic Garden	4,000,000	BR	Belgium, Meise	
Université Montpellier	4,000,000	MPU	France; Montpellier	
Université Claude Bernard	4,000,000	LY	France; Lyon	
Herbarium Haussknecht Friedrich Schiller University Jena	3,500,000	JE	Germany, Jena	
Joint Herbarium of the University of Zurich and the ETH Zurich	3,500,000	Z+ZT	Switzerland, Zurich	
Botanischer Garten und Botanisches Museum Berlin-Dahlem, Zentraleinrichtung der Freien Universität Berlin	3,000,000	B	Germany, Berlin	
Finnish Museum of Natural History (University of Helsinki)	3,000,000	H	Finland, Helsinki	
Botanische Staatssammlung München	3,200,000	M	Germany, Munich	
University of Copenhagen	2,510,000	C	Denmark, Copenhagen	
Hungarian Natural History Museum - Department of Botany	2,000,000	BP	Budapest, Hungary	
Royal Botanic Garden, Edinburgh	2,000,000	E	United Kingdom; Edinburgh, Scotland	
Herbarium Hamburgense	1,800,000	HBG	Germany, Hamburg	
Senckenberg Research Institute, Frankfurt	1,200,000	FR	Germany, Frankfurt	
Moscow State University (Московский государственный университет)	1,011,253	MW	Russia; Moscow	,
University of Cambridge	1,000,000	CGE	United Kingdom; Cambridge, England	
University of Manchester	1,000,000	MANCH	United Kingdom; Manchester, England	
Fielding-Druce Herbarium, University of Oxford	1,000,000	OXF	United Kingdom; Oxford, England	
Real Jardín Botánico	850,000	MA	Spain; Madrid	
Universität Göttingen	800,000	GOET	Germany; Göttingen	
Władysław Szafer Institute of Botany, Polish Academy of Sciences	800,000	IB PAN	Poland; Kraków	
University of Coimbra	800,000	COI	Portugal; Coimbra	
Institut Botànic de Barcelona	700,000	BC	Spain; Barcelona	
Muséum d'Histoire Naturelle de Grenoble	700,000	GRM	France; Grenoble	
Saint Petersburg University (Санкт-Петербургский государственный университет)	700,000	LECB	Russia; Saint Petersburg	
National Botanic Gardens, Ireland	600,000	DBN	Ireland; Dublin	
Main Botanical Garden, Russia (Главный ботанический сад имени Н.В. Цицина)	570,000	MHA	Russia; Moscow	
Herbiers universitaires de Clermont-Ferrand	550,000	CLF	France; Clermont-Ferrand	
National Museum Wales	550,000	NMW	United Kingdom; Cardiff, Wales	
N. I. Vavilov Institute of Plant Industry (Всероссийский институт растениеводства имени Н.И. Вавилова)	524,000	WIR	Russia; Saint Petersburg	
General Herbarium of the Balkan Peninsula, Natural History Museum of Serbia	490,000	BEO	Serbia; Belgrade	
Muséum d'Histoire Naturelle d'Aix-en-Provence	420,000	AIX	France; Aix-en-Provence	
Muséum d'Histoire Naturelle	400,000	AUT	France; Autun	
Muséum Requien	400,000	AV	France; Avignon	
Université de Liège	400,000	LG	Belgium; Liège	
University of Reading	400,000	RNG	UK; Reading, England	
CABI Bioscience UK Centre	385,000	IMI	United Kingdom; Surrey, England	
Jardin Botanique de la Ville de Bordeaux	350,000	BORD	France; Bordeaux	
Herbarium Horti Botanici Pisani	350,000	PI	Italy; Pisa	
World Museum Liverpool	350,000	LIV	United Kingdom; Liverpool, England	
South Federal University (Южный Федеральный университет)	328,000	RV, RWBG	Russia; Rostov-on-Don	
Arboretum Gaston Allard	300,000	ANG	France; Angers	
Jevremovac Botanic Garden	300,000	BEOU	Serbia; Belgrade	
Daubeny Herbarium, University of Oxford	300,000	FHO	United Kingdom; Oxford, England	
Institut de Botanique	300,000	STR	France; Strasbourg	
Instituto de Investigação Científica Tropical	300,000	LISC	Portugal; Lisbon	
Université Paul Sabatier	300,000	TL	France; Toulouse	
Universitat de Barcelona	300,000	BCN	Spain; Barcelona	
Universitat de Sevilla	300,000	SEV	Spain; Seville	
Budakeszi Herbarium - International Dendrological Foundation	250,000	BK	Hungary; Budakeszi	
Université Libre de Bruxelles	215,000	BRLU	Belgium; Brussels	
Agricultural University - Plovdiv (Аграрен университет - Пловдив)	150,000	SOA	Bulgaria; Plovdiv	
Royal Horticultural Society (RHS Garden Wisley)	140,000	WSY	United Kingdom; Wisley, England	

== North America ==
Includes herbaria in Central America and the West Indies.

Name	No. Specimens	Code	Location	Link
New York Botanical Garden	7,800,000	NY	United States; The Bronx, New York City, New York	
Missouri Botanical Garden	6,600,000	MO	United States; St. Louis, Missouri	
Harvard University Herbaria	5,005,000	A, AMES, ECON, FH, GH, NEBC	United States; Cambridge, Massachusetts	
United States National Herbarium, Smithsonian Institution	5,000,000	US	United States; Washington, D.C.	
Field Museum	2,700,000	F	United States; Chicago, Illinois	
University and Jepson Herbaria, University of California, Berkeley	2,200,000	UC/JEPS	United States; Berkeley, California	
California Academy of Sciences Herbarium	2,300,000	CAS/DS	United States; San Francisco, California	
University of Michigan Herbarium	1,750,000	MICH	United States; Ann Arbor, Michigan	
Academy of Natural Sciences of Drexel University	1,430,000	PH	United States; Philadelphia, Pennsylvania	
Agriculture and Agri-Food Canada, Vascular Plant Herbarium	1,335,000	DAO, DAOM	Canada; Ottawa, Ontario	
Wisconsin State Herbarium, University of Wisconsin–Madison	1,200,750	WIS	United States; Madison, Wisconsin	
Universidad Nacional Autónoma de México	1,120,000	MEXU	Mexico; Mexico City	
Rancho Santa Ana Botanic Garden	1,100,000	RSA/POM	United States; Claremont, California	
University of Texas at Austin	1,006,000	TEX	United States; Austin, Texas	
Botanical Research Institute of Texas	1,548,000	BRIT-SMU-VDB	United States; Fort Worth, Texas	
Instituto Politécnico Nacional, Mexico	950,000	ENCB	Mexico; Mexico City	
L.H. Bailey Hortorium Herbarium, Cornell University	860,000	BH	United States; Ithaca, New York	
Royal Ontario Museum	860,000	TRT, TRTC	Canada; Toronto, Ontario	
Herbier Marie-Victorin, Université de Montréal	850,000	MT	Canada; Montreal, Quebec	
National Herbarium of Canada, Canadian Museum of Nature	838,000	CAN, CANM	Canada; Ottawa, Ontario	
Rocky Mountain Herbarium, University of Wyoming	806,800	RM	United States; Laramie, Wyoming	
United States National Arboretum Herbarium	800,000	NA	United States; Washington, D.C.	
Herbier Louis-Marie, Université Laval	770,000	ULF	Canada; Quebec City, Quebec	
University of North Carolina Herbarium	800,000	NCU	United States; Chapel Hill, North Carolina	
Stanley L. Welsh Herbarium, Brigham Young University	661,100	BRY	United States; Provo, Utah	
University of Washington Herbarium	650,000	WTU	United States; Seattle, Washington	
University of Tennessee Herbarium, University of Tennessee, Knoxville	650,000	TENN	United States; Knoxville, Tennessee	
University of British Columbia Herbarium	560,000	UBC	Canada; Vancouver, British Columbia	
The Ohio State University Herbarium	500,000	OS	United States; Columbus, Ohio	
University of Florida Herbarium, Florida Museum of Natural History	470,000	FLAS	United States; Gainesville, Florida	
Instituto de Ecología y Sistemática Herbarium	400,000	HAC	Cuba; Havana	
Marion Ownbey Herbarium, Washington State University	380,000	WS	United States; Pullman, Washington	
Yale University Herbarium, Yale Peabody Museum of Natural History	365,000	YU	United States; New Haven, Connecticut	
University of Alberta Herbarium	320,000	ALTA	Canada; Edmonton, Alberta	
Pringle Herbarium, University of Vermont	310,400	VT	United States; Burlington, Vermont	
Instituto de Ecología, A.C. Herbarium	310,000	XAL	Mexico; Xalapa, Veracruz	
UC Davis Center for Plant Diversity Herbarium	300,000	DAV; DAVH; AHUC	United States; Davis, California	
University of Georgia Herbarium	278,000	GA; GAM	United States; Athens, Georgia	
University of Alaska Museum of the North Herbarium, University of Alaska, Fairbanks	270,000	ALA	United States; Fairbanks, Alaska	
Milwaukee Public Museum Herbarium	250,000	MIL	United States; Milwaukee, Wisconsin	
Paul C. Standley Herbarium, Escuela Agrícola Panamericana	240,000	EAP	Honduras; Tegucigalpa	
University of South Florida Herbarium	235,000	USF	United States; Florida	
Robert K. Godfrey Herbarium, Florida State University	220,000	FSU	United States; Tallahassee, Florida	
Herbario Nacional de Costa Rica, Museo Nacional de Costa Rica	215,000	CR	Costa Rica; San José	
E.C. Smith Herbarium, Acadia University	200,000	ACAD	Canada; Wolfville, Nova Scotia	
Intermountain Herbarium, Utah State University	260,000	UTC	Utah; Logan, Utah	
Robert W. Freckmann Herbarium, University of Wisconsin–Stevens Point	200,000	UWSP	Stevens Point	
Stillinger Herbarium, University of Idaho	200,000	ID	Moscow	

== South America ==
Name	No. Specimens	Code	Location	Link
Jardim Botânico do Rio de Janeiro	837,000	RB	Brazil; Rio de Janeiro, Rio de Janeiro	
Fundación Miguel Lillo	700,000	LIL	Argentina; Tucumán	
Universidad de Buenos Aires	700,000	BAA, BAF	Argentina; Buenos Aires	
Instituto de Botánica Darwinion	650,000	SI	Argentina; Buenos Aires	
Universidade Federal do Rio de Janeiro	520,000	R	Brazil; Rio de Janeiro, Rio de Janeiro	
Museo de La Plata	500,000	LP	Argentina; Buenos Aires	
Herbario Nacional Colombiano, Universidad Nacional de Colombia	500,000	COL	Colombia; Bogotá	;
Universidad Nacional Mayor de San Marcos	500,000	USM	Peru; Lima	
Instituto Nacional de Tecnología Agropecuaria	480,000	BAB	Argentina; Buenos Aires	
Museu Botânico Municipal	450,000	MBM	Brazil; Curitiba, Paraná	
Fundación Instituto Botánico de Venezuela	400,000	VEN	Venezuela; Caracas	
Instituto de Botánica del Nordeste	400,000	CTES	Argentina; Corrientes	
Instituto de Botânica	400,000	SP	Brazil; São Paulo, São Paulo	
Universidad Nacional de Córdoba	320,000	CORD	Argentina; Córdoba	
Universidade de Brasília	230,000	UB	Brazil; Brasília, Distrito Federal	
Instituto Nacional de Pesquisas da Amazônia	205,000	INPA	Brazil; Manaus, Amazonas	
Pontificia Universidad Católica del Ecuador	200,000	QCA	Ecuador; Quito	
Universidad de Concepción	170,000	CONC	Chile; Concepción	
Embrapa Amazônia Oriental	165,000	IAN	Brazil; Belém, Pará	
Museu Paraense Emílio Goeldi	161,000	MG	Brazil; Belém, Pará	
Herbier de Guyane, Institut de recherche pour le développement (IRD)	160,000	CAY	French Guiana; Cayenne	
Universidad de Antioquia	160,000	HUA	Colombia; Medellín, Antioquia	
Museo Nacional de Historia Natural	145,000	SGO	Chile; Santiago	
Universidade Estadual de Campinas	143,000	UEC	Brazil; Campinas, São Paulo	
Universidade Federal do Rio Grande do Sul	140,000	ICN	Brazil; Porto Alegre, Rio Grande do Sul	
Museo Ecuatoriano de Ciencias Naturales	130,000	QCNE	Ecuador; Quito	
Universidade de São Paulo	126,000	SPF	Brazil; São Paulo, São Paulo	
Instituto Anchietano de Pesquisas/UNISINOS	120,000	PACA	Brazil; São Leopoldo, Rio Grande do Sul	
Fundação Zoobotânica do Rio Grande do Sul	108,000	HAS	Brazil; Porto Alegre, Rio Grande do Sul	
Universidade Estadual de Feira de Santana	108,000	HUEFS	Brazil; Feira de Santana, Bahia	
Universidade Federal de Minas Gerais	107,000	BHCB	Brazil; Belo Horizonte, Minas Gerais	
Herbario del Oriente Boliviano, Museo de Historia Natural Noel Kempff Mercado - Universidad Autónoma Gabriel René Moreno	100,000	USZ	Bolivia; Santa Cruz de la Sierra	
Herbario Nacional de Bolivia	100,000	LPB	Bolivia; La Paz	
Museo Nacional de Historia Natural, Universidad de la República	90,000	MVM, MVFA	Uruguay; Montevideo	
Departamento de Botânica, Federal University of Paraná	80,000	UPCB	Brazil, Paraná, Curitiba	
Departamento de Botánica, Facultad de Ciencias Químicas, Universidad Nacional de Asunción	80,000	FCQ	Paraguay; San Lorenzo	
Universidad Nacional de la Amazonía Peruana	50,000	AMAZ	Peru; Iquitos	
Departamento de Botánica, Museo Nacional de Historia Natural del Paraguay	23,000	PY	Paraguay; San Lorenzo	
Pontifical Catholic University of Paraná	32,000	HUCP	Brazil, Paraná, Curitiba	HUCP
Herbario Universidad de Caldas, Universidad de Caldas	22,000	COL	Colombia; Manizales	

== See also ==
- List of botanical gardens
