= Sanjappa cynometroides =

Scientific classification
- Kingdom: Plantae
- Clade: Tracheophytes
- Clade: Angiosperms
- Clade: Eudicots
- Clade: Rosids
- Order: Fabales
- Family: Fabaceae
- Subfamily: Caesalpinioideae
- Clade: Mimosoid clade
- Tribe: Ingeae
- Genus: Sanjappa
- Species: S. cynometroides

Binomial name
- Sanjappa cynometroides (Bedd.) E.R.Souza & Krishnaraj (2016)

Synonyms
- Calliandra cynometroides Bedd. (1873); Feuilleea cynometroides (Bedd.) Kuntze (1891); Inga cynometroides (Bedd.) Baker (1878)

Genus of plants

Sanjappa cynometroides is a species of flowering plant in the family Fabaceae. It is a tree native to southwestern India.

The species was first described as Calliandra cynometroides by Richard Henry Beddome in 1873. In 2016 Élvia R. Souza and Moothedathu Krishnaraj placed it in the newly-described genus Sanjappa as Sanjappa cynometroides. The genus is named in honour of Dr. Munivenkatappa Sanjappa, former Director of the Botanical Survey of India.
