= Pimelea fugiens =

Scientific classification
- Kingdom: Plantae
- Clade: Tracheophytes
- Clade: Angiosperms
- Clade: Eudicots
- Clade: Rosids
- Order: Malvales
- Family: Thymelaeaceae
- Genus: Pimelea
- Species: P. fugiens

Binomial name
- Pimelea fugiens A.R.Bean

Species of shrub

Pimelea fugiens is a species of flowering plant in the family Thymelaeaceae and is endemic to central Queensland. It is a shrub with elliptic leaves and heads of 12 to 18 pale yellow, tube-shaped flowers.

== Description ==
Pimelea fugiens is a perennial shrub that typically grows to a height of 30–40 cm (12–16 in) and has sparsely hairy young stems. The leaves are arranged more or less in opposite pairs, elliptic, 15–33 mm (0.59–1.30 in) long and 5–12 mm (0.20–0.47 in) wide, on a petiole 0.7–1.2 mm (0.028–0.047 in) long. The upper surface of the leaves is more or less glabrous and the lower surface is sparsely hairy. The flowers are borne in leaf axils or on the ends of branches in heads of 12 to 18 on a densely hairy rachis 2–4 mm (0.079–0.157 in) long, the peduncle 8–28 mm (0.31–1.10 in) long, each flower on a pedicel 0.2–0.4 mm (0.0079–0.0157 in) long. The floral tube is 3.6–4.6 mm (0.14–0.18 in) long and pale yellow, the sepals 0.9–1.3 mm (0.035–0.051 in) long and hairy on the outside. Flowering has been observed in April, May and October.

== Taxonomy ==
Pimelea fugiens was first formally described in 2017 by Anthony Bean in the journal Austrobaileya from specimens he collected near Thangool in 2009. The specific epithet (fugiens) means "avoiding" or "averse to", and refers to the observation that cattle avoid eating the plant, and that it is likely to be toxic.

== Distribution and habitat ==
This pimelea is only known from two sites near Biloela, where it grows in dry gullies dominated by Melaleuca bracteata.

== Conservation status ==
Pimelea fugiens is listed as "critically endangered" under the Queensland Government Nature Conservation Act 1992.
