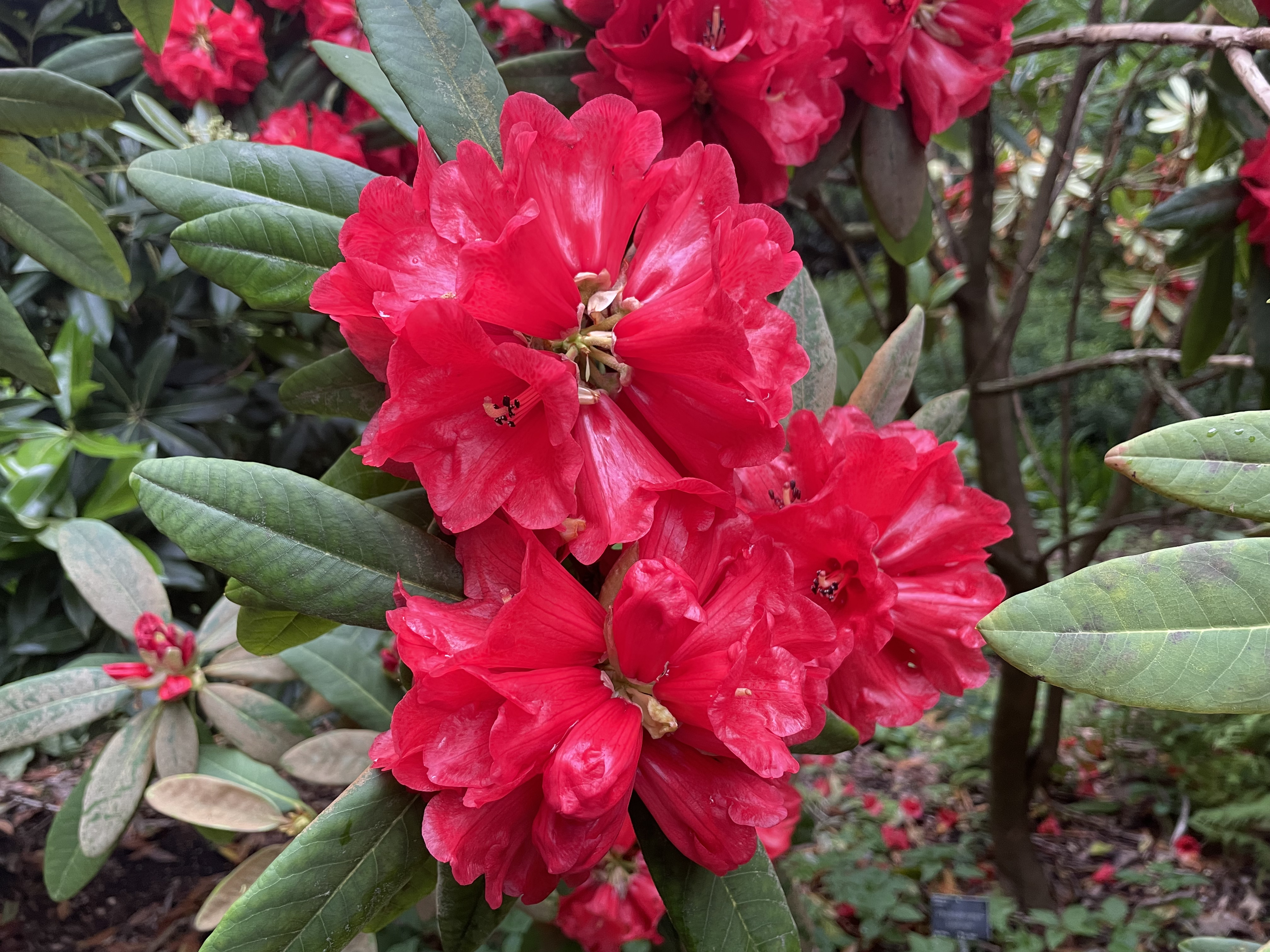

Scientific classification
- Kingdom: Plantae
- Clade: Tracheophytes
- Clade: Angiosperms
- Clade: Eudicots
- Clade: Asterids
- Order: Ericales
- Family: Ericaceae
- Genus: Rhododendron
- Species: R. facetum

Binomial name
- Rhododendron facetum Balf.f. & Kingdon-Ward

Synonyms
- Rhododendron eriogynum Balf.f. & W.W.Sm.

= Rhododendron facetum =

Species of plant

Rhododendron facetum (绵毛房杜鹃) is a species of flowering plant in the family Ericaceae. It is native to northeast Myanmar, northern Vietnam, and western Yunnan, China, where it grows at altitudes of 2,100–3,600 m (6,900–11,800 ft). It is a shrub or small tree that grows to 3–7 m in height, with leathery leaves that are oblong-elliptic to obovate-elliptic, 8.5–20 by 3–6 cm in size. Flowers are red with deeper colored spots.

== Etymology ==
Rhododendron means "rose tree", and is derived from the ancient Greek name for Nerium oleander.

Facetum means "elegant" or "fine".

== Gallery ==
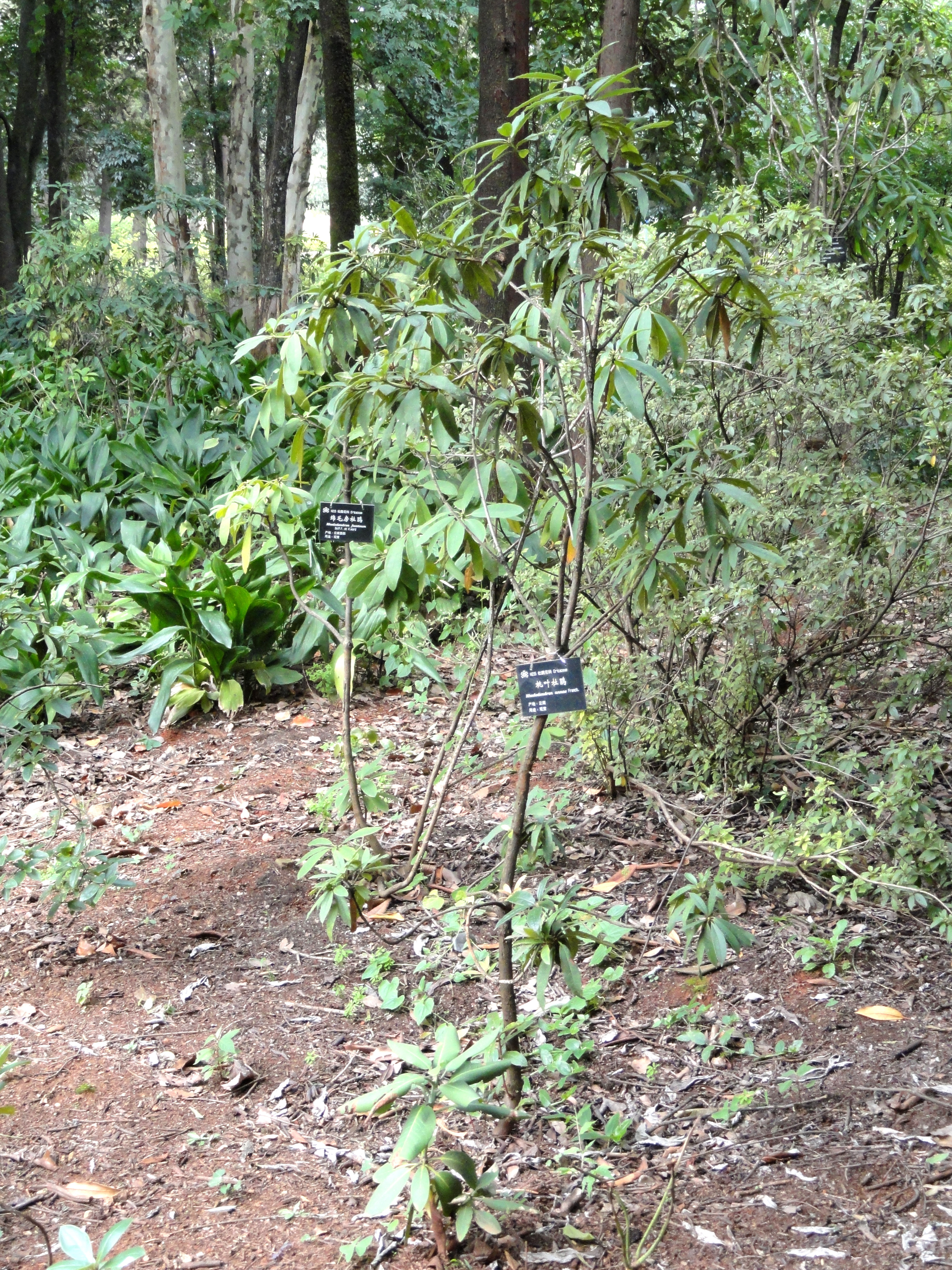
Rhododendron facetum at Kunming Botanical Garden

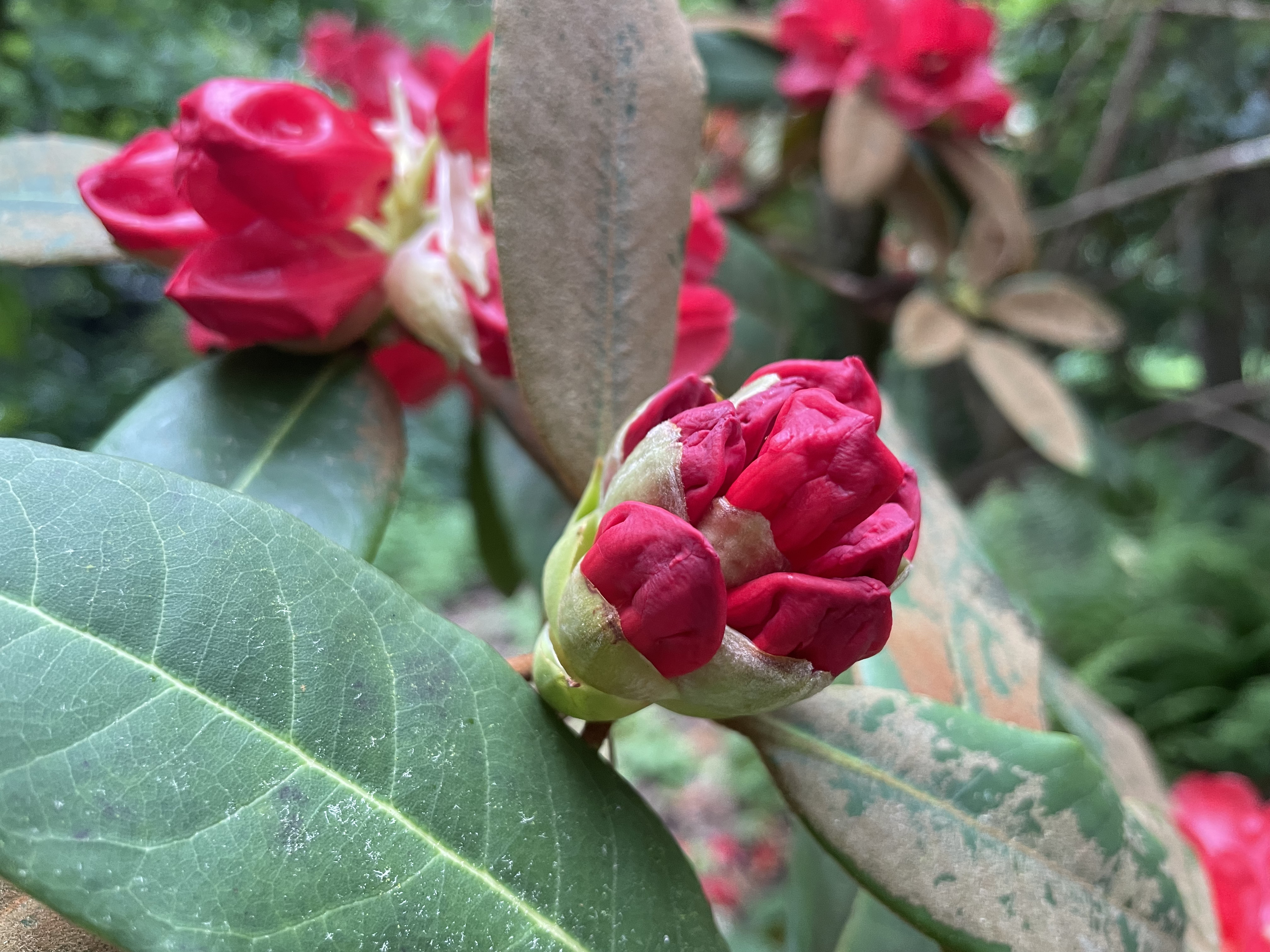
Rhododendron facetum flower buds at RHS Garden Wisley

== Sources ==
- "Rhododendron facetum", I. B. Balfour & Kingdon Ward, Notes Roy. Bot. Gard. Edinburgh. 10: 104. 1917.
