= Sanjappa =

Scientific classification
- Kingdom: Plantae
- Clade: Tracheophytes
- Clade: Angiosperms
- Clade: Eudicots
- Clade: Rosids
- Order: Fabales
- Family: Fabaceae
- Subfamily: Caesalpinioideae
- Clade: Mimosoid clade
- Tribe: Ingeae
- Genus: Sanjappa; E.R.Souza & Krishnaraj (2016)

Species
- Sanjappa cynometroides (Bedd.) E.R.Souza & Krishnaraj; Sanjappa vietnamica Thulin

Genus of plants

Sanjappa is a genus of flowering plants in the family Fabaceae. It contains two species:

- Sanjappa cynometroides (Bedd.) E.R.Souza & Krishnaraj – southwestern India.
- Sanjappa vietnamica Thulin – Vietnam

The genus is named in honour of Dr. Munivenkatappa Sanjappa, former Director of the Botanical Survey of India.
