= Alice Catherine Hughes =

Professor at the University of Hong Kong

- Known for: Editor-in-chief of Climate Change Ecology

Academic background
- Education: University of Southampton; University of Bristol

Academic work
- Institutions: Xishuangbanna Tropical Botanical Garden; University of Hong Kong
- Main interests: Biodiversity, bats, wildlife trade

Alice Catherine Hughes is a British professor. She is associate professor at the University of Hong Kong, and editor-in-chief of Elsevier's Climate Change Ecology journal. She is known for her research on biodiversity, including the effect of environmental change on some species, particularly bats, and the threat to many species from the wildlife trade.

== Early life and education ==
Alice Hughes spent some of her childhood in Norfolk, observing birds with her mother. In 2004 she gained a higher diploma in animal behaviour from the University of Southampton. Subsequently, she studied zoology at the University of Bristol, from where she graduated in 2007, and completed her PhD four years later.

== Career ==
In 2011 Hughes moved to Thailand, where she was a post-doctoral fellow at the Prince of Songkla University. The following year she gained a fellowship with the CSIRO in Canberra, Australia. Towards the end of 2013, she took up an appointment as assistant professor at the Xishuangbanna Tropical Botanical Garden, to research biodiversity, including the effect of environmental change on some species, particularly bats. She later wrote on the threats of the trade in wildlife, including the protection of bats in the Western Ghats, India.

In 2021 Hughes became associate professor of the School of Biological Sciences, University of Hong Kong. She became editor-in-chief of Elsevier's Climate Change Ecology journal in 2023.

== Selected publications ==
- Hughes, Alice C.; Satasook, Chutamas; Bates, Paul J. J.; Bumrungsri, Sara; Jones, Gareth (June 2012). "The projected effects of climatic and vegetation changes on the distribution and diversity of Southeast Asian bats". Global Change Biology. 18 (6): 1854–1865. Bibcode:2012GCBio..18.1854H. doi:10.1111/j.1365-2486.2012.02641.x. ISSN 1354-1013. (Co-author)
- Hughes, Alice C. (January 2017). "Understanding the drivers of S outheast Asian biodiversity loss". Ecosphere. 8 (1). Bibcode:2017Ecosp...8E1624H. doi:10.1002/ecs2.1624. ISSN 2150-8925.
- Marshall, Benjamin M.; Strine, Colin; Hughes, Alice C. (29 September 2020). "Thousands of reptile species threatened by under-regulated global trade". Nature Communications. 11 (1): 4738. Bibcode:2020NatCo..11.4738M. doi:10.1038/s41467-020-18523-4. ISSN 2041-1723. PMC 7525537. PMID 32994397. (Co-author)
- Hughes, Alice C.; Orr, Michael C.; Ma, Keping; Costello, Mark J.; Waller, John; Provoost, Pieter; Yang, Qinmin; Zhu, Chaodong; Qiao, Huijie (September 2021). "Sampling biases shape our view of the natural world". Ecography. 44 (9): 1259–1269. Bibcode:2021Ecogr..44.1259H. doi:10.1111/ecog.05926. hdl:2292/55902. ISSN 0906-7590. (Co-author)
- Hughes, Alice C. (11 October 2021). "Wildlife trade". Current Biology. 31 (19): R1218–R1224. Bibcode:2021CBio...31R1218H. doi:10.1016/j.cub.2021.08.056. ISSN 1879-0445. PMID 34637735.
- Raman, Sreehari; Shameer, Thekke Thumbath; Pooja, Ushakumari; Hughes, Alice C. (20 July 2022). "Identifying priority areas for bat conservation in the Western Ghats mountain range, peninsular India". Journal of Mammalogy. 104 (1): 49–61. doi:10.1093/jmammal/gyac060. (Co-author)
