= Sree Narayana College Herbarium =

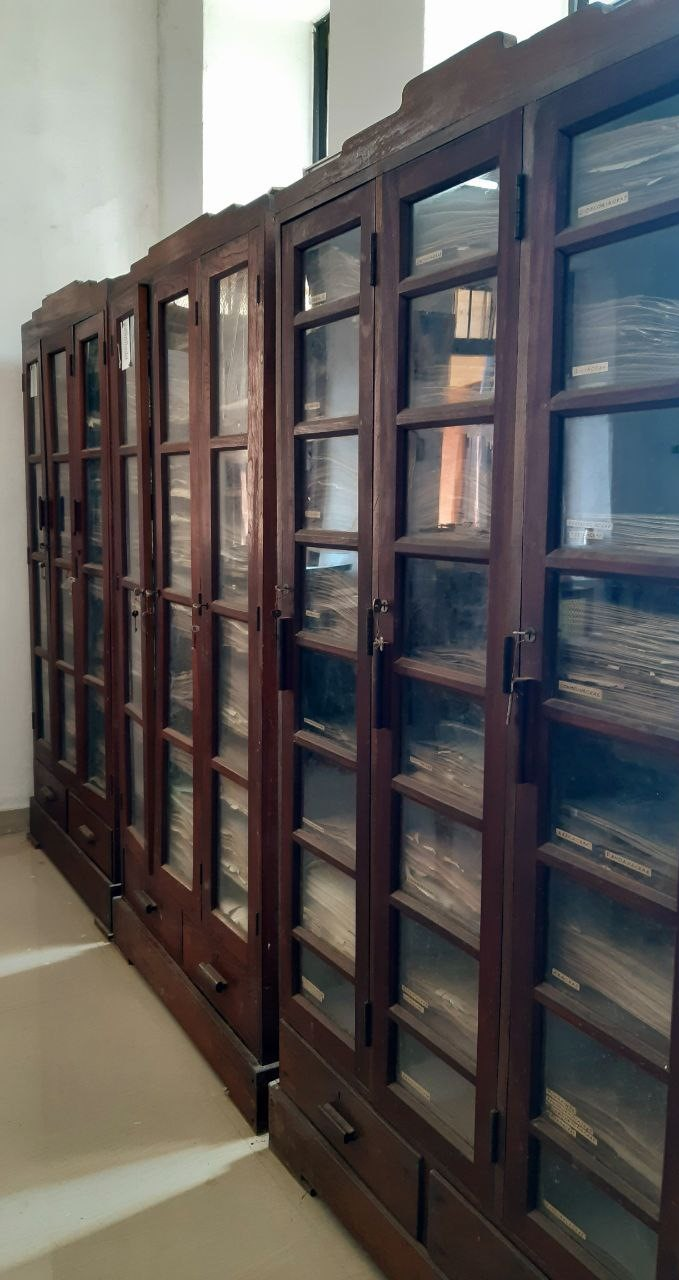
A view of Herbarium cabinets at SNCH

The Sree Narayana College Herbarium(Index Herbariorum code: SNCH) is situated at the Sree Narayana College, Kollam, in Kerala state, India. It is part of Department of Botany of the college, which established in 1949. It is responsible for discovering, describing, monitoring, modelling, surveying, naming and classifying Kerala's plants, and is the focus for information and research on the district flora of Kollam & Pathanamthitta.

The SNCH Herbarium is one of the largest herbarium collections in Kerala, housing approximately 7,000 specimens. Among these, about 3,500 specimens have been digitized and catalogued for database preparation up to 2023. The Herbarium operates an outreach programme called the Botanical Information Service (BIS), which functions as an extension activity of the Botany Department and offers facilities for plant authentication and voucher specimen submission to researchers and the public

== Origins ==
The SNCH herbarium underwent its first major expansion in 1985 with the initiation of a Botanical Survey of India–funded project on flowering plant diversity in Pathanamthitta District, carried out by Prof. N. Ravi and N. Anilkumar. This work resulted in the Flora of Pathanamthitta collection, comprising approximately 3,500 specimens. Subsequently, the SNCH holdings were further strengthened through a UGC minor research project on the taxonomy of Cyperaceae. Extensive field explorations conducted primarily in southern Kerala, along with specimen exchanges and gifts from eminent botanists such as D. Devarajan, K. Rajappan, and R. Vasudevan Nair, significantly enriched the collection. This phase contributed about 1,200 herbarium sheets. Professor Ravi also added numerous specimens from Kollam and Alappuzha districts, as well as several collections from Udagamandalam, Tamil Nadu. In addition, plant pathology specimens collected by R. Soundararaju were acquired through an exchange programme with the Agricultural College, Coimbatore. Collectively, the research efforts of N. Ravi and his collaborators led to the discovery of 32 plant species new to science and resulted in the publication of two books and 55 research articles.

Since 2016, the herbarium collection has been systematically maintained following the appointment of a Curator. In 2022, digitization of specimens was initiated, along with the commencement of the plant authentication process. As of 30 May 2025, the herbarium houses over 8,000 plant specimens, primarily collected from the southern Western Ghats region of Kerala.

== Physical facilities ==
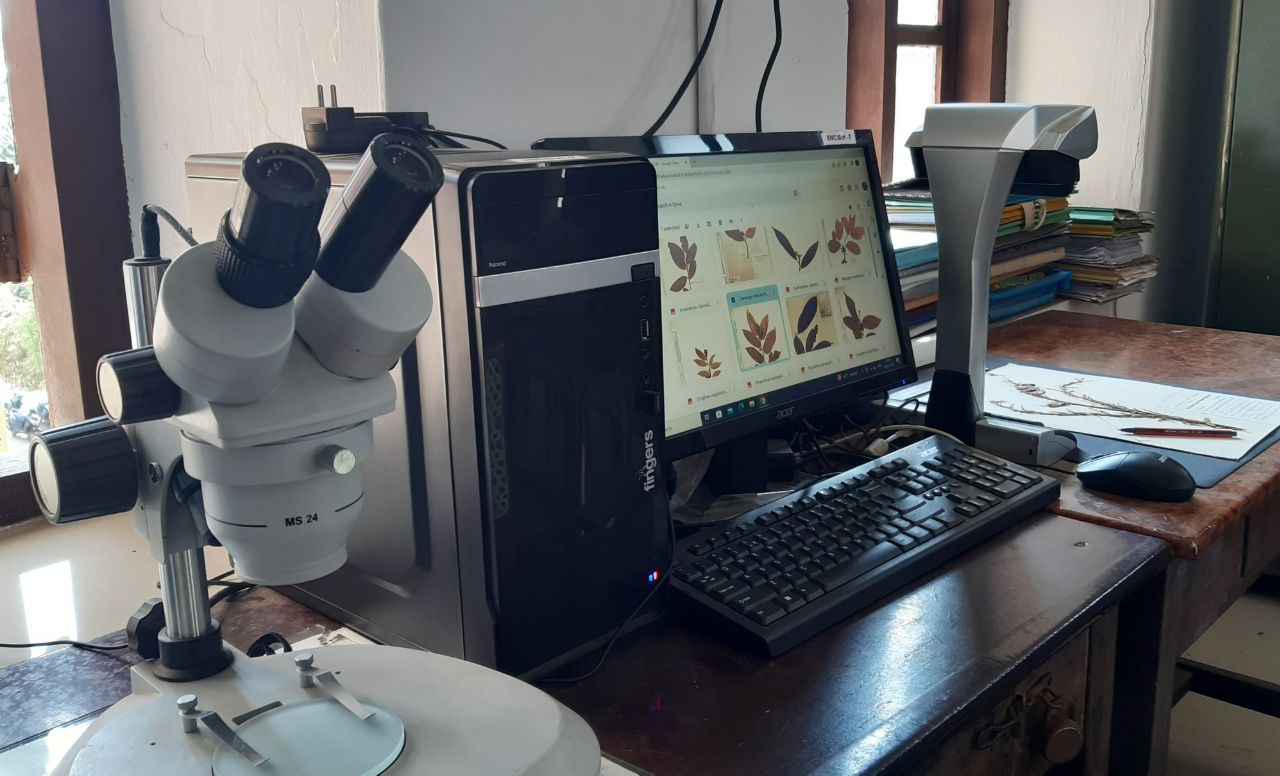
Stereomicroscope and Digital scanner

Stereomicroscope with image project system, ScanNap Digital specimen scanner, subscribed reputed journals from Plant taxonomy, regional maps, checklists and floras, reports on BIS series, and Plant presses.

The herbarium is supported by full time Herbarium Keeper (IST 9.30 a.m.- 3.30 p.m., Monday-Friday). Users may identify collected specimens with faculty guidance on taxonomy, microscopy and appropriate taxonomic identification keys.

== Herbarium curators ==
- 2016 – present : Dr Kiranraj M S

== Herbarium keepers ==
- 2016 – 2025: J Rajendra Prasad
- 2025 – 2026: . Krishnaraj R

== See also ==
- List of herbaria
