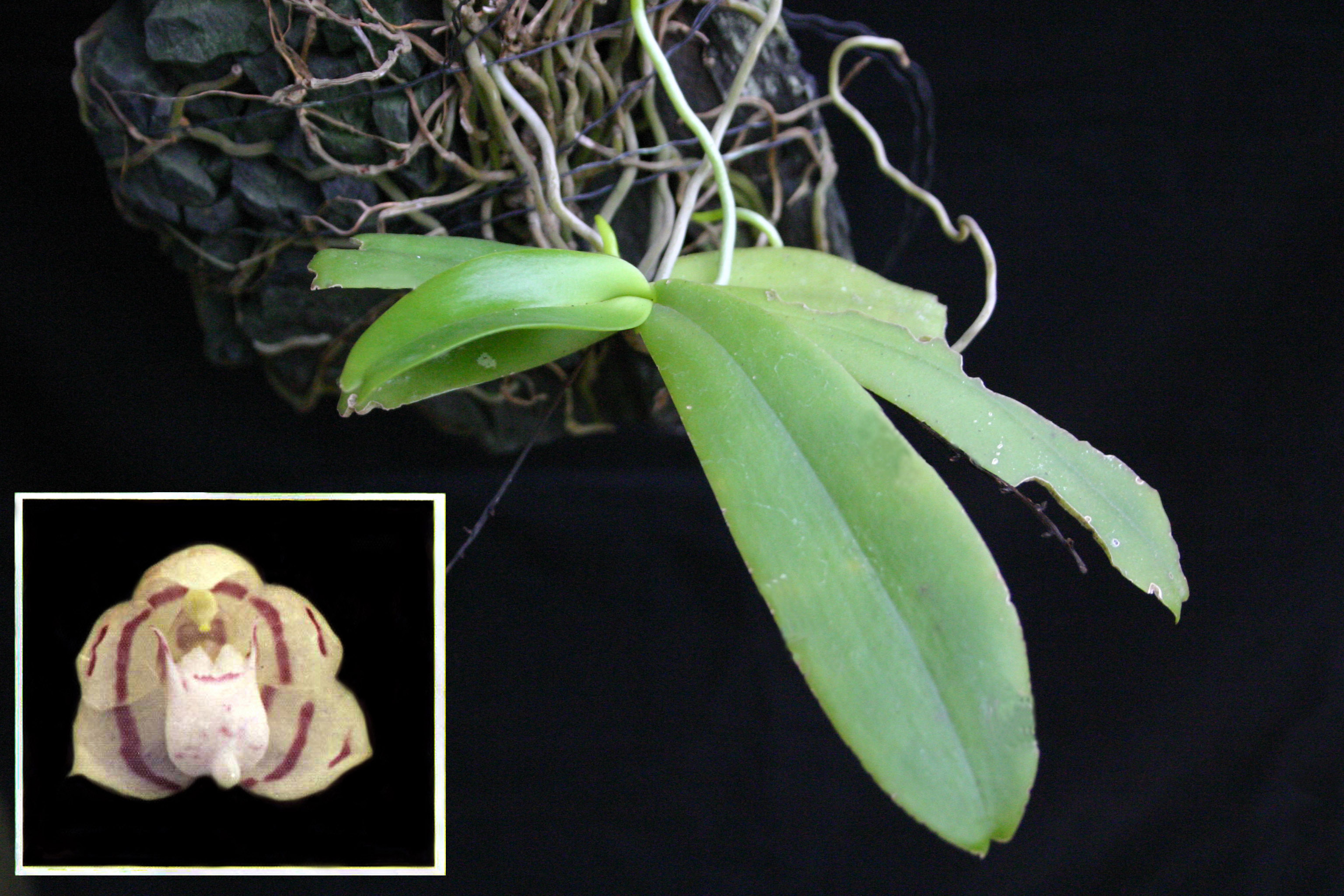
- Pteroceras muriculatum

Scientific classification
- Kingdom: Plantae
- Clade: Tracheophytes
- Clade: Angiosperms
- Clade: Monocots
- Order: Asparagales
- Family: Orchidaceae
- Subfamily: Epidendroideae
- Tribe: Vandeae
- Subtribe: Aeridinae
- Genus: Pteroceras; Hasselt ex Hassk.

Synonyms
- Ornitharium Lindl. & Paxton; Proteroceras J.Joseph & Vajr.

= Pteroceras =

Genus of orchids

Pteroceras is a genus of flowering plants from the orchid family, Orchidaceae. It is native to China, the Indian subcontinent, and Southeast Asia.

== Accepted Species ==
Species accepted as of May 2022:

- Pteroceras asperatum (Schltr.) P.F.Hunt - Yunnan
- Pteroceras biserratum (Ridl.) Holttum - Borneo, Malaysia, Sumatra
- Pteroceras compressum (Blume) Holttum - Malaysia, Sumatra, Java, Thailand
- Pteroceras dalaputtuwa Priyadarshana et al. - Sri Lanka
- Pteroceras erosulum H.A.Pedersen - Sabah
- Pteroceras fragrans (Ridl.) Garay - Borneo
- Pteroceras fraternum (J.J.Sm.) Bakh.f. - Sumatra, Java
- Pteroceras hirsutum (Hook.f.) Holttum - Borneo, Malaysia, Sumatra
- Pteroceras indicum Punekar - Karnataka
- Pteroceras johorense (Holttum) Holttum - Johor
- Pteroceras leopardinum (C.S.P.Parish & Rchb.f.) Seidenf. & Smitinand - Yunnan, India, Indochina, Borneo, Philippines, Sumatra
- Pteroceras longicalcareum (Ames & Rolfe) Garay - Philippines
- Pteroceras monsooniae Sasidh. & Sujanapal - Kerala
- Pteroceras muluense Schuit. & de Vogel - Sabah, Sarawak
- Pteroceras muriculatum (Rchb.f.) P.F.Hunt - Andaman Islands
- Pteroceras nabawanense J.J.Wood & A.L.Lamb - Sabah
- Pteroceras philippinense (Ames) Garay - Philippines
- Pteroceras spathibrachiatum (J.J.Sm.) Garay - Sabah
- Pteroceras teres (Blume) Holttum - Assam, Nepal, Bhutan, India, Bangladesh, Indochina, Malaysia, Indonesia, Philippines
- Pteroceras violaceum (Ridl.) Holttum - Pahang
- Pteroceras viridiflorum (Thwaites) Holttum - India, Sri Lanka
- Pteroceras vriesii (Ridl.) Garay - Borneo

=== Formerly included species ===
Many recently excluded species have been transferred to the genus Brachypeza. One recent transfer has been made to the genus Grosourdya.

- Pteroceras cladostachyum (Hook.f.) H.A.Pedersen of Borneo, Malaysia, Java, Sulawesi and the Philippines is now a synonym of Brachypeza cladostachya (Hook.f.) Kocyan & Schuit.
- Pteroceras decipiens (J.J.Sm.) Bakh.f. of Java and Bali is now a synonym of Grosourdya decipiens (J.J.Sm.) Kocyan & Schuit.
- Pteroceras pallidum (Blume) Holttum of Thailand, Vietnam, Malaysia, Indonesia and the Philippines is now a synonym of Brachypeza pallida (Blume) Kocyan & Schuit.
- Pteroceras semiteretifolium H.A.Pedersen of Vietnam is now a synonym of Brachypeza semiteretifolia (H.A.Pedersen) Kocyan & Schuit.
- Pteroceras simondianum (Gagnep.) Aver. of Vietnam is now a synonym of Brachypeza simondiana (Gagnep.) Kocyan & Schuit.
- Pteroceras unguiculatum (Lindl.) H.A.Pedersen of the Andaman & Nicobar Islands, Malaysia, Indonesia and the Philippines is now a synonym of Brachypeza unguiculata (Lindl.) Kocyan & Schuit.

== See also ==
- List of Orchidaceae genera
