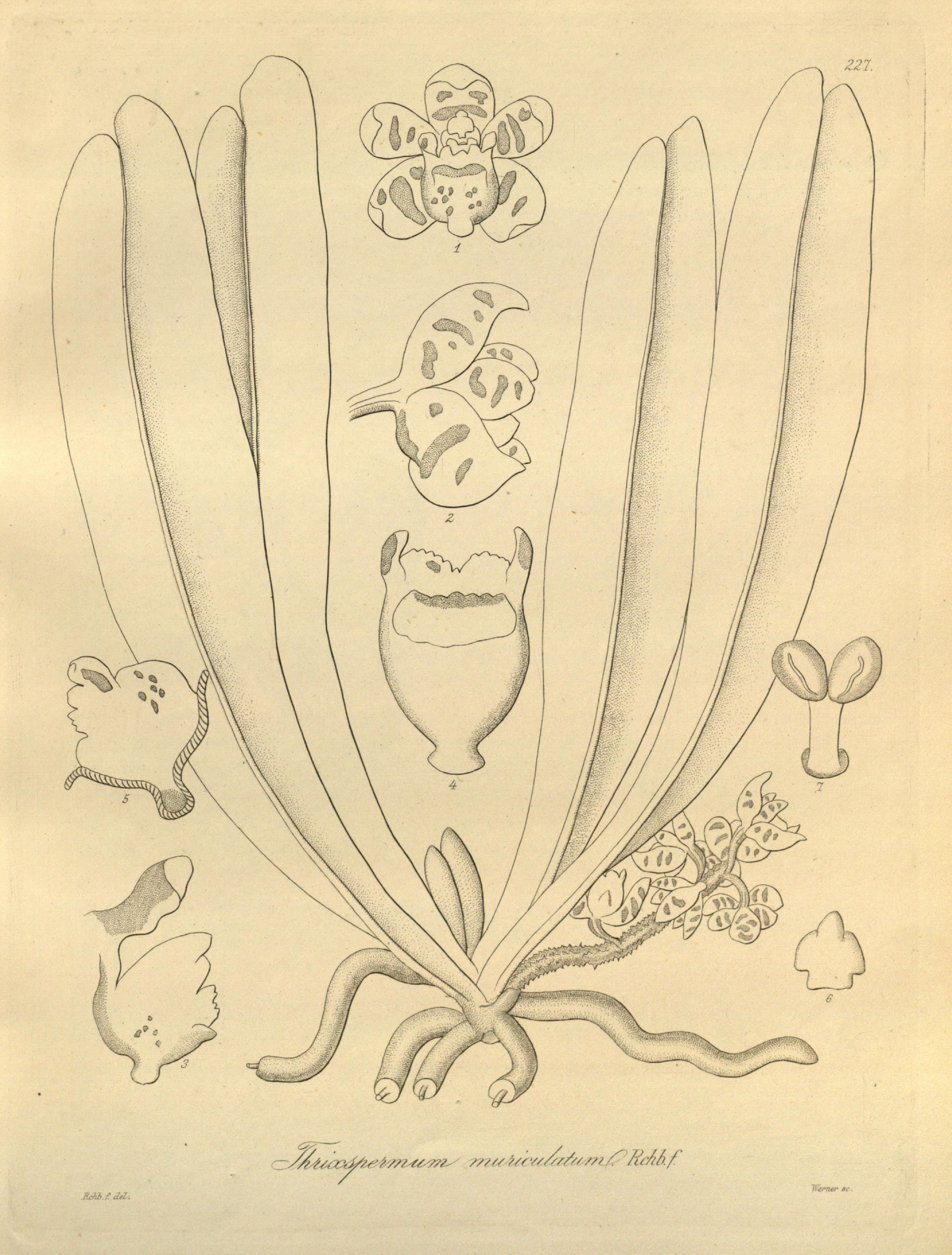
- Illustration of Pteroceras muriculatum as Thrixspermum muriculatum
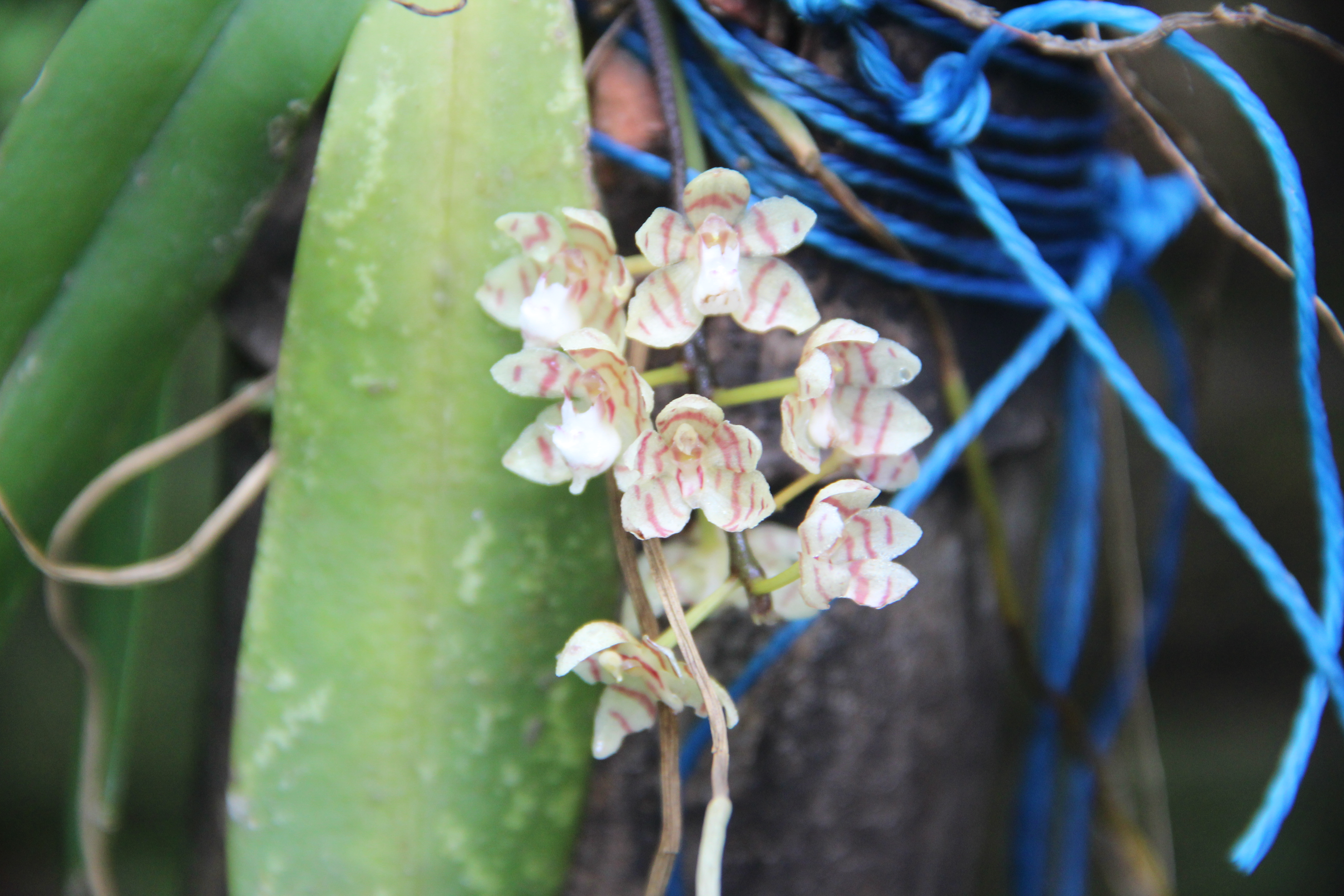
- Flowering specimen

Scientific classification
- Kingdom: Plantae
- Clade: Tracheophytes
- Clade: Angiosperms
- Clade: Monocots
- Order: Asparagales
- Family: Orchidaceae
- Subfamily: Epidendroideae
- Genus: Pteroceras
- Species: P. muriculatum

Binomial name
- Pteroceras muriculatum (Rchb. f.) P. F. Hunt
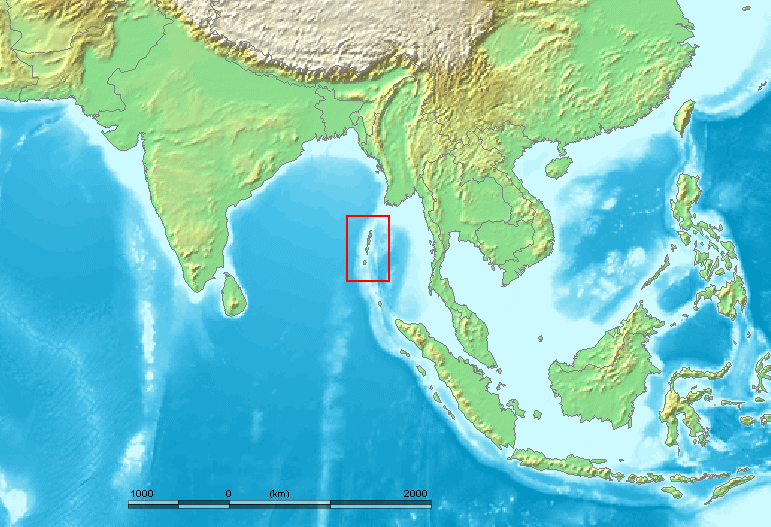
- native distribution of Pteroceras muriculatum

Synonyms
- Sarcochilus muriculatus Rchb.f.; Thrixspermum muriculatum (Rchb.f.) Rchb.f.; Grosourdya muriculata (Rchb.f.) R.Rice

= Pteroceras muriculatum =

Species of orchid

Pteroceras muriculatum is an endemic endangered orchid reported from the Andaman Islands in the Bay of Bengal. This insular orchid was first described by Reichenbach in 1881 as Thrixspermum muriculatum Rchb. f. based on a few specimens procured during the latter part of 19th century by Mr W. Bull. This taxon has not been reported until 2005 after the type collection. During the floristic survey of South Andaman Islands carried out by Sam Mathew for the 'Flora India Project' of the Botanical Survey of India, this taxon was relocated in 1993 from the semievergreen forests at Chidiyatappu region. Pteroceras muriculatum (Reichb. f.) P. F. Hunt is a beautiful small epiphytic orchid having creamy white flowers with distinct transverse purple bands on petals. A living specimen collected from South Andaman Island is conserving at the Field Gene Bank of Jawaharlal Nehru Tropical Botanic Garden and Research Institute, Trivandrum, India.
