= Cai Xitao =

Chinese botanist

Cai Xitao or Tsai Hse-Tao (Chinese: 蔡希陶; pinyin: Cài Xītáo; Wade–Giles: Tsai^{4} Hsi^{1}-tao^{2}; 10 April 1911 – 9 March 1981) was a Chinese botanist from a village near Dongyang, Zhejiang province, China.

In 1928, after studying at various institutions in Hangzhou and Shanghai, though without attaining any formal qualifications, Cai Xitao was able to secure a job at the Jing Sheng Botanic Laboratory in Beijing (北平静生生物调查所) through family connections. In 1932, he was transferred to Yunnan province, where he worked as a botanist in the province's temperate climate. In 1938, he set up the Yunnan Botany Research Institute (云南农林植物研究所) in Heilongtan, and acted as the institute's vice president.

In 1950, Cai Xitao was given charge of the Kunming Institute of Botany, Chinese Academy of Sciences (CAS), and in 1959 the Xishuangbanna Tropical Botanical Garden) was established under his control.

He died on 9 March 1981.

Some of the specimens he collected are now part of the herbaria at Harvard University.
