= National Herbarium, Pakistan =

Herbarium in Islamabad, Pakistan

National Herbarium
- گیاهخانہ قومی
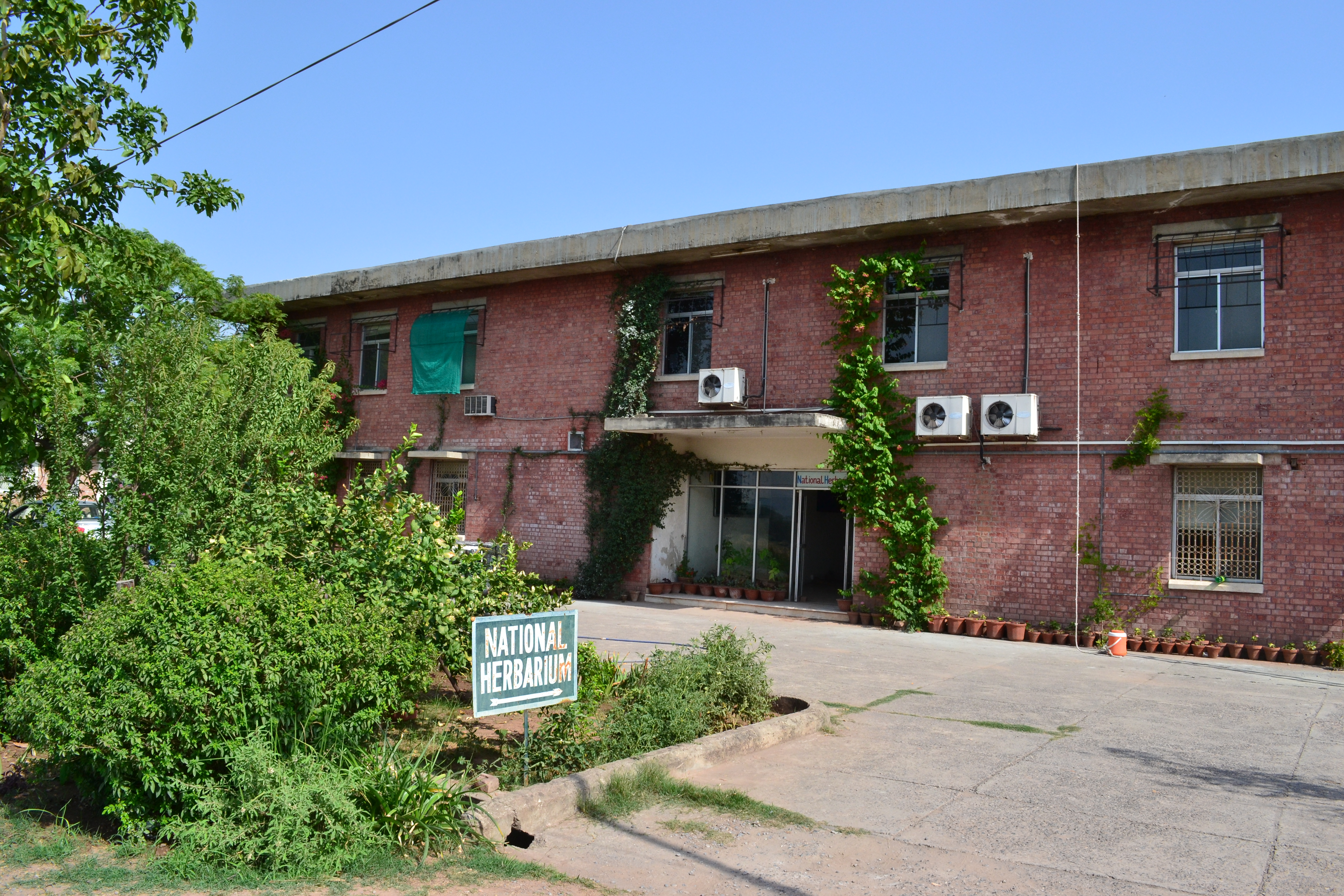
- Type: Herbarium
- Location: Islamabad, Pakistan
- Opened: 1975
- Collections: ~100,000

The National Herbarium is an herbarium, located in Islamabad, Pakistan.

== History and collection ==
The largest herbarium in Pakistan, it was established in 1975 with Dr. Ralph Randles Stewart's collection as its initial beginning. It has a collection of over 100,000 plants. The plants in the herbarium are divided into magnoliophytes (dicotyledons and monocotyledons), gymnosperms, and pteridophytes (or ferns) and they are placed according to families, genera; and species arranged in alphabetical order.

== See also ==
- List of botanical gardens in Pakistan
- List of herbaria

- Pakistani biodiversity
