= Climate Change Ecology (journal) =

- Discipline: Climate change
- Language: English
- Edited by: Alice Catherine Hughes

Publication details
- History: Established 2021
- Publisher: Elsevier

Standard abbreviations
- ISO 4: Clim. Change Ecol.

Indexing
- ISSN: 2666-9005

Climate Change Ecology is an online journal published by Elsevier since 2021. It is indexed in the Directory of Open Access Journals. Its editor-in-chief is Alice Catherine Hughes.
