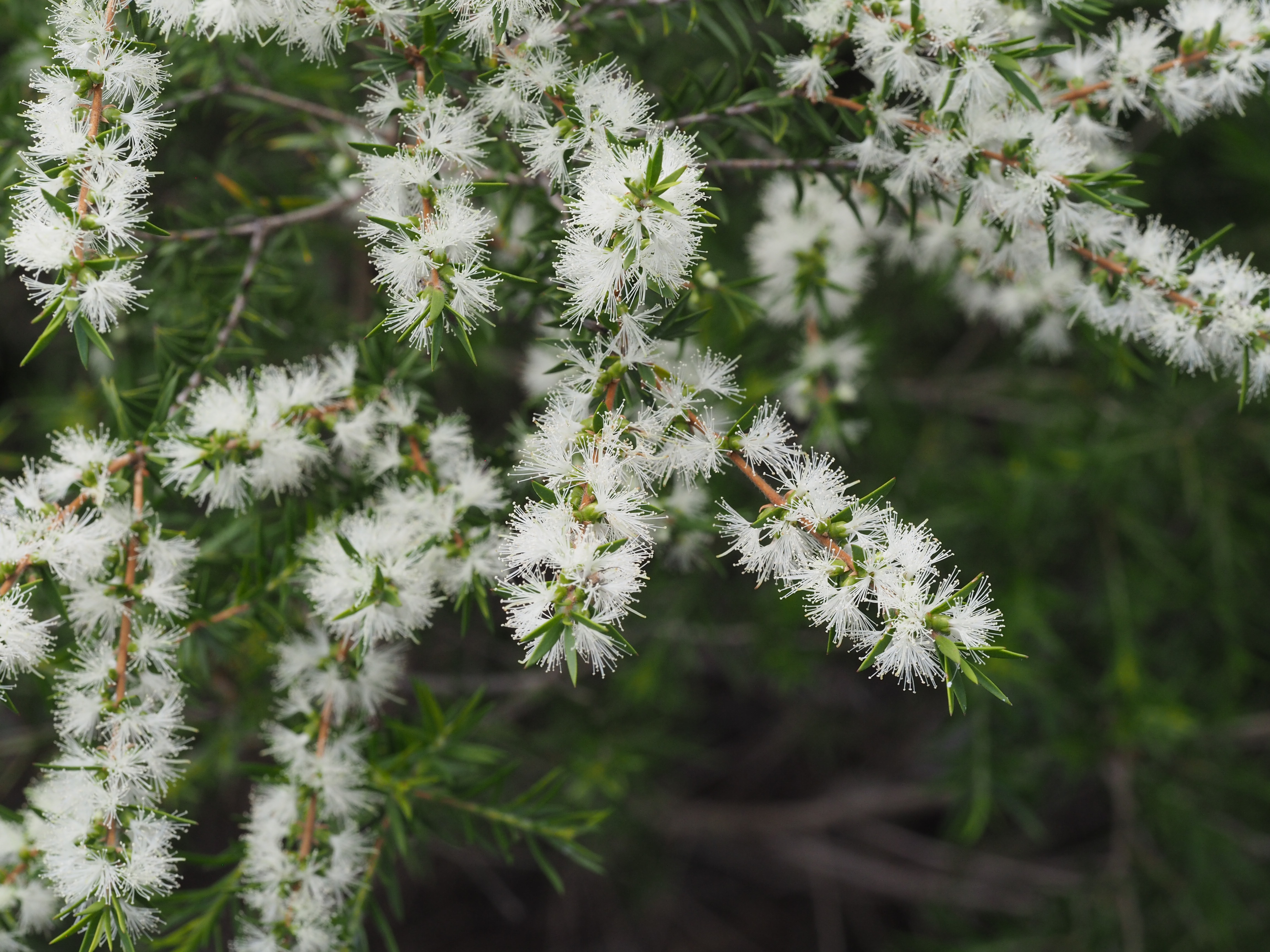

Conservation status
- Data Deficient (IUCN 3.1)

Scientific classification
- Kingdom: Plantae
- Clade: Tracheophytes
- Clade: Angiosperms
- Clade: Eudicots
- Clade: Rosids
- Order: Myrtales
- Family: Myrtaceae
- Genus: Melaleuca
- Species: M. bracteata

Binomial name
- Melaleuca bracteata F.Muell.
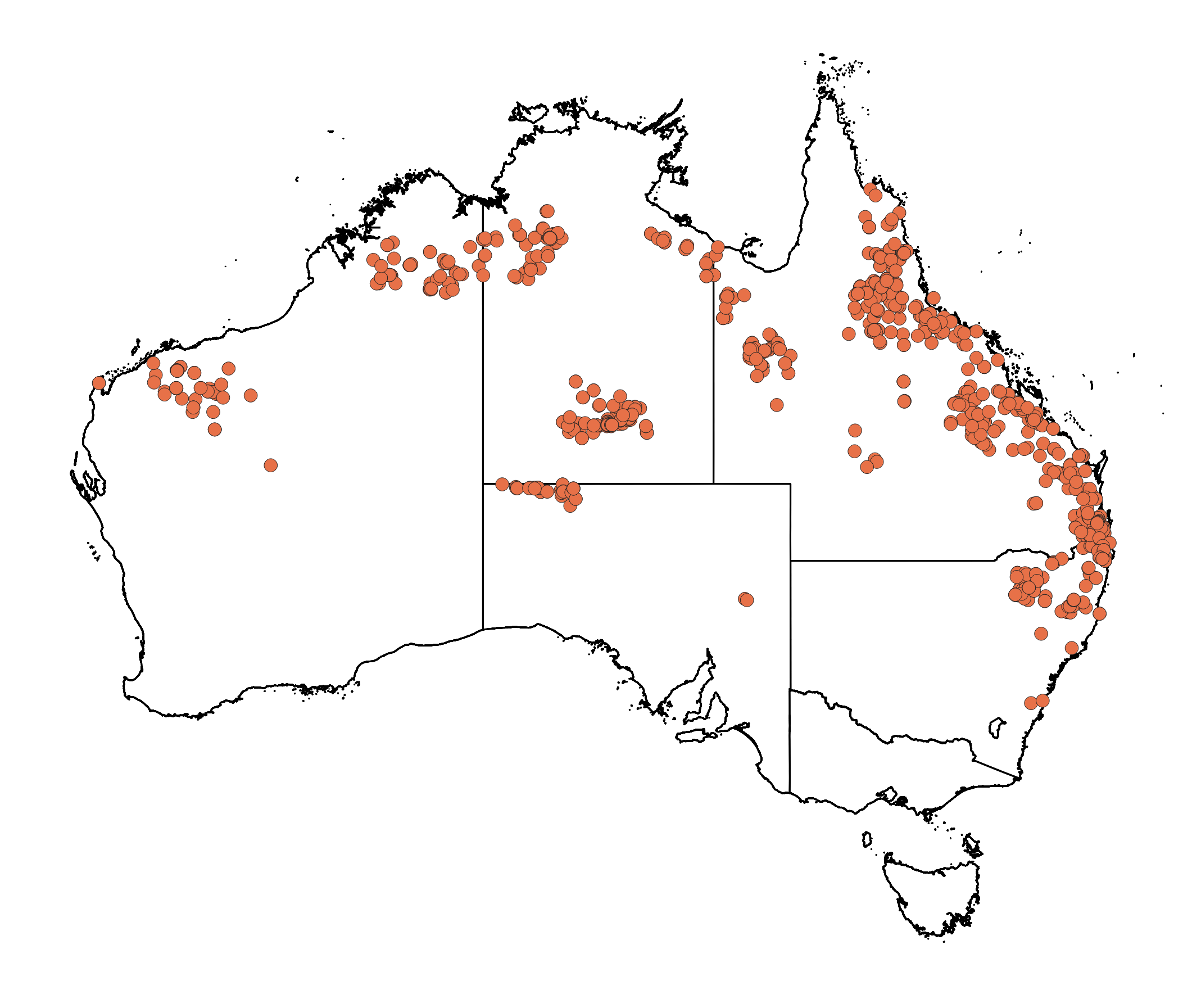
- Occurrence data from AVH; 14 March 2020

= Melaleuca bracteata =

Black tea-tree

Species of tree

Melaleuca bracteata, commonly known as the black tea-tree, river tea-tree or mock olive is a plant in the myrtle family, Myrtaceae and is endemic to northern Australia. It usually occurs as a large shrub but under ideal conditions can grow into a tree up to 10 m (30 ft) tall. It is an adaptable species in cultivation and a number of cultivars have been developed.

== Description ==
Melaleuca bracteata is a bushy-foliaged, small to medium tree, normally 5–8 m (20–30 ft) tall but occasionally taller and it usually flowers and sets seed by the time it is 5–8 m (20–30 ft) tall. Its bark is rough and dark grey in colour. The leaves are narrow, lance-shaped to linear, 8–28 mm (0.3–1 in) long by 1–3 mm (0.04–0.1 in) wide with no stalk, or a very short stalk. The leaves are spirally arranged around the stem and crowded together. The upper surface of the leaf is hairy, especially when young, with many oil-dots.

The black tea-tree flowers profusely. Flowers are loosely arranged in clusters to form cylindrical or ovoid spikes, 30–90 mm (1–4 in) long by about 15 mm (0.6 in) across, coloured cream or white. Each flower usually has a leaf at its base and the petals are shed soon after the flower opens. Flowering occurs from spring to early summer and is followed by fruit which are more or less spherical to oval or barrel-shaped, about 3 mm (0.1 in) in diameter, sparsely arranged along the branches.

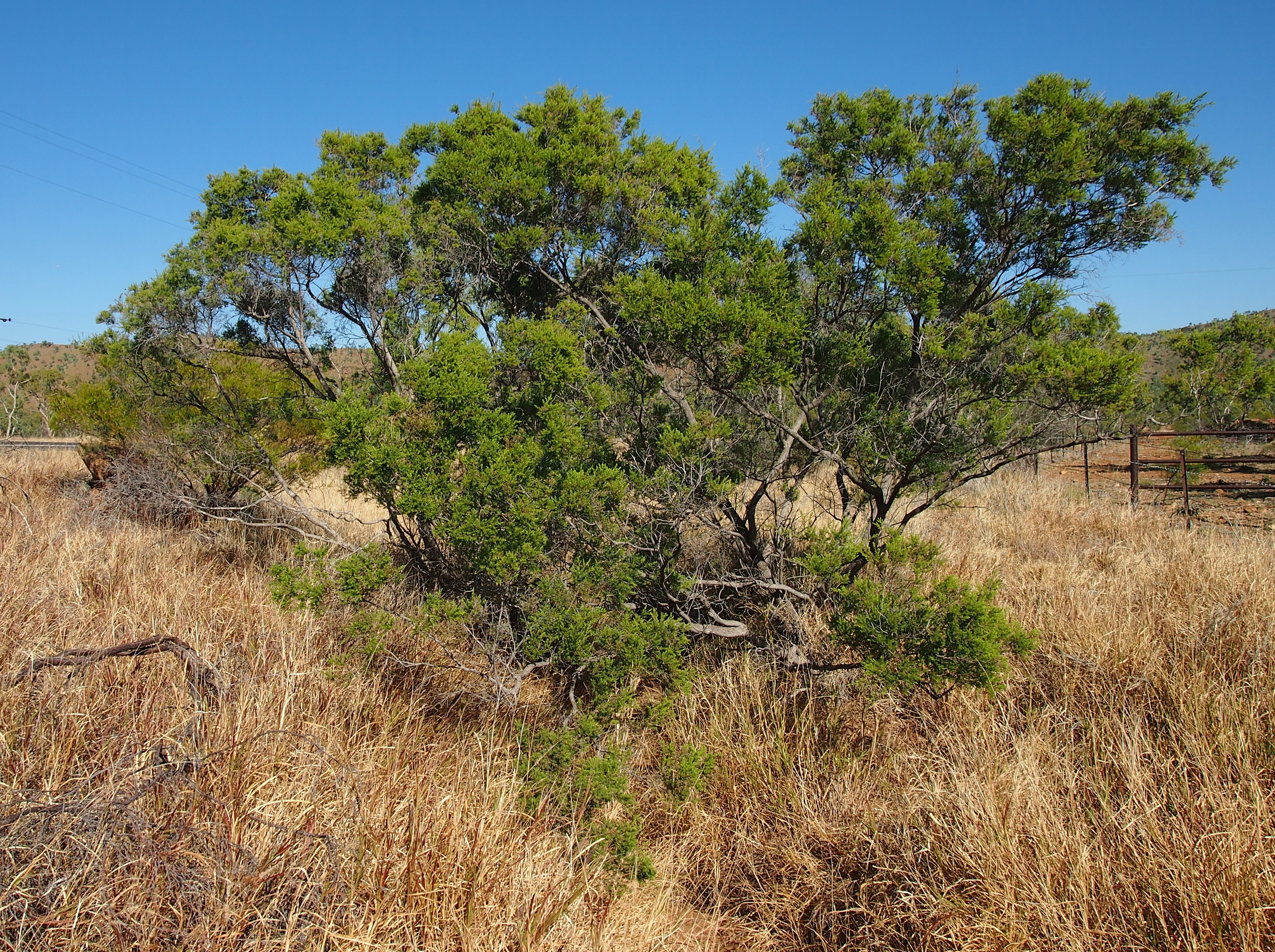
Habit near Mount Isa

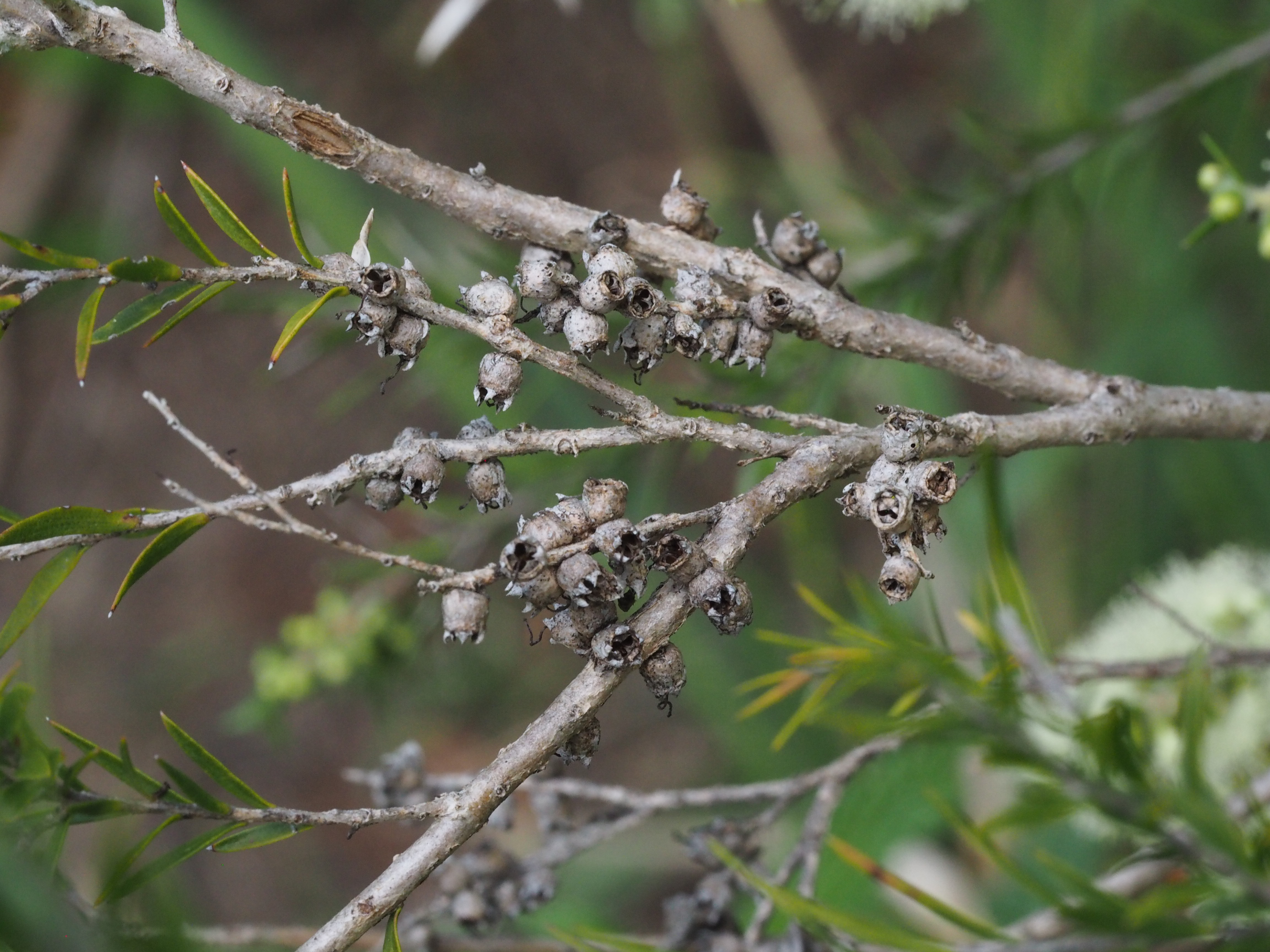
Fruit

== Taxonomy and naming ==
Melaleuca bracteata was first described in 1858 by Ferdinand von Mueller in Fragmenta phytographiae Australiae from a specimen collected near Moreton Bay in Queensland. The specific epithet (bracteata) is derived from the Latin word bractea, meaning "bract".

== Distribution and habitat ==
Black tea-tree occurs in Western Australia, the Northern Territory, and from north-east Queensland southwards to the Macleay River in New South Wales. It grows near the coast and inland, along stream banks and in wet sites. In New South Wales it has been recorded on the Northern Tablelands, North Coast and North West Slopes biogeographic regions. In Western Australia it occurs in the Kimberley and in the Carnarvon and Pilbara biogeographic regions. There are also disjunct populations in South Australia.

== Conservation status ==
This species is classified as not threatened in Western Australia by the Government of Western Australia Department of Parks and Wildlife.

== Uses ==
=== Horticulture ===
M. bracteata is a useful tree in cultivation because it will grow almost anywhere and because of its compact shape and many flowers. Garden cultivars that have been developed include "Revolution Gold", "Revolution Green" and a dwarf form called "Golden Gem".

=== Indigenous use ===
It has been used in smoking medicine in the Northern Territory and for making numerous household items.

=== Essential oils ===
There are four chemotypes of oil based on elemicin or eugenol that are present in the plant. Methyl eugenol in the leaves can be used in insecticides, perfumes and soap.

== Gallery ==
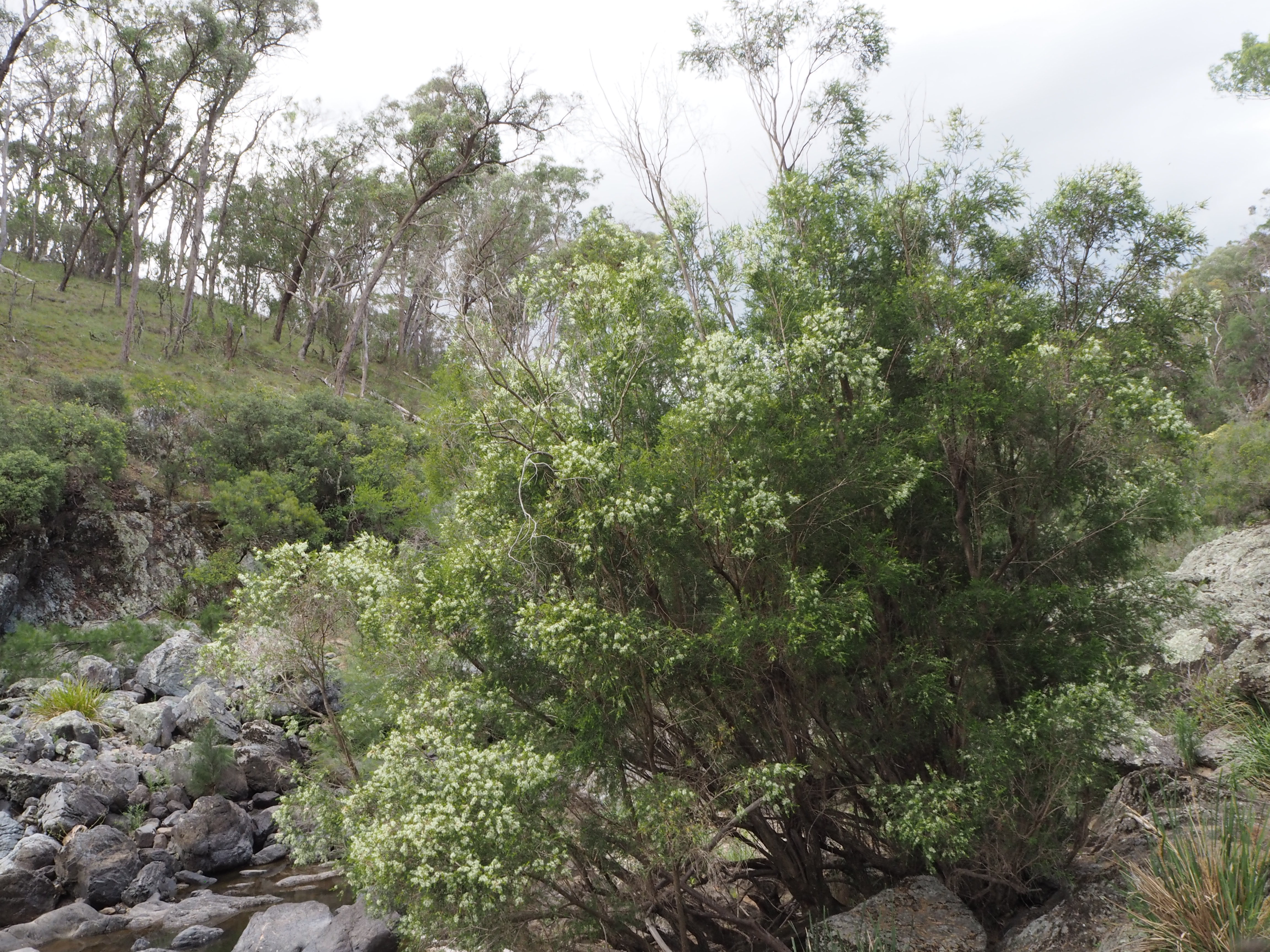
Habit at the extreme southern end of the distribution

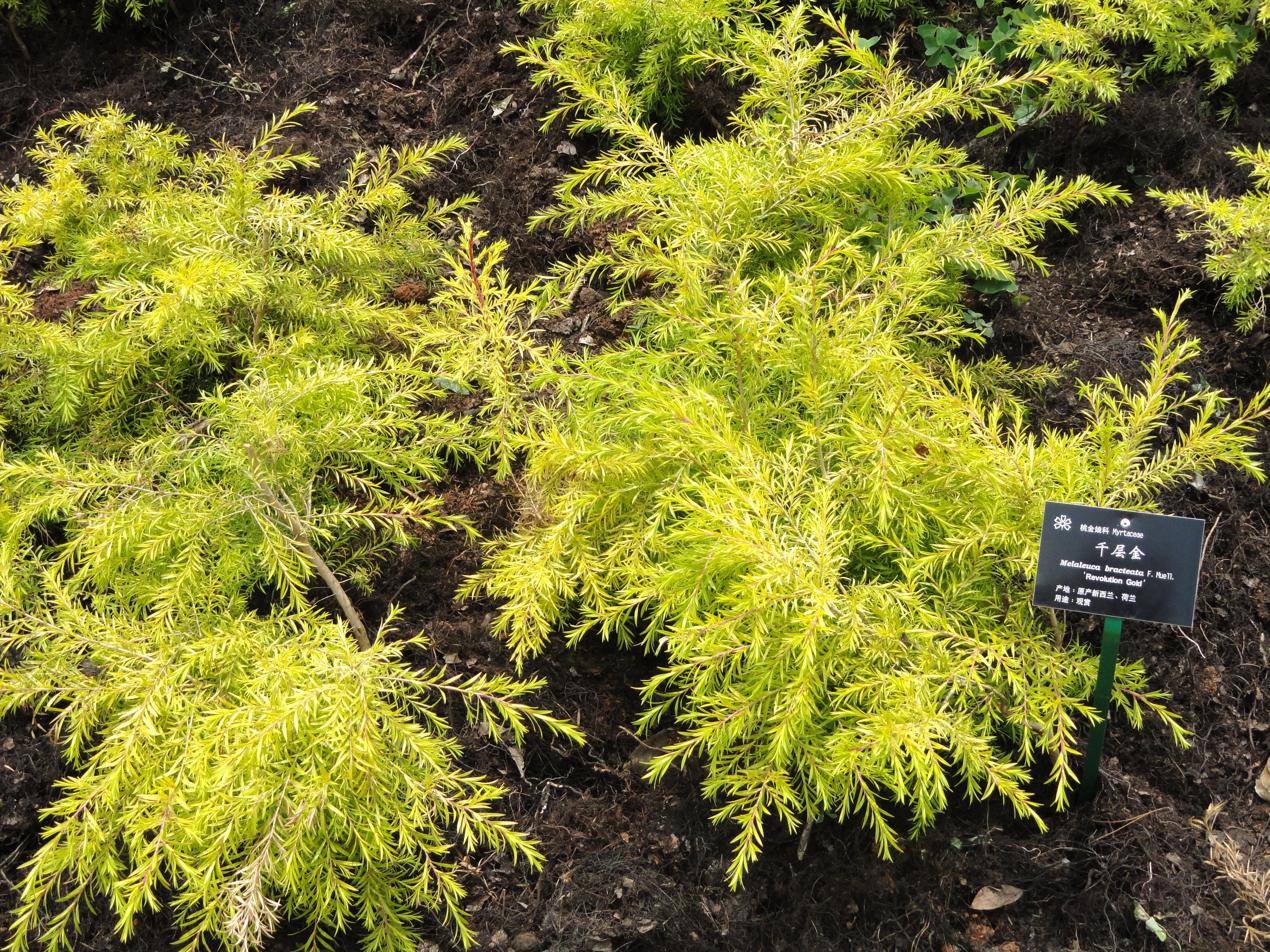
Cultivar "Revolution Gold" in Kunming Botanical Garden

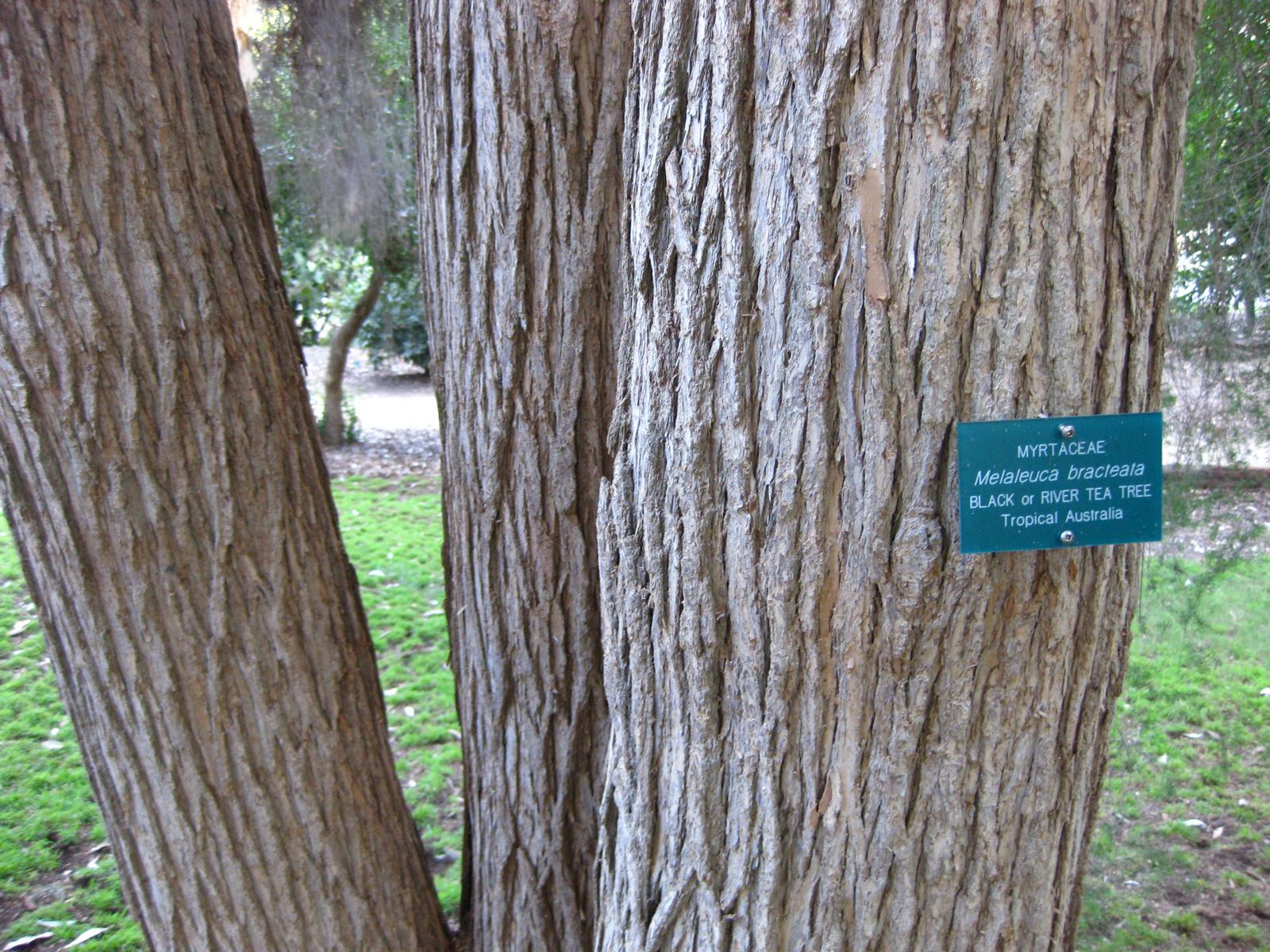
Trunk of M. bractata growing in California.

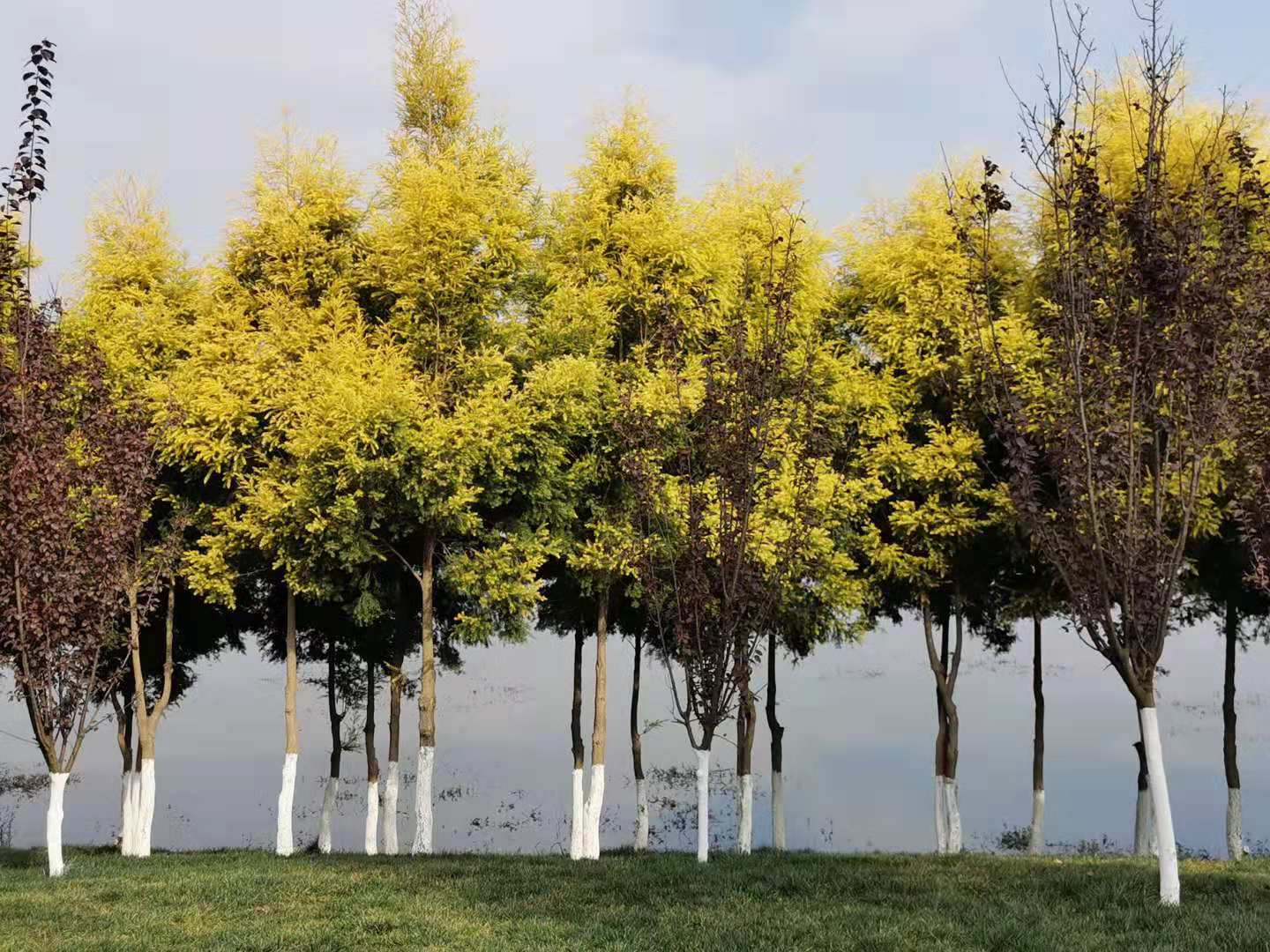
Cultivar in "Dongfang Yun", Mile City, Yunnan, China.
