= United States National Herbarium =

National herbarium (Washington, D.C)

The United States National Herbarium is a collection of five million preserved plant specimens housed in the Department of Botany at the National Museum of Natural History, which is part of the Smithsonian Institution. It represents about 8% of the plant collection resources of the United States and is one of the ten largest herbaria in the world.

The herbarium was founded in 1848, when the first collections were accessioned from the United States Exploring Expedition, when botanists pressed approximately 50,000 specimens, representing 10,000 species of plants. The Index Herbariorum code assigned to this herbarium is US and this abbreviation is used when citing housed specimens.
