= Kunming Institute of Botany =

Research institution in Kunming, China

Kunming Botanical Garden
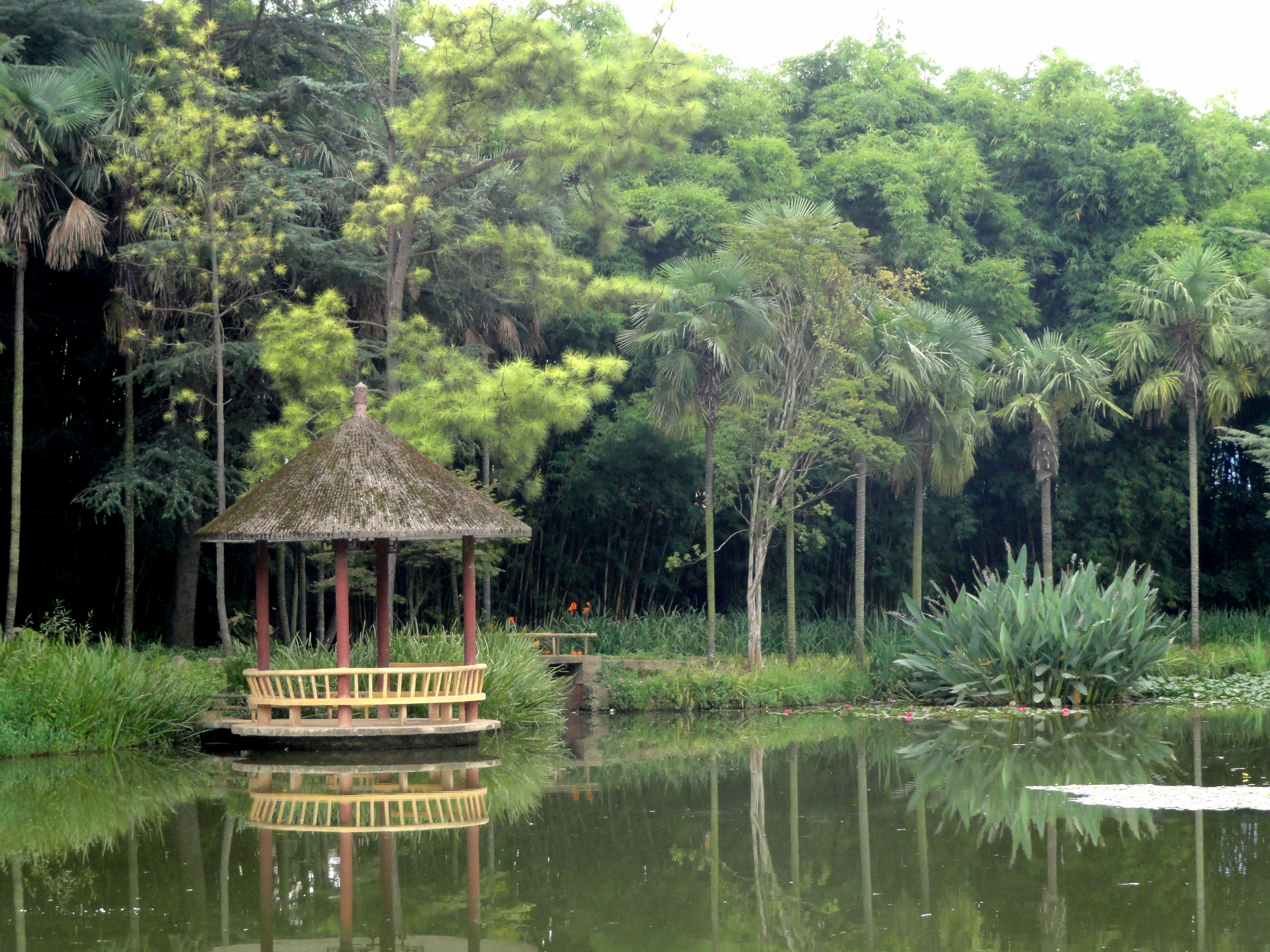
- Interactive map of Kunming Botanical Garden
- Type: Botanical garden
- Location: Kunming, China
- Coordinates: 25°08′24″N 102°44′20″E
- Operator: Chinese Academy of Sciences
- Website: http://english.kib.cas.cn/

Kunming Institute of Botany, or KIB (Chinese: 昆明植物研究所; pinyin: Kūnmíng Zhíwù Yánjiūsuǒ), founded in 1938, is a research institution in the field of Botany, which is located in Kunming, the capital of Yunnan Province, China.

The Institute is one of the major herbariums in China and maintains a collection of over one million plant specimens. There are also over 200,000 specimens of fungi, lichens, and mosses, many of which were donated by mycologist Mu Zang.

The Institute also has a botanical garden. Currently there are around 5,000 species of vascular plants in the botanical garden. There are several sections, with specific collections, such as:

- Arboretum
- Collection of herbs.
- Endangered species and rare species.
- Aquatic species.
- Gardens of specimens of the genus Camellia, Magnolia, and Begonia.
- Ferns

All the plants that are hosted in the botanical garden are a foundation on which to work, for the research and experience of the staff of scientists at the Institute. Studies are conducted to improve the cultivation of plants of economic interest, with a view to better use, both nutritionally and industrially. Currently a digital database of the botanical garden is being prepared, as well as of wild plants in the province of Yunnan.

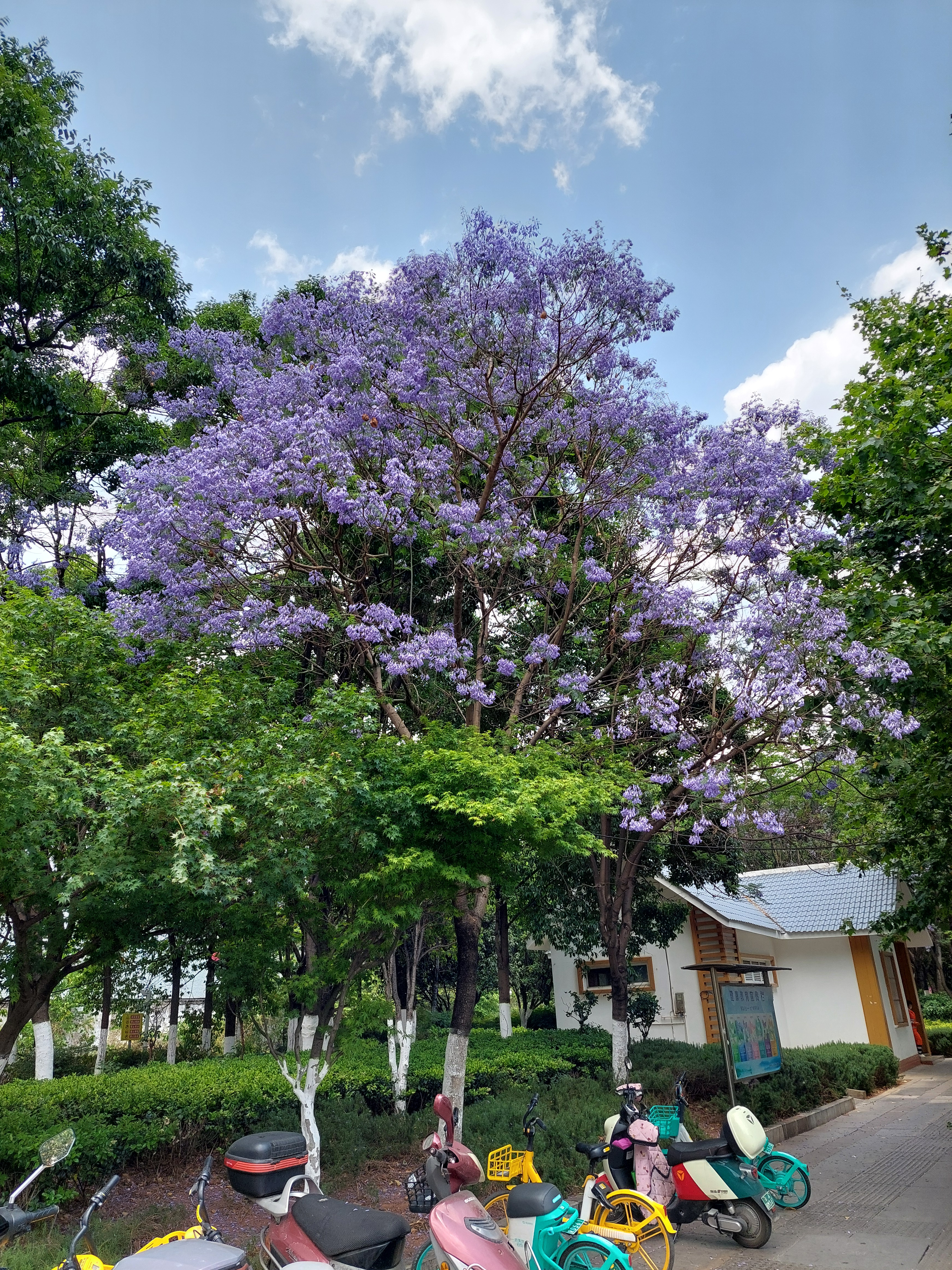
Jacaranda tree in Kunming, all local trees of this species originate from trees planted in the botanical garden

In 1984, the institute exchanged seeds with Algeria, among the seeds received were Jacaranda. These were grown into mature trees in the botanical garden and later used to plant Jacaranda trees along many streets in Kunming.

== Germplasm Bank of Wild Species ==
A comprehensive research and preservation facility for the germplasm of rare and endangered plants, wild animal species and microorganisms was completed in 2007 at the KIB.

With an investment of 148 million yuan (18.5 million U.S. dollars) over two years, the "Southwest China Germplasm Bank of Wild Species" facility was established by the Kunming Institute of Botany (KIB) with the help of the Chinese Academy of Sciences (CAS).

The bank is a key player in China's biotech industry and a pioneer in the nation's biodiversity conservation and bioresource development strategy.

According to the KIB, the bank sees itself as a leading storage facility of Asian species within 15 years of its foundation, and expects to make significant contributions to the development of the biotech industry and life science research by providing valuable resources, information and expertise.

Within the next five years, the bank is expected to collect 6,450 wild species, 4,000 of which will be plant seed species. Within 15 years, its collection will reach 19,000 species.

The bank comprises a seed section, an in-vitro micro-propagation unit, a microorganism bank, an animal germplasm bank, a DNA bank, an information center and a garden.

Stretching across an undulating landscape and climatic zones ranging from the tropical to the frigid, Yunnan is home to a multitude of plant species linked together by a complex network of phylogenetic relations, and accounts for more than 50 percent of China's plant diversity.

It claims to be Asia's largest seed bank.

== See also ==
- Wu Zheng-yi, director of KIB
- Cai Xitao, botanist
- Kunming Institute of Zoology
- Xishuangbanna Tropical Botanic Gardens
- List of herbaria
