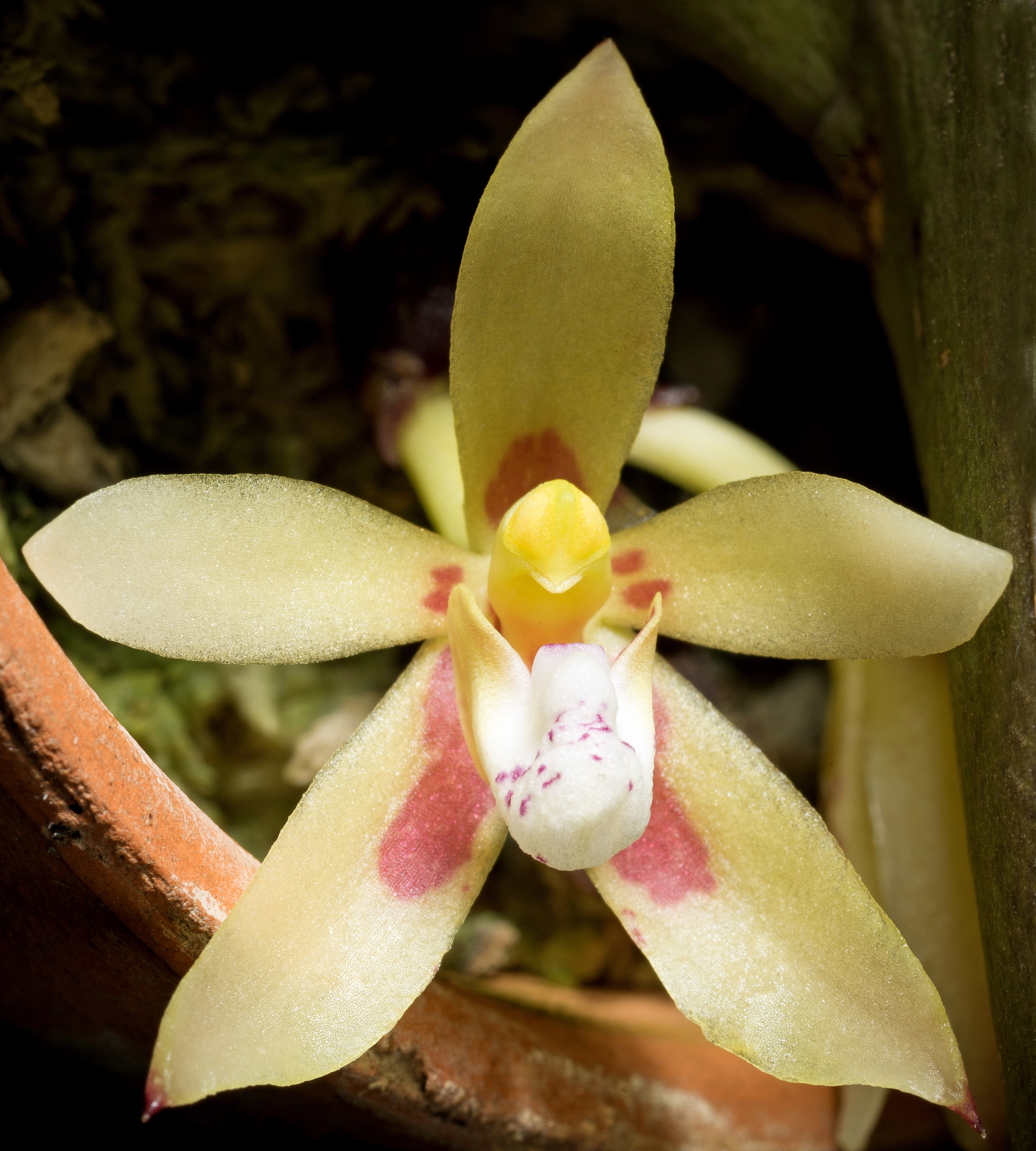
- Brachypeza cladostachya

Scientific classification
- Kingdom: Plantae
- Clade: Tracheophytes
- Clade: Angiosperms
- Clade: Monocots
- Order: Asparagales
- Family: Orchidaceae
- Subfamily: Epidendroideae
- Tribe: Vandeae
- Subtribe: Aeridinae
- Genus: Brachypeza; Garay

Type species
- Brachypeza archytas (Ridl.) Garay

= Brachypeza =

Genus of orchids

Brachypeza, commonly known as sage orchids, is a genus of flowering plants from the orchid family, Orchidaceae. Orchids in this genus have short stems with fleshy leaves and arching flowering stems with short-lived flowers. The sepals and petals are similar in size and shape and the labellum is pouch-like and suspended at the base of the flower. Sage orchids occur in tropical areas from Indochina to New Guinea.

== Taxonomy and naming ==
The genus Brachypeza was first formally described in 1972 by Leslie Andrew Garay and the description was published in the Botanical Museum Leaflets of Harvard University.

=== Species list ===
The following is a list of Brachypeza species accepted by Plants of the World Online as at October 2025:

- Bachypeza archytas (Ridl.) Garay - Christmas Island
- Brachypeza cladostachya (Hook.f.) Kocyan & Schuit.
- Brachypeza indusiata (Rchb.f.) Garay - Borneo, Malaysia, Maluku, Sulawesi, Sumatra, New Guinea
- Brachypeza koeteiensis (Schltr.) Garay - Borneo
- Brachypeza laotica (Seidenf.) Seidenf. - Laos, Thailand and possibly Vietnam
- Brachypeza minimipes (J.J.Sm.) Garay - Sumatra
- Brachypeza pallida (Blume) Kocyan & Schuit.
- Brachypeza simondiana (Gagnep.) Kocyan & Schuit.
- Brachypeza stenoglottis (Hook.f.) Garay - Borneo, Malaysia, Maluku, Sulawesi, Sumatra, New Guinea
- Brachypeza unguiculata (Lindl.) Kocyan & Schuit.
- Brachypeza uniflora (Tixier ex Seidenf.) Ormerod - Vietnam
- Brachypeza zamboangensis (Ames) Garay - Borneo, Philippines

== See also ==
- List of Orchidaceae genera
