= Xishuangbanna Tropical Botanical Garden =

Botanical garden in Yunnan, China

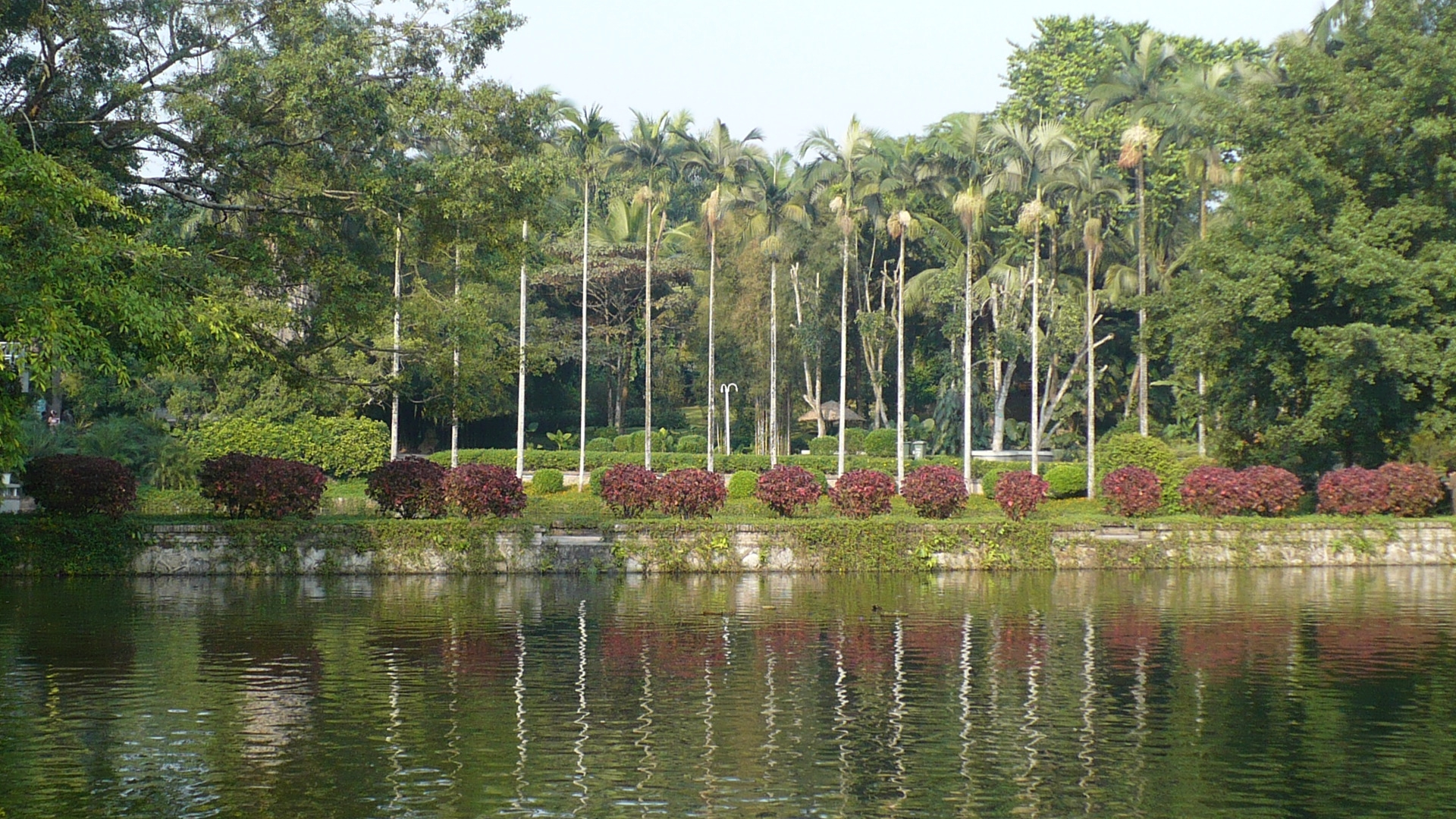
- Interactive map of Xishuangbanna Tropical Botanical Garden
- Location: Xishuangbanna, China
- Coordinates: 21°55′N 101°15′E
- Opened: 1959
- Operator: Chinese Academy of Sciences

Xishuangbanna Tropical Botanical Garden
- Traditional Chinese: 中國科學院西雙版納熱帶植物園
- Simplified Chinese: 中国科学院西双版纳热带植物园
- Literal meaning: Chinese Academy of Sciences Xishuangbanna Tropical Botanical Garden
Transcriptions
Standard Mandarin
- Hanyu Pinyin: Zhōngguó Kēxuéyuàn Xīshuāngbǎnnà Rèdài Zhíwùyuán
- IPA: [ʈʂʊ́ŋkwǒ kʰɤ́ɕɥěɥɛ̂n ɕíʂwáŋpànnâ ɻɤ̂tâɪ ʈʂɻ̩̌ûɥɛ̌n]

Xishuangbanna Tropical Botanical Garden (XTBG), of the Chinese Academy of Sciences (CAS), founded in 1959, is located in Mengla County, Xishuangbanna at 21º55' N, 101º15'E, covering an area of 1125 ha. Over 13,000 species of tropical plants are preserved in its 35 living collections, including over 301 families and 2110 genera.

== Organization ==
XTBG is a comprehensive research institution engaged in biodiversity conservation and sustainable uses of plant resources, focusing on forest ecosystem ecology, conservation biology and resource plant development. The institute has three major divisions including two State Key labs (The Keylab for Tropical Forest Ecology (15 research groups), and the Keylab for Tropical Plant resources and Sustainable use (8 groups)), and the Centre for Integrative conservation (9 groups).

It also leads CUBG (the Chinese Union of Botanic gardens: which currently includes 88 Botanic gardens across China) in addition to being an active member of IUBG (the International Union of Botanic Gardens).

Facilities available for scientific research include two national field research stations (Xishuangbanna Tropical Rainforest Ecosystem Station and Ailaoshan Station for Forest Ecosystem Studies), the Yuanjiang Savannna station, and an extension in the Jingdong Subtropical Botanical garden.

Laboratories include Biogeochemistry, Molecular Biology & Biotechnology, Plant Phylogenetics & Conservation Biology, Physiological Ecology; a Germplasm Bank for Rare & Endangered Plants; and a Herbarium and seedbank of Tropical Plants, Landscape ecology, paleobotany, and many others.

Aside from the headquarters in Xishuangbanna, an important division has been set up in Kunming, the capital city of Yunnan Province.

== Staff ==
XTBG has some 338 staff members, including 164 scientific researchers and technical personnel. There are currently 101 senior researchers, 240 postgraduate students (98 of them are doctoral candidates, 142 Masters) and 28 postdoctoral scientists or visiting scientists. XTBG is unusual for a CAS institute in having around 10% of research staff and students from overseas.

== Research ==
XTBG's vision is to be a "Noah's arc for tropical plant conservation", through its ex-situ collections, and to be a leading establishment for tropical biology and conservation research.

Since its establishment, XTBG has accomplished over 698 scientific research projects; 13 important achievements were awarded ministerial or provincial prizes. Since the implementation of Knowledge Innovation Program of the Chinese Academy of Sciences, 17 monographs, 60 books and 829 scientific papers have been published, 91 of them were published on internationally peer-reviewed journals; national patents were awarded to 11 scientific innovations.

== Collaboration ==
International collaborations have been established with botanical gardens, universities, academic research institutions in more than 50 countries and regions and international organizations, and more than 20 agreements on various kinds of cooperative activities have been signed with collaborators. In recent years, XTBG has organized and hosted a series of important international conferences. More than 10 well-known experts and scholars in the world have become XTBG's honorary professors.

== See also ==
- Cai Xitao, botanist
- List of botanical gardens
- China Biosphere Reserve Network
