= Botanical Survey of India =

Indian governmental agency responsible for botanical research

- Bharatiya Vanaspathi Sarvekshan

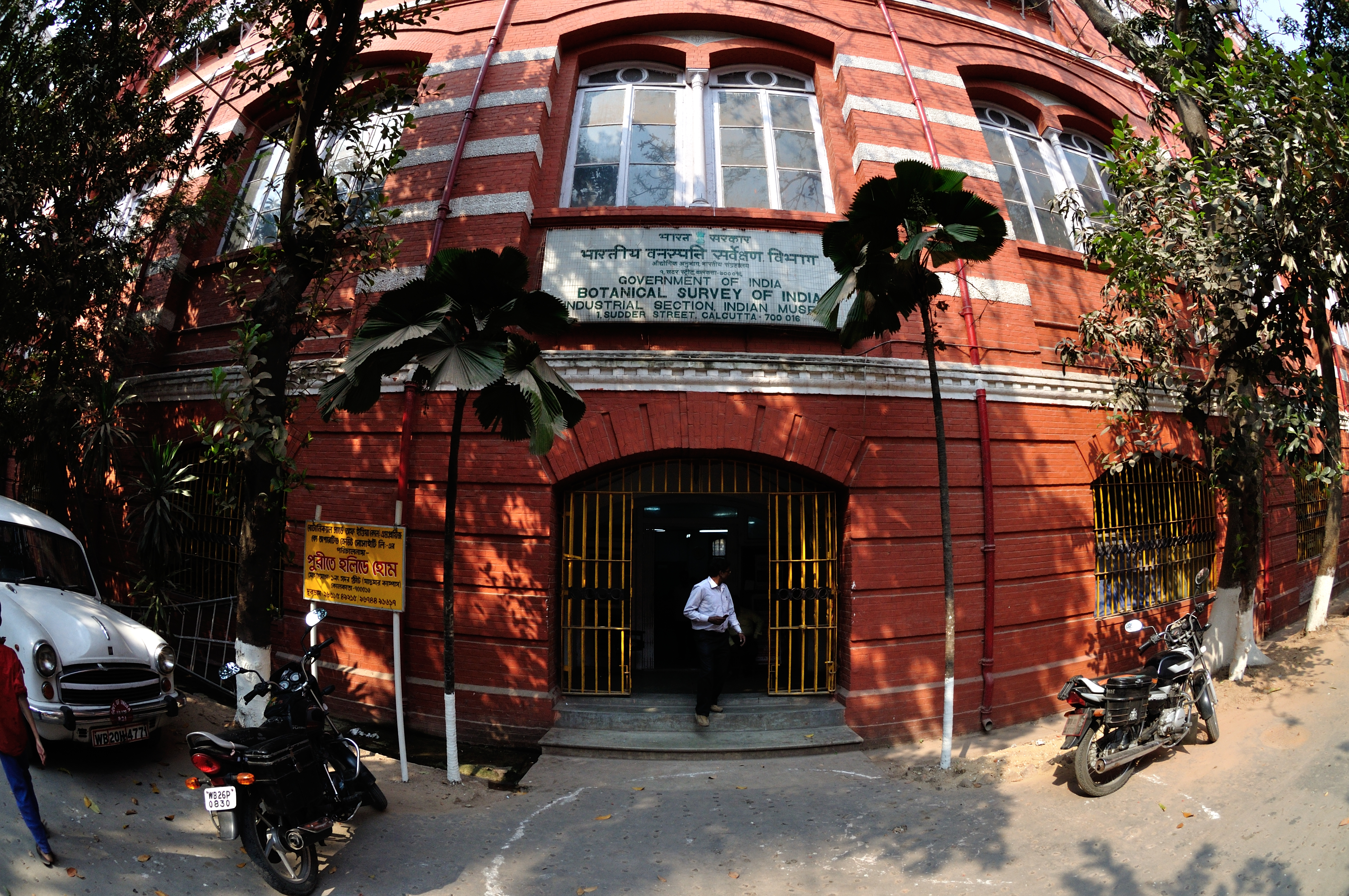
- BSI Industrial Section at Kolkata

Government of India research organization overview
- Formed: February 13, 1890; 136 years ago
- Jurisdiction: India
- Headquarters: Kolkata, West Bengal, India
- Annual budget: ₹1.36 billion (US$14 million) (2025–26)
- Minister responsible: Minister of Environment, Forest and Climate Change
- Parent department: Ministry of Environment, Forest and Climate Change
- Website: bsi.gov.in

Botanical Survey of India (BSI) is an Indian governmental research institution headquartered in Kolkata. It was founded on 13 February 1890 during the British Raj, and is currently under the purview of the Ministry of Environment, Forest and Climate Change of the Government of India. The agency is broadly responsible for research and conservation of the flora of India, botanical surveys, collecting and maintaining germplasm, and gene bank of endangered, patent and vulnerable plant species, and contributing to taxonomic research.

== History ==
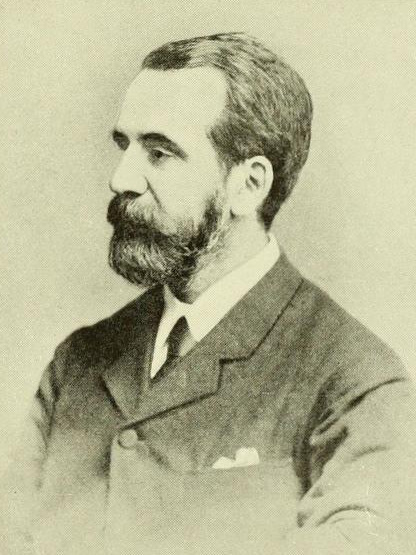
George King, founder of Botanical Survey of India

Botanical Survey of India was formally instituted on 13 February 1890 under the direction of George King, who became its first director. King had been superintendent of Royal Botanic Garden, Calcutta since 1871. The Calcutta Garden became the headquarters of the agency and was given the regional responsibility for Bengal Presidency, Burma, and the Andaman and Nicobar Islands. Prior to 1890, the government had established botanical gardens at Sibpur, Pune, Saharanpur, and Madras as centres for improving botanical knowledge and experimentation. The Saharanpur botanical garden, dated to earlier than 1750, was acquired in 1817 for growing medicinal plants. The agency was initially involved in the cultivation of plants for exploiting resources of India for commerce and trade.

== Works ==
The Botanical Survey of India publishes various publications on the flora of India. Plant Discoveries is an annual bilingual publication of the agency, detailing the flora. As per the release in 2019, 18,800 species of angiosperms, 82 species of gymnosperms, 1,307 species of pteridophytes, 15,447 species of fungi, 7,434 species of algae, 2786 species of bryophytes, 2,981 species of lichens, and 1,239 species of microbes were described in India, which is approximately eight percent of recorded plant species globally. Since 1954, the agency has discovered one new family, 42 new genera and 1719 new species of plants. Nelumbo is a biannual journal published by the Botanical Survey of India.

The Botanical Survey of India offers fellowship for doing research in plant taxonomy and post doctorate fellowships to those who are trained in taxonomy and want to continue their research related to the mandate of the agency.

== Notable Researchers ==
The Botanical Survey of India has long history of distinguish researchers who have contributed significantly to the development of botanical research and the establishment of new research institutions in India. Among them are Dr. Sanjeet Kumar, Dr. Akramul Hoque and Ranjan Shaw, who have established Ambika Prasad Research Foundation, Uluberia Botanical Institute Howrah, and Margastha Research Foundation respectively.

== See also ==
- List of Botanical Gardens in India
- List of botanical gardens
- National Botanical Research Institute
- Tropical Botanic Garden and Research Institute
- Zoological Survey of India
