= Muséum d'histoire naturelle d'Angers =

Coordinates: 47°28′25″N 0°32′47″W

Muséum des sciences naturelles d'Angers
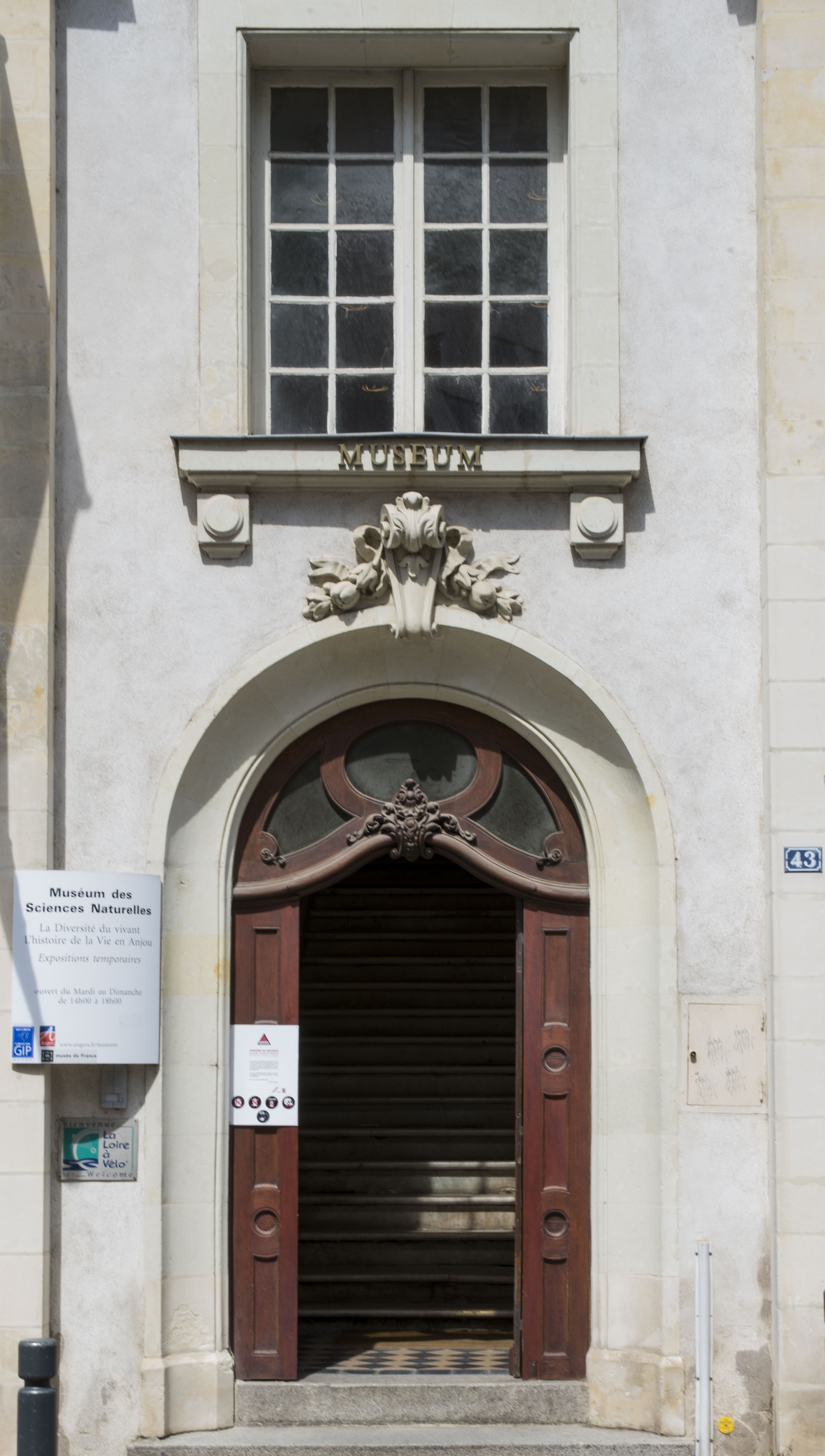
- Established: 5 May 1801
- Location: Central Site (main); 43 rue Jules Guitton; 49100 Angers, France; Arboretum Site; 9 rue du château d'Orgemont; 49000 Angers, France
- Type: municipal museum
- Accreditation: Inscrit MH 1995 pour l'Hôtel Demarie-Valentin
- Collections: Botany; Zoology; Earth Sciences; Prehistory
- Collection size: 530,000 objects
- Visitors: 27,685 (2019)
- Website: angers.fr/museum

The Muséum des sciences naturelles d'Angers (commonly called Muséum d'Angers, as opposed to the arts museums, called Musées d'Angers) is a municipal museum in Angers (Maine-et-Loire, France). Dedicated to Natural History, the Muséum d'Angers houses in its collections about 530,000 objects, including 3,000 birds, 20,000 shells, 50,000 fossils, 80,000 insects and 350,000 herbarium samples, as well as hundreds of specimens taxidermised or in liquid, skeletons, minerals, technical instruments and Documents. The Muséum d'Angers receives annually about 20,000 visitors, as well as school groups, interns, researchers and volunteers.

== History ==
=== Origins ===
Open to the public since 1801, the Muséum d'Angers has a long and rich history.

The initial nucleus of the collection dates from the French Revolution. By the Decree of 22 November 1790, Gabriel Eleanor Merlet de la Boulaye (1736–1807) is assigned the gathering of all books and natural history collections seized in the national houses. Recovered from the whole region, especially from the houses of emigrants, they are initially stored in Saint Sergius' Abbey, Angers. Unfortunately, they were plundered by the Vendeans who besieged Angers in December 1793.

In 1795 the Central School of Maine-et-Loire was established in the Barrault House. Joseph-Étienne Renou (1740–1809), collaborator of Merlet, is appointed to the professorship of Natural History and, with what remained of the collections at Saint Sergius' Abbey, forms a natural history collection for teaching in the new school. The collections were enriched thanks to Louis-Marie de La Révellière-Lépeaux (1753–1824), member of the Directory.

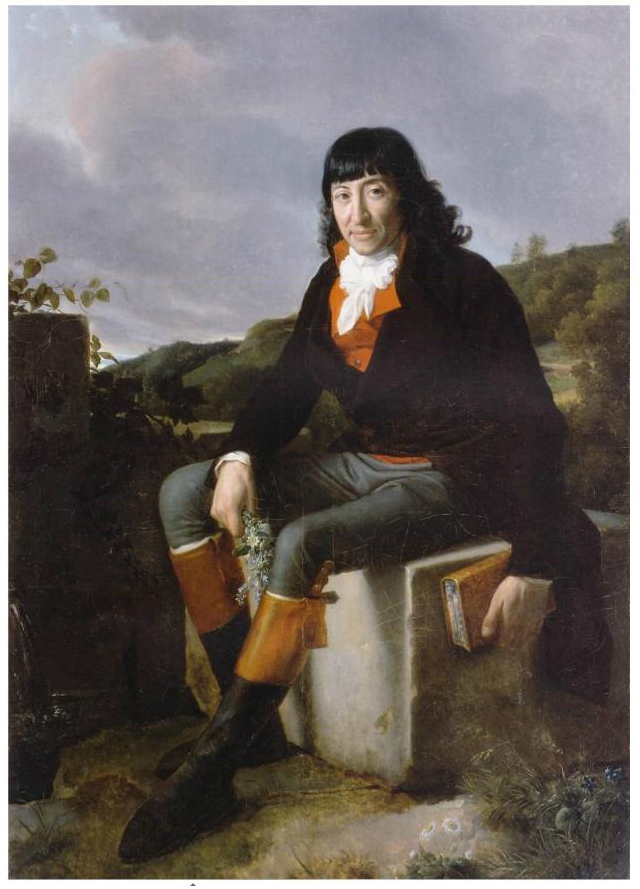
Portrait of La Révellière-Lépeaux as a botanist, by François Gérard, 1798, Musée des Beaux-Arts d'Angers

La Révellière-Lépeaux invited Renou to Paris in 1798, where he was allowed to receive objects from the National Museum of Natural History, including a group of 12 fossil fish brought from Italy (Monte Bolca) by Bonaparte in 1797, which still exists with their original labels.

=== Public museum ===
The collection finally opened its doors to the public as a Museum of Natural History on 5 May 1801. In 1805, when the Central School was abolished, the museum became municipal, while remaining in the Barrault House, together with the Museum of Fine Arts.

The Muséum d'Angers quickly attracted interest and more items were acquired. In 1806, Étienne Geoffroy Saint-Hilaire (1772–1844), on behalf of the National Museum, sent important fossils and casts to the Muséum d'Angers. The number of visitors is high, but after the death of Renou (1809) the administration of the Museum went through a troubled period.

Guilloteau, the naturalist's assistant, managed the museum during the time of the directors Bastard (who is also director of the Jardin des plantes d'Angers and pays less attention to the museum) and de Tussac (who worked in Paris). In 1821, Auguste Nicaise Desvaux (1784–1856), a botanist, replaced Guilloteau as naturalist's assistant and was appointed director in 1822. Desvaux tries organize the collection and quarrels with the municipality to solve the numerous logistical problems of the museum, without results.

=== Expansion ===
It was only under the direction of Alexandre Boreau (1803–1875) that the museum was enlarged, with new halls on the first floor of the Barrault House being inaugurated in 1849. The same year the museum was enriched with the collection of Pierre-Aimé Millet de la Turtaudière (1783–1873). His collection consisted mainly of fossils from the tuffeau limestone and faluns of Anjou, but today it has almost entirely disappeared. In 1864, a temporary exhibition of geology became a permanent exhibit. In 1871, the Society of Scientific Studies of Anjou (SESA) is established by a group of scholars strongly linked to the museum. In 1883 Alphonse Milne-Edwards (1835–1900), Professor of Ornithology at the National Museum, donated 65 birds to the Muséum d'Angers.

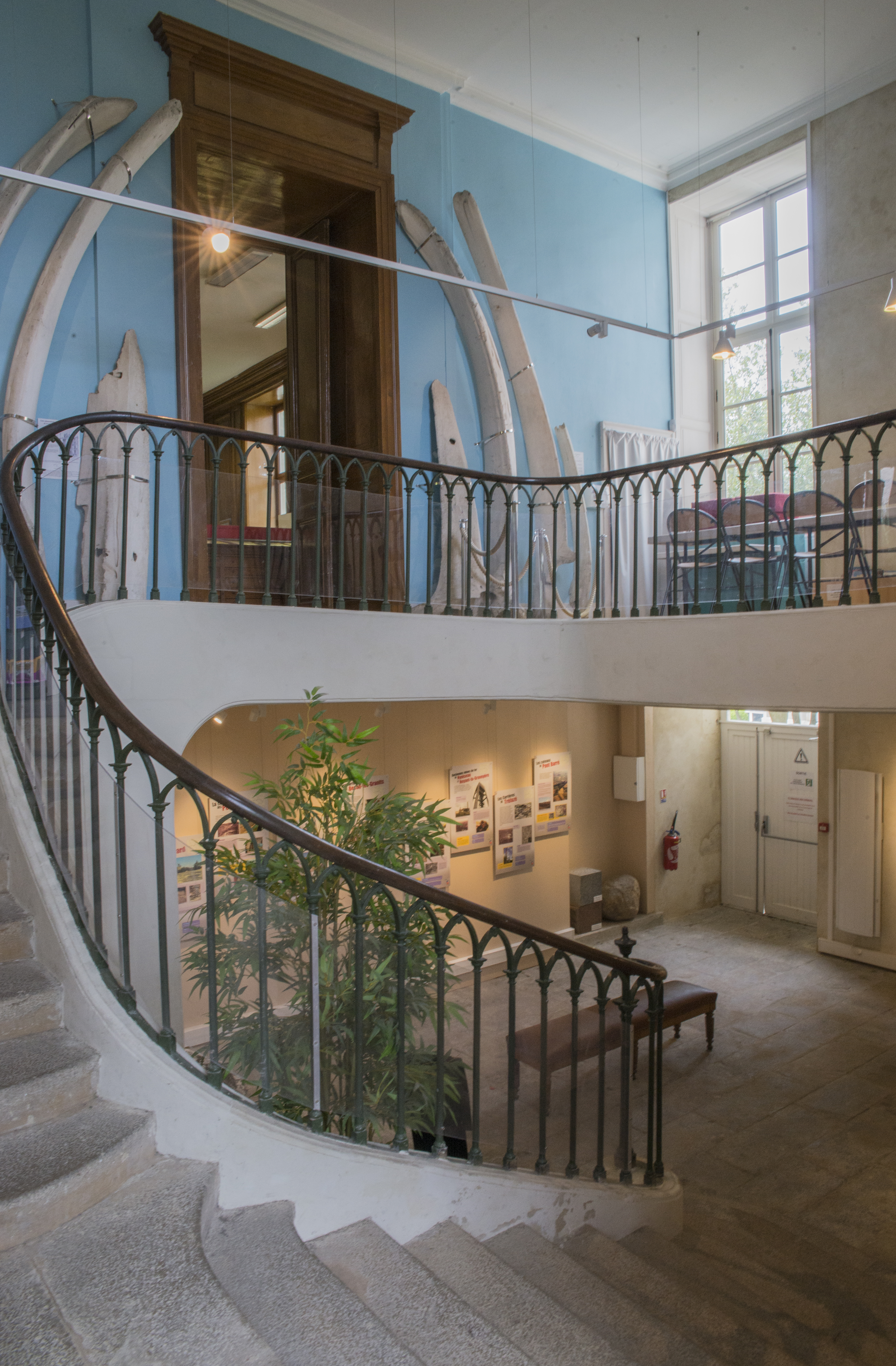
Staircase of the Old Town Hall, Muséum d'Angers

The main site of the museum remained the Barrault House, but in 1885, the town of Angers decided to purchase the Soye collection, which consisted of several thousand fossil samples. At this point, the number of palaeontological specimens becomes too large for the premises and are placed in the Old Town Hall, constituting a Palaeontological Museum. The geological collections joined them soon after. In the same year, a Holzmaden ichthyosaur cast is added to the collections, purchased at the Cantonal Museum of Geology in Lausanne, where the original still stands. An original ichthyosaur fossil from Holzmaden would be added to the collections later.

Botanical collections had been developed in Angers since the creation of the Society of Botanophiles in 1777. Preserved in the Jardin des Plantes during most of the 19th century, the herbaria were re-housed in 1895 in the Old Mansion House, the north wing of the Old Town Hall, adjacent to the Palaeontological Museum. The SESA followed suit. Alexandre Boreau's herbarium was bought by the municipality in 1875, and that of James Lloyd (1810–1896) was bequeathed to the city in 1897. All herbaria have been grouped at the Arboretum Gaston Allard since 1964; the SESA accompanied this move. From 1898 to 2005 these collections formed the Botanical Museum.

Under the director Georges Bouvet (1850–1929) many objects entered the museum (the number of samples has more than quintupled) and a general classification of the specimens was completed. His successor, Olivier Couffon (1882–1937), donated 12,000 local geological and palaeontological samples from his own collection. Prehistory collections were kickstarted at the end of the 19th century, especially thanks to the Paleolithic site of Roc-en-Pail, Chalonnes-sur-Loire (Maine-et-Loire).

=== Growth continues ===
In 1958, under the direction of Philippe Maury (1892–1978), the zoological items left the Barrault House and were installed in the Demarie-Valentin House, which became the Zoological Museum, near the Paleontological Museum. The Zoological Museum opened its doors on 29 April 1963. The two establishments were eventually reunited to recreate the Museum of Natural History in 1990, and the two buildings were connected in 1991 through a path along the ancient walls of the town of Angers, allowing visitors a continuous journey between the zoological rooms and the palaeontology gallery. In 2005 the Botanical Museum, while remaining on the site of the Arboretum, was absorbed by the Museum of Natural History, which changed its designation to the Museum of Natural Sciences. On 1 January 2017, the Muséum d'Angers was attached administratively to the other five museums of the town of Angers, under the same directorship.

=== Continuity and integrity ===
Unlike most other natural history museums in France, the Muséum d'Angers and its collections have not suffered from either of the two World Wars. Moreover, no fire, flood or disaster destroyed or damaged the museum's collections; the greatest hazard being the Vendean pillage in 1793. Even if, over time, many pieces have been lost, even stolen, the Muséum d'Angers retains a rare continuity and integrity for a museum more than 200 years old.

== Museum Missions ==
The Muséum d'Angers follows the National Museum by adopting five main missions: curation of collections, dissemination of knowledge, expertise, pedagogy, and scientific research (yet the latter two are only achieved in Angers through mediation, object loans and hosting of trainees and external researchers; a scientific project is sometimes set up under the purview of the Muséum). It is part of networks dedicated to museums and contributes to national and international patrimonial databases for the benefit of scientists and the general public. The Muséum d'Angers subscribes to ICOM's definition of museum and is thus "a non-profit, permanent institution in the service of society and its development, open to the public, which acquires, conserves, researches, communicates and exhibits the tangible and intangible heritage of humanity and its environment for the purposes of education, study and enjoyment". The Muséum d'Angers is labeled "Musée de France", law nr 2002-5 of 4 January 2002.

== Buildings ==
The Muséum d'Angers is established in two sites: the central site of the museum, in the town centre of Angers, and the site of the Arboretum Gaston Allard.

=== Central Site ===
The central site is housed in two buildings of distinct origins, connected by a small garden sitting on top of the medieval walls, the Demarie-Valentin House and the Old Town Hall.

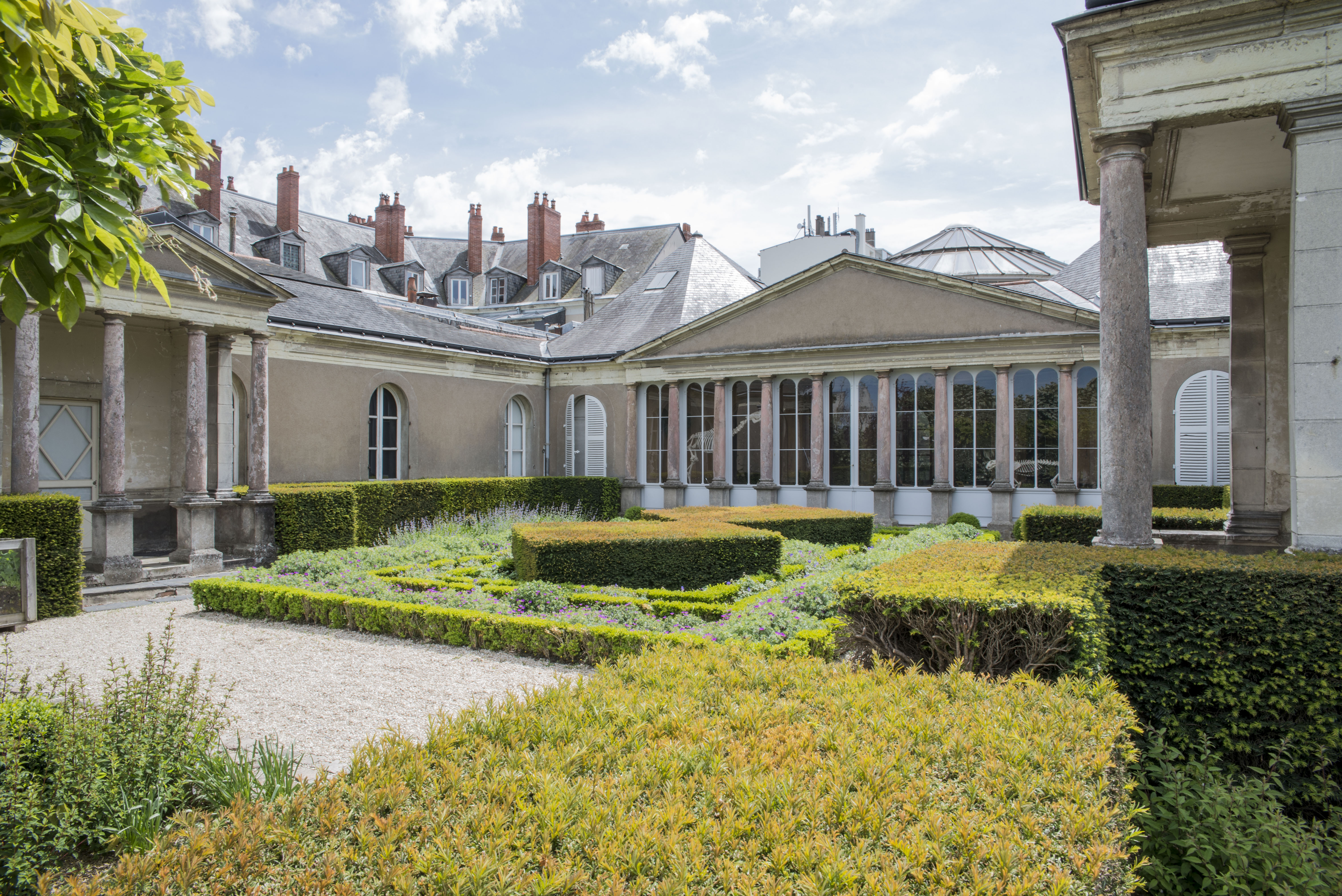
Garden and colonnade of Hôtel Demarie-Valentin, Muséum d'Angers

The Demarie-Valentin House was built by Jean-François Demarie around 1800 on the site of the former parish church of Saint-Michel-du-Tertre, destroyed during the Revolution. The interior layout of the Demarie-Valentin House is surprisingly unique in its neoclassical style: through the front door, a high staircase leads on to a round courtyard dominated by a circular balcony. The garden vestibule connects two octagonal rooms together, each in its turn giving passage toward wings embracing the garden; a colonnade lends the garden façade an "antique" allure. Bequeathed to the city of Angers by its last owner in 1958, the house was used to host the zoology collections. This building houses the museum's reception desk, the laboratory of taxidermy-restoration and part of the reserves. The Demarie-Valentin House has been registered as a national heritage site (Monument historique) since 28 August 1995.

The Old Town Hall dates from the 13th century. The palaeontology collections have been installed, since 1885, in the former Great Hall of the Municipal Council (1529–1823, then the Great Chamber of the Court of Appeal between 1823 and 1885), which includes beautiful wood panelling and a door carved by the woodcarver Pierre-Louis David, father of the famous Angevin sculptor of the same name, known as David d'Angers. Today, the office of the director, other working offices, the library and part of the reserves are housed in this building.

=== Arboretum Site ===
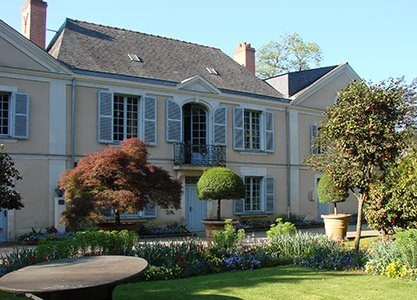
Maison Allard à l'Arboretum Gaston-Allard, Muséum d'Angers

The site of the Arboretum Gaston Allard mostly houses herbarium collections in the residence of Gaston Allard (1838–1918). Allard, an Angevin botanist, started the plantations around his beautiful mansion of the Maulévrie in 1863. The creation of the Arboretum dates back to 1882. In 1916, Allard donated his Arboretum to the Pasteur Institute. In 1959, the town of Angers bought back the Arboretum Gaston Allard from the Pasteur Institute. The site also hosts the Société d'études scientifiques de l'Anjou and the Society of Horticulture of Angers and Maine-et-Loire.

== Museum life ==
A museum is not composed only of showcases and visitors: there is at the Muséum d'Angers a dynamics often unknown to the public.

The welcome team is the most visible face for visitors. Responsible for ticket sale, surveillance of exhibition rooms, monitoring of exhibits, and visitor safety, welcome agents are the hinge between the public and other professionals behind the scenes of the museum.

The curators are responsible for the preservation and management of the collections as well as for the setting up of permanent and temporary exhibitions. The laboratory, with its taxidermist-conservator, is equipped for the preparation of specimens dedicated to exhibitions, conservation or even research. A technical team can intervene for the manufacture of showcases, shelves, storage, transport, etc. From time to time, the Museum's collections are enriched by donations from individuals or institutions seeking long-term conservation of their collections, which are often carefully collected throughout a lifetime, and it is up to these professionals to take Decision whether to accept them or not, to restore them or not, to expose them or not.

The collections of the Muséum d'Angers are constantly in demand by researchers, trainees, students, teachers. The museum welcomes also volunteers and temporary staff to work on particular points of its collections. These are either scientists or amateurs specialized in particular fields, for example, beetles, paleobotany or malacology. Proofing, inventory and digitization campaigns are underway, particularly in the fields of herbaria, entomology and malacology. Loans of specimens for exhibitions, research or teaching are also regular.

The scientific library contains approximately 6,000 documents (distributed on the central site and the site of the Arboretum) for the disciplines related to the collections.

The mediation team organizes workshops and guided tours for school groups, families and the general public, using high-quality teaching materials (including a variety of animal skull models, educational games and thematic publications). As the Muséum d'Angers is part of an environmental education programme, themes and pedagogical cards adapted to all school grades are available for teachers. An activities programme for the young is offered, especially during school holidays. Other activities of scientific and cultural mediation are organized, including animations, conferences and even artistic events.

Finally, the Muséum d'Angers participates every year in international cultural events such as the European Heritage Days and the Long Night of Museums.

== Collections ==
The collections of the Muséum d'Angers are classified in four major scientific fields: botany, zoology, earth sciences, and prehistory. The museum also preserves minor collections of ethnology, technology and fine arts. It continues to be enriched with donations, customs seizures and new acquisitions.

The oldest preserved object is a trilobite fossil of the genus Paradoxides from the Cambrian period, about 500 million years old. Historically the oldest objects are 18th century herbaria specimens (and even a few from the 17th century). Herbaria and animal taxidermy from before the 19th century have a considerable heritage value, but the largest part of the collections came from the 19th and 20th centuries. In botany, zoology and palaeontology, the collections of the Muséum d'Angers house several type-specimens, including Asteraceae, Lepidoptera and Trilobita.

=== Botany ===
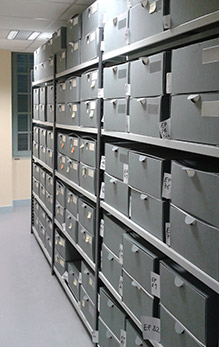
Part of the herbaria reserves, Muséum d'Angers

The botanical collections represent numerically the greatest heritage in the Muséum d'Angers, with more than half of the total number of museum objects. The herbaria contain more than 350,000 samples, mainly dating from the nineteenth century. They are organised around three important collections: the general herbarium, that of Alexandre Boreau, and that of James Lloyd, the three herbaria together making up about 80% of the total samples.

The general herbarium contains several type-specimens, including types from the island of Réunion, the collections of Philibert Commerson (voyage of Bougainville), Jacques Labillardière (expedition of Entrecasteaux), Pierre Antoine Poiteau (Santo Domingo) and even some rare samples from the seventeenth century.

The Boreau herbarium contains probably more than 100,000 samples, including material used for the writing of the Flore du centre de la France, the most famous regional flora of its time.

The Lloyd herbarium (100,000 collections) contains 24,000 species, the basis of the Flore de l'ouest de la France; the bequest included Lloyd's imposing library. There are also herbaria of mosses (Bouvet, Bruneau), lichens (Decuillé, Thuillier), fungi (Gaillard, Guépin, Rabenhorst) and algae (Lloyd, Bory, Corillion).

Specialised herbaria are also preserved in Angers, including one of the most important botany collections (herbaria of the genus Rubus) in Europe. A seed library is made up, on one hand, of pedagogical samples (about 1,000 French and 200 tropical species) and, on the other hand, the Vilmorin collection of early 20th century tree seeds, with additions from the National Museum and from Roland Bonaparte (approximately 1,100 samples). The xylotheque, also made up of two parts, comprises wood specimens from trees from the Jardin des Plantes and the Gaston-Allard Arboretum, both in Angers, as well as a collection of 69 samples of French Guyanese precious woods collected in 1802.

=== Zoology ===
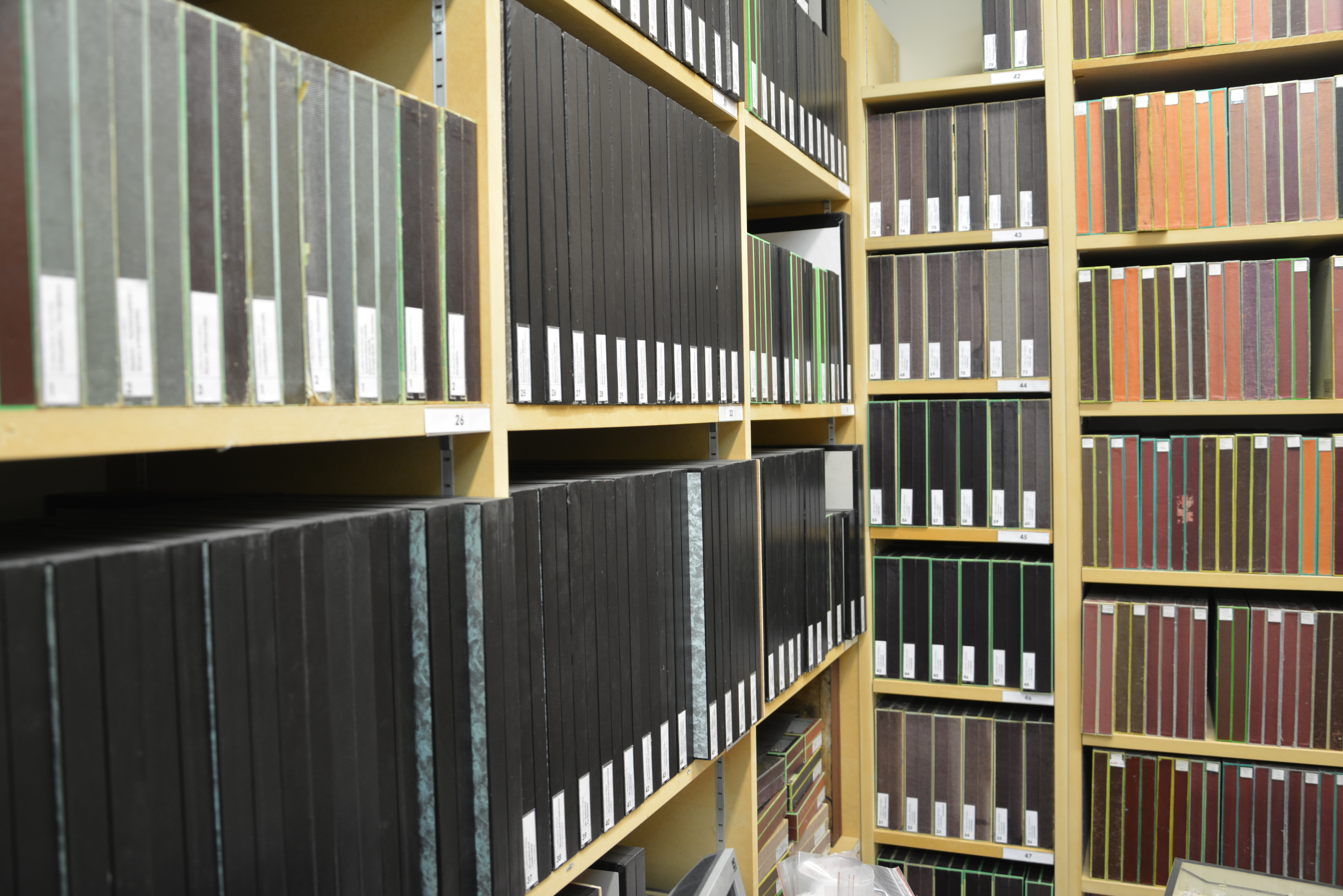
Pinned insects in boxes stored vertically in the entomology reserves, Muséum d'Angers

In the field of zoology, the Muséum d'Angers holds collections in entomology (80,000 specimens), malacology (20,000 specimens), ornithology (4,142, including oology and nidology), mammalogy (474 specimens), herpetology (410 specimens), ichthyology (139 specimens) and marine invertebrates (over one hundred specimens). Apart from taxidermised specimens, there are osteological specimens, teratological specimens, specimens in liquid, casts, models etc.

Of special interest is the reconstitution of the cabinet of the Angevin entomologist Gustave Abot (1843–1926), specialist on beetles of Maine-et-Loire. The Muséum d'Angers houses the reference collection of spiders of Maine-et-Loire. It also retains the Servain and Surrault collections (freshwater malacology), which together with the Letourneux collection (world malacology) form a remarkable ensemble. With the Boursicot legacy in 1999, the zoology collections gained tens of thousands of specimens, especially insects and shells.

In addition, the ornithological collections are particularly rich, with eggs, nests and taxidermy of all of the birds of Maine-et-Loire. There are also specimens belonging to extinct species, including a Carolina parakeet and a passenger pigeon; casts of an Aepyornis egg and of a moa's leg bones can be seen. There are also historical specimens, including one of the last sturgeons fished out in the Loire in 1811, and cetacean bones of the same period. Among the last remarkable acquisitions, the arrival of an okapi (accompanied by its skeleton) is noteworthy.

=== Earth sciences ===
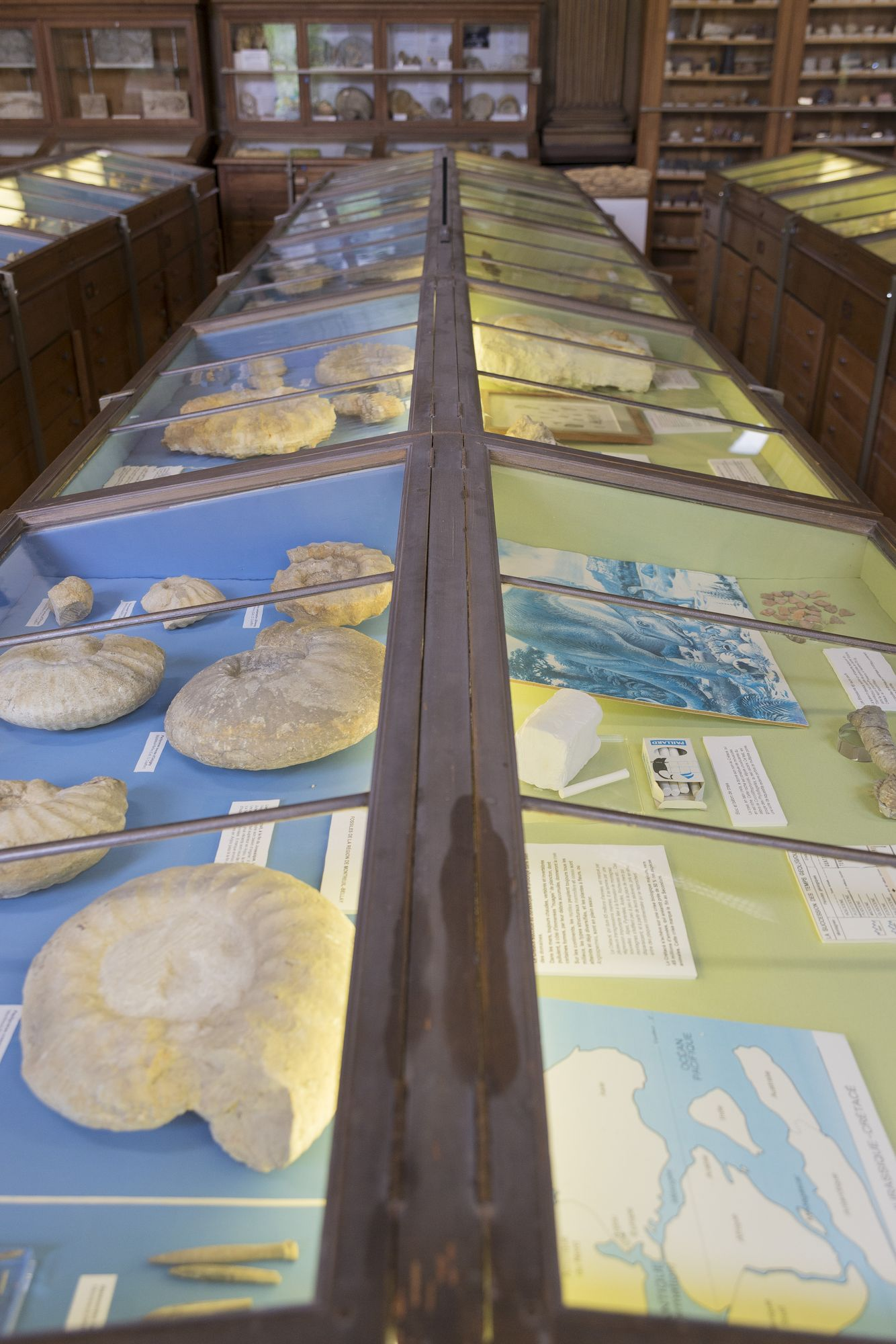
Palaeontology exhibits and reserves in drawers, Muséum d'Angers

The Muséum d'Angers has important collections of paleontology (50,000 fossils, including palaeobotany, paleozoology and paleoichnology) tracing the history of life since the Cambrian, 500 million years ago. The Maine-et-Loire fossils come mainly from local Cretaceous tuffeau limestone and Tertiary faluns, but also from fossiliferous Armorican levels such as Ordovician or Devonian. A composite skeleton of the Miocene fossil sirenian Metaxytherium medium, an ancestor of the extant dugong, is a major asset of the palaeontological collections.

Mineralogy (5,000 samples, of which 2,000 are from Maine-et-Loire) and petrography (600 samples) include a collection of slates, a monumental block of sharp acicular quartz, samples of native gold and meteorites. The meteorite of L'Aigle, which fell in 1803 at L'Aigle (Orne, Normandy), is at the origin of the study of meteorites. The meteorite of Angers fell in 1822 (3 June, 8:15 pm) in Angers (La Doutre), it is classified L6, chondrite with olivine. A native gold nugget found at Blaison-Gohier (Maine-et-Loire) is exhibited, as well as a sample of native apatite lamellar gold, found around 1858 on the road going from Rennes to Nantes – one of the rare samples known in the region (they exist only in the National Museum in Paris and in Nantes). Other samples are mainly French regional minerals, and minerals from Madagascar and Chile, yet all mineral families are present.

=== Prehistory ===
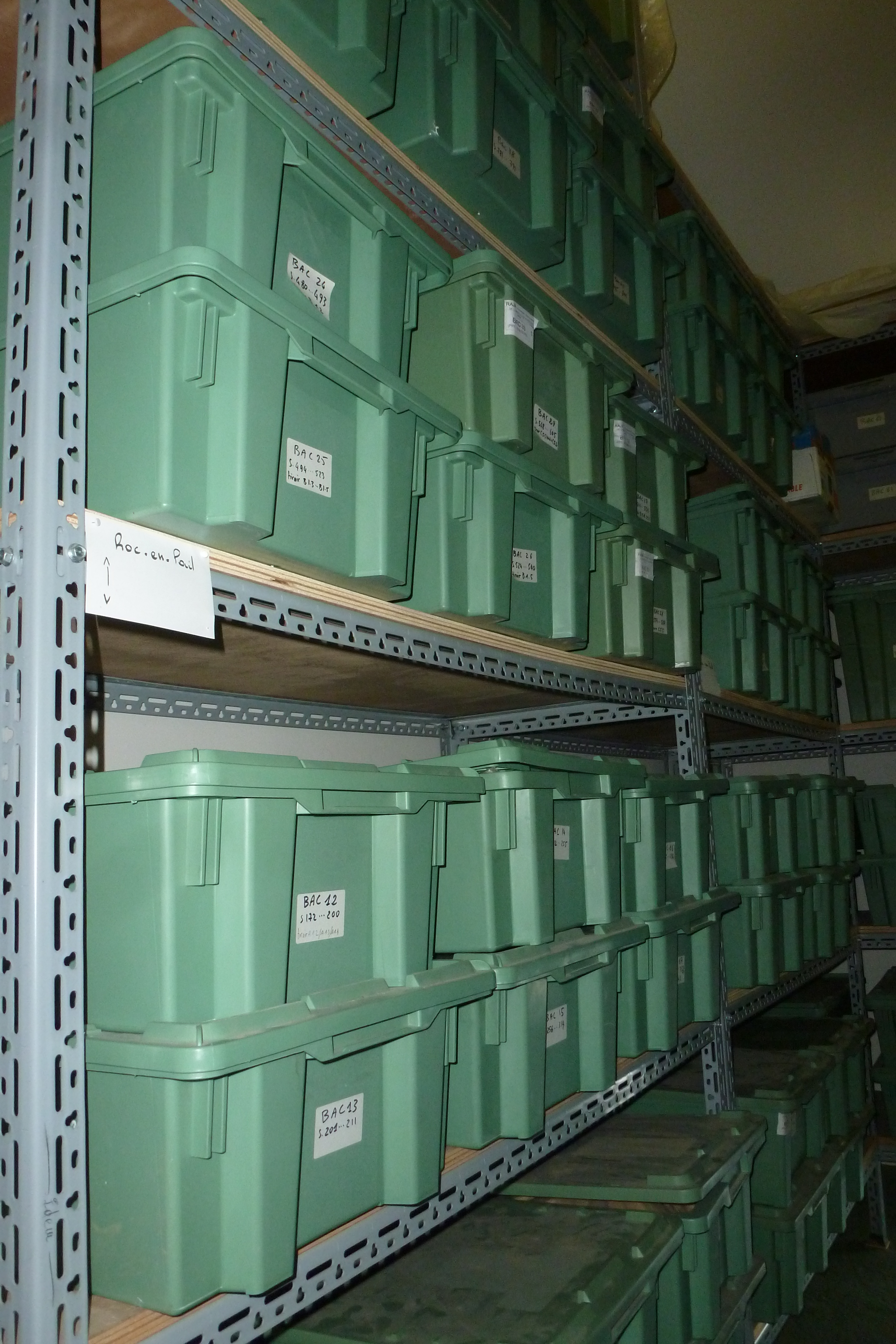
Boxes stored in the prehistory reserves, Muséum d'Angers

The collections of prehistory total about 30,000 objects mainly from the Paleolithic site of Roc-en-Pail. Known since the beginning of the 20th century, the site of Roc-en-Pail, in Chalonnes-sur-Loire, has yielded a great diversity of objects: mammoth teeth, reindeer antlers, various bones and lithic tools, evidence of an ancient human occupation of the site. The systematic excavations of Michel Gruet (1912–1998) in the 1940s–1980s were particularly fortunate, and the discovery of Neanderthal bones (maxilla, isolated tooth and humerus), partially exhibited at the Muséum d'Angers, confirmed the importance of the site for the study of prehistory in Anjou and in Europe. New excavation campaigns at Roc-en-Pail are underway and the resulting material will also become part of the collections of the Muséum d'Angers. The permanent exhibition of prehistory has recently been enriched with display cases relating to human evolution, including a display of fossil skull casts on the human phylogenetic tree and a primatology installation.

== Specimens ==
Scientific

- Type-specimens (plants, insects, fossils)
- Reference collections (spiders of Maine-et-Loire)

Historic

- Patrin herbarium (1780–1783)
- Monte Bolca fossil fish (acquired by Bonaparte 1797)
- Crocodile (accessioned 1798)
- Pangolin (transferred from Paris 1798)
- Sturgeon (fished in the Loire 1811)

Botany

- herbaria: Lloyd's algae, Rubus herbarium
- carpothèque: sea coconut, vegetable ivory
- xylothèque: French Guiana rosewood

Zoology

- entomology: Abot collection
- malacology: exotic marine fauna, and local fresh water fauna
- ornithology: passenger pigeon; great auk's egg; kākāpō
- mammalogy: okapi; several big cat spécimens
- herpetology: tortoises (mounted with hinge opening); Blomberg's toad
- ichthyology: ocean sunfish; "fish herbarium"
- marine invertebrates: Indian Ocean corals

Earth Sciences

- palaeozoology: Metaxytherium; plesiosaur
- palaeobotany: plant fossils in sandstone; Lepidodendron
- palaeoichnology: dinosaur tracks
- mineralogy: native gold nugget; monumental block of acicular quartz
- petrography: meteorite of Angers; slates

Prehistory

- Roc-en-Pail: Neanderthal bones

== Temporary exhibitions ==
2019 « Insula Utopia / Inventaire du Ciel », works and installations by Richard Rak
2018 « Hungry Planet », photography by Peter Menzel and Faith d'Aluisio
2018 « La grande parade des animaux », at the Musée des Beaux-Arts d'Angers
2018 « HerbEnLoire : trésors retrouvés »
2017 « Les animaux du noir », photography by Katrin Backes and Sylvain Tanquerel
2017 « Drôles d'oiseaux »
2016 « L'aventure botanique des Caraïbes aux bords de la Loire »
2015 « Bestioles d'Anjou », photography by Sylvie Mercier
2015 « Gravex naturalis : espèce en voie d'exposition »
2015 « Sols fertiles, vie secrètes »
2014 « Zoos humains : l'invention du sauvage »
2014 « Traces des absents », works by Hélène Gay
2014 « Récolement ? ... ça colle ! 10 ans de récolement des collections »
2014 « Portraits de famille », works by Hélène Benzacar
2014 « Flore », paintings by Catherine Brasebin
2013 « Espèces en folie »
2013 « Alarme et camouflage »
2012 « Écorces », photography by Cédric Pollet
2012 « Art d'ici : univers singuliers », painting/sculpture (Société des Artistes Angevins)
2011 « Safari urbain », photography by Laurent Geslin
2011 « Abriter les papillons », at the Arboretum Gaston-Allard
2010 « Biodiversité : le Muséum sort de sa réserve »
2009 « Darwin : mission Galápagos », bicentennial
2009 « J'ai capturé dans mes filets », writing by Thérèse Bonnétat and tapestries by Muriel Crochet
2008 « L'Anjou sous nos pieds », geology of Anjou
2008 « Curieuses invitées », works by Juliette Vicart
2008 « L'animal griffé », drawings and sculptures by Delphine Izzo
2007 « Double visite : 5 artistes au Muséum »
2007 « Nom : Carl v. Linné, Profession : naturaliste », tricentennial
2006 « Amazone nature »
2006 « Ligne du Monde »
2006 « Naturellement Loire... une escale en Anjou »
2005 « Réserves », photography by Hélène Benzacar »
2005 « Voyage dans la troisième dimension », hologrammes
2005 « Photographes de nature », photography by BBC Wildlife Magazine
2005 « Chauves-souris de chez nous »
2004 « Forêt ou le frémissement des limbes », photography by Laurent Vergne
2004 « Histoires naturelles », works by Sylvie Mercier de Flandre
2004 « La faune du Mali »
2003 « Algérie, deux millions d'années d'histoire : les premiers habitants »
2003 « Madagascar : l'île aux trésors »
2002 « Félins du monde »
2002 « Lumières Polaires et aurores boréales », photography by Rémy Marion
2001 « Rue des Sciences : les noms de rues dédiés aux scientifiques »
2001 « La Nature, quelle artiste »
2001 « Paysage du monde, paysage d'Anjou »
2000 « Le pétrole dans tous ces états », Fête de la Science
2000 « La ménagerie du roi René »
1999 « Trésors botaniques d'Angers »
1999 « Le petit peuple des champs et des bois », photography by Michel Beucher
1998 « Rêveur au long cours », installations by Richard Rak
1996 « Ages et images de la terre »
1994 « Baleines en vue »
1993 « Point Info dinosaures »
1990 « Roc en Pail – 50 000 ans de préhistoire angevine », an exhibition presenting results from Michel Gruet's archaeological excavations at Roc-en-Pail; parts of this exhibition can still be visited in the permanent exhibition of the Muséum d'Angers

== Visitors ==
Number of visitors per year (2001–2010)
2001	2002	2003	2004	2005	2006	2007	2008	2009	2010
11,410	16,976	15,235	15,400	13,887	11,295	14,553	15,550	16,025	17,068

Number of visitors per year (2011–2020)
2011	2012	2013	2014	2015	2016	2017	2018	2019	2020
13,751	18,838	17,448	24,432	21,903	21,039	23,942	25,393	27,685	00,000

== Directors ==
=== Muséum ===
1. Joseph-Étienne Renou, 1798–1809
  open to the public 1801
2. Toussaint Bastard, 1809–1816 ^{a}
  - Toussaint Grille, June–October 1816 (par intérim)
3. François Richard de Tussac, 1816–1822 ^{a}
  - Guilloteau, directeur de facto, 1809–1821
  - Desvaux, director de facto, 1821
4. Auguste Nicaise Desvaux, 1822–1838 ^{a}
5. Alexandre Boreau, 1838–1875 ^{a}
6. Émile Lieutaud, 1875–1881 (1^{e} fois) ^{a}
  - Deloche, officieusement directeur, 1875–1881
7. Édouard Louis Trouessart, 1881–1885
8. Émile Lieutaud, 1885–1895 (2^{e} fois) ^{b}
9. Georges Bouvet, 1895–1929 ^{a, b, c}
10. Olivier Couffon, 1929–1937 ^{b}
11. Joseph Péneau, 1937–1944 ^{b}
12. Philippe Maury, 1944–1976 ^{d, e}
13. Michel Gruet, 1976–1990 ^{e}
  - Catherine Lesseur, January 1991 – 1993 (par intérim)
14. Robert Jullien, 1993–2000
15. Vincent Dennys, 2001–2015
  - Benoît Mellier, January–December 2016 (par intérim)
16. Anne Esnault, depuis 2017
  merger with Musées d'Angers in 2017

=== Musée Botanique ===
1. Albert Gaillard, 1898–1903
2. Georges Bouvet, 1904–1929 ^{c}
3. Ernest Préaubert, 1930–1933
4. Georges Bioret, 1934–1953
5. Robert Corillion, 1953–1956 (1^{e} fois)
6. Philippe Maury, 1957–1976 ^{d}
7. Robert Corillion, 1977–1988 (2^{e} fois)
8. Denise Moreau, 1988–2010
  merger with the Muséum in 2005

^{a} at the same time Director of the Jardin des plantes d'Angers
^{b} at the same time Director of the Musée Paléontologique (créé 1885)
^{c} Georges Bouvet was at the same time Director of the Muséum and of the Musée Paléontologique (1895–1929), Director of the Jardin des plantes (1895–1929) and Director of the Musée Botanique (1904–1929)
^{d} Philippe Maury was at the same time Director of both Musées Paléontologique and Zoologique (established 1958) and Director of the Musée Botanique
^{e} Director of both Musées Paléontologique and Zoologique, reunited in 1990

== Gallery ==
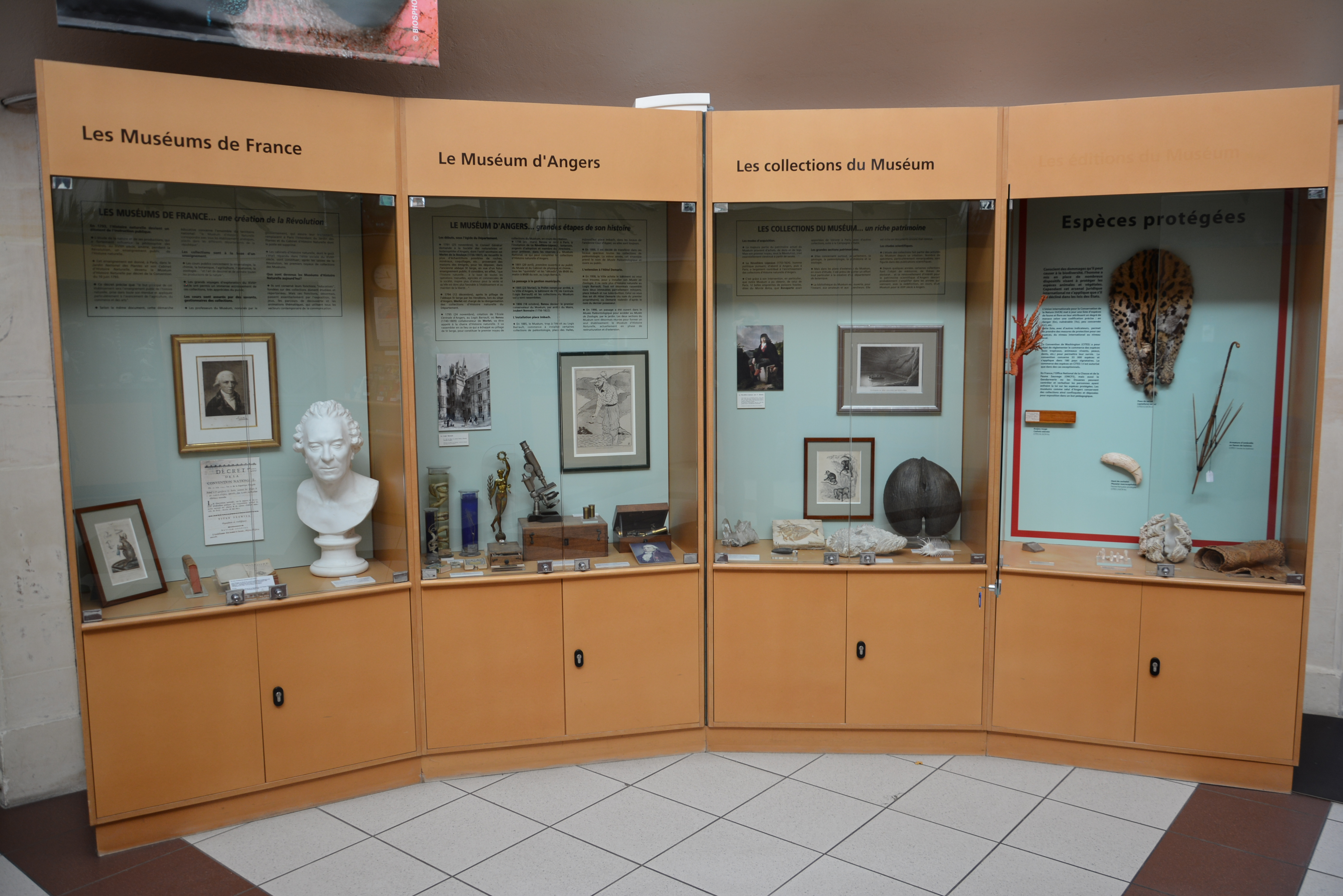
Exhibits in the round courtyard, Muséum d'Angers

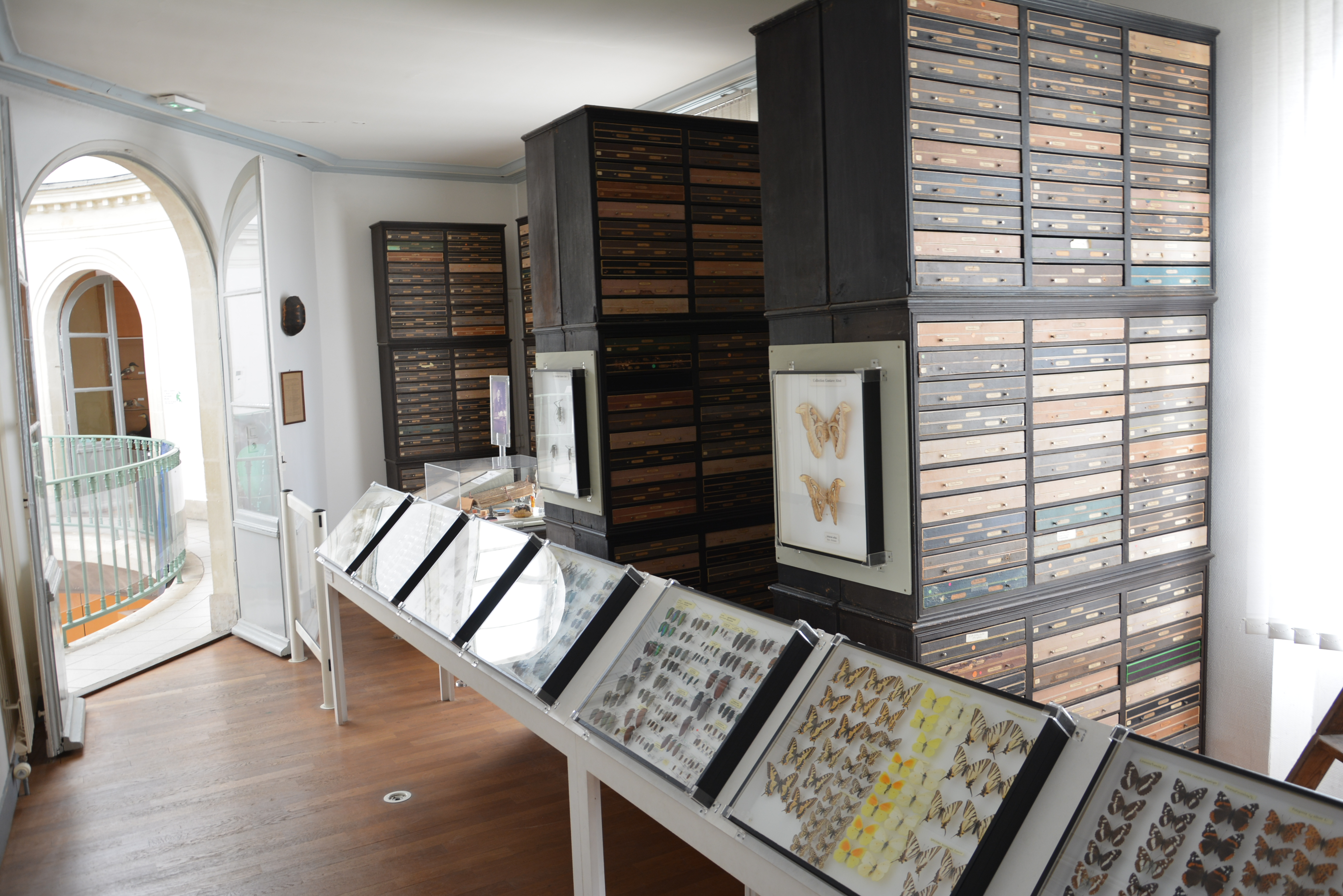
Abot's Entomology Gallery, Muséum d'Angers

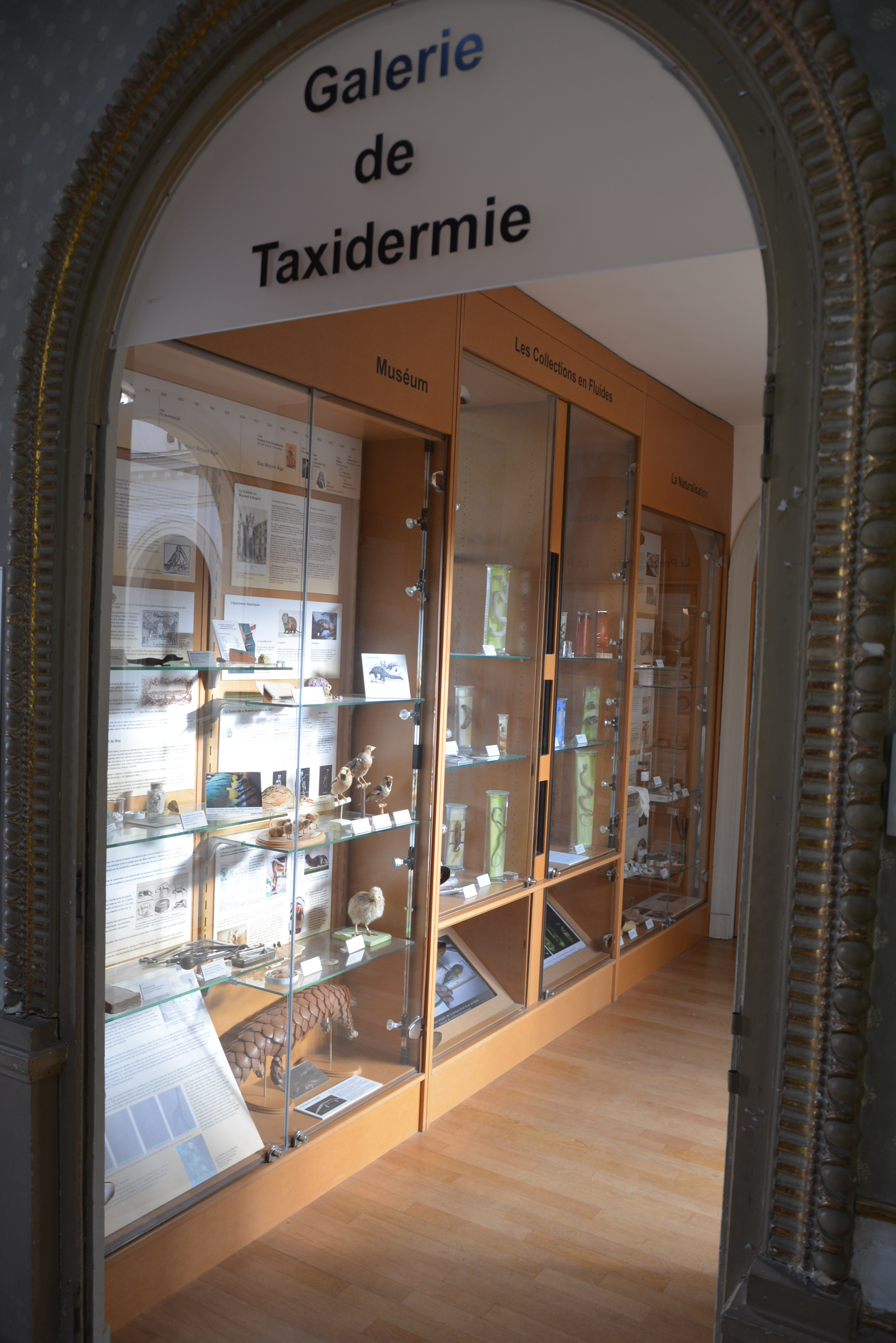
Taxidermy Gallery, Muséum d'Angers

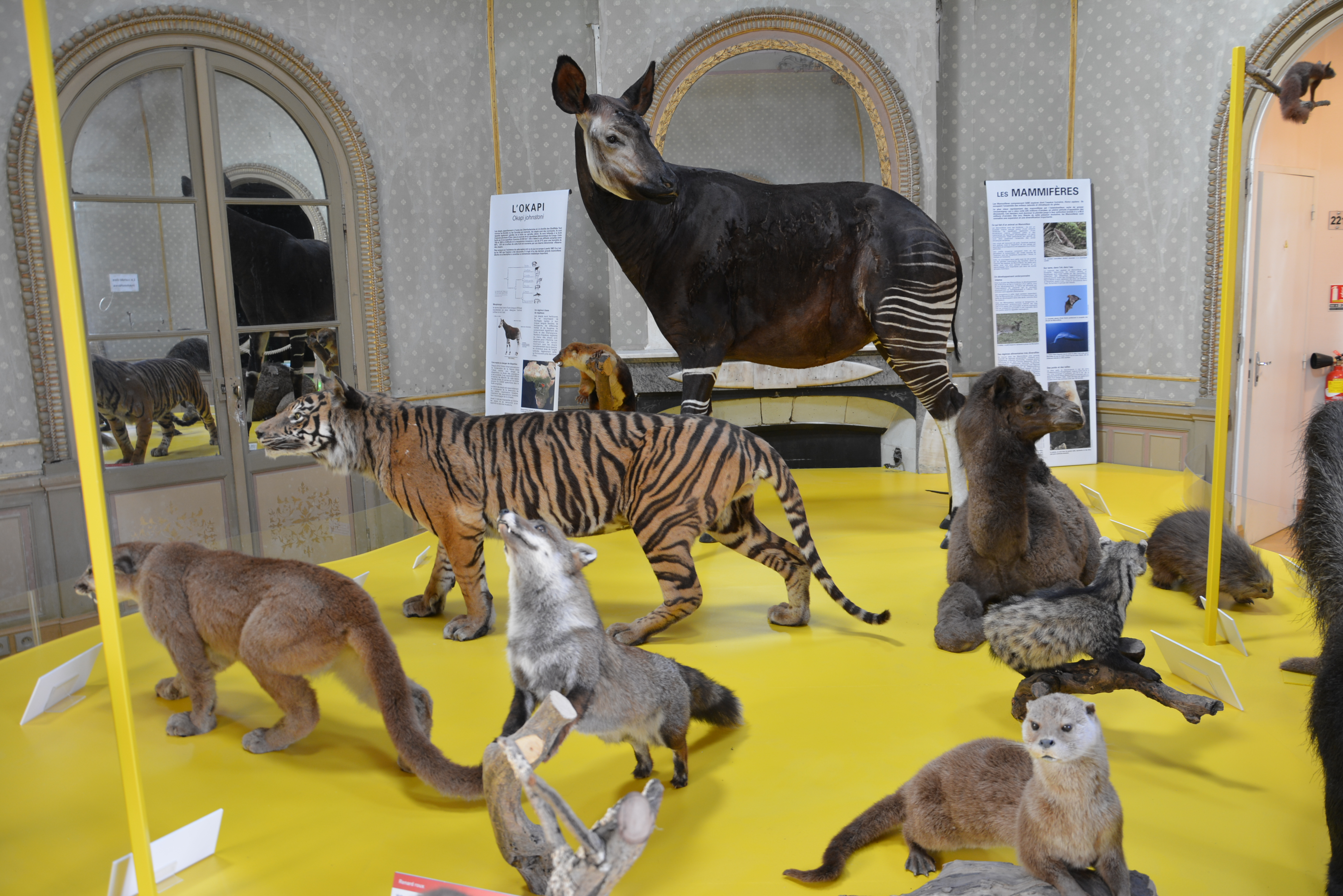
Mammals' Podium, Muséum d'Angers

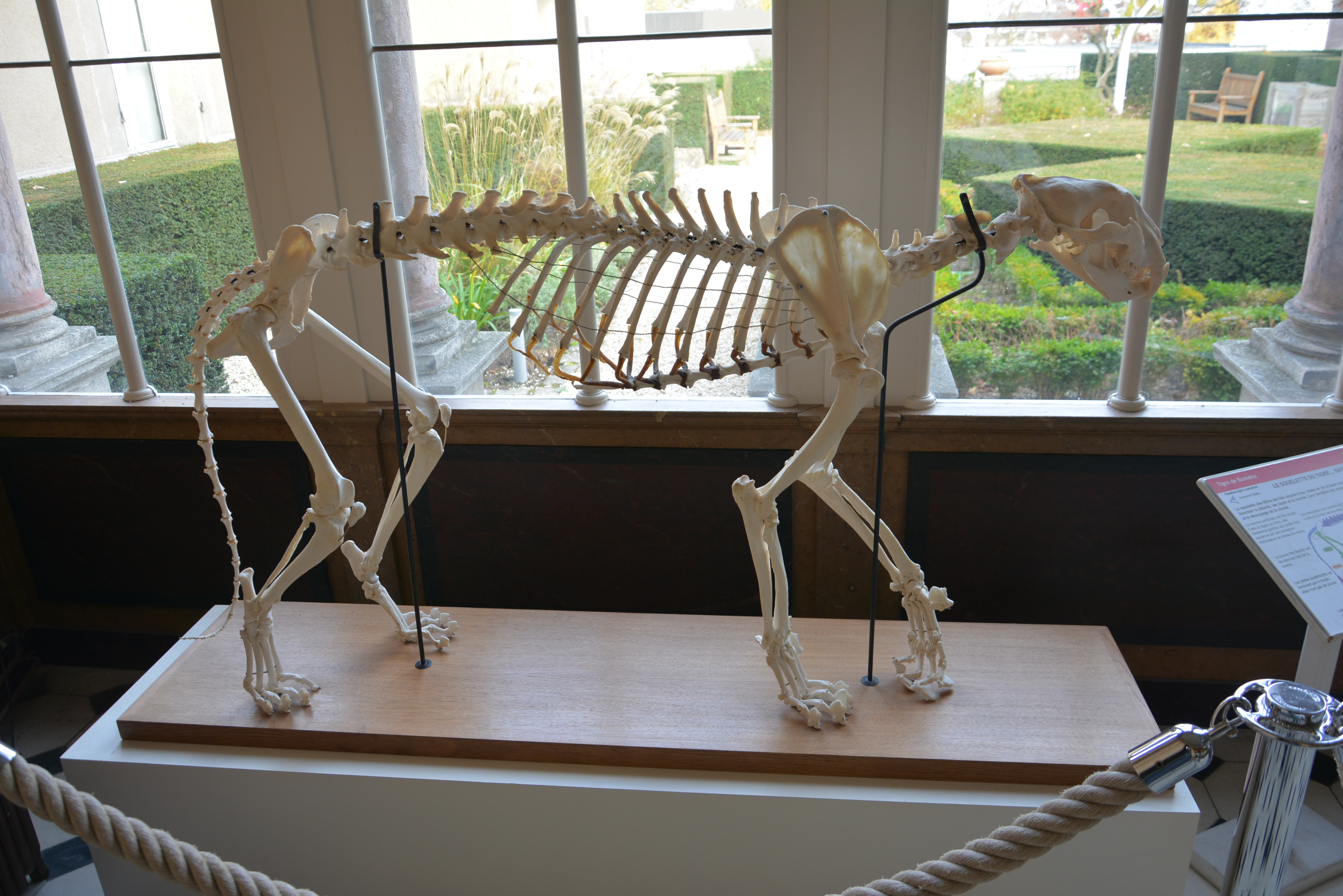
Female tigre skeleton, Panthera tigris, Muséum d'Angers

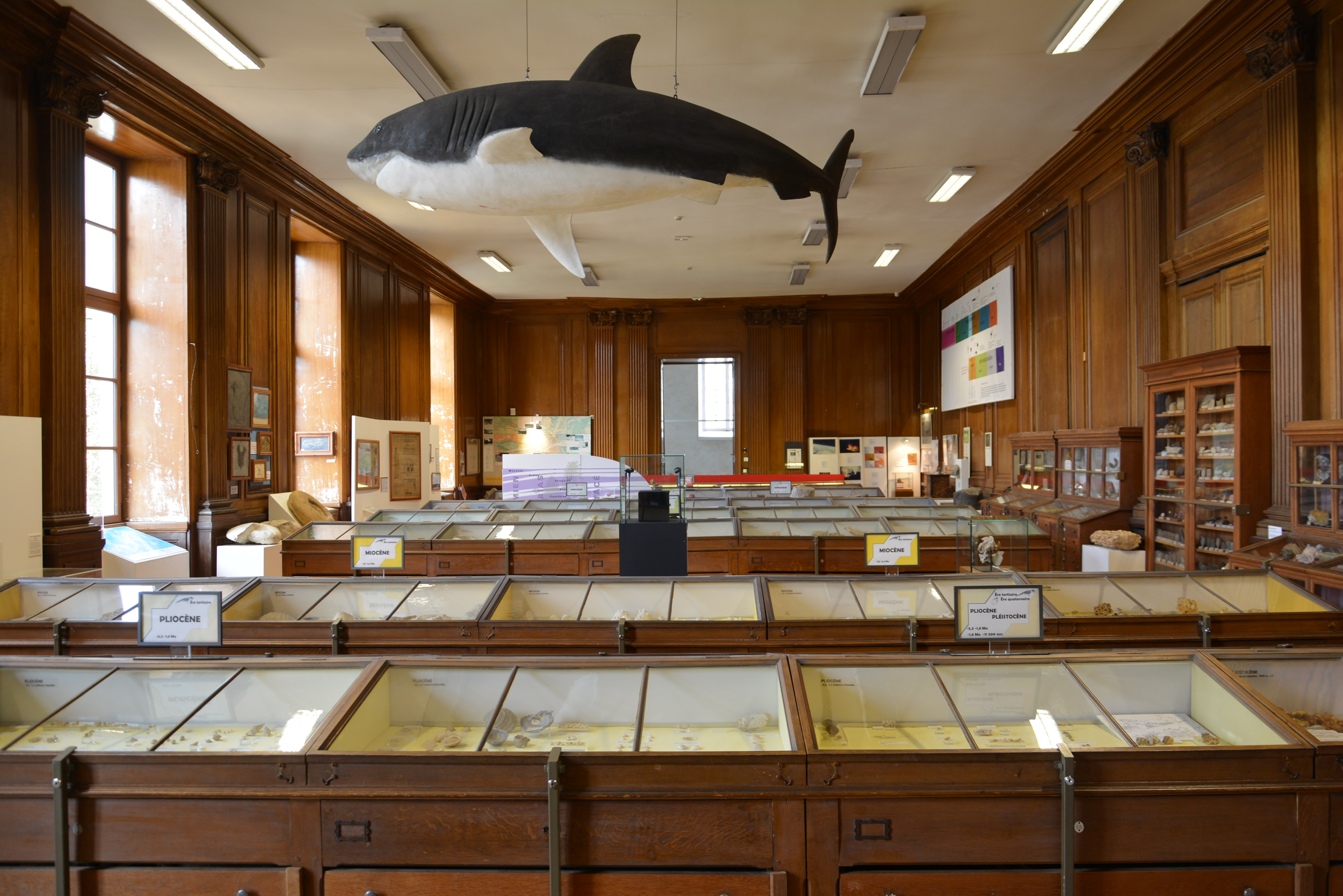
Palaeontology Gallery, Muséum d'Angers

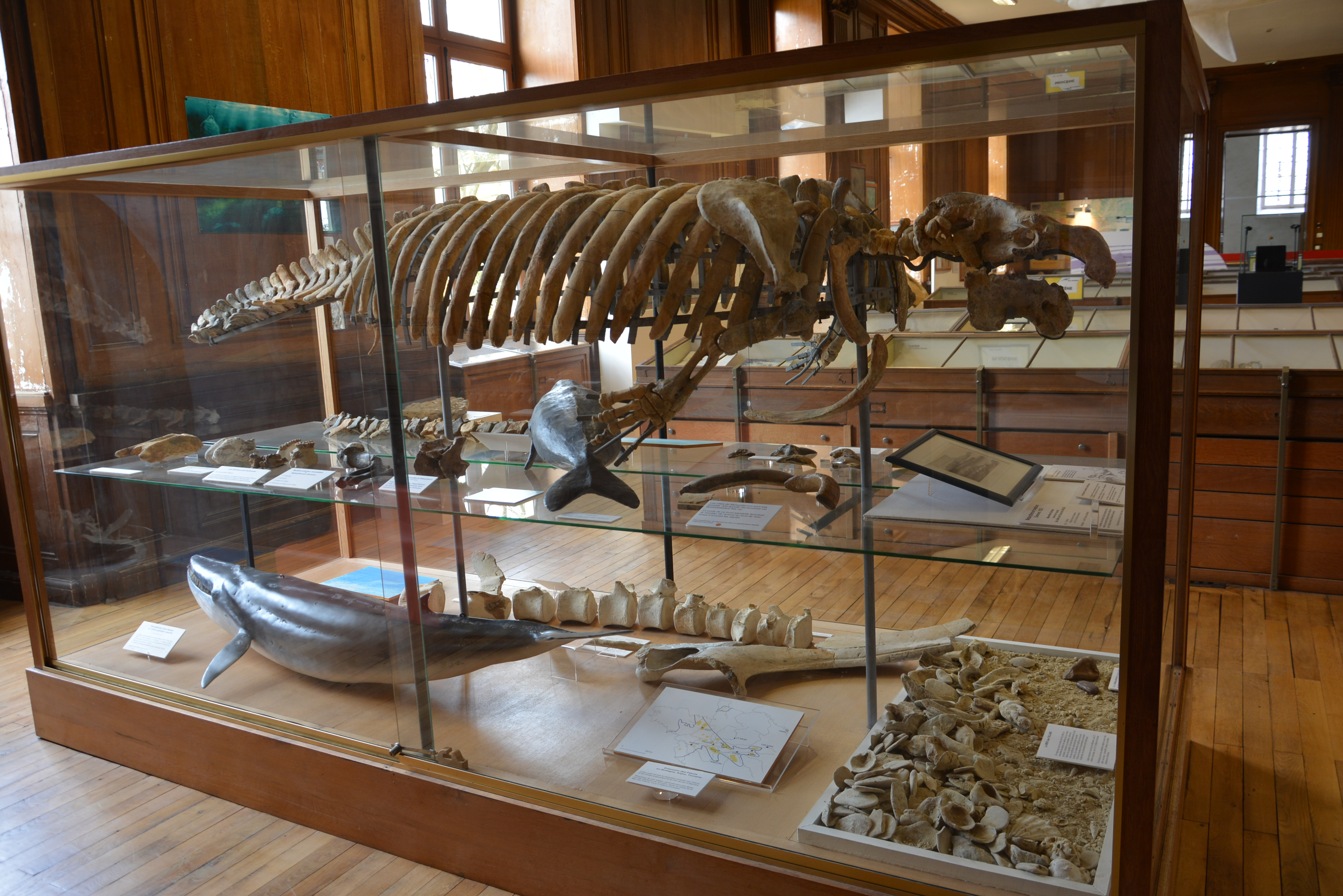
Metaxytherium medium composite skeleton, Muséum d'Angers

== See also ==
=== Related articles ===
- List of museums in Maine-et-Loire
- List of natural history museums
