= Poche =

Poche is the French word for pocket. It can refer to:

== People ==
- Colin Poche (born 1994), American baseball player
- Felix Pierre Poché (1836–1895), American justice of the Louisiana Supreme Court
- Fred Poché (born 1960), French philosopher
- Jared Poché (born 1994), American baseball player
- Miroslav Poche (born 1978), Czech politician
- Oswald Poche (1908–1962), German Nazi military figure, chief of the Gestapo

See also

- Mauricio Pochettino (born 1972), Argentinian former footballer and manager of Tottenham Hotspur

== Places ==
- Poche Beach, in San Clemente, California
- Habère-Poche, a commune in south-eastern France

== Other ==
- Amour de poche, a French comedy fantasy film from 1957
- Chat en poche, a comedy in three acts by Georges Feydeau from 1892
- Le Livre de Poche ("The Pocket Book"), a publishing brand name in France since 1953
- Pochette, French name for a kit violin
- Télé Poche ("Pocket TV"), a weekly television listings magazine in France since 1966
