= Ralph Savarese =

American academic, writer, poet, and activist

- Occupations: Academic, writer, poet, activist
- Title: Professor
- Spouse: Emily Savarese
- Children: DJ
- Awards: Glascock Poetry Prize (1986); IPPY Award (2008)

Academic background
- Education: Wesleyan University (BA, 1986); University of Florida (MFA, Ph.D.

Academic work
- Discipline: English, Neuroscience, Disability Studies
- Institutions: Grinnell College
- Notable works: Reasonable People (2007); See It Feelingly (2018)

Ralph James Savarese is an American academic, writer, poet, and activist. As of 2024, he is a professor of English, Science, Medicine, and Society at Grinnell College. He is the author of five books, including Reasonable People (2007) and See It Feelingly (2018), and has published several chapbooks and poems.

== Early life and education ==
Savarese earned a Bachelor of Arts in English from Wesleyan University in 1986, graduating Phi Beta Kappa. That year, he won the Glascock Poetry Prize. He then attended the University of Florida, where he received a Master of Fine Arts and Doctor of Philosophy.

== Career ==
Savarese has taught at Deerfield Academy, Keene State College, Adam Mickiewicz University, the University of Florida, Duke University, and the Newberry Library. In 2001, Savarese joined Grinnell College, where he remains as of 2024. From 2012 to 2013, he was a fellow at Duke University's Institute for Brain Sciences, where he explored the idea that autistic people "have an unacknowledged affinity for poetry and make palpable its status as fully embodied knowledge".

In 2003, Savarese received the Henning Cohen Prize from the Herman Melville Society for his contributions to scholarship on Herman Melville.

== Selected publications ==
=== Reasonable People (2007) ===
Reasonable People: A Memoir of Autism and Adoption is a memoir published by Other Press in May 2007. The book shares Savarese's experiences following the adoption of his son, DJ, who is non-speaking and autistic, from the foster care system. Savarese's wife Emily worked as an assistant director of a center for autism and related disabilities when she met DJ, who was then under three years old. By the time they adopted him, DJ had lived in several foster homes and had been abused due to his disability. Savarese and his wife Emily helped DJ recover from trauma experienced in the foster care system, then worked alongside him to find ways to help DJ communicate in a way that felt most natural to him, ultimately utilizing facilitated communication (FC).

Publishers Weekly praised Savarese for writing "with passion and humor, careful to include extensive excerpts from DJ's typing, so readers get a sense of his remarkable growth". Booklist's Donna Chavez discussed how "Savarese's careful melding of memoir and passionate advocacy for the disabled informs and inspires". Chris Gabbard, writing for Disability Studies Quarterly called the book "intelligently engaging" and "gripping reading", while highlighting how it "can be distinguished from many of the other memoirs by parents of children with learning disabilities by its lack of what disability rights activist Harriet McBryde Johnson would term 'sentimental pap.'" Library Journal's Corey Seeman provided a more critical review of the book, noting that "while Savarese shows the positive aspects of FC, he fails to demonstrate in-depth how that method could be used by parents and educators." Seeman also questioned how much input DJ had in writing parts of the book using FC. Despite these critiques, Seeman found "the elements documenting the foster care system worthwhile".

Reasonable People won the gold medal for the 2008 IPPY Award for Health/Medicine/Nutrition.

=== Papa, Ph.D. (2010) ===
Papa, PhD: Essays on Fatherhood by Men in the Academy is a collection co-edited with Mary Ruth Marotte and Paige Reynolds, which was published by Rutgers University Press in 2010.

Erin K. Anderson, writing for Men and Masculinities, found Papa, Ph.D. to be "an interesting and well-written collection of essays on fatherhood in the academy". Anderson highlighted "the authors’ candid revelations about their desires for family, for work, for themselves, and how these are realized, modified, or sacrificed highlights how men are also influenced by social norms, institutional constraints, and the interpersonal relationships of family life". Similarly, Ilya Merlin, writing for the Journal of Men, Masculinities and Spirituality, found that the book "thoroughly and compellingly complicates narratives of fatherhood, masculinity, family, and privilege". However, Anderson indicated that "while the variety of essays is intriguing, there is a significant weakness with the collection"; that is, "the majority of essays are authored by men with degrees in English and other disciplines in the humanities".

=== See It Feelingly (2018) ===
See It Feelingly: Classic Novels, Autistic Readers, and the Schooling of a No-Good English Professor was published by Duke University Press in 2018. In the book, Savarese discusses his experience teaching literature to five autistic people, including Temple Grandin and Dora Raymaker. This work aimed to counter common conceptions that autistic people "are deficient in both theory of mind ('an awareness of what is in the mind of another person') and 'the apprehension of figurative language'", both of which are required to relate to and understand literature. Savarese's literary choices focused on American classics, including Herman Melville's Moby-Dick, Leslie Marmon Silko’s Ceremony, and Philip K. Dick’s Do Androids Dream of Electric Sheep?

According to Publishers Weekly, "The book's writing style can be hard going, full of academic lingo and digressions into etymology and literary theory, but this idealistic argument for the social value of literature and for the diversity of autism as a condition is a rewarding endeavor, nevertheless, in much the same way that a hike up steep terrain can open up to a wondrous view". Similarly, Kirkus Reviews referred to See It Feelingly as "a fresh and absorbing examination of autism" that "illuminates the diversity of [autistic people's] emotional, aesthetic, and intellectual experiences; the strategies that have enabled them to articulate their thoughts and communicate (even if they are nonspeaking); and their abiding desire to be recognized as fully functioning human beings with capacities that neurotypicals cannot imagine rather than sufferers from a 'relentless pathology'". Likewise, Jennifer Marchisotto, writing for Disability Studies Quarterly, described the book as "part personal narrative, part critical engagement" and highlighted how Savarese "produces a counternarrative to the assumed limits of autistic empathy". When considering the text within an academic context, Marchisotto recommended pairing it "with a more theoretical text such as Margaret Price's Mad at School."

=== Republican Fathers (2020) ===
Republican Fathers was published by Nine Mile Art Corporation in 2020. The book explores Savarese's experience growing up in the 1970s to 1990s surrounded by many parental figures who aligned themselves with the American Republican Party, which resulted in "subsequent trauma and perplexity".

Reviewer Anna Roach highlighted the book's "sharpness, wit, and precision" as Savarese "cleverly unpacks what it meant to exist amidst the fleeting power possessed by figures like John Ehrlichman and Elliot Richardson". Roach concluded that the book provides "an astute meditation on how formative our political upbringings can be, and a demonstration of how to break free of them". On behalf of Hole in the Head, Jessica Purdy wrote, "To say this book of poetry is scathing and bitter would be an understatement". Purdy further discussed how the "epigraphs from Russian writers such as Gogol and Turgenev" provide interesting insights to the "current political climate with those works that satirized government by lampooning the evils of corrupt bureaucracy"; she noted how, in 2020, American were "living through an unprecedented election year and these poems serve to shine light on the dangers of putting our faith in those in power. And how fleeting that power is."

=== When This Is Over (2020) ===
When This Is Over: Pandemic Poems is a poetry collection published by Ice Cube Press in 2020. The poems cover topics such as Zoom calls, baking bread, and "the overwhelming grief and uncertainty that shrouded the time period", among other topics. Reviewer Anna Roach highlighted how "Savarese places his internal dialogue in conversation with national and worldwide discourse, skillfully capturing the disorientation and confusion of those formative months."

== Personal ==
Savarese and his wife Emily adopted their son, David James (DJ) Savarese, when DJ was six years old, though Emily had met DJ, who is non-speaking and autistic, when he was under three years old. DJ's adoption led Savarese to become interested in neuroscience. DJ graduated Phi Beta Kappa from Oberlin College in 2017 as the university's first non-speaking autistic student. In 2017, PBS released the documentary Deej, which depicted his life experiences, including his journey through university.

Savarese lives in Iowa City, Iowa.

== Books ==
=== As author ===
- Savarese, Ralph James (2007). Reasonable People: A Memoir of Autism and Adoption. Other Press. ISBN 978-1-59051-129-9.
- Savarese, Ralph James (2018). See It Feelingly: Classic Novels, Autistic Readers, and the Schooling of a No-Good English Professor. Duke University Press. ISBN 978-1-4780-0273-4.
- Savarese, Ralph James (2020). Republican Fathers. Nine Mile Art Corporation. ISBN 978-1-7326600-9-0.
- Savarese, Ralph J. (2020). When This Is Over: Pandemic Poems. Ice Cube Press. ISBN 978-1-948509-22-0.
- Kuusisto, Stephen; Savarese, Ralph James (2021). Someone Falls Overboard: Talking Through Poems. Nine Mile Art Corporation. ISBN 978-1-7354463-5-6.
- Benedi, Pilar Martinez; Savarese, Ralph James (2024). Herman Melville and Neurodiversity, or Why Hunt Difference with Harpoons?: A Primitivist Phenomenology. Bloomsbury Academic. ISBN 978-1-350-36086-0.

=== As editor ===
- Marotte, Mary Ruth; Reynolds, Paige; Savarese, Ralph James, eds. (2010). Papa, PhD: Essays on Fatherhood by Men in the Academy. Rutgers University Press. ISBN 9780813548784.
