= Catholic University of the West =

Private French university

Coordinates: 47°27′53″N 0°32′55″W

- Université catholique de l'Ouest (UCO)
- Catholic University of the West
- Type: Private
- Established: 1242; 784 years ago
- Founder: Mgr. Charles-Émile Freppel
- Affiliations: IDCE, French Catholic Academy, Couperin (consortium)
- Chancellor: Laurent Péridy
- Students: 13,000
- Location: Angers, France
- Campus: Urban
- Website: www.uco.fr

The Catholic University of the West (French: Université catholique de l'Ouest), also known as UCO or colloquially as la Catho, is a private higher education institution located in Angers, France.

== History ==
Early in the 11th century, the Université d'Angers was founded in Angers became famous under the direction of Marbodus, later Bishop of Rennes, and of Ulger, later Bishop of Angers, both pupils of the canonist, Fulbert de Chartres. It was enlarged in 1229 by an influx of students, many of them Englishmen, from the University of Paris, who sought in Angers a shelter from the direct control of the King of France. Angers then became a center for the study of civil law, and a "studium generale," although it was officially recognized as such by an Episcopal ordinance only in 1337. In 1364 it received from King Charles V a charter granting the same privileges as those enjoyed by the University of Orleans. It was only in 1432 that a papal bull of Pope Eugene IV added the usual colleges of Theology, Medicine and Arts to the College of Canon and Civil Law. This organization continued until the French Revolution.

After the National Assembly had granted to all freedom of teaching, the French bishops decided to found five Catholic universities, and Angers, due to Bishop Charles Émile Freppel, was chosen for the western portion of France, including the Dioceses of Angers, Rennes, Laval, Le Mans, Angoulême, Tours and Poitiers. The institution then took the title of "Facultés Catholiques de l'Ouest."

The main campus is situated in the city of Angers and hosts more than 7,000 students. Catholic University of the West has international partnerships with more than 75 universities in the world. Starting from 2009, the institution is trying to maintain international partnerships and agreements with universities around the world.

== Timeline ==
- 1875: The Catholic University of Angers was re-founded by Freppel. The College of Law, inaugurated at Cathedral St. Maurice on November 15, was the first of its kind in France. The other colleges reopened in the following years: Literature (1876), Sciences (1877) and Theology (1879).
- 1879: The institution was organized according to the catholic canon as a Catholic University by Pope Pius IX.
- 1898: The School of Agriculture and Viticulture, predecessor of the current Superior School of Agriculture (ESA), was founded by Ernest Vétillart
- October 1909: The School of Commercial Sciences (ESSCA) was created.
- 1947: The Foreign Center for French Language and Civilization Studies was founded.
- 1950: The Technical School of Chemistry (ETSCO) was founded.
- 1956: The School of Electronics of the West (ESEO) was created.
- October 22, 1993: The ceremonial first brick was laid for the new buildings of the institution.
- 2002: Robert Rousseau was appointed the Rector of the institution.
- 1 January 2008: Guy Bedouelle became Rector of the institution. Bedouelle, was known for his work in literature and theology, and served the Catholic Church as juror, international historian, council member and teacher.
- 1 September 2012: Dominique Vermersch, an economist, became Rector of the institution.

== Location ==
The institution is located on nine campuses:

Campuses
Campus	Students	Disciplines
Angers	7,390	21
IFEPSA (Physical education and sports), Angers	930	5
Guingamp, Brittany	1,000	20
Laval - Superior Institute of Trades	320	5
Vannes on the Arradon River in the region of Morbihan	900	14
Nantes	800	7
Niort	30	6
Saint-Denis, Réunion	440	4
Papeete, French Polynesia	380	5

== Organization ==
The Institution is organised into six Faculties:

- Law, Economics, Management and Political science
- Education
- Humanities
- Science
- Social and Human Science
- Theology and Religious Studies

The Centre International d'Études Françaises, located at the Angers campus, provides dedicated instruction in the French language.

In 1990, under the authority of l'Université Catholique d'Angers, the Catholic Institute of Higher Studies - ICES was opened in La Roche-sur-Yon. After three years of collaboration, the Superior Council of the Catholic University of the West awarded ICES its academic independence in 1993. François Garnier, Bishop of Luçon, became the institutional head of the establishment with the responsibility of maintaining its ecclesiastical membership. The Institute is also called the Catholic University of the Vendée.

L'Université Catholique d'Angers is a member of the International Federation of Catholic Universities.

== Notable people ==
=== Faculty ===
- Louis Billot (1846, in Sierck-les-Bains, Moselle – 1931) - Jesuit priest and theologian
- René Bazin (1853, in Angers – 1932) - lawyer and novelist
- Maurice Couette (1858, Tours – 1943, Angers) - physicist known for his studies of fluidity
- Pierre Fauvel (1866, in Cherbourg – 1958, in Angers) - zoologist, who specialised in the study of polychaetes
- Maurice de la Taille (1872-1933) - Catholic priest whose writings influenced the Liturgical Movement
- Robert Corillion (1908, in Hanvec-1997) - botanist
- René Laurentin (1917-2017) - theologian
- Germain Marc'hadour (1921, in Langonnet – 2022) - Catholic priest, professor of English, founder of the journal Moreana
- Janine Brouard (born 1941, in Clohars-Carnoët) - sociologist and ethnologist
- Pierre Grandet - (born 1954) - egyptologist
- Fred Poché (born 1960) - philosopher
- Joseph Gelfer (born 1974, in Southampton) - British researcher; specialist in masculinity
- Constantin Xypas (born 1947, in Cairo) - education

=== Alumni ===
- Alexis-Armand Charost (1860 – 1930) - cardinal of the Roman Catholic Church, Archbishop of Rennes
- Léon Gry (born 1879, in Rennes - 1952) - theologian
- Louis-Marie Billé (1938, in Fleury-les-Aubrais -2002) - Archbishop of Lyon, President of the French Council of Bishops
- Léon Jozeau-Marigné (born 1909, in Angers - 2003) - politician
- Paul Poupard (born 1930, in Bouzillé, Maine-et-Loire) - Cardinal of the Catholic Church
- Joël Mercier (born 1945, in Chaudefonds-sur-Layon) - prelate of the Roman Catholic Church
- Nora Barry Fischer (born 1951, in Homestead, Pennsylvania) - Senior United States District Judge
- Dominique-Marie David (born 1963) - prelate of the Catholic Church, Archbishop of Monaco
- Susanne Koelbl, class of 1985 at CIDEF, German journalist, lecturer and international correspondent for Der Spiegel, Liberty Award in 2014.
- Victoria, Crown Princess of Sweden, class of 1996-1997 at CIDEF, and class of 1997-1998 of UCO.
- Akihiko Nishio, class of 1982 at CIDEF, Vice President, Development Finance at the World Bank.
- Tess Gunty, class of 2012-2013 at CIDEF, Novelist, National Book Award Prize - fiction (2022).
- Boris Pistorius, class of 1983 at CIDEF, Federal Minister of Defense (Germany), previously the Minister of the Interior and Sports of the Land of Lower Saxony and Mayor of Osnabrück.
- Rabbin Moshe Sebbag, class of 2001 at CIDEF, Rabbin de la Grande Synagogue de Paris (rue de la Victoire).
- Patricia Stokes, class of 1977 at CIDEF, Vice President of Strategy and Integration, Bank of America.

== See also ==
- Université d'Angers
