= Angers (meteorite) =

Meteorite that fell in June 1822 in France

- Type: Chondrite
- Class: Ordinary chondrite
- Group: L6
- Country: France
- Region: Pays de la Loire
- Coordinates: 47°22′N 0°33′W
- Observed fall: Yes
- Fall date: 3 June 1822

Angers is an ordinary chondrite meteorite that fell in Pays de la Loire, France, at 8:15 PM on 3 June 1822. The meteorite has since been stored at the Muséum d'histoire naturelle d'Angers, a French natural history museum, alongside the L'Aigle meteorite which struck France 19 years earlier, on 26 April 1803.

== See also ==
- Glossary of meteoritics
