= IDCE Business School =

Catholic university in Angers, France

- Institut pour le Développement du Conseil et de l'Entreprise
- Type: Private Business School
- Established: 1978
- Affiliations: Catholic University of the West
- Academic staff: Economics
- Location: 3 Place André Leroy BP10808 49008 ANGERS CEDEX 01, Angers, France
- Campus: Urban
- Website: http://www.idce.com

IDCE Business School (Institute for the Development of Consulting and Enterprise, Institut pour le Développement du Conseil et de l'Entreprise) is a college and graduate school located in Angers, France. It is the business school of the Catholic University of the West, one of the most prestigious French schools.

== History ==
The IDCE was created in 1987 with the help of the General Council of the Maine-et-Loire and the Economical Development Committee of the Maine-et-Loire. It is specialized in Economics and Business Management.

== Organization ==
The institute offers graduate and undergraduate degrees:

Graduate degrees

- The Certificate of management consulting, in French, in Angers
- The MBA in Consulting, in English, in Angers
- The MBA in International Business, in English, in Angers

Undergraduate degrees

- Licence en Economie, Gestion et Ethique de l'Entreprise, in French, in Angers
- The BBA in International Business, in English, in Angers
- The option: Dual BBA Degree with a major in European Business (St. Edward's University, Austin, Texas, USA and IDCE, UCO)
