= Catholic University of the West Pacific =

Private university in French Polynesia

Coordinates: 17.5459°S 149.5563°W

Catholic University of the West at Papeete
- I Papeete, te fare haapiiraa tuatoru Katolika no te pae Tooa o te râ (Tahitian)
- Logotype of the university.
- Other names: UCO Pacific
- Former names: ISEPP
- Motto: Humanité, Proximité, Dialogue et Liberté
- Motto in English: Humanity, Proximity, Dialogue and Freedom
- Type: Private university
- Established: 1995 (31 years ago)
- Affiliations: Catholic University of the West
- Chairman: Guillaume Mariani
- Academic staff: 2,455 (FTE, 2023)
- Administrative staff: 100
- Students: 430
- Location: Papeete, French Polynesia, France
- Campus: Tearaora Campus; Urban
- Colours: Yellow and Grey
- Website: papeete.uco.fr

The Catholic University of the West – Pacific (in French: Université Catholique de l'Ouest – Pacifique, UCO Pacifique), or the Catholic University of the West at Papeete, formerly the Institut supérieur de l'enseignement privé de Polynésie française (ISEPP), is a private university located in Papeete, French Polynesia. Founded in 1999, the college is part of the Catholic University of the West network, based in Angers.

== History ==
Created in 1999, the Institut Supérieur de l'Enseignement Privé de Polynésie Française (ISEPP) initially set out to provide priority education for teachers in the private sector, by offering a Bachelor of Education, followed by a DEUG in Psychology.

Encouraged by the success of this experiment and the numerous requests for university training, the ISEPP team has set up two courses open to the general public: a Bachelor (Licence) of Information and Communication and a Bachelor (Licence) of Psychology.

The university continues to specialise in these two fields, while at the same time continuing its work to build and disseminate knowledge in the social sciences and humanities.

Since 2007, a Bachelor of Sociology and Ethnology-Anthropology, and a Master of Education have joined the other courses.

For the start of the 2009 academic year, three professional university degrees in Language and Asia-Pacific Interculturality will be offered at ISEPP, then at UCO Pacifique.

== Organization ==
The Catholic University of the West at Papeete is attached to the Direction of Catholic Education in Polynesia (DEC), which guarantees its specific character, and is a campus of the Catholic University of the West.

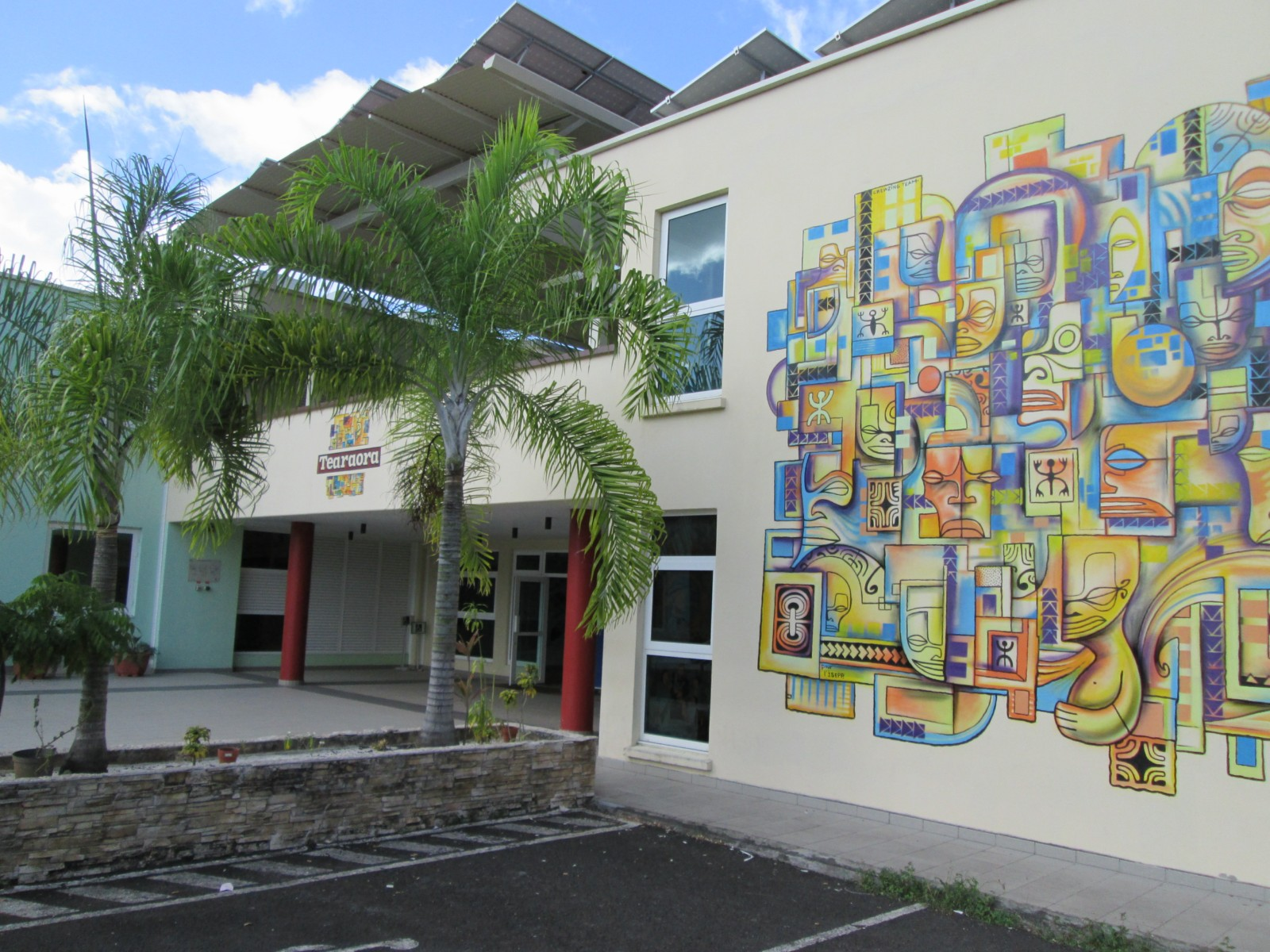
Entrance hall of the university.

With its 200 students, its facilities (200-seat amphitheatre, computer labs, university library) and its team of 7 permanent academic staff and some 70 part-time staff, the Catholic University of the West at Papeete has become a research centre with its place in French Polynesia.

== The UCO programs in Papeete ==
Departments	Bachelor (Licence)			Master		DU
Psychology	Available	Available	Available			
Mass Communication	Available	Available	Available	No longer available		
Education			Available			
Training Design					No longer available	
Sociologie-Ethnologie			Available			
Theology						Available
Management and Interculturality						Available
LICAP						Available
Banking and Insurance			Available			
Environment			Planned			
