= L'Aigle (meteorite) =

Meteorite that fell in Normandy, France in April 1803

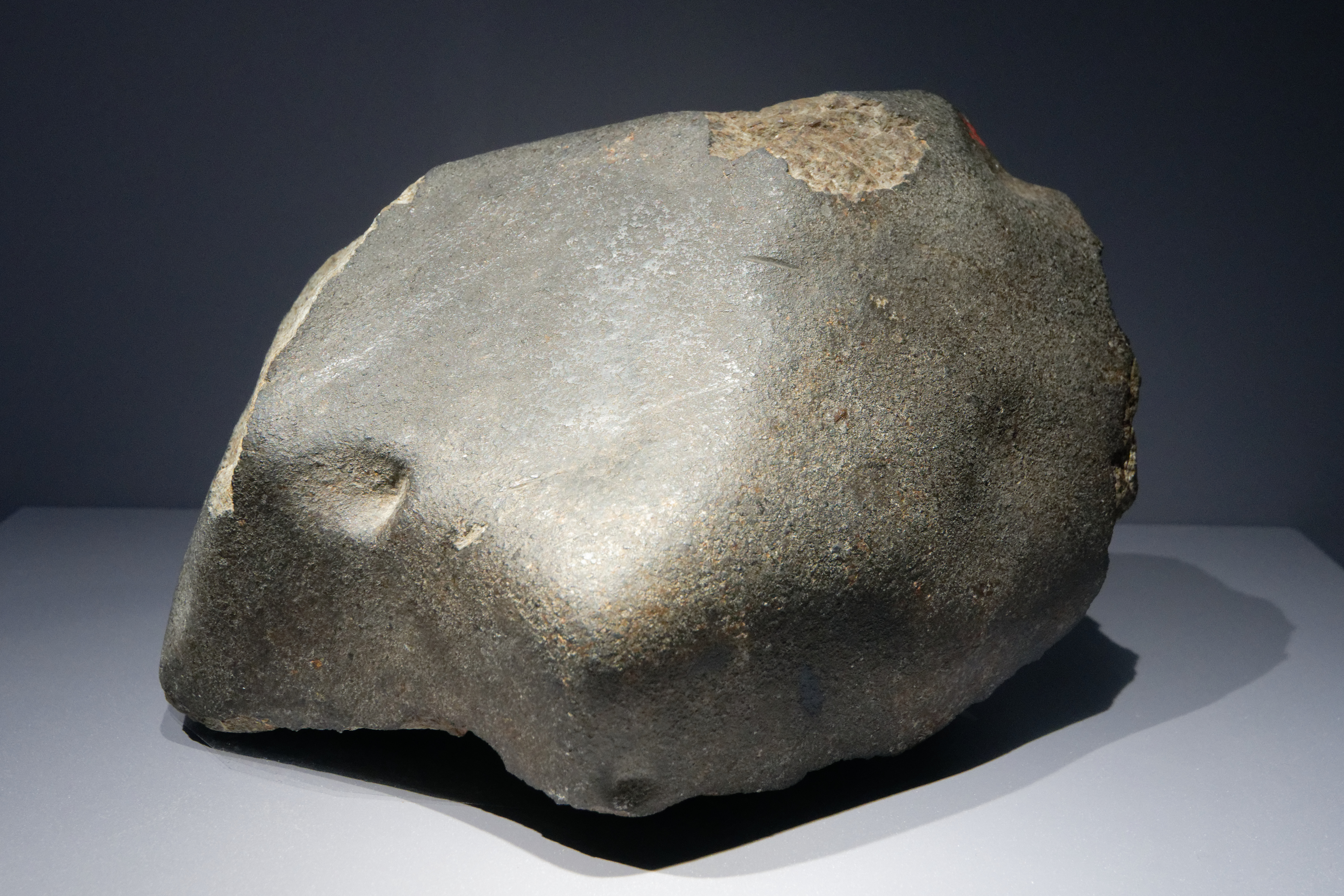
- Fragment of the L'Aigle meteorite
- Type: Chondrite
- Class: Ordinary chondrite
- Group: L6
- Country: France
- Region: Normandy
- Coordinates: 48°48′N 0°36′E
- Observed fall: Yes
- Fall date: 26 April 1803
- TKW: 37 kg (82 lb)
- Strewn field: Yes
- Related media on Wikimedia Commons

L'Aigle is a meteorite that fell on 26 April 1803 over L'Aigle, Lower Normandy, France, during a meteor shower. Before the event, meteorites were generally considered a superstition and were mistrusted by the scientific community. Ernst Chladni had theorised and published a book in 1794 saying that meteorites originated beyond Earth. Although some other meteor showers occurred, none sparked significant interest in investigating their origins until the L'Aigle event.

== History ==
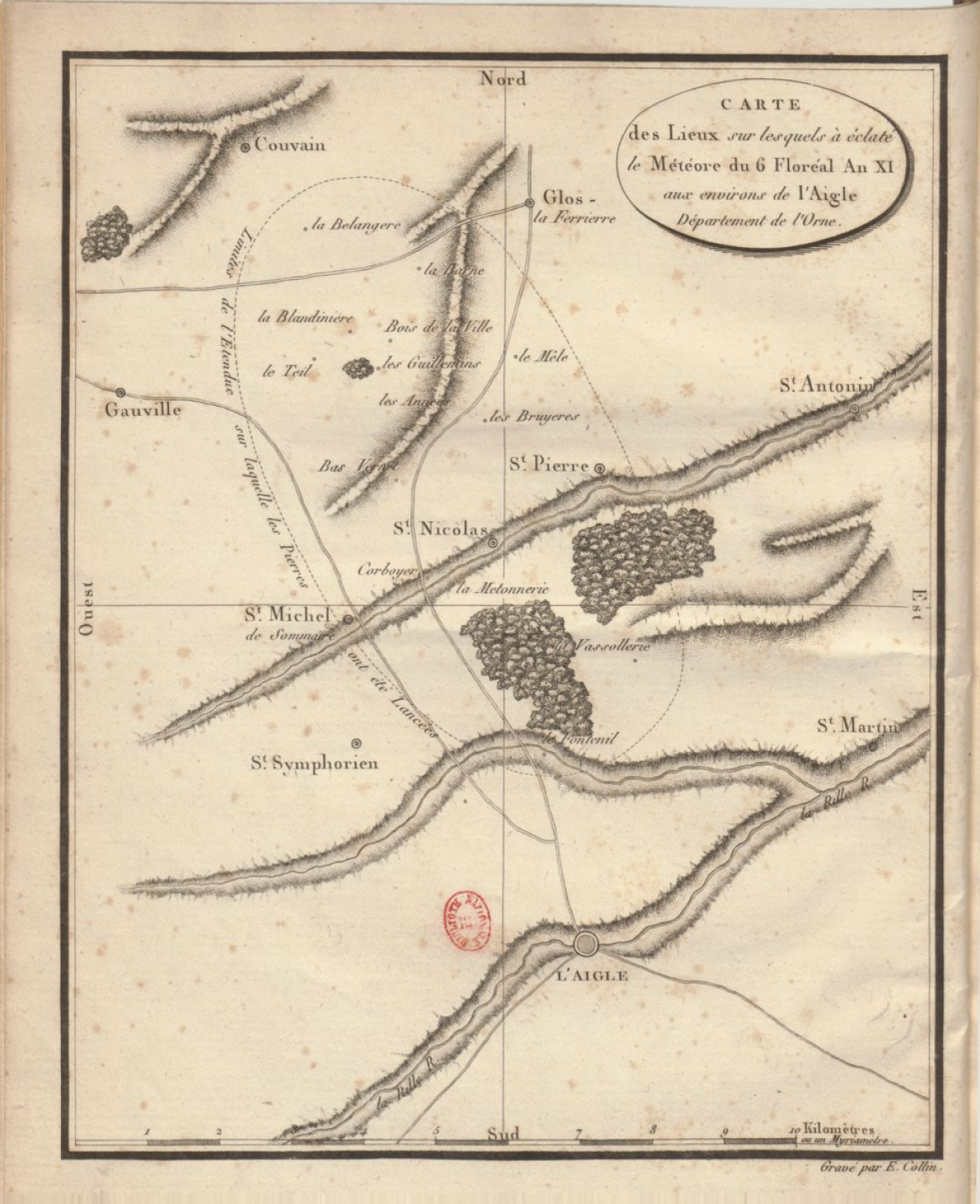
Representation of the stray field in the report by Jean-Baptiste Biot

In the early afternoon of 26 April 1803, a meteorite shower of more than 3000 fragments fell upon the town of L'Aigle in Normandy, France. Upon hearing of this event, the French Academy of Sciences sent the young scientist Jean-Baptiste Biot to investigate. After painstaking work in the field, he reported two kinds of evidence pointing to an extraterrestrial origin for the stones:

1. Physical evidence: the sudden appearance of many identical stones similar to other stones fallen from the sky in other places
2. Witness testimony: many witnesses who observed a "rain of stones thrown by the meteor"

Biot's paper describing how these stones must undoubtedly be of extraterrestrial origin effectively gave birth to the science of meteoritics.

The L'Aigle event was a milestone in the understanding of meteorites and their origins because at that time the mere existence of meteorites was harshly debated and not assumed extraterrestrial. If they were recognised, their origin was controversial, with most commentators agreeing with the meteorology treatise by Aristotle. He argued that the Sun's heat generated two types of vapours on the Earth's surface, one hot and dry and the other cold and moist, that soar to the atmosphere and formed clouds that, under the right conditions, would ignite and produce meteors, implying that their origin was terrestrial. These ideas were accepted by the scientific community and were not questioned, while witness reports of meteorite falls were treated with great scepticism.

The meteorite has since been stored at the Muséum d'histoire naturelle d'Angers, a French natural history museum, alongside the Angers meteorite which struck France 19 years later, on 3 June 1822.

== Composition and classification ==
It is an L6 type ordinary chondrite.

== See also ==
- Glossary of meteoritics
