= Susanne Koelbl =

German journalist

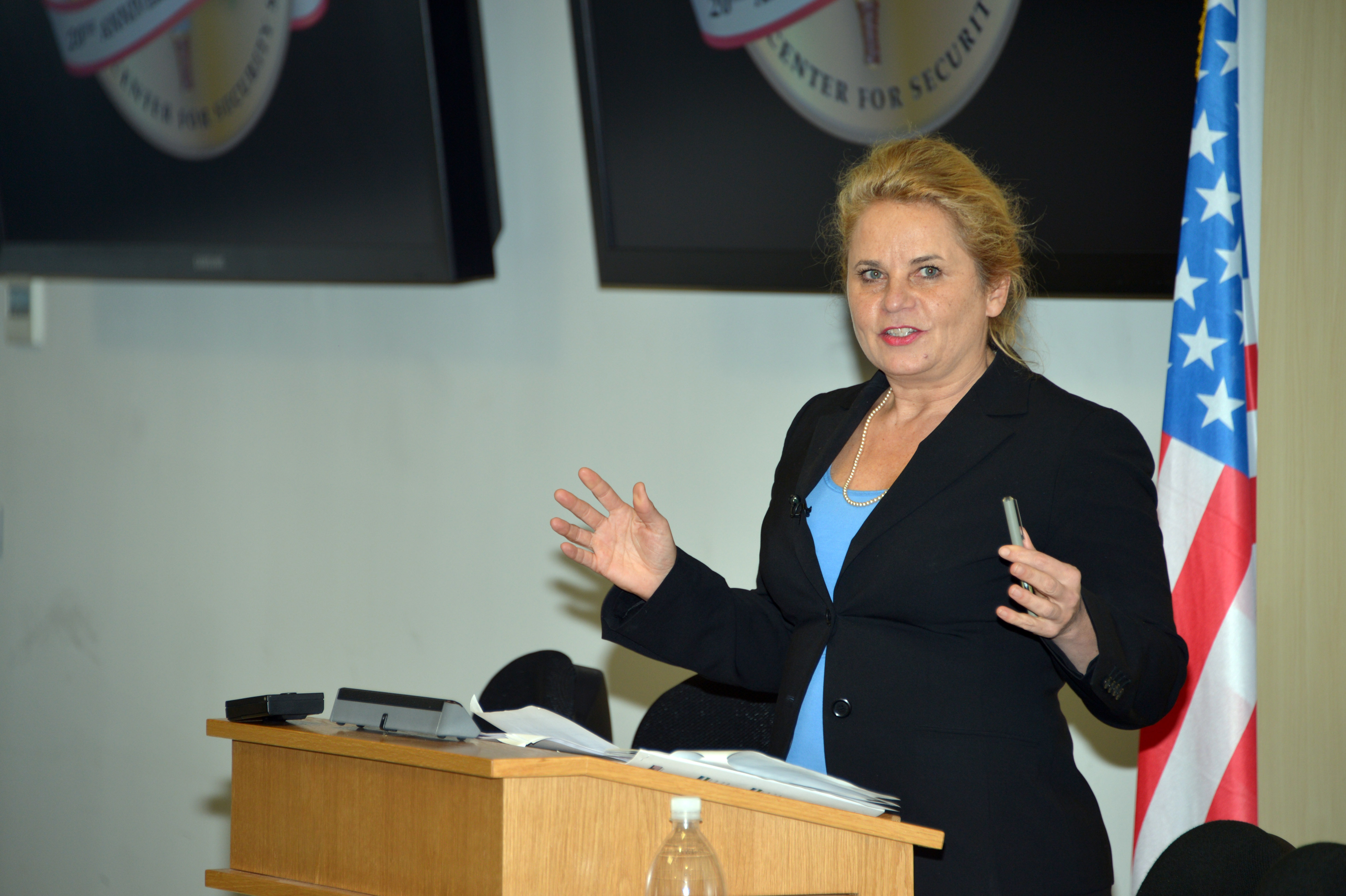
Koelbl during Security Sector Capacity Building program in Germany in 2019.

Susanne Koelbl is a German journalist, lecturer and foreign correspondent.

Koelbl has reported from war zones and crisis centers in the Balkans, the Middle East, South Asia and Northern Asia.

== Life ==
Susanne Koelbl was born in Munich as the daughter of the photographer and documentary filmmaker Herlinde Koelbl. After graduating from the Bertolt-Brecht-Gymnasium (BBG) in Munich-Pasing, Koelbl studied languages at the Université Catholique de l'Ouest (UCO) in Angers in France and politics and history at LMU Munich. Koelbl did her journalistic training in Munich. She volunteered at the evening newspaper, for which she then worked as an editor and then went to SZ-Magazin as an author and co-founder.

In 1991, she switched to Spiegel in Hamburg and reported from war and crisis regions from the end of the 1990s, including from the former Yugoslavia, Afghanistan, Pakistan, Iraq, Iran, Syria, and North Korea. She also conducted several interviews with heads of state and government, including Syrian President Bashar al-Assad, Sudanese President Umar al-Bashir, former Presidents Hamid Karzai (Afghanistan), Pervez Musharraf and Asif Ali Zardari (Pakistan) and Prime Minister Haider al-Abadi (Iraq).

In April 2008, it became known that the Federal Intelligence Service was monitoring Afghan Trade and Industry Minister Amin Farhang in 2006 and had also recorded e-mails from Koelbl.

On a Knight Wallace Fellowship, she studied at the University of Michigan at Ann Arbor in the United States of America. During a sabbatical, she worked on a study on Syria in 2011/12 and gave guest lectures on the war in Afghanistan. Koelbl is also a fellow of the German-French Youth Office (DFJW) and a fellow of the German-Israeli Young Leaders Exchange of the Bertelsmann Foundation. In 2011, she spent three months in Beijing, China, as the China-Germany media ambassador for the Robert Bosch Foundation.

She was also a lecturer in the journalism department at the Institute for Communication and Media Studies at the University of Leipzig.

== Awards ==
In 2014, she won the Liberty Award for her reports on the civil war in Syria and North Korea.

== Writings ==
- Susanne Koelbl, Olaf Ihlau : War in the Hindu Kush: People and Powers in Afghanistan. Random House, Pantheon Verlag, Munich 2009, ISBN 978-3-570-55075-5.
- Susanne Koelbl, Olaf Ihlau: Beloved, dark country. People and powers in Afghanistan. Siedler Verlag, Munich 2007, ISBN 978-3-88680-878-6.
- Susanne Koelbl: 12 weeks in Riyadh. Saudi Arabia between dictatorship and new beginnings. Deutsche-Verlags-Anstalt, Munich 2019, ISBN 978-3-421-04786-1.
- Behind the Kingdom's Veil: Inside the New Saudi Arabia Under Crown Prince Mohammed bin Salman.
