= Joseph Gelfer =

British author and academic (born 1974)

- Born: 1974 (age 51–52); Southampton, England
- Education: BA Hons, University of Bristol, PhD, Victoria University, New Zealand
- Occupations: Researcher in religion and masculinities, academic editor and coach
- Notable work: Numen, Old Men: Contemporary Masculine Spiritualities and the Problem of Patriarchy, 2012: Decoding the Countercultural Apocalypse

Joseph Gelfer (born 1974) is a British author and academic who analyses spirituality, religion and masculinity. His book 2012: Decoding the Countercultural Apocalypse (which brought together scholarly analyses of the end of the world phenomenon from anthropology, Mayan studies, religious studies and cultural studies) attracted considerable media attention. He founded and edits Journal of Men, Masculinities and Spirituality, created the Future Masculinity online course and styles himself Director of Masculinity Research.

== Early life and education ==
Gelfer was born in 1974 in Southampton, England.

He has a BA Hons from University of Bristol and a doctorate in religious studies from Victoria University of Wellington (2008). His thesis was titled Numen, Old Men: contemporary masculine spiritualities and the problem of patriarchy.

== Academic research and professional positions ==
Joseph Gelfer is a lecturer and tutor at Université Catholique de l'Ouest. He has had concurrent careers in research in religion and masculinities and in academic editing and coaching. He has held positions as Adjunct Research Associate at the School of Political and Social Inquiry at Monash University, Honorary Research Associate at University of Divinity, Melbourne, as editorial specialist at the Royal Melbourne Institute of Technology (RMIT) and an assistant editor at the University of London.

== 2012: Decoding the Countercultural Apocalypse ==
Leading up to and during 2012 Gelfer received media attention for his book, 2012: Decoding the Countercultural Apocalypse, which brought together scholarly analyses of the end of the world phenomenon from anthropology, Mayan studies, religious studies and cultural studies. It examines the "merits and demerits of cultural appropriation" and "the lack of consensus between different scholars and the inconsistent goals of different disciplines". He aimed "to strike some balance between visionary and critical thinking" and he was criticised by members from the skeptical, catastrophist, conspiracy and spiritually inclined communities for his non-partisan views. His proposition from the book's analysis was that no physical event would occur but "that people [would] realise the changes they dearly wish to see in the world will not come from some cosmic source, but rather instead political agency and social activism. And that, ironically, may result in 2012 being a catalyst for a shift in human consciousness, exactly as the prophets predicted."

== Other writing ==
Gelfer has been active in social commentary. publishing articles about topics such as psychedelic substances within a spiritual context, the commercialisation of spiritualities, child discipline, open access publishing and teetotalism. He has also published a number of travel articles and a book of Latrinalia called The Little Book of Toilet Graffiti (which according to Gelfer was simply a fund raising exercise and was followed by The Little Book of Student Bollocks and The Little Book of Office Bollocks).

== Five Stages of Masculinity ==
The Five Stages of Masculinity is a model used to view a person's understandings of masculinity. This model is the basis of the Masculinity Research organisation directed by Joseph Gelfer which offers "insight into men and masculinity in three key areas: Market research for products and services, Social research for non-profit and governmental policymakers [and] People and culture development for businesses and organizations".

== InformitTV interviews ==
In 2012 Gelfer undertook a number of interviews on a variety of topics published through InformitTV.

- Lynette Russell and Joseph Gelfer discuss the challenges faced by Indigenous Australians. Professor Lynette Russell is Director of Monash Indigenous Centre, Monash University. Professor Russell specialises in anthropological and Indigenous history.
- Marcus Powe and Joseph Gelfer discuss the entrepreneurial spirit. Marcus Powe is an entrepreneurship and business coaching specialist who is the Entrepreneur in Residence at RMIT University
- Jenny Smith and Joseph Gelfer discuss homelessness in Australia. Jenny Smith is the chief executive officer, Council to Homeless Persons in Victoria.
- Sophie Cunningham and Joseph Gelfer discuss Australian literature. Sophie Cunningham is a Melbourne-based writer and editor.
- Joseph Gelfer and Christopher Fairley discuss sexual health. Christopher Fairley is Director of the Melbourne Sexual Health Centre and Professor of Public Health at Monash University.

== Books ==
- Numen, Old Men: Contemporary Masculine Spiritualities and the Problem of Patriarchy (Equinox Publishers, 2009)
- The Best of Journal of Men, Masculinities and Spirituality (Gorgias Press, 2010)
- The Masculinity Conspiracy (Online, 2010). This is a free ebook.
- 2012: Decoding the Countercultural Apocalypse (Equinox Publishers, 2011)
- Masculinities in a Global Era (Springer, 2013)

== Articles ==
- "Changing Masculinity: Three Subtle Mistakes." The Good Men Project, February 2015.
- "Masculinity, Terrorism and Charlie Hebdo." The Good Men Project, January 2015.
- "Changing Masculinity: It’s Time to Pivot." The Good Men Project, January 2015.
- "Why Won’t Australia Run Medical Trials of MDMA?" Vice, April 2014.
- "After the 2012 Not-Apocalypse." Vice, January 2014.
- "GenerationX-Men." Disinfo, August 2013.
- "Smacks of Denial." Online Opinion, August 2013.
- "Teetotal Consciousness Shift." The Good Men Project, May 2013.
- "The Other Apocalypses." The Skeptic, September 2012.
- "The Way Men Are." VoiceMale, Fall 2012.
- "A Cynic in a Sweat Lodge." Travel Mag, May 2012.
- "Gender, Sexuality and Psychedelic Spirituality." Elephant Journal, April 2012.
- "Occupy Porosity." OnlineOpinion, April 2012.
- "2012 and Indigenous Fantasy." Fortean Times, February 2012.
- "Interview with Joseph Gelfer on 2012." Sacred Tribes Journal, February 2012.
- "2012: Between Critical and Visionary Thinking." Reality Sandwich, January 2012.
- "2012 Cometh: How to Prepare for the Apocalypse." The Conversation, January 2012.
- "Towards a Sacramental Understanding of Dextromethorphan: A Research Story.” Entheogenesis Australis Journal (2010).
- “The Masculinity Conspiracy." OnlineOpinion, May 2010.
- "Both Remedy and Poison: Religious Men and the Future of Peace." Journal of Men, Masculinities and Spirituality 4, no. 1 (2010): 1–5.
- "Open Access Economics." Journal of Men, Masculinities and Spirituality 3, no. 2 (2009): 97–99.
- "Pray Like a Man." The Guardian, March 2009 (reprinted in E-Journal of Solidarity, Sustainability, and Nonviolence 5, no. 5 (2009).
- "Menergy: Men’s Ministries and the New Masculinity." Religion Dispatches, May 2008.
- "Turn On, Log In, Log Out." Religious Studies News, October 2006.
- "Smacks of Denial." Scoop, August 2006.
- "An Interview with Matthew Fox." Ashé, Summer 2006.
- "I Remember Adlestrop." Perceptive Travel, March/April 2006.
- "Otago, Invercargill & Stewart Island (update)." Fodors New Zealand 2006, edited by Jennifer Paull. New York: Fodors, 2006, pp. 409–437.
- “H2Odyssey: The Human-Dolphin-Spirit Connection.” Rainbow News, December 2005.
- “Review of ‘A New Reformation’ by Matthew Fox.” Ashé, Summer 2005.
- “Climbing the Old Man: The Vanuatu Volcano." Pology Magazine, 2005.
- "Review of 'The Miracle Detective' by Randall Sullivan." Ashé, Summer 2004.
- "The Dreaming Project." Rainbow News, June 2004.
- "New Catholics." The Tablet, March 2004.
- "The Brits Abroad and the Philosophy of Holiday Hedonism." Exquisite Corpse, Winter 2003.
- "Who'll Raise a Pint to the Future of Religion?" Spirituality & Health, Winter 2003.
- "Review of 'The Sun at Midnight' by Laurence Galian." Ashé, Winter 2003.
- "The Rugby Bible." Rugby World, November 2003.
- "Healed by Hévíz." Fate Magazine, October 2003.
- "Rumi Nation." Conscious Living, Autumn 2003.
- "Radical Breaking News: The Surfer’s Bible.” Spirituality & Health, April 2003.
- “Visiting a Celtic Christian Community.” Spirituality & Health, Summer 2002.
- “Anarchy in the PRC." Exquisite Corpse, Spring/Summer 2002.
- "Vanuatu Kaval Kool." Pilot Guides, Spring 2002.

=== Academic journals ===
- "Meat and Masculinity in Men’s Ministries." The Journal of Men's Studies 21, no. 1 (2013): 78–91.
- "Will the Real Joseph Gelfer Please Stand Up: Multiple Masculinities and the Self." NORMA: Nordic Journal for Masculinity Studies 7, no. 2 (2012): 125–138.
- “Entheogenic Spirituality and Gender in Australia." Paranthropology 3, no. 3 (2012): 22–33.
- "That’s Not How We Do Things Here: American Men’s Ministries in an Australasian Context." CrossCurrents 61, no. 4 (2011): 455–466.
- "Lohas and the Indigo Dollar: Growing the Spiritual Economy." New Proposals: Journal of Marxism and Interdisciplinary Inquiry 4, no. 1 (2010): 48–60.
- “Evangelical and Catholic Masculinities in Two Fatherhood Ministries." Feminist Theology 19, no. 1 (2010): 36–53.
- "Identifying the Catholic Men’s Movement." The Journal of Men's Studies 16, no. 1 (2008): 41–56.
- "Towards a Sacramental Understanding of Dextromethorphan." Journal of Alternative Spiritualities and New Age Studies 3 (2007): 80–96.

=== Book chapters ===
- "Integral Spirituality or Masculine Spirituality?" In Integral Voices on Sex, Gender, and Sexuality edited by Sarah Nicholson and Vanessa Fisher. Albany, NY: SUNY Press, 2014.
- “Introduction” and “In a Prophetic Voice: Australasia 2012.” In 2012: Decoding the Countercultural Apocalypse, edited by Joseph Gelfer. London: Equinox Publishing, 2011, pp. 1–7, 144–162.
- “A River Runs Through It: Queer Theory and Fatherhood.” In Papa, PhD: Essays on Fatherhood by Men in the Academy, edited by Mary Ruth Marotte and Paige Martin Reynolds. New Brunswick, NJ: Rutgers University Press, 2011, pp. 46–50.
- “Introduction.” In The Best of Journal of Men, Masculinities and Spirituality, edited by Joseph Gelfer. Piscataway, NJ: Gorgias Press, 2010, pp. 11–16.
- “Beyond a Sense of Place.” In Immigrant Academics and Cultural Challenges in a Global Environment, edited by Femi J. Kolapo. Youngstown, NY: Cambria Press, 2009, pp. 263–267.

=== Encyclopedia entries ===
- “Focus on the Family” and “Million Man March.” In Religion and Politics in America, edited by Philip C. DiMare. Santa Barbara, CA: ABC Clio (forthcoming).
- “Sisters of Mercy” and “Sisters of Charity.” In Encyclopedia of American Women’s History, edited by Hasia Diner. New York: Facts on File (forthcoming).
- “Sisters of Perpetual Indulgence.” In Encyclopedia of Gay Folklife, edited by Mickey Weems. Armonk NY: M.E. Sharpe (forthcoming).
- “Native American Church,” “Peyote Cult,” and “Roma.” In Encyclopedia of Immigration, Migration, & Nativism in American History, edited by James S. Olson and Bradley A. Olson. New York: Facts on File (2010).
- “Men and Boys Drinking.” In Alcohol in Popular Culture: An Encyclopedia, edited by Rachel E. Black. Westport, CT: Greenwood Press, 2010, pp. 131–133.
- “Branch Davidians,” “Robert Pirsig” and “Psychedelia.” In American Countercultures: An Encyclopedia of Nonconformists, Alternative Lifestyles, and Radical Ideas in US History, edited by Gina Misiroglu. Armonk NY: M.E. Sharpe, 2009.
- “Androgyny” and “World Magazine.” In Culture Wars: An Encyclopedia of Issues, Viewpoints, and Voices, edited by Roger Chapman. Armonk NY: M.E. Sharpe, 2009, pp. 24–25; 624–625.
- “Buddhists and Buddhism” and “Mormons”. In LGBTQ America Today, edited by John Hawley. Westport, CT: Greenwood Press, 2008, pp. 170–171; 762–763.
- “Low riders,” “Ernesto Galarza,” and “Fray Junípero Serra.” In The US-Mexico Border: An Encyclopedia of Culture and Politics, edited by Andrew G. Wood. Westport, CT: Greenwood Press, 2008, pp. 107–08; 141–43; 248–50.
- “Playboys.” In International Encyclopedia of Men and Masculinities, edited by Michael Flood, Judith K. Gardiner, Bob Pease & Keith Pringle. London: Routledge, 2007, p. 483.

=== Reviews ===
- “Review of The Making of Manhood Among Swedish Missionaries in China and Mongolia, c.1890–c.1914 and Christian Masculinity: Men and Religion in Northern Europe in the 19th and 20th Centuries." Journal of Men, Masculinities and Spirituality 6, no. 1 (2012): 41–42.
- "Review of ‘Men and Masculinities in Christianity and Judaism: A Critical Reader' edited by Bjorn Krondorfer." Journal of Men, Masculinities and Spirituality 4, no. 1 (2010): 41–42.
- "Review of ‘The Good Men Project: Real Stories from the Front Lines of Modern Manhood' edited by James Houghton, Larry Bean & Tom Matlack." Journal of Men, Masculinities and Spirituality 4, no. 1 (2010): 32–33.
- "Review of ‘The Hidden Spirituality of Men: Ten Metaphors to Awaken the Sacred Masculine' by Matthew Fox." Journal of Men, Masculinities and Spirituality 3, no. 1 (2009): 94–96.
- "Review of 'A Psychonaut's Guide to the Invisible Landscape: The Topography of the Psychedelic Experience’ by Dan Carpenter.” International Journal of Drug Policy 18, no. 3 (2007): 240.
- “Review of ‘From Boys to Men: Spiritual Rites of Passage in an Indulgent Age’ by Bret Stephenson.” Journal of Men, Masculinities and Spirituality 1, no. 1 (2007): 99–100.
- “Review of ‘No More Christian Nice Guy' by Paul Coughlin." Journal of Men's Studies 14, no. 2 (2006): 259–60.
