= Maurice de la Taille =

French Catholic priest and author (1872–1933)

Maurice de La Taille SJ (30 November 1872 – 23 October 1933) was a French Roman Catholic priest whose writings influenced the Liturgical Movement. He entered the Jesuit order in 1890 and taught theology at the Catholic University of the West in Angers. From 1916 to 1918 he was military chaplain to the Canadian Army. From 1919 he taught at the Pontifical Gregorian University.

His principal work, Mysterium Fidei, written in 1921, was a comprehensive study of the Mass. Dealing with the sacrifice once offered by Christ, he describes the Mass as the Sacrifice of the Church and the Eucharist as a Sacrament. His contention was that there is a unity between Christ's sacrifice begun at the Last Supper, consummated on the Cross and Resurrection and continued in the Mass. There was only one immolation, that at Calvary, to which the supper looked forward and the Mass looks back. He defended himself against his critics in The Mystery of Faith and Human Opinion (1930).

== Published works ==
- The Mystery of Faith: Regarding The Most August Sacrament And Sacrifice Of The Body And Blood Of Christ (1921) (Mysterium Fidei)
