= Centre International d'Études Françaises =

French language and culture program

Le Centre International d'Études Françaises (French for "International Center for French Studies), also known as CIDEF, is an academic program of the Catholic University of the West in Angers, France that offers French language and culture courses to foreign students. The institute's current director is Florence Plessis.

== Course offerings ==
CIDEF offers two semesters, October–February and February–June. Students at CIDEF take around 18 hours of courses a week. The core course at CIDEF is a "langue" (language) course, which may meet from 6 to 12 hours a week. Other courses may be taken as electives. Incoming students are given a placement test which determines the level of study they will be placed into. Students at higher levels take fewer hours of language, and more electives. Examples of recent electives include business French, phonetics, grammar, English/French translation, art history, history of music, French literature, French history, oral expression, written expression, theology, philosophy, theater, and choir.

As for Summer courses, CIDEF offers three summer sessions, in July, August and September. The summer sessions offer more language study at the expense of fewer electives.

== Student body ==
Both the size and composition of the student body vary from semester to semester, however, CIDEF generally has 200–300 students at any one time. The student body of CIDEF is diverse, reflecting global demands for French language instruction. Mostly the nations of Japan, Taiwan, China, and the United States are the most heavily represented with Japan having the most students of all. Several American universities have exchange agreements with CIDEF through which their students may study at CIDEF, including the University of Notre Dame and Louisiana state universities and private colleges affiliated with CODOFIL (Council for the Development of French In Louisiana). CODOFIL awards scholarships for French language study at a number of educational institutions, including CIDEF. Other schools represented include the University of Oregon, Kansas, Auburn, and Allegheny and Randolph-Macon Woman's Colleges. Tulane University in New Orleans registers students for an August summer session, known as Prestage, before sending them to La Sorbonne for the academic year. These programs serve to facilitate the process of studying abroad, in particular finding housing and the transfer of academic credit. American students may also take courses independently.

== Facilities ==
CIDEF shares the facilities of the Universite Catholique de L'Ouest and is located primarily in Hall Rene Bazin of UCO. Computers with internet access are available to CIDEF students, and Wi-Fi network access is available as of January 2006. CIDEF students also have access to UCO's main library. Notre Dame has its own private computer room with 5 computers, two bookshelves, 6 chairs, two printers, and a mural.
