= Fred Poché =

French philosopher

Fred Poché (born 21 May 1960) is a French philosopher. Bachelor of philosophy from the Institut Catholique de Paris, higher degree in language sciences from the University of Paris III: Sorbonne nouvelle, PhD in philosophy (Paris X-Nanterre), and accreditation awarded (Habilitation) by the University of Strasbourg as supervisor of doctoral students. He is professor of contemporary philosophy at the Catholic University of the West in Angers. His research concerns social philosophy and covers the following fields: recognition, dignity, vulnerability, memories, wounds, racism, contextuality and politics.

Finot Prize for 2009 awarded by the Academy of Moral and Political Sciences for Blessures intimes, blessures sociales. De la plainte à la solidarité, Paris, Cerf, 2008.

== Published works ==
- Une éthique du vivre ensemble. La philosophie sociale de Cornel West, Lyon, Chronique Sociale, 2017.
- La culture de l'autre. Une lecture postcoloniale d'Emmanuel Levinas, Lyon, Chronique sociale, 2015
- Le temps des oubliés. Refaire la démocratie, Lyon, Chronique sociale, 2014.
- Edward W. Said, l’humaniste radical. Aux sources de la pensée postcoloniale, Paris, Éditions du Cerf, 2013.
- A-t-on encore le droit d'être fragile?: entretiens avec Francesca Piolot, Lyon, Chronique sociale, 2013.
- Blessures intimes, blessures sociales. De la plainte à la solidarité, Paris, Éditions du Cerf, 2008, (Jean Finot Prize: Academy of Moral and Political Sciences).
- El pensamiento de lo social en Jacques Derrida. Para comprender la deconstrucción, Prologo de Victor Florian, Editorial Bonaventuriana, Bogota, Colombia, 2008.
- Penser avec Jacques Derrida. Comprendre la déconstruction, Lyon, Chronique Sociale, 2007.
- Lévinas chemin ou obstacle à la théologie chrétienne. L’hospitalité des intelligences, Paris, Éditions du Cerf, 2005.
- Organiser la résistance sociale, Lyon, Chronique sociale, 2005.
- Une politique de la fragilité. Éthique, dignité et luttes sociales, Paris, Éditions du Cerf, 2004.
- L'échec traversé (avec Véronique Margron) Paris, Desclée de Brouwer, 2003.
- J'ai envie de savoir (avec Bruno Hubert), postface d’Albert Jacquard, Paris, Éditions de l'Atelier, 2001.
- Reconstruire la dignité, Lyon, Chronique sociale, 2000.
- Penser avec Arendt et Lévinas. Du mal politique au respect de l'autre, Chronique Sociale, Lyon, en co-édition avec EVO, Bruxelles et Tricorne, Genève, 1998 (3e édition, 2009).
- Sujet, parole et exclusion, Une philosophie du sujet parlant, préface de Michèle Bertrand, Paris, Éditions L'Harmattan, 1996.
- L’homme et son langage, Introduction à la linguistique, Lyon, Chronique Sociale, 1993.

== English articles ==
- "Deterritorialization, globalization and citizenship", Concordia. Internationale Zeitschrift für Philosophie, n°66, 2014, p. 83-87.
- "Metaphor knowledge and truth, according to Paul Ricoeur", Edited by Raul Fornet-Betancourt, Justice, Knowledge and spirituality, Denktraditionen im Dialog : Studien zur Befreiung und InterkulturalitŠt, Band 36, Dokumentation des XVII. Internationalen Seminars des Dialogprogramms Nord-SŸd, Wissenschaftsverlag Mainz 2014, p. 183-186.
