= Journal of Men, Masculinities and Spirituality =

- Discipline: men's studies
- Language: English
- Edited by: Joseph Gelfer

Publication details
- History: 2007-2012
- Publisher: online (New Zealand)
- Frequency: biannual
- Open access: Yes

Standard abbreviations
- ISO 4: J. Men Masculinities Spiritual.

Indexing
- ISSN: 1177-2484

Links
- Journal homepage

Journal of Men, Masculinities and Spirituality (JMMS) was a free, online, scholarly, peer-reviewed, interdisciplinary, open access journal about men's studies. JMMS was established 2007, and was published twice a year with provision for other special editions. JMMS was founded by Joseph Gelfer.

== Overview ==
JMMS seeks to be as inclusive as possible in its area of enquiry. Papers address the full spectrum of masculinities and sexualities, particularly those which are seldom heard. Similarly, JMMS addresses not only monotheistic religions and spiritualities but also Eastern, indigenous, new religious movements and other spiritualities which resist categorization. JMMS papers address historical and contemporary phenomena as well as speculative essays about future spiritualities.

The first issue of JMMS featured, published in January 2007, an editorial by Joseph Gelfer; research notes of Yvonne Maria Werner and Anna Prestjan; articles by Roland Boer, Frank A. Salamone, David Shneer, Juan M. Marin and Rini Bhattacharya Mehta; and book reviews by Joseph Gelfer, James Bryant, Wisam Mansour, Sophie Smith, Katharina von Kellenbach and Nathan Abrams.

Issues of JMMS are included in the Informit e-Library, an Australasian online scholarly research repository.

== Bibliography ==
- The Best of Journal of Men, Masculinities and Spirituality, Joseph Gelfer (ed.). Gorgias PressLlc, 2010. ISBN 1611430038.
