= Robert Corillion =

French botanist (1908–1997)

Robert J. Corillion (26 January 1908 – 30 December 1997) was a French botanist.
