= Baab =

Baab can refer to:

- The Báb (1819-1850), founder of Bábism
- Báb, Nitra District, village in Slovakia
- Heinrich Baab, German Gestapo officer
- Mike Baab, American football player
