= Oswald Poche =

German secret police chief

Oswald Poche (28 January 1908 – 22 September 1962) was chief of the Gestapo, (secret state police) of Nazi Germany in Frankfurt where he organized mass deportations of Jews to Nazi concentration camps and extermination camps. During the Second World War, he commanded Einsatzkommando 2 in the Soviet Union.

== Life ==
Poche was born in Brandenburg an der Havel and joined the Nazi Party on 1 December 1930 (membership number 378,342). He later joined the SS (member number 267,316) and reached the rank of SS-Obersturmbannführer on 30 January 1939. He served in the Gestapo at the state police control center in Stettin (today, Szczecin) until March 1941.

In March 1941, Poche was appointed chief of the Gestapo at the State Police Lindenstrasse Station in Frankfurt. He pursued the policy of Final Solution of the Jews in Frankfurt. Poche, by using the Gestapo power between 10 October 1941 and 24 September 1942, organized ten major deportations of about 10,000 Jews to Nazi concentration camps and extermination camps. Poche initiated together with the Chief of Department II, Superintendent Ernst Grosse, the emergency services for all these deportations. By fall 1942, the deportation of all Jews from Frankfurt was essentially complete. Oswald Poche as Gestapo chief of the Police Lindenstrasse Station used Grosse and Heinrich Baab to carry out his orders.

From September 1943, he served as the successor to Reinhard Breder as the commander of Einsatzkommando 2, part of Einsatzgruppe A, during the war in the east against the Soviet Union. This task force had committed the 1941–42 mass murder of Jews and political commissars in the wake of Army Group North. In early 1944, a bomb attack by Soviet partisans severely wounded Poche. He returned to Frankfurt to recover with his wife and two sons. On 1 May 1944, he was appointed the Kommandeur der Sicherheitspolizei und des SD (KdS) in Tromsø, in the Reichskommissariat Norwegen where he remained almost until the war's end. In April 1945, Poche was at the Reich Security Main Office (RSHA) office in Berlin. He escaped to Hamburg, and using false papers in the name of the brother of his wife, Koch, he was able to live with his family in Salzwedel, where he worked as a traveling salesman. He died in a hospital in Dannenberg.
