= Gestapo =

Secret police of Nazi Germany

Gestapo Geheime Staatspolizei
- Gestapo headquarters at Prinz-Albrecht-Straße 8 in Berlin (1933)

Agency overview
- Formed: 26 April 1933; 93 years ago
- Preceding agency: Prussian Secret Police (founded 1851)
- Dissolved: 8 May 1945; 81 years ago
- Employees: 32,000 (1944 est.)

Jurisdictional structure
- Legal jurisdiction: Germany and occupied Europe
- General nature: Secret police

Operational structure
- Headquarters: Prinz-Albrecht-Straße 8, Berlin; 52°30′25″N 13°22′58″E
- Ministers responsible: Hermann Göring 1933–1934, Minister President of Prussia; Wilhelm Frick 1936–1943, Interior Minister; Heinrich Himmler, Chief of the German Police, 1936–1945; Interior Minister, 1943–1945
- Agency executives: Rudolf Diels (1933–1934); Reinhard Heydrich (1934–1939); Heinrich Müller (1939–1945)
- Parent agency: Allgemeine SS; Reich Security Main Office; Sicherheitspolizei

The Geheime Staatspolizei ([ɡəˈhaɪmə ˈʃtaːtspoliˌtsaɪ], lit. 'Secret State Police', abbreviated Gestapo [ɡəˈstaːpo]), was the official secret police of Nazi Germany and in German-occupied Europe.

The force was created by Hermann Göring in 1933 by combining the various political police agencies of Prussia into one organisation. On 20 April 1934, oversight of the Gestapo passed to the head of the Schutzstaffel (SS), Heinrich Himmler, who was also appointed Chief of German Police by Hitler in 1936. Instead of being exclusively a Prussian state agency, the Gestapo became a national one as a sub-office of the Sicherheitspolizei (SiPo; Security Police). From 27 September 1939, it was administered by the Reich Security Main Office (RSHA). It became known as Amt (Dept) 4 of the RSHA and was considered a sister organisation to the Sicherheitsdienst (SD; Security Service).

The Gestapo committed widespread atrocities during its existence. The Gestapo was used against the Nazis' political opponents, ideological dissenters (clergy and religious organisations), career criminals, the Sinti and Roma population, handicapped persons, homosexuals, and above all, Jews. Those arrested by the Gestapo were often held without judicial process, and political prisoners throughout Germany—from 1941 throughout the occupied territories under the Night and Fog Decree (German: Nacht und Nebel)—simply disappeared while in Gestapo custody. Contrary to popular perception, the Gestapo was actually a relatively small organisation with limited surveillance capability; still it proved extremely effective due to the willingness of ordinary Germans to report on fellow citizens. During World War II, the Gestapo played a key role in the Holocaust. When World War II concluded, the Gestapo was declared a criminal organisation by the International Military Tribunal (IMT) at the Nuremberg trials, and several top Gestapo members were sentenced to death.

== History ==
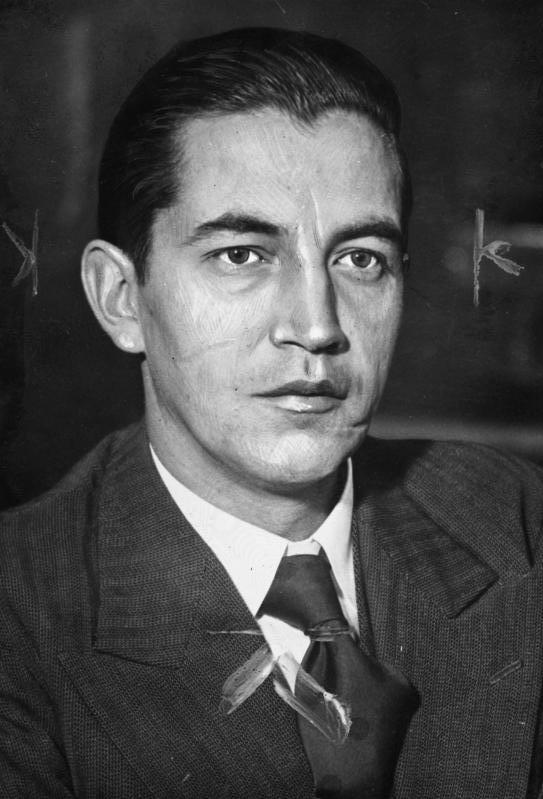
Rudolf Diels, first Commander of the Gestapo; 1933–1934

After Adolf Hitler became Chancellor of Germany, Hermann Göring—future commander of the Luftwaffe and the number-two man in the Nazi Party—was named Interior Minister of Prussia. This gave Göring command of the largest police force in Germany. Soon afterward, Göring detached the political and intelligence sections from the police and filled their ranks with Nazis. On 26 April 1933, Göring merged the two units as the Geheime Staatspolizei, which was abbreviated by a post office clerk for a franking stamp and became known as the "Gestapo". He originally wanted to name it the Secret Police Office (Geheimes Polizeiamt), but the German initials "GPA" looked and sounded too similar to those of the Soviet State Political Directorate (Gosudarstvennoye Politicheskoye Upravlenie, or GPU).

The first commander of the Gestapo was Rudolf Diels, a protégé of Göring, with the title of chief of Abteilung Ia (Department 1a) of the Prussian Secret Police. Diels was best known as the primary interrogator of Marinus van der Lubbe after the Reichstag fire. In late 1933, the Reich Interior Minister Wilhelm Frick wanted to integrate all the police forces of the German states under his control. Göring outflanked him by removing the Prussian political and intelligence departments from the state interior ministry. Göring took over the Gestapo in 1934 and urged Hitler to extend the agency's authority throughout Germany. This represented a radical departure from German tradition, which held that law enforcement was (mostly) a Land (state) and local matter. In this, he ran into conflict with Schutzstaffel (SS) chief Heinrich Himmler who was police chief of the second most powerful German state, Bavaria. Frick did not have the political power to take on Göring by himself so he allied with Himmler. With Frick's support, Himmler (pushed on by his right-hand man, Reinhard Heydrich) took over the political police in state after state. Soon only Prussia was left.

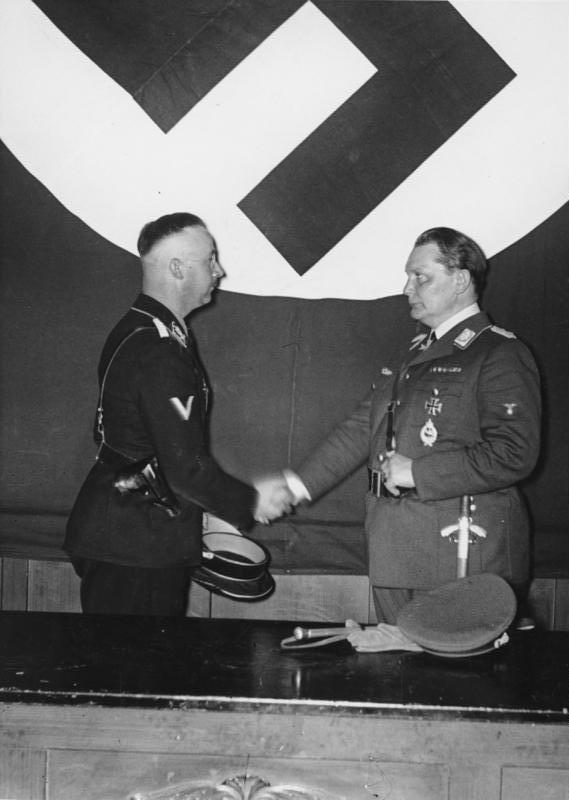
Heinrich Himmler and Hermann Göring at the meeting to formally hand over control of the Gestapo (Berlin, 1934)

Concerned that Diels was not ruthless enough to effectively counteract the power of the Sturmabteilung (SA), Göring handed over control of the Gestapo to Himmler on 20 April 1934. Also on that date, Hitler appointed Himmler chief of all German police outside Prussia. Heydrich, named chief of the Gestapo by Himmler on 22 April 1934, also continued as head of the SS Security Service (Sicherheitsdienst, SD). Himmler and Heydrich both immediately began installing their own personnel in select positions, several of whom were directly from the Bavarian Political Police, such as Heinrich Müller, Franz Josef Huber, and Josef Meisinger. Many of the Gestapo employees in the newly established offices were young and highly educated in a wide variety of academic fields and moreover, represented a new generation of National Socialist adherents, who were hard-working, efficient, and prepared to carry the Nazi state forward through the persecution of their political opponents.

By the spring of 1934, Himmler's SS controlled the SD and the Gestapo, but for him, there was still a problem, as technically the SS (and the Gestapo by proxy) was subordinated to the SA, which was under the command of Ernst Röhm. Himmler wanted to free himself entirely from Röhm, whom he viewed as an obstacle. Röhm's position was menacing as more than 4.5 million men fell under his command once the militias and veterans organisations were absorbed by the SA, a fact which fuelled Röhm's aspirations; his dream of fusing the SA and Reichswehr together was undermining Hitler's relationships with the leadership of Germany's armed forces. Several Nazi chieftains, among them Göring, Joseph Goebbels, Rudolf Hess, and Himmler, began a concerted campaign to convince Hitler to take action against Röhm. Both the SD and Gestapo released information concerning an imminent putsch by the SA. Once persuaded, Hitler acted by setting into action Himmler's SS, who then proceeded to murder over 100 of Hitler's identified antagonists. The Gestapo supplied the information which implicated the SA and ultimately enabled Himmler and Heydrich to emancipate themselves entirely from the organisation. For the Gestapo, the next two years following the Night of the Long Knives, a term describing the putsch against Röhm and the SA, were characterised by "behind-the-scenes political wrangling over policing".

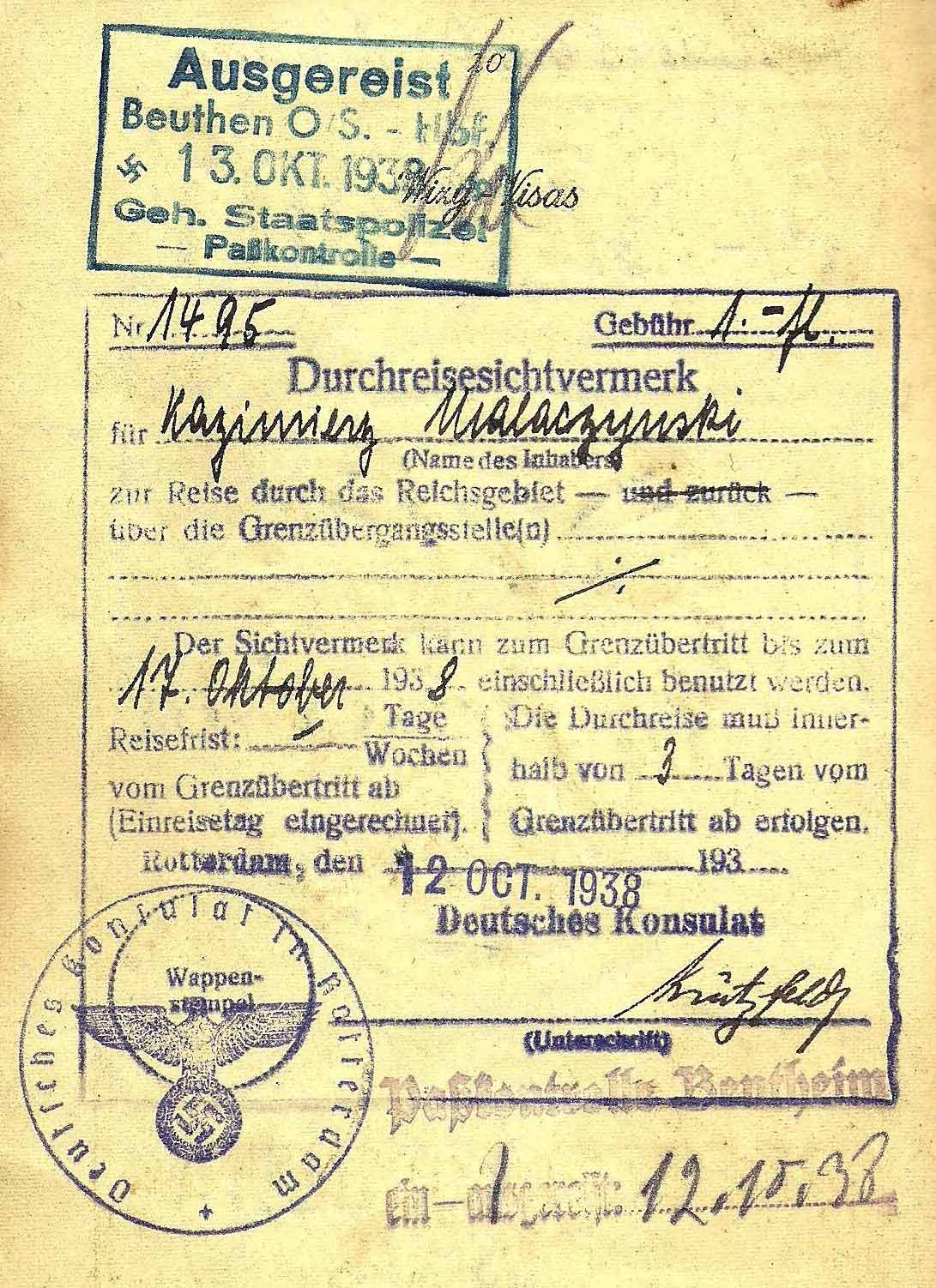
1938 Gestapo border inspection stamp applied when leaving Germany

On 17 June 1936, Hitler decreed the unification of all police forces in Germany and named Himmler as Chief of German Police. This action effectively merged the police into the SS and removed it from Frick's control. Himmler was nominally subordinate to Frick as police chief, but as Reichsführer-SS, he answered only to Hitler. This move also gave Himmler operational control over Germany's entire detective force. The Gestapo became a national state agency. Himmler also gained authority over all of Germany's uniformed law enforcement agencies, which were amalgamated into the new Ordnungspolizei (Orpo; Order Police), which became a national agency under SS general Kurt Daluege. Shortly thereafter, Himmler created the Kriminalpolizei (Kripo; Criminal Police), merging it with the Gestapo into the Sicherheitspolizei (SiPo; Security Police), under Heydrich's command. Heinrich Müller was at that time the Gestapo operations chief. He answered to Heydrich, Heydrich answered only to Himmler, and Himmler answered only to Hitler.

The Gestapo had the authority to investigate cases of treason, espionage, sabotage and criminal attacks on the Nazi Party and Germany. The basic Gestapo law passed by the government in 1936 gave the Gestapo carte blanche to operate without judicial review—in effect, putting it above the law. The Gestapo was specifically exempted from responsibility to administrative courts, where citizens normally could sue the state to conform to laws. As early as 1935, a Prussian administrative court had ruled that the Gestapo's actions were not subject to judicial review. The SS officer Werner Best, one-time head of legal affairs in the Gestapo, summed up this policy by saying, "As long as the police carries out the will of the leadership, it is acting legally".

On 27 September 1939, the security and police agencies of Nazi Germany—with the exception of the Order Police—were consolidated into the Reich Security Main Office (RSHA), headed by Heydrich. The Gestapo became Amt IV (Department IV) of RSHA and Müller became the Gestapo Chief, with Heydrich as his immediate superior. After Heydrich's 1942 assassination, Himmler assumed the leadership of the RSHA until January 1943, when Ernst Kaltenbrunner was appointed chief. Müller remained the Gestapo Chief. His direct subordinate Adolf Eichmann headed the Gestapo's Office of Resettlement and then its Office of Jewish Affairs (Referat IV B4 or Sub-Department IV, Section B4). During the Holocaust, Eichmann's department within the Gestapo coordinated the mass deportation of European Jews to the Nazis' extermination camps.

The power of the Gestapo included the use of what was called Schutzhaft—"protective custody"—a euphemism for the power to imprison people without judicial proceedings. An oddity of the system was that the prisoner had to sign his own Schutzhaftbefehl, an order declaring that the person had requested imprisonment—presumably out of fear of personal harm. In addition, political prisoners throughout Germany—and from 1941, throughout the occupied territories under the Night and Fog Decree (German: Nacht und Nebel)—simply disappeared while in Gestapo custody. Up to 30 April 1944, at least 6,639 persons were arrested under Nacht und Nebel orders. However, the total number of people who disappeared as a result of this decree is not known.

== Counterintelligence ==
The Polish government-in-exile in London during World War II received sensitive military information about Nazi Germany from agents and informants throughout Europe. After Germany conquered Poland (in the autumn of 1939), Gestapo officials believed that they had neutralised Polish intelligence activities. However, certain Polish information about the movement of German police and SS units to the East during 1941 German invasion of the Soviet Union was similar to information British intelligence secretly obtained through intercepting and decoding German police and SS messages sent by radio telegraphy.

In 1942, the Gestapo discovered a cache of Polish intelligence documents in Prague and were surprised to see that Polish agents and informants had been gathering detailed military information and smuggling it out to London, via Budapest and Istanbul. The Poles identified and tracked German military trains to the Eastern front and identified four Order Police battalions sent to occupied areas of the Soviet Union in October 1941 that engaged in war crimes and mass murder.

Polish agents also gathered detailed information about the morale of German soldiers in the East. After uncovering a sample of the information the Poles had reported, Gestapo officials concluded that Polish intelligence activity represented a very serious danger to Germany. As late as 6 June 1944, Heinrich Müller—concerned about the leakage of information to the Allies—set up a special unit called Sonderkommando Jerzy that was meant to root out the Polish intelligence network in western and southwestern Europe.

In Austria, there were groups still loyal to the Habsburgs, who unlike most across the Greater German Reich, remained determined to resist the Nazis. These groups became a special focus of the Gestapo because of their insurrectionist goals—the overthrow of the Nazi regime, the re-establishment of an independent Austria under Habsburg leadership—and Hitler's hatred of the Habsburg family. Hitler vehemently rejected the centuries' old Habsburg pluralist principles of "live and let live" with regard to ethnic groups, peoples, minorities, religions, cultures and languages. Habsburg loyalist Karl Burian's (who was later executed) plan to blow up the Gestapo headquarters in Vienna represented a unique attempt to act aggressively against the Gestapo. Burian's group had also set up a secret courier service to Otto von Habsburg in Belgium. Individuals in Austrian resistance groups led by Heinrich Maier also managed to pass along the plans and the location of production facilities for V-1, V-2 rockets, Tiger tanks, and aircraft (Messerschmitt Bf 109, Messerschmitt Me 163 Komet, etc.) to the Allies. The Maier group informed very early about the mass murder of Jews. The resistance group, later discovered by the Gestapo because of a double agent of the Abwehr, was in contact with Allen Dulles, the head of the US Office of Strategic Services in Switzerland. Although Maier and the other group members were severely tortured, the Gestapo did not uncover the essential involvement of the resistance group in Operation Crossbow and Operation Hydra. (Note: Operation Crossbow was one preliminary missions for Operation Overlord. See: Operation Crossbow – Preliminary missions for the Operation Overlord)

== Suppression of resistance and persecution ==
Early in the regime's existence, harsh measures were meted out to political opponents and those who resisted Nazi doctrine, such as members of the Communist Party of Germany (KPD); a role originally performed by the SA until the SD and Gestapo undermined their influence and took control of Reich security. Because the Gestapo seemed omniscient and omnipotent, the atmosphere of fear they created led to an overestimation of their reach and strength; a faulty assessment which hampered the operational effectiveness of underground resistance organisations.

=== Trade unions ===
Shortly after the Nazis came to power, they decided to dissolve the 28 federations of the General German Trade Union Confederation, because Hitler—after noting their success in the works council elections—intended to consolidate all German workers under the Nazi government's administration, a decision he made on 7 April 1933. As a preface to this action, Hitler decreed 1 May as National Labour Day to celebrate German workers, a move the trade union leaders welcomed. With their trade union flags waving, Hitler gave a rousing speech to the 1.5 million people assembled on Berlin's Tempelhofer Feld that was nationally broadcast, during which he extolled the nation's revival and working class solidarity. On the following day, the newly formed Gestapo officers, who had been shadowing some 58 trade union leaders, arrested them wherever they could find them—many in their homes. Meanwhile, the SA and police occupied trade union headquarters, arrested functionaries, confiscated their property and assets; all by design so as to be replaced on 12 May by the German Labour Front (DAF), a Nazi organisation placed under the leadership of Robert Ley. For their part, this was the first time the Gestapo operated under its new name since its 26 April 1933 founding in Prussia.

=== Implications of the Nuremberg Laws ===
The Nuremberg Laws of September 1935 materially transformed the scope of Gestapo enforcement by dramatically expanding the range of denunciable behavior. Even expressions of sympathy toward Jews, or the mere appearance of social proximity, became actionable under the new legislation. Popular responses across Germany ranged from enthusiastic endorsement to passive accommodation, but the practical consequence was uniform: the laws made it considerably easier for private individuals to weaponize the Gestapo against neighbours, competitors, or former associates, irrespective of their own ideological disposition.

=== Religious dissent ===
Many parts of Germany (where religious dissent existed upon the Nazi seizure of power) saw a rapid transformation; a change as noted by the Gestapo in conservative towns such as Würzburg, where people acquiesced to the regime either through accommodation, collaboration, or simple compliance. Increasing religious objections to Nazi policies led the Gestapo to carefully monitor church organisations. For the most part, members of the church did not offer political resistance but simply wanted to ensure that organizational doctrine remained intact.

However, the Nazi regime sought to suppress any source of ideology other than its own, and set out to muzzle or crush the churches in the so-called Kirchenkampf. When Church leaders (clergy) voiced their misgiving about the euthanasia program and Nazi racial policies, Hitler intimated that he considered them "traitors to the people" and went so far as to call them "the destroyers of Germany". The extreme anti-semitism and neo-pagan heresies of the Nazis caused some Christians to outright resist, and Pope Pius XI to issue the encyclical Mit brennender Sorge denouncing Nazism and warning Catholics against joining or supporting the Party. Some pastors, like the Protestant clergyman Dietrich Bonhoeffer, paid for their opposition with their lives. (Note: Bonhoeffer was an active opponent of Nazism in the German resistance movement. Arrested by the Gestapo in 1943, he was sent to Buchenwald and later to Flossenbürg concentration camp where he was executed.)

In an effort to counter the strength and influence of spiritual resistance, Nazi records reveal that the Gestapo's Referat B1 monitored the activities of bishops very closely—instructing that agents be set up in every diocese, that the bishops' reports to the Vatican should be obtained and that the bishops' areas of activity must be found out. Deans were to be targeted as the "eyes and ears of the bishops" and a "vast network" established to monitor the activities of ordinary clergy: "The importance of this enemy is such that inspectors of security police and of the security service will make this group of people and the questions discussed by them their special concern".

In Dachau: The Official History 1933–1945, Paul Berben wrote that clergy were watched closely, and frequently denounced, arrested and sent to Nazi concentration camps: "One priest was imprisoned in Dachau for having stated that there were good folk in England too; another suffered the same fate for warning a girl who wanted to marry an S.S. man after abjuring the Catholic faith; yet another because he conducted a service for a deceased communist". Others were arrested simply on the basis of being "suspected of activities hostile to the State" or that there was reason to "suppose that his dealings might harm society". Over 2,700 Catholic, Protestant, and Orthodox clergy were imprisoned at Dachau alone. After Heydrich (who was staunchly anti-Catholic and anti-Christian) was assassinated in Prague, his successor, Ernst Kaltenbrunner, relaxed some of the policies and then disbanded Department IVB (religious opponents) of the Gestapo.

=== Homosexuality ===
Violence and arrest were not confined to that opposing political parties, membership in trade unions, or those with dissenting religious opinions, but also homosexuality. It was viewed negatively by Hitler. Homosexuals were correspondingly considered a threat to the Volksgemeinschaft (National Community). From the Nazis rise to national power in 1933, the number of court verdicts against homosexuals steadily increased and only declined once the Second World War started. In 1934, a special Gestapo office was set up in Berlin to deal with homosexuality.

Despite male homosexuality being considered a greater danger to "national survival", lesbianism was likewise viewed as unacceptable—deemed gender nonconformity—and a number of individual reports on lesbians can be found in Gestapo files. (Note: The stricter laws did not apply to lesbians as their behaviour was never officially criminalised, even though their behaviours were labelled "deviant".) Between 1933 and 1935, some 4,000 men were arrested; between 1936 and 1939, another 30,000 men were convicted. If homosexuals showed any signs of sympathy to the Nazis' identified racial enemies, they were considered an even greater danger. According to Gestapo case files, the majority of those arrested for homosexuality were males between eighteen and twenty-five years of age.

=== Student opposition ===
Between June 1942 and March 1943, student protests were calling for an end to the Nazi regime. These included the non-violent resistance of Hans and Sophie Scholl, two leaders of the White Rose student group. However, resistance groups and those who were in moral or political opposition to the Nazis were stalled by the fear of reprisals from the Gestapo. Fearful of an internal overthrow, the forces of the Gestapo were unleashed on the opposition. Groups like the White Rose and others, such as the Edelweiss Pirates, and the Swing Youth, were placed under close Gestapo observation. Some participants were sent to concentration camps. Leading members of the most famous of these groups, the White Rose, were arrested by the police and turned over to the Gestapo. For several leaders the punishment was death. During the first five months of 1943, the Gestapo arrested thousands suspected of resistance activities and carried out numerous executions. Student opposition leaders were executed in late February, and a major opposition organisation, the Oster Circle, was destroyed in April 1943. Efforts to resist the Nazi regime amounted to very little and had only minor chances of success, particularly since a broad percentage of the German people did not support such actions.

=== General opposition and military conspiracy ===
Between 1934 and 1938, opponents of the Nazi regime and their fellow travellers began to emerge. Among the first to speak out were religious dissenters but following in their wake were educators, aristocratic businessmen, office workers, teachers, and others from nearly every walk of life. Most people quickly learned that open opposition was dangerous since Gestapo informants and agents were widespread. However, a significant number of them still worked against the National Socialist government.

In May 1935, the Gestapo broke up and arrested members of the "Markwitz Circle", a group of former socialists in contact with Otto Strasser, who sought Hitler's downfall. From the mid-1930s into the early 1940s—various groups made up of communists, idealists, working-class people, and far-right conservative opposition organisations covertly fought against Hitler's government, and several of them fomented plots that included Hitler's assassination. Nearly all of them, including: the Römer Group, Robby Group, Solf Circle, Schwarze Reichswehr, the Party of the Radical Middle Class, Jungdeutscher Orden, Schwarze Front and Stahlhelm were either discovered or infiltrated by the Gestapo. This led to corresponding arrests, being sent to concentration camps and execution. One of the methods employed by the Gestapo to contend with these resistance factions was 'protective detention' which facilitated the process in expediting dissenters to concentration camps and against which there was no legal defence.

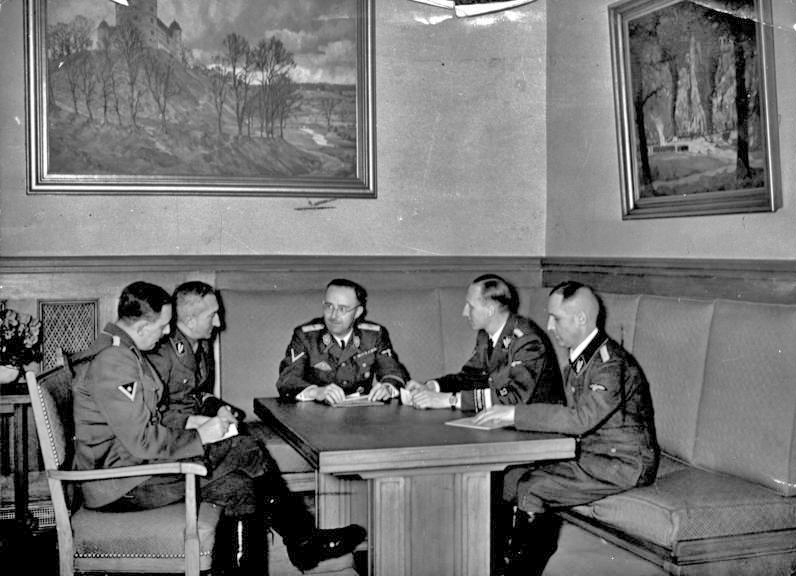
Photograph from 1939: shown from left to right are Franz Josef Huber, Arthur Nebe, Heinrich Himmler, Reinhard Heydrich and Heinrich Müller planning the investigation of the bomb assassination attempt on Adolf Hitler on 8 November 1939 in Munich.

Early efforts to resist the Nazis with aid from abroad were hindered when the opposition's peace feelers to the Western Allies did not meet with success. This was partly because of the Venlo incident of 9 November 1939, in which SD and Gestapo agents, posing as anti-Nazis in the Netherlands, kidnapped two British Secret Intelligence Service (SIS) officers after having lured them to a meeting to discuss peace terms. This prompted Winston Churchill to ban any further contact with the German opposition. Later, the British and Americans did not want to deal with anti-Nazis because they were fearful that the Soviet Union would believe they were attempting to make deals behind their back. (Note: More than that, the Anglo-American common language and capital interests kept Stalin at a distance since he felt the other Allied powers were hoping the fascists and Communists would destroy one another.)

The German opposition was in an unenviable position by the late spring and early summer of 1943. On one hand, it was next to impossible for them to overthrow Hitler and the party; on the other, the Allied demand for an unconditional surrender meant no opportunity for a compromise peace, which left the military and conservative aristocrats who opposed the regime no option (in their eyes) other than continuing the military struggle. Despite the fear of the Gestapo after mass arrests and executions in the spring, the opposition still plotted and planned. One of the more famous schemes, Operation Valkyrie, involved a number of senior German officers and was carried out by Colonel Claus Schenk Graf von Stauffenberg. In an attempt to assassinate Hitler, Stauffenberg planted a bomb underneath a conference table inside the Wolf's Lair field headquarters. Known as the 20 July plot, this assassination attempt failed and Hitler was only slightly injured. Reports indicate that the Gestapo was caught unaware of this plot as they did not have sufficient protections in place at the appropriate locations nor did they take any preventative steps. Stauffenberg and his group were shot on 21 July 1944; meanwhile, his fellow conspirators were rounded up by the Gestapo and sent to a concentration camp. Thereafter, there was a show trial overseen by Roland Freisler, followed by their execution.

Some Germans were convinced that it was their duty to apply all possible expedients to end the war as quickly as possible. Sabotage efforts were undertaken by members of the Abwehr (military intelligence) leadership, as they recruited people known to oppose the Nazi regime. The Gestapo cracked down ruthlessly on dissidents in Germany, just as they did everywhere else. Opposition became more difficult. Arrests, torture, and executions were common. Terror against "state enemies" had become a way of life to such a degree that the Gestapo's presence and methods were eventually normalised in the minds of people living in Nazi Germany.

== Organisation ==
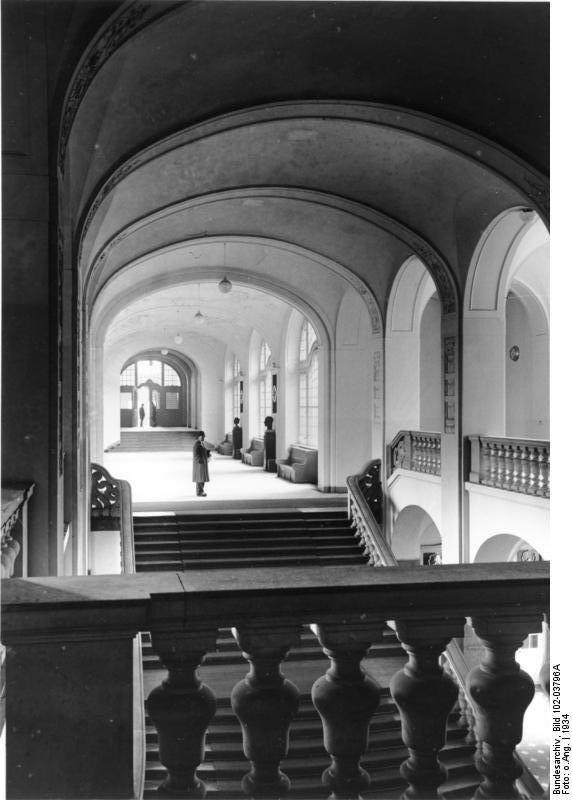
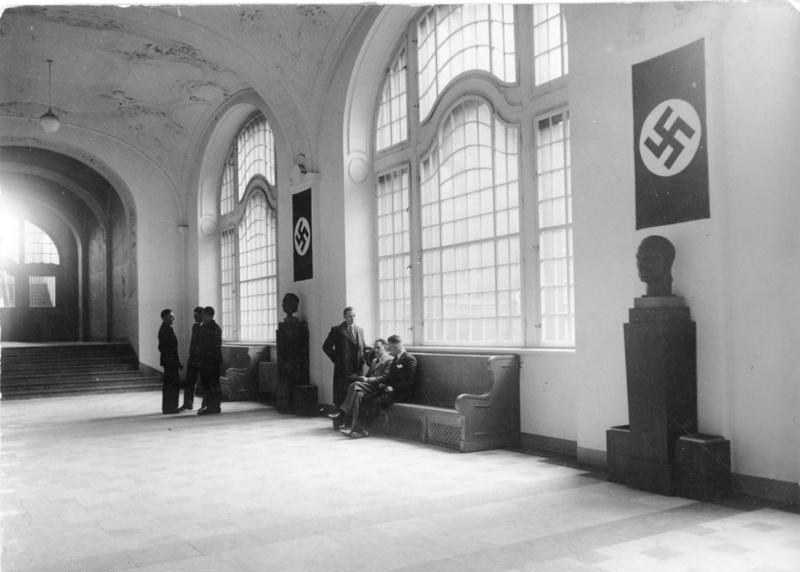
Interior of the Gestapo headquarters.

In January 1933, Hermann Göring, Hitler's minister without portfolio, was appointed the head of the Prussian Police and began filling the political and intelligence units of the Prussian Secret Police with Nazi Party members. A year after the organisation's inception, Göring wrote in a British publication about having created the organisation on his own initiative and how he was "chiefly responsible" for the elimination of the Marxist and Communist threat to Germany and Prussia. Describing the activities of the organisation, Göring boasted about the utter ruthlessness required for Germany's recovery, the establishment of concentration camps for that purpose, and even went on to claim that excesses were committed in the beginning, recounting how beatings took place here and there. On 26 April 1933, he reorganised the force's Amt III as the Gestapa (better-known by the "sobriquet" Gestapo), a secret state police intended to serve the Nazi cause. Less than two weeks later in early May 1933, the Gestapo moved into their Berlin headquarters at Prinz-Albrecht-Straße 8.

As a result of its 1936 merger with the Kripo (National criminal police) to form sub-units of the Sicherheitspolizei (SiPo; Security Police), the Gestapo was officially classified as a government agency. Himmler's subsequent appointment to Chef der Deutschen Polizei (Chief of German Police) and status as Reichsführer-SS made him independent of Interior Minister Wilhelm Frick's nominal control.

The SiPo was placed under the direct command of Reinhard Heydrich who was already chief of the Nazi Party's intelligence service, the Sicherheitsdienst (SD). The idea was to fully identify and integrate the party agency (SD) with the state agency (SiPo). Most SiPo members joined the SS and held a rank in both organisations. Nevertheless, in practice there was jurisdictional overlap and operational conflict between the SD and Gestapo.

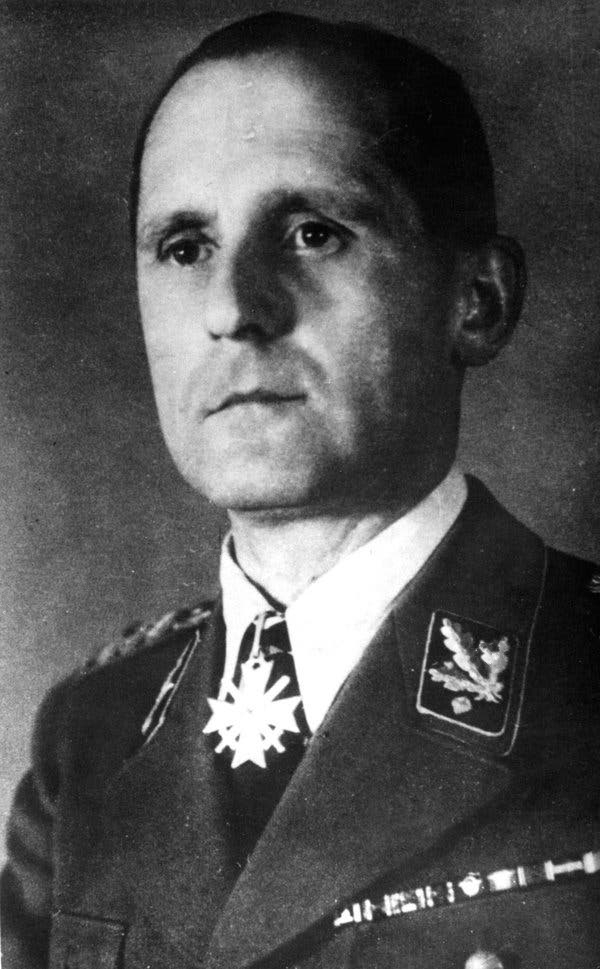
Heinrich Müller, Chief of the Gestapo; 1939–1945

In September 1939, the SiPo and SD were merged into the newly created Reichssicherheitshauptamt (RSHA; Reich Security Main Office). Both the Gestapo and Kripo became distinct departments within the RSHA. Although the Sicherheitspolizei was officially disbanded, the term SiPo was figuratively used to describe any RSHA personnel throughout the remainder of the war. In lieu of naming convention changes, the original construct of the SiPo, Gestapo, and Kripo cannot be fully comprehended as "discrete entities", since they ultimately formed "a conglomerate in which each was wedded to each other and the SS through its Security Service, the SD".

The creation of the RSHA represented the formalisation, at the top level, of the relationship under which the SD served as the intelligence agency for the security police. A similar co-ordination existed in the local offices. Within Germany and areas which were incorporated within the Reich for the purpose of civil administration, local offices of the Gestapo, criminal police, and SD were formally separate. They were subject to co-ordination by inspectors of the security police and SD on the staffs of the local higher SS and police leaders, however, and one of the principal functions of the local SD units was to serve as the intelligence agency for the local Gestapo units. In the occupied territories, the formal relationship between local units of the Gestapo, criminal police, and SD was slightly closer.

The Gestapo became known as RSHA Amt IV ("Department or Office IV") with Heinrich Müller as its chief. In January 1943, Himmler appointed Ernst Kaltenbrunner RSHA chief; almost seven months after Heydrich had been assassinated. The specific internal departments of Amt IV were as follows:

- Department A (Political Opponents)
  - Communists (A1)
  - Counter-sabotage (A2)
  - Reactionaries, liberals, and opposition (A3)
  - Protective services (A4)
- Department B (Sects and Churches)
  - Catholicism (B1)
  - Protestantism (B2)
  - Freemasons and other churches (B3)
  - Jewish affairs (B4)
- Department C (Administration and Party Affairs), central administrative office of the Gestapo, responsible for card files of all personnel including all officials.
  - Files, card, indexes, information, and administration (C1)
  - Protective custody (C2)
  - Press office (C3)
  - NSDAP matters (C4)
- Department D (Occupied Territories), administration for regions outside the Reich.
  - Protectorate affairs, Protectorate of Bohemia and Moravia, regions of Yugoslavia, Greece (D1)
    - 1st Belgrade Special Combat detachment
  - General Government(D2)
  - Confidential office – hostile foreigners, emigrants (D3)
  - Occupied territories – France, Belgium, Holland, Norway, Denmark (D4)
  - Occupied Eastern territories (D5)
- Department E (Security and counterintelligence)
  - In the Reich (E1)
  - Policy and economic formation (E2)
  - West (E3)
  - Scandinavia (North)(E4)
  - East (E5)
  - South (E6)

In 1941 Referat N, the central command office of the Gestapo was formed. However, these internal departments remained and the Gestapo continued to be a department under the RSHA umbrella. The local offices of the Gestapo, known as Gestapo Leitstellen and Stellen, answered to a local commander known as the Inspekteur der Sicherheitspolizei und des SD (Inspector of the Security Police and Security Service) who, in turn, was under the dual command of Referat N of the Gestapo and also his local SS and Police Leader.

In total, there were some fifty-four regional Gestapo offices across the German federal states. The Gestapo also maintained offices at all Nazi concentration camps, held an office on the staff of the SS and Police Leaders, and supplied personnel as needed to formations such as the Einsatzgruppen. Personnel assigned to these auxiliary duties were often removed from the Gestapo chain of command and fell under the authority of branches of the SS. It was the Gestapo chief, SS-Brigadierführer Heinrich Müller, who kept Hitler abreast of the killing operations in the Soviet Union and who issued orders to the four Einsatzgruppen that their continual work in the east was to be "presented to the Führer."

== Membership ==
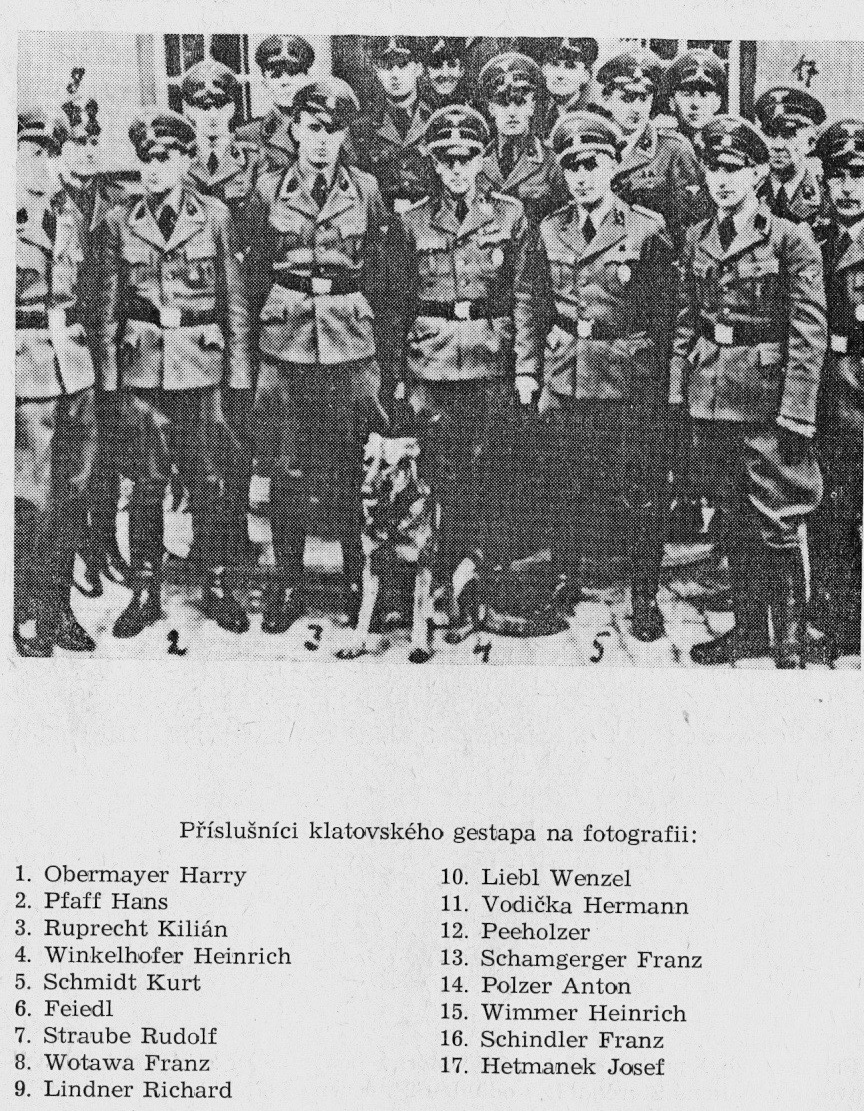
Gestapo members in Klatovy, German-occupied Czechoslovakia

In 1933, there was no purge of the German police forces. The vast majority of Gestapo officers came from the police forces of the Weimar Republic; members of the SS, the SA, and the Nazi Party also joined the Gestapo but were less numerous. By March 1937, the Gestapo employed an estimated 6,500 people in fifty-four regional offices across the Reich. Additional staff were added in March 1938 consequent the annexation of Austria and again in October 1938 with the acquisition of the Sudetenland. In 1939, only 3,000 out of the total of 20,000 Gestapo men held SS ranks, and in most cases, these were honorary. One man who served in the Prussian Gestapo in 1933 recalled that most of his co-workers "were by no means all Nazis. For the most part they were young professional civil service officers..." The Nazis valued police competence more than politics, so in general in 1933, almost all of the men who served in the various state police forces under the Weimar Republic stayed on in their jobs. In Würzburg, which is one of the few places in Germany where most of the Gestapo records survived, every member of the Gestapo was a career policeman or had a police background.

The Canadian historian Robert Gellately wrote that most Gestapo men were not Nazis, but at the same time were not opposed to the Nazi regime, which they were willing to serve, in whatever task they were called upon to perform. Over time, membership in the Gestapo included ideological training, particularly once Werner Best assumed a leading role for training in April 1936. Employing biological metaphors, Best emphasised a doctrine which encouraged members of the Gestapo to view themselves as 'doctors' to the 'national body' in the struggle against "pathogens" and "diseases"; among the implied sicknesses were "communists, Freemasons, and the churches—and above and behind all these stood the Jews". Heydrich thought along similar lines and advocated both defensive and offensive measures on the part of the Gestapo, so as to prevent any subversion or destruction of the National Socialist body.

Whether trained as police originally or not, Gestapo agents themselves were shaped by their socio-political environment. Historian George C. Browder contends that there was a four-part process (authorisation, bolstering, routinisation, and dehumanisation) in effect, which legitimised the psycho-social atmosphere conditioning members of the Gestapo to radicalised violence. Browder also describes a sandwich effect, where from above; Gestapo agents were subjected to ideologically oriented racism and criminal biological theories; and from below, the Gestapo was transformed by SS personnel who did not have the proper police training, which showed in their propensity for unrestrained violence. This admixture certainly shaped the Gestapo's public image which they sought to maintain despite their increasing workload; an image which helped them identify and eliminate enemies of the Nazi state.

=== Female criminal investigation career ===
According to regulations issued by the Reich Security Main Office in 1940, women who had been trained in social work or having a similar education could be hired as female detectives. Female youth leaders, lawyers, business administrators with experience in social work, female leaders in the Reichsarbeitsdienst and personnel administrators in the Bund Deutscher Mädel were hired as detectives after a one-year course, if they had several years professional experience. Later, nurses, kindergarten teachers, and trained female commercial employees with an aptitude for police work were hired as female detectives after a two-year course as Kriminaloberassistentin and could promote to a Kriminalsekretärin. After another two or three years in that grade, the female detective could advance to Kriminalobersekretärin. Further promotions to Kriminalkommissarin and Kriminalrätin were also possible.

== Leadership ==
No.	Portrait	Chief	Took office	Left office	Time in office	Party
1	Rudolf Diels	Rudolf Diels (1900–1957)	26 April 1933	20 April 1934	359 days	NSDAP
2	Reinhard Heydrich	Reinhard Heydrich (1904–1942)	22 April 1934	27 September 1939	5 years, 158 days	NSDAP
3	Heinrich Müller	Heinrich Müller (1900–1945)	27 September 1939	May 1945 †	5 years, 7 months	NSDAP

== Principal agents and officers ==
- Heinrich Baab (SiPo-SD Frankfurt)
- Klaus Barbie (SiPo-SD Lyon)
- Werner Best (SiPo-SD Copenhagen)
- Karl Bömelburg (Head of Gestapo, Southern France)
- Theodor Dannecker (SiPo-SD Paris)
- Rudolf Diels (Gestapo Chief 1933–1934)
- Adolf Eichmann (RSHA Berlin)
- Gerhard Flesch
- Hermann Göring (Founder of the Gestapo)
- Viktor Harnischfeger (Düsseldorf Gestapo Criminal Commissar)
- Reinhard Heydrich (SD, SiPo, Gestapo Chief 1934–1939, RSHA Chief 1939–1942)
- Heinrich Himmler (Reichsführer-SS)
- Ernst Kaltenbrunner (RSHA Chief 1943–1945)
- Herbert Kappler (SD Chief Rome)
- Werner Knab
- Helmut Knochen (Paris)
- Kurt Lischka (Paris)
- Ernst Misselwitz (Hauptscharführer SiPo-SD Paris)
- Heinrich Müller (Gestapo Chief 1939–1945)
- Carl Oberg (Paris)
- Pierre Paoli (Head of Gestapo, Central France)
- Oswald Poche (Chief of Frankfurt Lindenstrasse station)
- Henry Rinnan (Norwegian agent)
- Karl Eberhard Schöngarth (SiPo-SD General Government; Netherlands)
- Max Wielen

== Population ratios, methods, and effectiveness ==
Contrary to popular belief, the Gestapo was not the all-pervasive, omnipotent agency in German society. In Germany proper, many towns and cities had fewer than 50 official Gestapo personnel. For example, in 1939 Stettin and Frankfurt am Main only had a total of 41 Gestapo men combined. In Düsseldorf, the local Gestapo office of only 281 men were responsible for the entire Lower Rhine region, which comprised 4 million people. In lower Franconia, which included Würzburg, there were only twenty-two Gestapo officers overseeing 840,000 or more inhabitants; this meant that the Nazi secret police "was reliant on Germans spying on each other". These "V-men", as undercover Gestapo agents were known, were used to infiltrate Social Democratic Party of Germany (SPD) and Communist opposition groups, but this was more the exception than the rule. The Gestapo office in Saarbrücken had 50 full-term informers in 1939. The District Office in Nuremberg, which had the responsibility for all of northern Bavaria, employed a total of 80–100 full-term informers between 1943 and 1945. The majority of Gestapo informers were not full-term employees working undercover, but were rather ordinary citizens who chose to denounce other people to the Gestapo.

According to Canadian historian Robert Gellately's analysis of the local offices established, the Gestapo was—for the most part—made up of bureaucrats and clerical workers who depended upon denunciations by citizens for their information. Gellately argued that it was because of the widespread willingness of Germans to inform on each other to the Gestapo that Germany between 1933 and 1945 was a prime example of panopticism. The Gestapo—at times—was overwhelmed with denunciations and most of its time was spent sorting out the credible from the less credible denunciations. Many of the local offices were understaffed and overworked, struggling with the paper load caused by so many denunciations. Gellately has also suggested that the Gestapo was "a reactive organisation...constructed within German society and whose functioning was structurally dependent on the continuing co-operation of German citizens".

After 1939, when many Gestapo personnel were called up for war-related work such as service with the Einsatzgruppen, the level of overwork and understaffing at the local offices increased. For information about what was happening in German society, the Gestapo continued to be mostly dependent upon denunciations. 80% of all Gestapo investigations were started in response to information provided by denunciations by ordinary Germans; while 10% were started in response to information provided by other branches of the German government and another 10% started in response to information that the Gestapo itself unearthed. The information supplied by denunciations often led the Gestapo in determining who was arrested.

The popular picture of the Gestapo with its spies everywhere terrorising German society has been rejected by many historians as a myth invented after the war as a cover for German society's widespread complicity in allowing the Gestapo to work. Work done by social historians such as Detlev Peukert, Robert Gellately, Reinhard Mann, Inge Marssolek, René Otto, Klaus-Michael Mallmann and Paul Gerhard, which by focusing on what the local offices were doing has shown the Gestapo's almost total dependence on denunciations from ordinary Germans, and very much discredited the older "Big Brother" picture with the Gestapo having its eyes and ears everywhere. For example, of the 84 cases in Würzburg of Rassenschande ("race defilement"—sexual relations with non-Aryans), 45 (54%) were started in response to denunciations by ordinary people, two (2%) by information provided by other branches of the government, 20 (24%) via information gained during interrogations of people relating to other matters, four (5%) from information from (Nazi) NSDAP organisations, two (2%) during "political evaluations" and 11 (13%) have no source listed while none were started by Gestapo's own "observations" of the people of Würzburg.

An examination of 213 denunciations in Düsseldorf showed that 37% were motivated by personal conflicts, no motive could be established in 39%, and 24% were motivated by support for the Nazi regime. The Gestapo always showed a special interest in denunciations concerning sexual matters, especially cases concerning Rassenschande with Jews or between Germans and foreigners, in particular Polish slave workers; the Gestapo applied even harsher methods to the foreign workers in the country, especially those from Poland, Jews, Catholics and homosexuals. As time went by, anonymous denunciations to the Gestapo caused trouble to various NSDAP officials, who often found themselves being investigated by the Gestapo.

Of the political cases, 61 people were investigated for suspicion of belonging to the KPD, 44 for the SPD and 69 for other political parties. Most of the political investigations took place between 1933 and 1935 with the all-time high of 57 cases in 1935. After that year, political investigations declined with only 18 investigations in 1938, 13 in 1939, two in 1941, seven in 1942, four in 1943 and one in 1944. The "other" category associated with non-conformity included everything from a man who drew a caricature of Hitler to a Catholic teacher suspected of being lukewarm about teaching National Socialism in his classroom. The "administrative control" category concerned those who were breaking the law concerning residency in the city. The "conventional criminality" category concerned homosexuality and economic crimes such as money laundering and smuggling.

While the total number of Gestapo officials was limited when contrasted against the represented populations, the average Volksgenosse (Nazi term for the "member of the German people") was typically not under observation, so the statistical ratio between Gestapo officials and inhabitants is "largely worthless and of little significance" according to some recent scholars. As historian Eric Johnson remarked, "The Nazi terror was selective terror", with its focus upon political opponents, ideological dissenters (clergy and religious organisations), career criminals, the Sinti and Roma population, handicapped persons, homosexuals and above all, upon the Jews. "Selective terror" by the Gestapo, as mentioned by Johnson, is also supported by historian Richard Evans who states that, "Violence and intimidation rarely touched the lives of most ordinary Germans. Denunciation was the exception, not the rule, as far as the behaviour of the vast majority of Germans was concerned." The involvement of ordinary Germans in denunciations also needs to be put into perspective so as not to exonerate the Gestapo. As Evans makes clear, "...it was not the ordinary German people who engaged in surveillance, it was the Gestapo; nothing happened until the Gestapo received a denunciation, and it was the Gestapo's active pursuit of deviance and dissent that was the only thing that gave denunciations meaning." The Gestapo's effectiveness remained in the ability to "project" omnipotence...they co-opted the assistance of the German population by using denunciations to their advantage; proving in the end a powerful, ruthless and effective organ of terror under the Nazi regime that was seemingly everywhere. Lastly, the Gestapo's effectiveness, while aided by denunciations and the watchful eye of ordinary Germans, was more the result of the co-ordination and co-operation amid the various police organs within Germany, the assistance of the SS, and the support provided by the various Nazi Party organisations; all of them together forming an organised persecution network.

=== Torture ===
The Gestapo employed torture as a routine method to extract confessions, punish political enemies, and enforce ideological conformity in Nazi Germany, the official evidence for which was destroyed by the Nazis with Gestapo case-files being rarely found. Normal methods of investigation by the Gestapo included various forms of blackmail, threats, and extortion to secure "confessions". Beyond that, sleep deprivation and various forms of harassment were also used as investigative methods. The Gestapo periodically was known for planting evidence to resolve a case, especially if it concerned a Jewish person.

Historical research based on surviving Gestapo files has shown that torture was not limited to high-profile cases but was frequently used at the local level, especially in situations involving accusations of hiding Jews, listening to foreign radio broadcasts, or engaging in communist activity. Brutality on the part of interrogators—often prompted by denunciations and followed with roundups—enabled the Gestapo to uncover numerous resistance networks and in many ways, made them seem like they knew everything and could do anything they wanted. A simple denunciation could even lead to a person's death once in the Gestapo's hands. In his study of Gestapo files from Bavaria, historian Robert Gellately noted that many individuals were subjected to brutal treatment as part of routine investigative procedures. Historian Eric A. Johnson further corroborates this brutal treatment in cities like Cologne, where detainees were physically and mentally abused to obtain names of collaborators or co-conspirators.

Once an individual was brought in by the Gestapo, Richard Evans asserted that one could expect in many cases "brutal violence and torture" and a course of interrogation that often "ended in the courts, the prisons and the camps." Many detainees bypassed the courts entirely through a mechanism known as Schutzhaft ("protective custody"). Once a Schutzhaftbefehl was signed by someone deemed an authority—often a simple administrative form—the detainee was shipped to a camp, frequently following brutal interrogation in Gestapo prisons. This allowed the Gestapo to imprison individuals indefinitely without trial and transfer them directly to concentration camps such as Dachau, Buchenwald, or Ravensbrück.

== Operations in Nazi-occupied territories ==
As an instrument of Nazi power, terror, and repression, the Gestapo operated throughout occupied Europe. Much like their affiliated organisations, the SS and the SD, the Gestapo "played a leading part" in enslaving and deporting workers from occupied territory, torturing and executing civilians, singling out and murdering Jews, and subjecting Allied prisoners of war to terrible treatment. To this end, the Gestapo was "a vital component both in Nazi repression and the Holocaust." Once the German armies advanced into enemy territory, they were accompanied by Einsatzgruppen staffed by officers from the Gestapo and Kripo, who usually operated in the rear areas to administer and police the occupied land. Whenever a region came fully under German military occupational jurisdiction, the Gestapo administered all executive actions under the military commander's authority, albeit operating relatively independent of it.

A former partisan and Soviet officer named Hersch Gurewicz attested to the torture methods used by the Gestapo. He recalled a partisan was strapped to a table in a room and "a German turned the lever and the table moved apart in sections like a rack. The man screamed and his leg bones snapped through his skin. The lever turned again and his arms ripped in jagged tears. After the man fainted, his torturers shot him dead." He also claimed that he had been strapped down and a wire slowly forced up his nose, into his lung, causing him to go unconscious. Later he was tied to a horse, which was made to gallop full speed, and recalled being smashed into the ground repeatedly, before being knocked out by a solid object.

Occupation meant administration and policing, a duty assigned to the SS, the SD, and the Gestapo even before hostilities began, as was the case for Czechoslovakia. Correspondingly, Gestapo offices were established in a territory once occupied. (Note: Petschek Palace was the Gestapo headquarters in Prague. See for instance the following article in Radio Prague International: https://english.radio.cz/petscheks-palace-once-headquarters-nazi-secret-police-8575365) Some locals aided the Gestapo, whether as professional police auxiliaries or in other duties. Nonetheless, operations performed either by German members of the Gestapo or auxiliaries from willing collaborators of other nationalities were inconsistent in both disposition and effectiveness. Varying degrees of pacification and police enforcement measures were necessary in each place, dependent on how cooperative or resistant the locals were to Nazi mandates and racial policies.

Throughout the Eastern territories, the Gestapo and other Nazi organisations co-opted the assistance of indigenous police units, nearly all of whom were uniformed and able to carry out drastic actions. Many of the auxiliary police personnel operating on behalf of German Order Police, the SD, and Gestapo were members of the Schutzmannschaft, which included staffing by Ukrainians, Belarusians, Russians, Estonians, Lithuanians, and Latvians. While in many countries the Nazis occupied in the East, the local domestic police forces supplemented German operations, noted Holocaust historian, Raul Hilberg, asserts that "those of Poland were least involved in anti-Jewish actions." Nonetheless, German authorities ordered the mobilisation of reserve Polish police forces, known as the Blue Police, which strengthened the Nazi police presence and carried out numerous "police" functions; in some cases, its functionaries even identified and rounded up Jews or performed other unsavory duties on behalf of their German masters.

In places like Denmark, there were some 550 uniformed Danes in Copenhagen working with the Gestapo, patrolling and terrorising the local population at the behest of their German overseers, many of whom were arrested after the war. Other Danish civilians, like in many places across Europe, acted as Gestapo informants but this should not be seen as wholehearted support for the Nazi program, as motives for co-operation varied. Whereas in France, the number of members in the Carlingue (French Gestapo) who worked on behalf of the Nazis was upwards of 30,000 to 32,000; they conducted operations nearly indistinguishable from their German equivalents.

== Nuremberg trials ==
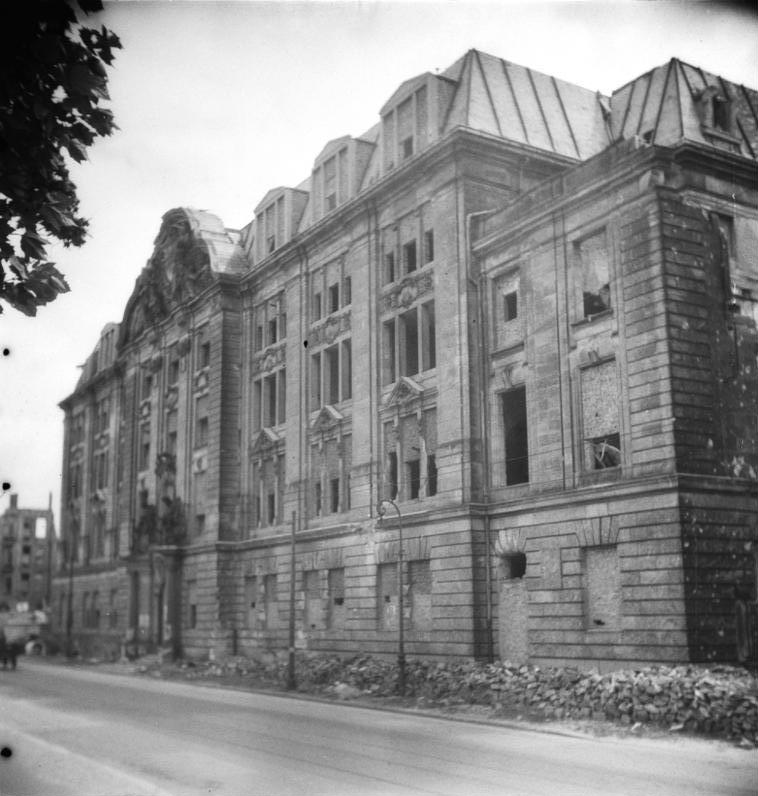
Gestapo headquarters at Prinz-Albrecht-Straße 8, after the 1945 bombing.

Between 14 November 1945 and 3 October 1946, the Allies established an International Military Tribunal (IMT) to try 22 major Nazi war criminals and six groups for crimes against peace, war crimes and crimes against humanity. Nineteen of the 22 were convicted, and twelve—Martin Bormann (in absentia), Hans Frank, Wilhelm Frick, Hermann Göring, Alfred Jodl, Ernst Kaltenbrunner, Wilhelm Keitel, Joachim von Ribbentrop, Alfred Rosenberg, Fritz Sauckel, Arthur Seyss-Inquart, Julius Streicher—were given the death penalty. Three—Walther Funk, Rudolf Hess, Erich Raeder—received life terms; and the remaining four—Karl Dönitz, Konstantin von Neurath, Albert Speer, and Baldur von Schirach—received shorter prison sentences. Three others—Hans Fritzsche, Hjalmar Schacht, and Franz von Papen—were acquitted. At that time, the Gestapo was condemned as a criminal organisation, along with the SS. However, Gestapo leader Heinrich Müller was never tried, as he disappeared at the end of the war. (Note: There were reports that Müller ended up in the foreign secret service at Washington D.C., some allege he was in Moscow working for the Soviets, still others claimed he escaped to South America—but none of the myths have ever been proven; all of which adds to the "mysterious power of the Gestapo".)

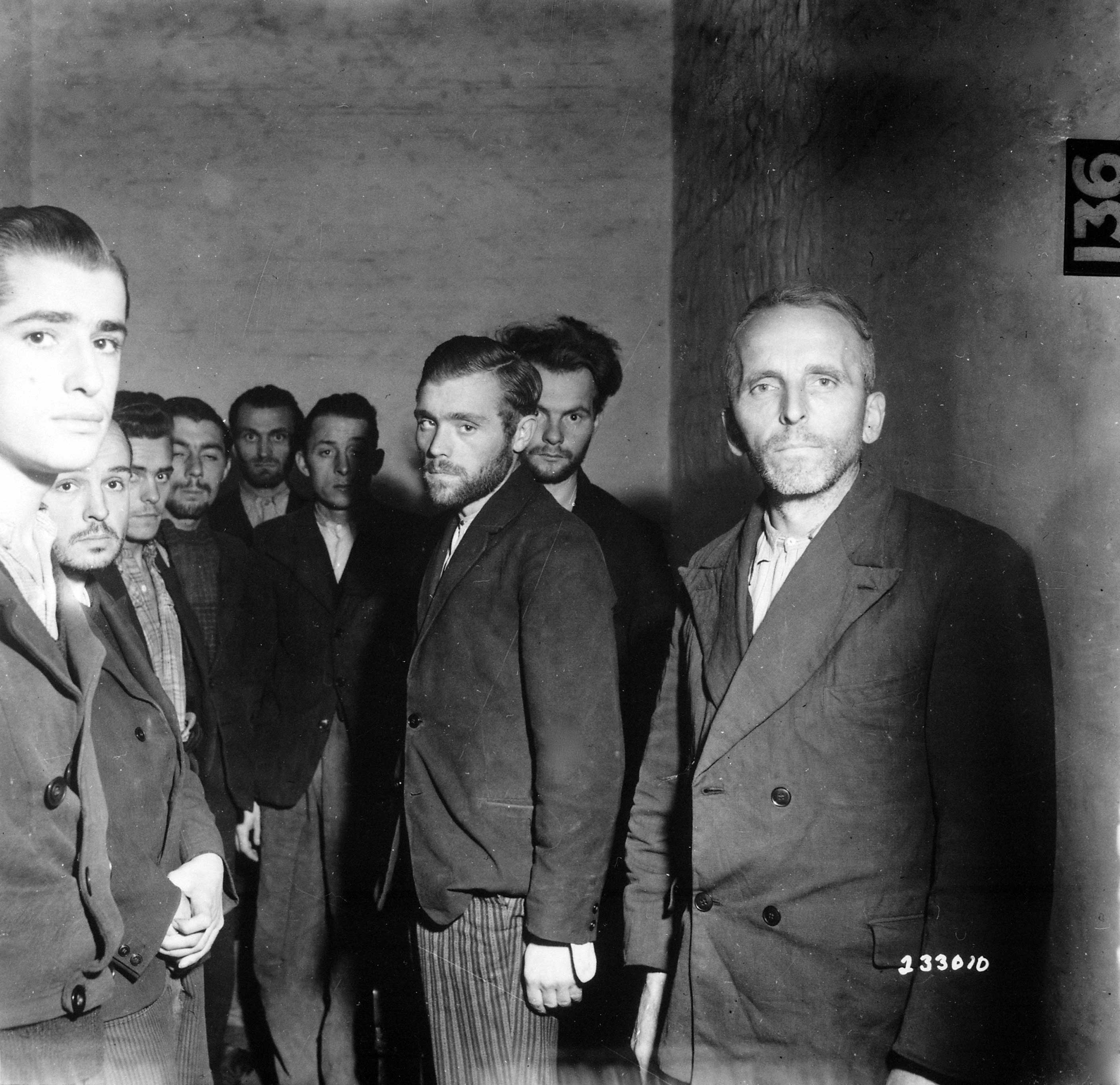
German Gestapo agents arrested after the liberation of Liège, Belgium are pictured in a cell at the Citadel of Liège, October 1944

Leaders, organisers, investigators and accomplices participating in the formulation or execution of a common plan or conspiracy to commit the crimes specified were declared responsible for all acts performed by any persons in execution of such plan. The official positions of defendants as heads of state or holders of high government offices were not to free them from responsibility or mitigate their punishment; nor was that a defendant acted pursuant to an order of a superior to excuse him from responsibility, although it might be considered by the IMT in mitigation of punishment.

At the trial of any individual member of any group or organisation, the IMT was authorised to declare (in connection with any act of which the individual was convicted) that the group or organisation to which he belonged was a criminal organisation. When a group or organisation was thus declared criminal, the competent national authority of any signatory had the right to bring persons to trial for membership in that organisation, with the criminal nature of the group or organisation assumed proved.

The IMT subsequently convicted three of the groups: the Nazi leadership corps, the SS (including the SD) and the Gestapo. Gestapo members Hermann Göring, Ernst Kaltenbrunner and Arthur Seyss-Inquart were individually convicted. While three groups were acquitted of collective war crimes charges, this did not relieve individual members of those groups from conviction and punishment under the denazification programme. Members of the three convicted groups, however, were subject to apprehension by Britain, the United States, the Soviet Union, and France. These groups—the Nazi Party and government leadership, the German General staff and High Command (OKW); the Sturmabteilung (SA); the Schutzstaffel (SS), including the Sicherheitsdienst (SD); and the Gestapo—had an aggregate membership exceeding two million, making a large number of their members liable to trial when the organisations were convicted.

== Aftermath ==
In 1997, Cologne transformed the former regional Gestapo headquarters in Cologne—the EL-DE Haus—into a museum to document the Gestapo's actions.

After the war, U.S. Counterintelligence Corps employed the former Lyon Gestapo chief Klaus Barbie for his anti-communist efforts and also helped him escape to Bolivia.

== Ranks and uniforms ==
The Gestapo was a secretive plainclothes agency and agents typically wore civilian suits. There were strict protocols protecting the identity of Gestapo field personnel. When asked for identification, an operative was required only to present his warrant disc and not a picture identification. This disc identified the operative as a member of the Gestapo without revealing personal information, except when ordered to do so by an authorised official.

Leitstellung (district office) staff did wear the grey SS service uniform, but with police-pattern shoulderboards, and SS rank insignia on the left collar patch. The right collar patch was black without the sig runes. The SD sleeve diamond (SD Raute) insignia was worn on the lower left sleeve, even by SiPo men who were not in the SD. Uniforms worn by Gestapo men assigned to the Einsatzgruppen in occupied territories, were at first indistinguishable from the Waffen-SS field uniform. Complaints from the Waffen-SS led to a change of rank insignia shoulder boards from those of the Waffen-SS to those of the Ordnungspolizei.

The Gestapo maintained police detective ranks which were used for all officers, both those who were and who were not concurrently SS members. (Note: Although an agent in uniform wore the collar insignia of the equivalent SS rank, he was still addressed as, e.g., Herr Kriminalrat, not Sturmbannführer. The stock character of the "Gestapo Major", usually dressed in the prewar black SS uniform, is a figment of Hollywood's imagination.)

Junior career	Senior career	Orpo equivalent	SS equivalent
Kriminalassistentanwärter		Wachtmeister	Unterscharführer
Kriminalassistent		Oberwachtmeister	Scharführer
Kriminaloberassistent		Revieroberwachtmeister	Oberscharführer
Kriminalsekretär		Hauptwachtmeister	Hauptscharführer
		Meister	Sturmscharführer
Kriminalobersekretär	Hilfskriminalkommissar; Kriminalkommissar auf Probe apl. Kriminalkommissar	Leutnant	Untersturmführer
Kriminalinspektor	Kriminalkommissar with less than three years in that rank	Oberleutnant	Obersturmführer
	Kriminalkommissar; Kriminalrat with less than three years in that rank	Hauptmann	Hauptsturmführer
	Kriminalrat; Kriminaldirektor; Regierungs und Kriminalrat	Major	Sturmbannführer
	Oberregierungs und Kriminalrat	Oberstleutnant	Obersturmbannführer
	Regierungs und Kriminaldirektor; Reichskriminaldirektor	Oberst	Standartenführer; Oberführer

- Junior career = einfacher Vollzugsdienst der Sicherheitspolizei (Laufbahn U 18: SS-Unterführer der Sicherheitspolizei und des SD).
- Senior career = leitender Vollzugsdienst der Sicherheitspolizei (Laufbahn XIV: SS-Führer der Sicherheitspolizei und des SD)

Rank insignia

Sicherheitspolizei	Rank insignia	Sicherheitsdienst
Kriminalassistent		SS-Scharführer
Kriminaloberassistent		SS-Oberscharführer
Kriminalsekretär		SS-Hauptscharführer
Kriminalobersekretär		SS-Untersturmführer
Kriminalinspektor		SS-Obersturmführer
Kriminalkommissar		SS-Hauptsturmführer
Kriminalrat with more than three years in the grade		SS-Sturmbannführer
Kriminaldirektor		SS-Sturmbannführer
Regierungs- und Kriminalrat		SS-Sturmbannführer
Oberregierungs- und Kriminalrat		SS-Obersturmbannführer
Regierungs- und Kriminaldirektor		SS-Standartenführer
Reichskriminaldirektor		SS-Oberführer

== See also ==
- Geheime Feldpolizei
- Hamburg State Police Headquarters

== Bibliography ==
- Ahlers, Sieglinde (2001). "Frauen in der Polizei". In Doris Freer (ed.). Von Griet zu Emma: Beiträge zur Geschichte von Frauen in Duisburg vom Mittelalter bis heute (PDF). Duisburg: Frauenbüro. OCLC 248422045. Archived (PDF) from the original on 29 November 2020.
- "Avalon Project – Yale University". Nazi Conspiracy and Aggression. Washington, DC: US Government Printing Office.
- Ayçoberry, Pierre (1999). The Social History of the Third Reich, 1933–1945. New York: The New Press. ISBN 978-1-56584-635-7.
- Banach, Jens (2013). "Polizei im NS-System – Ausbildung und Rekrutierung in der Sicherheitspolizei". In Hans Jürgen Lange (ed.). Die Polizei der Gesellschaft: Zur Soziologie der inneren Sicherheit (in German). Opladen: VS Verlag für Sozialwissenschaften. ISBN 978-3-663-09757-0.
- Bauz, Ingrid; Sigrid Brüggemann; Roland Maier, eds. (2013). Die Geheime Staatspolizei in Württemberg und Hohenzollern. Stuttgart: Schmetterling. ISBN 3-89657-138-9.
- Benz, Wolfgang (2007). A Concise History of the Third Reich. Berkeley and Los Angeles: University of California Press. ISBN 978-0-520-25383-4.
- Berben, Paul (1975). Dachau, 1933–45: The Official History. London: Norfolk Press. ISBN 978-0-85211-009-6.
- Bernstein, Victor H. (1947). Final Judgment: The Story of Nuremberg. New York: Boni & Gaer. ISBN 978-1-163-16417-4.
- Boeckl-Klamper, Elisabeth; Mang, Thomas; Neugebauer, Wolfgang (2018). Gestapo-Leitstelle Wien, 1938–1945 (in German). Wien: Edition Steinbauer. ISBN 978-3-90249-483-2.
- Bönisch, Georg; Wiegrefe, Klaus (20 January 2011). "From Nazi to Criminal to Post-War Spy: German Intelligence Hired Klaus Barbie as Agent". Der Spiegel.
- Breitman, Richard (2005). U.S. Intelligence and the Nazis. Cambridge and New York: Cambridge University Press. ISBN 978-0-521-61794-9.
- Broucek, Peter (2008). Militärischer Widerstand: Studien zur österreichischen Staatsgesinnung und NS-Abwehr (in German). Wien: Böhlau. ISBN 978-3-20577-728-1.
- Browder, George C (1996). Hitler's Enforcers: The Gestapo and the SS Security Service in the Nazi Revolution. Oxford and New York: Oxford University Press. ISBN 978-0-19-820297-4.
- Buchheim, Hans (1968). "The SS: Instrument of Domination". In Krausnick, Helmut; Buchheim, Hans; Broszat, Martin; Jacobsen, Hans-Adolf (eds.). Anatomy of the SS State. New York: Walker and Company. ISBN 978-0-00-211026-6.
- Burleigh, Michael (2000). The Third Reich: A New History. New York: Hill and Wang. ISBN 978-0-8090-9325-0.
- Childers, Thomas (2017). The Third Reich: A History of Nazi Germany. New York: Simon & Schuster. ISBN 978-1-45165-113-3.
- Craig, William (1973). Enemy at the Gates: The Battle for Stalingrad (1st ed.). Old Saybrook, CT: Konecky & Konecky. ISBN 1-56852-368-8.
- Crankshaw, Edward (2002). Gestapo: Instrument of Tyranny. Mechanicsburg, PA: Greenhill Books. ISBN 978-1-85367-481-5.
- Dams, Carsten; Stolle, Michael (2014). The Gestapo: Power and Terror in the Third Reich. Oxford and New York: Oxford University Press. ISBN 978-0-19-966921-9.
- Delarue, Jacques (1964). The Gestapo: A History of Horror. New York: Dell. ISBN 978-0-913729-45-8.
- Delarue, Jacques (2008) [1964]. The Gestapo: A History of Horror. New York: Skyhorse. ISBN 978-1-60239-246-5.
- Evans, Richard (2005). The Coming of the Third Reich. New York: Penguin. ISBN 978-0-14-303469-8.
- Evans, Richard J. (2006). The Third Reich in Power. New York: Penguin Group. ISBN 978-0-14-303790-3.
- Evans, Richard (2010). The Third Reich at War. New York: Penguin. ISBN 978-0-14-311671-4.
- Flaherty, T. H. (2004) [1988]. The Third Reich: The SS. Time-Life Books, Inc. ISBN 978-1-84447-073-0.
- Frei, Norbert (1993). National Socialist Rule in Germany: The Führer State, 1933–1945. Cambridge, MA: Wiley-Blackwell. ISBN 978-0-631-18507-9.
- Gellately, Robert (1992). The Gestapo and German Society: Enforcing Racial Policy, 1933–1945. New York: Oxford University Press. ISBN 978-0-19-820297-4.
- Gellately, Robert (2020). Hitler's True Believers: How Ordinary People Became Nazis. Oxford and New York: Oxford University Press. ISBN 978-0-19068-990-2.
- Gruchmann, Lothar (1981). "'Nacht und Nebel' Justiz. Die Mitwirkung deutscher Strafgerichte an der Bekämpfung des Widerstandes in den besetzten westeuropäischen Ländern 1942–1944". Vierteljahrshefte für Zeitgeschichte (in German). 29 (3). Munich: Oldenbourg Wissenschaftsverlag GmbH: 342–396. JSTOR 30195217.
- Hesse, Klaus; Kufeke, Kay; Sander, Andreas (2010). Topography of Terror: Gestapo, SS and Reich Security Main Office on Wilhelm- and Prinz-Alberecht Strasse: A Documentation. Berlin: Stiftung Topographie des Terrors. ISBN 978-3-94177-207-6.
- Hilberg, Raul (1992). Perpetrators, Victims, Bystanders: The Jewish Catastrophe, 1933–1945. New York: Harper Collins. ISBN 0-8419-0910-5.
- Hildebrand, Klaus (1984). The Third Reich. London and New York: Routledge. ISBN 978-0-04-943033-4.
- Hoffmann, Peter (1977). The History of the German Resistance, 1933–1945. Cambridge, MA: MIT Press. ISBN 978-0-262-08088-0.
- Höhne, Heinz (2001). The Order of the Death's Head: The Story of Hitler's SS. New York: Penguin Press. ISBN 978-0-14-139012-3.
- Holbraad, Carsten (2017). Danish Reactions to German Occupation. London: UCL Press. ISBN 978-1-91130-751-8.
- Johnson, Eric (1999). Nazi Terror: The Gestapo, Jews, and Ordinary Germans. New York: Basic Books. ISBN 978-0-465-04908-0.
- Kershaw, Ian (2008). Hitler: A Biography. New York: W. W. Norton & Company. ISBN 978-0-39306-757-6.
- Krausnick, Helmut, et al. (1968). Anatomy of the SS State. New York; Walker and Company. ISBN 978-0-00-211026-6
- Lemkin, Raphael (2008). Axis Rule in Occupied Europe: Laws of Occupation, Analysis of Government, Proposals for Redress. Clark, NJ: Lawbook Exchange, Ltd. ISBN 978-1-58477-901-8.
- Longerich, Peter (2012). Heinrich Himmler: A Life. Oxford: Oxford University Press. ISBN 978-0-19-959232-6.
- Longerich, Peter (2019). Hitler: A Biography. Oxford and New York: Oxford University Press. ISBN 978-0-19251-574-2.
- Mallmann, Klaus-Michael; Paul, Gerhard (1994). "Omniscient, Omnipotent, Omnipresent? Gestapo, Society, and Resistance". In David Crew (ed.). Nazism and German Society, 1933–1945. New York and London: Routledge. ISBN 978-0-415-08240-2.
- Manchester, William (2003). The Arms of Krupp, 1587–1968: The Rise and Fall of the Industrial Dynasty that Armed Germany at War. New York & Boston: Back Bay Books.
- Manvell, Roger; Fraenkel, Heinrich (2011). Goering. New York: Skyhorse Publishing. ISBN 978-1-61608-109-6.
- McDonough, Frank (2005). Opposition and Resistance in Nazi Germany. Cambridge and New York: Cambridge University Press. ISBN 978-0-521-00358-2.
- McDonough, Frank (2017). The Gestapo: The Myth and Reality of Hitler's Secret Police. New York: Skyhorse Publishing. ISBN 978-1-51071-465-6.
- McNab, Chris (2009). The SS: 1923–1945. Amber Books Ltd. ISBN 978-1-906626-49-5.
- Merson, Allan (1985). Communist Resistance in Nazi Germany. New York: New York University Press. ISBN 978-0-85315-601-7.
- Miller, Michael (2006). Leaders of the SS and German Police, Vol. 1. R. James Bender Publishing. ISBN 978-93-297-0037-2.
- Mollo, Andrew (1992). Uniforms of the SS. Vol. 5. Sicherheitsdienst und Sicherheitspolizei 1931–1945. London: Windrow & Greene. ISBN 978-1-87200-462-4.
- Museenkoeln.de. "NSDOK". NS-Dokumentationszentrum der Stadt Köln.
- Overy, Richard (1997). Why the Allies Won. New York: W. W. Norton & Company. ISBN 978-0-393-31619-3.
- Peukert, Detlev (1989). Inside Nazi Germany: Conformity, Opposition, and Racism in Everyday Life. New Haven and London: Yale University Press. ISBN 978-0-300-04480-5.
- Rajsfus, Maurice (1995). La police de Vichy: les forces de l'ordre françaises au service de la Gestapo, 1940–1944 [The Vichy Police Force: The French Security Forces in the Service of the Gestapo, 1940–1944] (in French). Paris: Le cherche midi éditeur. ISBN 978-2-86274-358-5.
- Rees, Laurence (1997). The Nazis: A Warning from History. New York: New Press. ISBN 978-0-563-49333-4.
- Reitlinger, Gerald (1989). The SS: Alibi of a Nation, 1922–1945. New York: Da Capo Press. ISBN 978-0-306-80351-2.
- Russell, Edward Frederick Langley (2002). The Scourge of the Swastika: A History of Nazi War Crimes During World War II. New York: Skyhorse. ISBN 1-85367-498-2.
- Schmid, Heinrich (1947). Apokalyptisches Wetterleuchten: Ein Beitrag der Evangelischen Kirche zum Kampf im Dritten Reich (in German). München: Verag der Evangelisch-Lutherischen Kirche in Bayern. ASIN B00279MGQS.
- Shirer, William (1990). The Rise and Fall of the Third Reich. New York: MJF Books. ISBN 978-1-56731-163-1.
- Smith, Michael (2004). "Bletchley Park and the Holocaust". Intelligence and National Security. 19 (2): 262–274. doi:10.1080/0268452042000302994. S2CID 154692491.
- Skibińska, Alina (2012). "Perpetrators Self-Portrait: The Accused Village Administrators, Commune Heads, Fire Chiefs, Forest Rangers, and Gamekeepers". In Jan Gross (ed.). The Holocaust in Occupied Poland: New Findings and New Interpretations. Frankfurt am Main: Peter Lang. ISBN 978-3-63163-124-9.
- Snyder, Louis (1994) [1976]. Encyclopedia of the Third Reich. Da Capo Press. ISBN 978-1-56924-917-8.
- Spielvogel, Jackson (1992). Hitler and Nazi Germany: A History. New York: Prentice Hall. ISBN 978-0-13-393182-2.
- State of Israel (1992). The Trial of Adolf Eichmann: Record of Proceedings in the District Court of Jerusalem. Vol. 1. Jerusalem: State of Israel, Ministry of Justice. ISBN 978-9-65279-010-1.
- Steigmann-Gall, Richard (2003). The Holy Reich: Nazi Conceptions of Christianity, 1919–1945. New York and London: Cambridge University Press. ISBN 978-0-521-82371-5.
- Thurner, Christoph (2017). The CASSIA Spy Ring in World War II Austria: A History of the OSS's Maier-Messner Group. Jefferson, NC: McFarland. ISBN 978-1-47662-991-9.
- Trentmann, Frank (2023). Out of the Darkness: The Germans, 1942–2022. New York: Alfred A. Knopf. ISBN 978-1-52473-291-2.
- Tuchel, Johannes; Schattenfroh, Reinhold (1987). Zentrale des Terrors. Prinz-Albrecht-Straße 8: Hauptquartier der Gestapo (in German). Frankfurt am Main, Olten, and Wien: Büchergilde Gutenberg. ISBN 978-3-7632-3340-3.
- Ulrich, Herbert (1998). "'Von der Gegenerbekampfung zur "rassischen Generalprävention". "Schutzhaft" und Konzentrationslager in der Konzeption der Gestapo-Führung, 1933–1939'". In Herbert Ulrich; Karin Orth; Christoph Dieckmann (eds.). Die nationalsozialistischen Konzentrationslager. Entwicklung und Struktur (in German). Vol. 1. Göttingen: Wallstein. ISBN 3-89244-289-4.
- USHMM. "Gestapo". United States Holocaust Memorial Museum – Holocaust Encyclopedia.
- USHMM. "Law and Justice in the Third Reich". United States Holocaust Memorial Museum – Holocaust Encyclopedia.
- US National Archives (2000). "Press Release nr00-52: German Police Records Opened at the National Archives". United States National Archives.
- Wallbaum, Klaus (2009). Der Überläufer: Rudolf Diels (1900–1957), der erste Gestapo-Chef des Hitler-Regimes (in German). Frankfurt am Main: Peter Lang. ISBN 978-3-631-59818-4.
- Weale, Adrian (2010). The SS: A New History. London: Little, Brown. ISBN 978-1-4087-0304-5.
- Weale, Adrian (2012). Army of Evil: A History of the SS. New York: Caliber Printing. ISBN 978-0-451-23791-0.
- Williams, Max (2001). Reinhard Heydrich: The Biography: Volume 1. Church Stretton: Ulric. ISBN 978-0-9537577-5-6.
- Williamson, David (2002). The Third Reich (3rd ed.). London: Longman Publishers. ISBN 978-0-582-36883-5.
