= Hamburg State Police Headquarters =

Central office of the Gestapo in Hamburg

The Hamburg State Police Headquarters was the central office of the Geheime Staatspolizei (Gestapo) in Hamburg during the National Socialist era. Its predecessor was the Hamburg State Police, which was officially called the Secret State Police from December 1935. The Hamburg Gestapo office was later elevated to control center and was ultimately the superior authority of various Gestapo branch offices in northern Germany. Members of the Hamburg Gestapo were significantly involved in the persecution and mistreatment of opponents of the Nazi regime, Jews and other Nazi victim groups. After the British Army marched into Hamburg in early May 1945, former members of the Hamburg Gestapo were for the most part interned and often had to answer for their actions in court. At the former Gestapo headquarters Hamburger Stadthaus, the victims of state police persecution are commemorated today by a memorial plaque and Stolpersteine. The City of Hamburg is planning to set up a documentation site for the memory of the victims of police violence there. There is currently no comprehensive academic study on the Hamburg Gestapo.

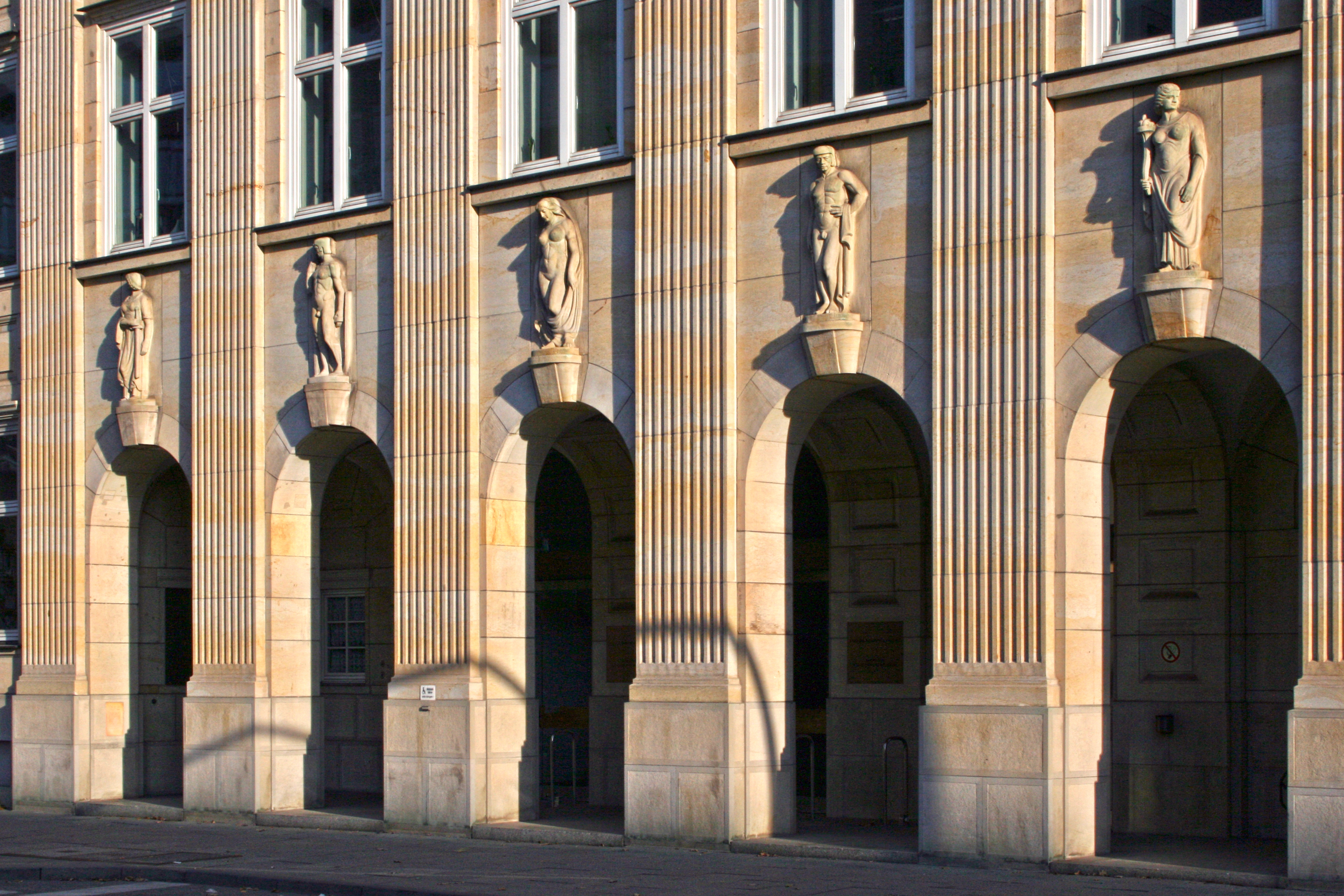
Stadthaus Hamburg annex, entrance to the former Department of Urban Development and the Environment, until 1943 entrance to the Gestapo headquarters, under the arcades on the left the memorial plaque for Gestapo victims.

== Forerunner of the Hamburg Gestapo: Hamburg State Police ==
Immediately after the Reichstag election on 5 March 1933, the National Socialists took control of the police in Hamburg, among other things. The Hamburg State Police was now also under the control of the new police senator and police chief Alfred Richter, and was gleichschaltung when he took office on 6 March 1933. As the Political Police Hamburg's Political Police, it was known as the Secret State Police from December 1935. It had already expanded its significance on the basis of the Reichstag Fire Decree of 28 February 1933, with which citizens could be deprived of their central civil liberties and alleged or actual opponents of the Nazi regime could be arbitrarily taken into protective custody.

Known Nazi opponents and "politically unreliable" officers of the Hamburg State Police were suspended and dismissed or assigned to less important police functions after the Law for the Restoration of the Professional Civil Service came into force in April 1933. The majority of Hamburg State Police personnel were replaced: National Socialist officers were transferred from other police stations to the Hamburg State Police and vacancies were filled in particular with unemployed SA and SS men. However, a number of long-serving, experienced officers of the Hamburg State Police remained in their positions.

By March 1933, the Hamburg State Police had 70 officers, a number that more than doubled to 151 officers by the beginning of 1934. In March 1933, the head of the Hamburg State Police was a member of the local NSDAP Gauleitung Anatol Milewski-Schroeden, who was replaced on 15 May 1933 by Captain Walter Abraham of the Schutzpolizei. On 20 October 1933 the SS leader Bruno Streckenbach succeeded Abraham in office Abraham in office.

On 6 October 1933 the Hamburg Senate separated the Hamburg State Police from the criminal investigation department and placed it under the command of Reichsführer SS on 24 November 1933 Heinrich Himmler. This removed the influence on the Hamburg State Police from Senator of the Interior Richter and the newly appointed Police President Wilhelm Boltz, who succeeded Hans Nieland in this function after a vacancy.

=== Crushing the workers' resistance ===
In the first years after the National Socialist seizure of power, the primary goal of the Hamburg state police was to crush the workers' resistance. On the evening of 5 March 1933 the Hamburg Gauleiter Karl Kaufmann commissioned the National Socialist police officer Peter Kraus to head a Hamburg State Police search unit, which was to smash communist and socialist groups operating illegally in particular. From 24 March 1933 to January 1934, the 36-member "Kommando zur besonderen Verwendung" (KzbV) of the Ordnungspolizei, which cooperated closely with the "Fahndungskommando Kraus", existed under the leadership of Lieutenant Franz Kosa. Within a few months, numerous political opponents of the Nazi regime were tracked down and arrested. Members of the Red Front Fighters' League and the KPD district leadership were initially at the center of state police persecution. The opponents of National Socialism who were taken into protective custody were often severely abused during their arrest and during "aggravated interrogation|aggravated interrogation". From March 1933 to October 1934, members of the Hamburg State Police arrested over 5,000 Communists. Preliminary investigations by the state police led to around 600 trials before the Hamburg Higher Regional Court and 100 trials before the People's Court on charges of preparation for high treason by 1939. As a result of the penetration of the illegal KPD with V-Leuten and informers, the illegal Hamburg party leadership initially discontinued the continuation of organized resistance in the spring of 1936.

Although leading Social Democrats had already been arrested in June 1933 and were temporarily detained, the Hamburg state police did not step up their action against the Social Democratic resistance until October 1934. The social democratic resistance organized by members of the Reichsbanner and the SPD was crushed by 1937.

=== Gestapo office - The town hall as a "place of terror" ===
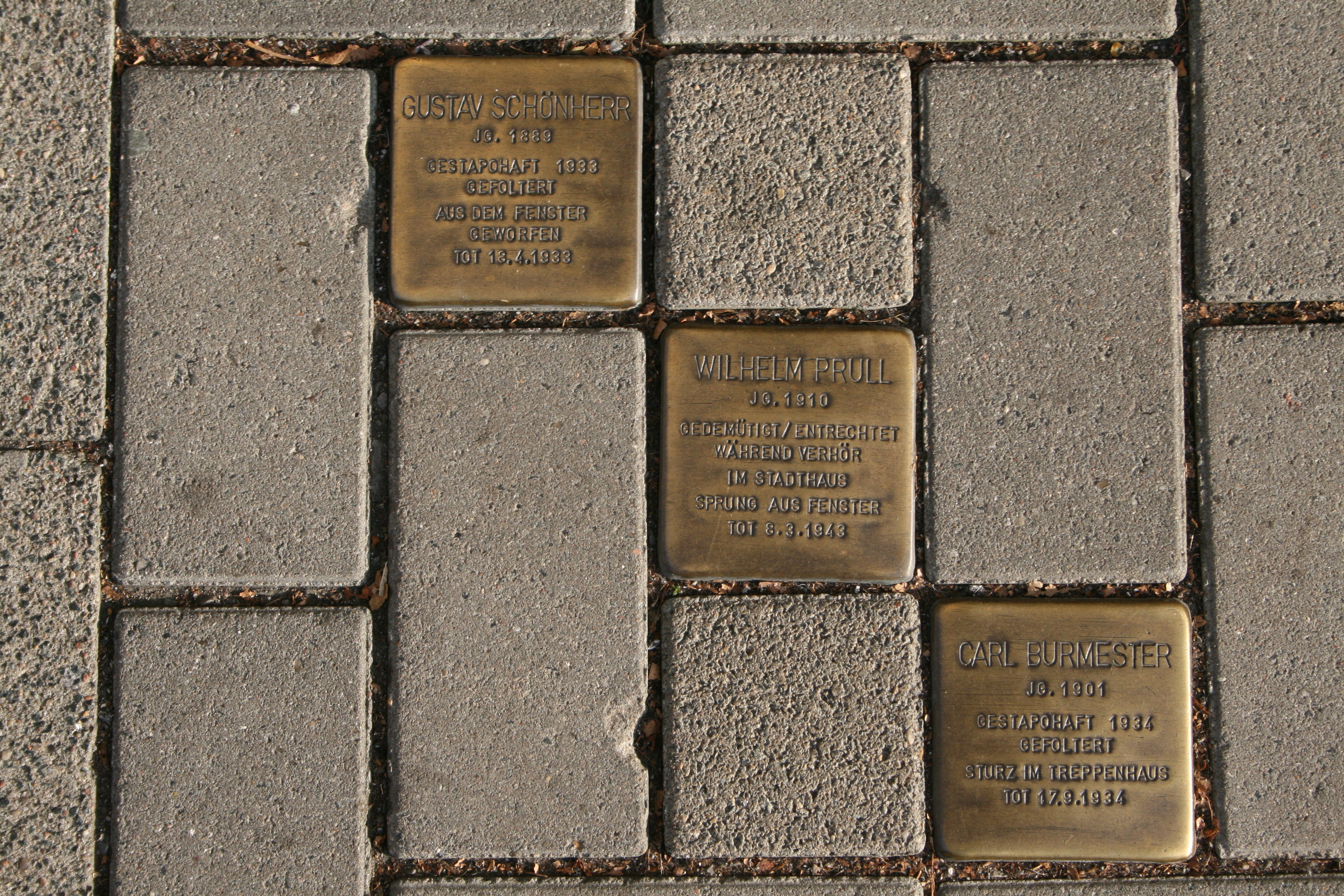
Stumbling stones in front of the Hamburg town hall for the Gestapo victims Gustav Schönherr (1889-1933), Wilhelm Prüll (1910-1943) and Carl Burmester (1901-1934) who died there

The Hamburg police authority had been using the Hamburger Stadthaus as its central office since 1814. During the Weimar Republic and the National Socialist regime, the Hamburg State Police and subsequently the Gestapo were also housed in the extension to the Stadthaus at Stadthausbrücke 8 until 24/25 July 1943, alongside other police departments. After the town hall was destroyed by bombing during Operation Gomorrah following air raids by the Royal Air Force, the office of the State Police Headquarters was temporarily relocated to rooms in the school administration at Dammtorstraße 25. After several weeks, premises in the Civil Justice Building on Sievekingsplatz finally became the headquarters of the State Police Headquarters until the end of the war.

In the town house, prisoners were severely abused by Gestapo employees during interrogations in order to extort confessions. The cellars were used as detention rooms where prisoners were temporarily detained and tortured under inhumane conditions.

The interrogation of the Hamburg KPD functionary, Bürgerschaftsabgeordneten and former leader of the local Red Front fighters' association Etkar André, who was executed in 1936, is documented. It took place on 26 March 1933 in the presence of five other prisoners and the Gauleiter Kaufmann in the Hamburg town hall:

He was first asked if he wanted to testify. When he said no, the goon squad attacked him and beat him up with rubber truncheons. When André was already unconscious on the ground, they kicked him with their feet. Then they pulled him up, laid him over the standing desks, pulled off his pants and beat him with hippopotamus whips and rubber truncheons until his body was nothing but a bloody mass. André was now asked to testify again. However, he could no longer speak and only asked for water. One of the Gestapo officers then took a bottle of water and hit André in the face. He was handed several sheets of paper and told to write down his statements.

— From the indictment against Gauleiter Karl Kaufmann after the end of the war.,

=== Places of detention ===
From March 1933, protective custody prisoners were initially housed in the Hamburg remand prison and in an unused part of the Fuhlsbüttel prison. As the number of people taken into protective custody increased rapidly (1750 protective custody prisoners by May 1933), the newly established Wittmoor concentration camp was filled with prisoners in April 1933. After the closure of this camp in October 1933, the prisoners held there were transferred to the Fuhlsbüttel concentration camp, which was officially designated a concentration camp in September 1933.

From December 1933, the Fuhlsbüttel concentration camp was under the control of the police and was regularly referred to as the Fuhlsbüttel police prison from 1936. The prison staff consisted of Gestapo officers. Prisoners were also tortured there to force confessions.

== Organization ==
Following the reorganization of the German police in the autumn of 1936, the Gestapo was also standardized throughout the Reich: on the one hand, the political police outside Prussia now generally bore the name Geheime Staatspolizei (Secret State Police) and the corresponding police authorities and offices were uniformly named Staatspolizeistellen (State Police Offices) or the State Police Headquarters above them. The Geheimes Staatspolizeiamt in Berlin, which was initially subordinate to the Hauptamt Sicherheitspolizei and from September 1939 was part of the Reichssicherheitshauptamt (RSHA) as Office IV, was in turn the Gestapo headquarters for the state police headquarters within the framework of the reorganized police. Gauleiter Karl Kaufmann took over the "political leadership" of the Hamburg Gestapo and thus exerted considerable influence on this persecuting body.

From the beginning of February 1938, the Gestapo and criminal investigation department in Hamburg had a local Inspekteur der Sicherheitspolizei und des SD (IdS), who in turn was subordinate to the Höherer SS- und Polizeiführer (HSSPF). The first IdS in Wehrkreis X was Bruno Streckenbach. Streckenbach was followed in this function by Erwin Schulz (1940-1941) and Johannes Thiele (1942-1945) followed. In April 1945, the IdS was replaced by a Befehlshaber der Sicherheitspolizei und des SD (BdS), a position held by Walther Bierkamp from 14 April 1945. The locally responsible HSSPF were Hans-Adolf Prützmann (1937-1941), Rudolf Querner (1941-1943) and finally Georg-Henning von Bassewitz-Behr (1943-1945).

The main task of the State Police Headquarters was to investigate and detain opponents of the National Socialist regime or people who were considered to be lawbreakers under National Socialist laws and regulations. For this purpose, the Gestapo was given far-reaching powers to restrict civil liberties, such as Right of association and assembly or postal, correspondence and telecommunications secrecy. In the course of investigations, the Gestapo collected incriminating material in preparation for court proceedings and could order protective custody and executions.

=== Personnel ===
Head of the Hamburg State Police Headquarters until 1 February 1938 was Bruno Streckenbach, who was succeeded by Günter Kuhl in July 1938. On 1 January 1940 Heinrich Seetzen was appointed head of the Hamburg Gestapo, a post he held in absentia from July 1941 to August 1942. In September 1942, Josef Kreuzer took over as head of the Hamburg Gestapo until he was replaced in this position on 1 July 1944 by Hans Wilhelm Blomberg, who remained in this post until the end of the war.

Deputy Gestapo leaders included Ingo Eichmann (1938 to September 1939), Regierungsrat Teesenfitz (until 1943), SS-Sturmbannführer Hintze (temporarily in 1943), Regierungsrat Jacob (until the beginning of 1944) and Regierungsrat Achterberg (probably until the end of the war).

By the end of 1936, more than 200 Gestapo officers were working in Hamburg. In August 1944, the State Police Headquarters employed around 260 male and female Gestapo officers, as well as employees and other personnel. In addition to the prison staff at the Fuhlsbüttel police prison, the Gestapo also provided the guards at the Langer Morgen labor education camp, which had been established in 1943.

During the Second World War, some Hamburg Gestapo officers were also deployed in the German-occupied territories, where they were given tasks in the security police and the SD or the task forces. In German-occupied Denmark in August 1943, for example, 75 Hamburg Gestapo officers set up Gestapo offices to suppress the Danish resistance. The resulting personnel vacancies were filled by the employment office through service obligations. For the most part, the people assigned to Gestapo activities were used for office work or guard duties; only a few took part in investigations or arrests. The mostly older and experienced Gestapo officers remained in leading positions.

=== Branch offices ===
The Hamburg State Police Headquarters in military district (Wehrkreis) X, was the superior authority of various Gestapo branch offices in northern Germany. As part of the Greater Hamburg Act, the former Prussian towns of Altona District, Wandsbek and Harburg-Wilhelmsburg were incorporated into Hamburg from April 1937 and the Gestapo offices there were placed under the control of the Hamburg State Police Headquarters.

There were also branch offices of the Hamburg Gestapo in Hamburg-Bergedorf and Cuxhaven. Furthermore, the branch offices in Düneberg (Sprengstoff A.G.), Krümmel (Dynamitfabrik Krümmel) and Lüneburg Part of the Hamburg state police headquarters.

=== Structure ===
Until 1937, the Hamburg State Police was structured as follows: Subdivisions A to D, which in turn were divided into a total of 15 inspectorates, were subordinate to the head of the department. From 1937 to 1944, the structure of the Hamburg State Police Headquarters changed only insignificantly and was based on the structure of the Secret State Police Office in the Main Office Security Police or, from September 1939, as Department IV in the Reich Main Security Office. There were three departments at the Hamburg State Police Headquarters, each headed by department heads:

- I. Administration with two departments and seven specialist areas
- II. Internal police with eleven departments and at least ten subject areas
- III. Counterintelligence Police with five departments and at least nine subject areas

Organization chart of Department II (internal political police) from 1937 to 1944:

- II A – Communism and Marxism
  - II A 1 Communism
  - II A 2 Marxism
  - II A 3 Hostile foreigners
- II B – Church, emigrants, Freemasons, Judaism, pacifism
  - II B 1 Church matters
  - II B 2 Freemasons, Judaism, pacifism, emigrants
  - II B 3 Passport matters, naturalization and expatriation
- II C Special tasks and assassination matters etc.
- II D Protective custody
- II E Economic policy, agricultural policy and socio-political matters, malice cases, criminal weapons cases, association and assembly matters
  - II E 1 Economic policy matters
  - II E 2 Labor neglect, company sabotage, antisocial working conditions
  - II E 3 Treachery and weapons offenses
  - II E 4 Association and meeting matters
- II F Card index, personnel files, evaluation, reputation matters
- II G Special tasks and assassination matters etc.
- II H Party affairs, official acts by diplomats and consuls, hostile acts against friendly states
- II N Messages
- II P Domestic and foreign press, literature and cultural policy, criminal cases relating to eavesdropping on foreign broadcasters, black listeners
- II Harbor

In January 1944, the Hamburg State Police Headquarters was reorganized once again; for example, departments and subject areas were renamed and in some cases merged or subdivided.

== Development and tracking measures ==
After the dismantling of the organized workers' resistance, the working-class milieu was comprehensively monitored with the help of informants and other informants. In this context, the Hamburg Gestapo cooperated closely with other police departments, Nazi organizations and functionaries (Blockwarte) and authorities. Political emigrants in Northern and Western Europe were also under observation by the Hamburg Gestapo and their exile organizations were infiltrated by V-men. From the mid-1930s, departments of the Hamburg Gestapo not involved in the area of Communism-Marxism intensified their repressive measures against other Nazi victim groups. Occasionally, members of the bourgeois or church opposition were persecuted and their milieus observed. From this point onwards, the Gestapo also stepped up its operations against Jehovah's Witnesses, homosexuals and also so-called asocials. Jews also increasingly became the focus of repressive measures by the state police.

With the beginning of the World War II, the "war within" began and with it an increase in the importance of state police persecution measures. As early as 1 September 1939, potential opponents of the war were arrested in the German Reich and sent to concentration camps. Among those arrested were 53 social democratic and communist workers from Hamburg and Schleswig-Holstein, who were transferred to the Sachsenhausen concentration camp. Gestapo officers gathered information about the mood of the population towards the war and the difficult supply situation caused by the war through their own observations or informants, which was then processed in mood reports. Expressions of opinion that did not conform to the regime or non-conformist behavior often led to arrests, and the Gestapo in Hamburg also took action against swing youths. Of the up to 1500 Hamburg swing youths, more than 400 were arrested and up to 70 of those arrested were later sent to the Moringen concentration camp, the Uckermark concentration camp or the Neuengamme concentration camp.

=== Jewish department ===
The Jewish Department of the Hamburg State Police Headquarters was heavily involved in the persecution of Hamburg's Jews. It was initially part of Department II B 2 and existed as an independent department from 1938. Until 1941, it was housed at the Stadthaus in Düsternstraße, then at Rothenbaumchaussee 38, where the administrative building of the Jewish community had been located until November 1938. From the late summer of 1943, the Jewish Department was located near the St. Pauli Landungsbrücken at Johannisbollwerk 19. The tasks of this department included the surveillance of Jewish institutions and the evaluation of relevant information from other authorities. Gestapo officers from the Jewish Department carried out raids and in some cases arrests in Jewish institutions and were involved in the mistreatment of Jewish citizens. Employees of the Jewish Religious Association Hamburg e. V. (until 1938 Jewish Community of Hamburg) were forced to compile deportation lists.

In addition to officers from the police, Gestapo employees from the Jewish Department were also involved in carrying out the Deportation of Hamburg Jews to concentration and extermination camps. The department was headed by Claus Göttsche from 1941 to 1943, his successor Hans Stephan held the position until the end of the war. From Hannoverscher Bahnhof, 5848 Jews were deported in 17 transports between October 1941 and February 1945, over 5000 of whom became victims of the Holocaust.

=== Department for Foreigners ===
In Hamburg, more than 400,000 people from the countries occupied during the Second World War performed forced labor to compensate for the German workers drafted for military service. The Foreigners Department of the Hamburg State Police Headquarters coordinated the monitoring of forced laborers between the responsible police departments and companies, as sabotage, the formation of resistance groups, rebellion and also relationships between Germans and so-called foreign nationals were to be prevented. From 1942, the Foreigners' Department, headed by Albert Schweim, had around 45 employees who were responsible for forced laborers from individual countries in smaller units. In the more than 1,200 camps for forced laborers, the employees of the Foreigners' Department worked together with the respective camp management and maintained networks of informers. Any known violations of regulations were rigorously prosecuted and could result in executions. The admissions to the Langer Morgen labor education camp were mainly carried out by members of the Foreigners' Department.

In military district X, the foreigners department was also responsible for the officers' camp (Oflag) and Stammlager (Stalag), where those in charge could order executions or carried them out themselves.

=== Persecution of the Hamburg resistance ===
In addition to extensive powers for the state police offices to carry out "special treatments", on 12 June 1942 the head of Office IV in the RSHA Heinrich Müller issued the "Special Decree on Intensified Interrogation" to combat organized resistance. This decree authorized Gestapo officers to severely mistreat suspects who were suspected of refusing to provide information and to extort statements from them, even to their death. This special decree referred exclusively to "Communists, Marxists, Bible Students, terrorists, members of resistance movements, parachute agents, asocials, Polish or Soviet refuseniks". After the decree came into force, the "Special Department 1a1" was set up within the Hamburg Gestapo's "Marxism-Communism" department under Detective Inspector Fritz Knuth in July 1942. In mid-October 1942, the RSHA sent the investigators Horst Kopkow and his colleague Walter Habecker from the Special Commission Red Orchestra to Hamburg, who brought arm and calf clamps as instruments of torture to extort testimony. Employees of the special department also used torture instruments to force confessions. The criminal secretary Henry Helms told a Gestapo employee about the calf clamps that it was "a joy" to see "how people hop and jump".

In order to investigate opponents of the Nazi regime, the Gestapo had to rely on informants from authorities, companies and other police departments. The Gestapo also succeeded in arresting Nazi opponents through denunciators, such as the small group of resistant youths around Helmuth Hübener in February 1942. V-Leute were the Gestapo's most important informants; well-known V-Leute of the Hamburg Gestapo were, for example, Maurice Sachs and Alfons Pannek. Forced to collaborate, the former communist Pannek worked under Helms as an agent provocateur. Pannek, who betrayed hundreds of Hamburg resistance fighters to the Gestapo, ran a reading folder distribution company and a library for cover reasons and even maintained a V-Leute apparatus there with his own secretary.

During the war, the Hamburg Gestapo broke up several resistance groups: In October 1942, the activities of the Bästlein-Jacob-Abshagen Group were uncovered, after which over 100 members of this resistance group were arrested by the Gestapo. Over 70 of the detainees died after their arrest, were executed or murdered by Gestapo agents. After the Bästlein-Jacob-Abshagen group was exposed, the Etter-Rose-Hampel Group was targeted by the Gestapo. This anti-militarist circle of friends of young Nazi opponents, referred to by the Gestapo as a "group of people without a criminal record", was broken up and most of its members were tried and executed. In the fall of 1943, the Gestapo began investigating the activities of the Hamburg White Rose. From November 1943 to March 1944, 30 people associated with the group were arrested, eight of whom did not live to see the liberation from National Socialism. Finally, in March 1945, the Gestapo persecuted the resistance group Kampf dem Faschismus (KdF), several of its members were murdered by order of the Gestapo shortly before the end of the war.

As part of Aktion Gewitter, a few weeks after the failed assassination attempt of 20 July 1944 on Adolf Hitler in Hamburg, eleven Social Democratic politicians and the former Communist member of parliament Antonie Schmidt were arrested by the Gestapo and taken into protective custody.

=== End of the war ===
In the event of an invasion of Hamburg by Allied troops, the Higher SS and Police Leader Georg-Henning von Bassewitz-Behr, the head of the Hamburg criminal investigation department Johannes Thiele, and the Hamburg Gestapo chief Josef Kreuzer had already made preparations in the spring of 1944 for the Evacuation of the Fuhlsbüttel police prison, as these prisoners were not to be liberated by Allied troops. After further consultation with senior Gestapo officials, three lists were drawn up at the beginning of 1945: One list contained the names of those prisoners who were to be released and another listed the prisoners to be "evacuated", who had to start the death march to the Nordmark labor education camp in Kiel-Hassee on 12 April. A third list contained 71 prisoners who were to be executed and who were murdered during the Crimes of the final phase in Neuengamme concentration camp.

From 14 to 18 April 1945, prisoners had to transport incriminating material from the SS and police stations to the remand prison and burn it in the boiler house there. Card indexes, files, interrogation protocols, personnel records and other documents were also burned with petrol at Wallgraben near Sievekingsplatz. The Gestapo employees were ordered to go into hiding and join the Werwolf. The Gestapo informers were ordered to leave Hamburg temporarily.

== Post-war period, reappraisal and remembrance ==
After the end of the war, the Hamburg police were immediately denazified by the British military administration. Since the Gestapo employees were considered to be members of a Criminal Organization, investigators of the British occupation authorities tried to determine the whereabouts of this group of people for the purpose of arrest and internment.

The former Gestapo chief Seetzen and the Jewish consultant Göttsche committed suicide when they were arrested. Others, such as Streckenbach and the former head of the Fahndungskommando Kraus, were taken prisoner of war by the Soviets. While Kraus died as a Soviet prisoner of war, Streckenbach returned to Hamburg in 1955 and lived in his hometown for the rest of his life, unmolested by the law. The former heads of the Gestapo Kreuzer, Blomberg and Kuhl were convicted of crimes against Allied citizens by British military tribunals: Blomberg and Kuhl were executed and Kreuzer received a life sentence. The former commandant of the Fuhlsbüttel police prison Willi Tessmann was also sentenced to death by a British military court and executed, while his predecessor Johannes Rode died in British internment.

By 1946, 340 members of the Hamburg Gestapo had been taken into custody and around 40 were still on the run. The Hamburg Committee of Former Political Prisoners worked with the Allied agencies involved in the prosecution of war crimes and the corresponding trial preparations. The Hamburg Chief Public Prosecutor's Office, which was investigating crimes committed by Germans against Germans, also asked the committee for support in its investigations. This committee helped, among other things, by providing incriminating documents in the preliminary investigations for the Neuengamme main trial and the trials involving crimes in the Fuhlsbüttel police prison, which took place as part of the Curiohaus trials.

The best-known trial against Hamburg Gestapo collaborators took place from 9 May to 2 June 1949 before the jury court at the Hamburg Regional Court and is also known as the Helms trial after the main defendant. This trial was conducted against twelve Gestapo collaborators and informers of the Marxism-Communism Department for crimes against humanity, among other things. In addition to Helms and Pannek, the accused also included three female defendants who had worked as Gestapo employees or undercover agents. The subject matter of the proceedings included mistreatment resulting in death, extortion of testimony, deprivation of liberty, concentration camp incarcerations, the execution of 71 prisoners of the Fuhlsbüttel police prison in April 1945, denunciations, spying and the embezzlement of valuables from arrested persons. On 2 June 1949 the court handed down the sentences: Pannek was sentenced to twelve years imprisonment and Helms to nine years. Furthermore, seven prison sentences of between one and four years were imposed. The three female defendants were acquitted. The Supreme Court of the British Zone examined the appeals on 5 September 1950. The verdict against Pannek, who had been sentenced to twelve years in prison at first instance for his activities as an informer for the Gestapo and the resulting consequences for the victims, did not become legally binding after the cassation and was later dropped for formal reasons. The applications for appeal by Helms and another defendant were not granted. Pannek was released from prison immediately and Helms prematurely in November 1953.

By May 1950, over 1,300 officers had been dismissed from the police service in Hamburg as part of the denazification process, including Gestapo officers. However, a number of them were taken back into the Hamburg police service as so-called 131s. It is not certain whether this also applied to Gestapo officers in Hamburg; at least Ingo Eichmann and Walter Abraham, for example, tried unsuccessfully to be reinstated in the Hamburg police force.

A comprehensive study of the Hamburg Gestapo is still not available today, as the documents of the state police headquarters were also burned during the destruction of the Stadthaus in July 1943 and further incriminating material was destroyed towards the end of the war. Relevant publications only deal with the Hamburg Gestapo in passing or only cover a limited period or section.

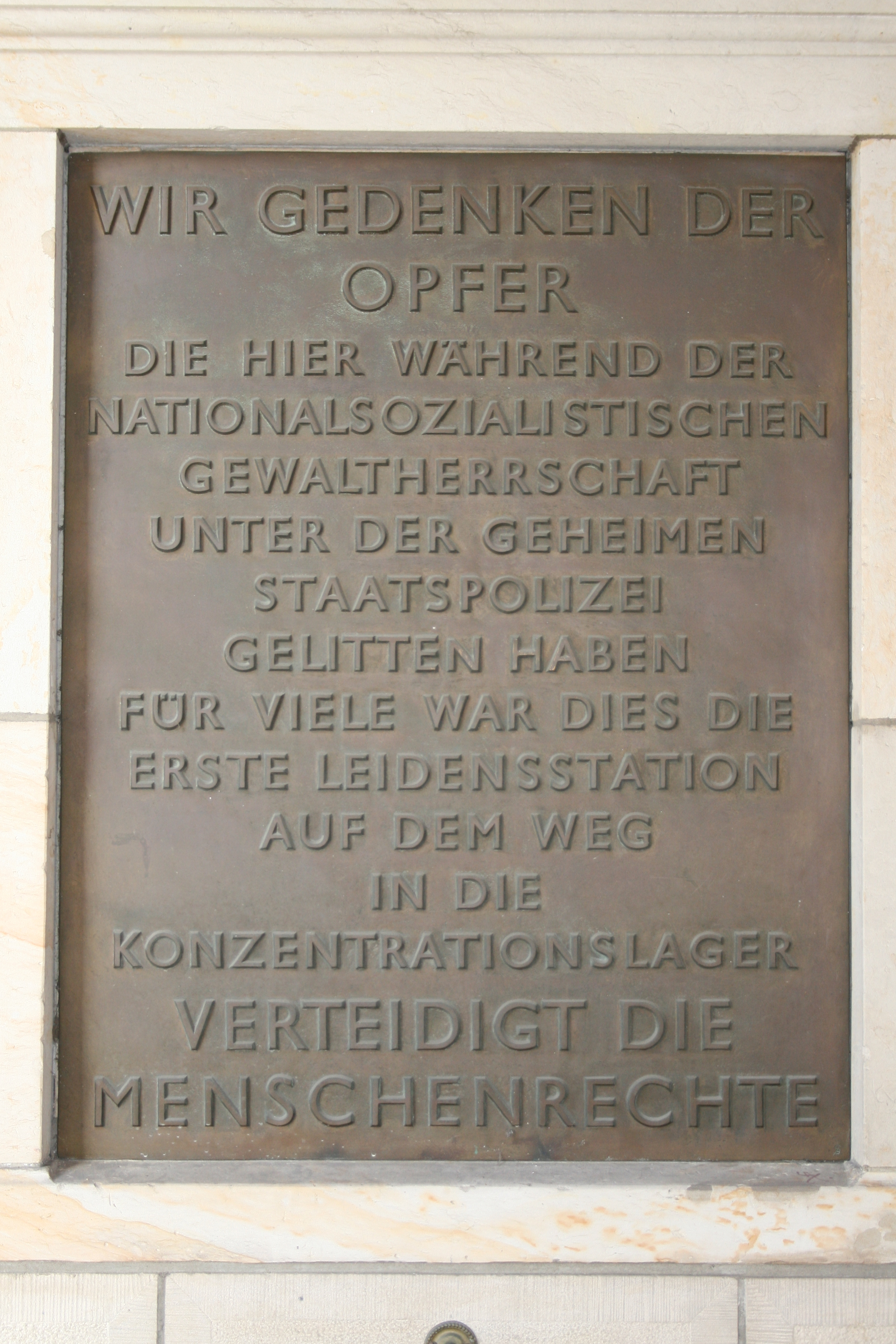
Memorial plaque for the Gestapo victims at the entrance to the Hamburg City Hall.

The former Gestapo headquarters at Stadthausbrücke 8 was used by the Hamburg Building Authority, among others, after the end of the war. Until 1980, there was no evidence of the building's use under National Socialism. In 1980, employees of the building authority appealed for donations and published the brochure "Dokumentation Stadthaus in Hamburg. Gestapo Headquarters from 1933 to 1943" to place a memorial plaque for the victims of the Gestapo at the main entrance to the building. This suggestion was implemented in 1984. In 2008 and 2009, three stumbling stones were laid in front of the main entrance to the Department for Urban Development and the Environment at Stadthausbrücke 8 in memory of three men who died in the Gestapo headquarters.

The Hamburg Senate decided to sell the Stadthaus to a private investor in 2009. As part of the Hamburg Senate's "Overall Concept for Places of Remembrance of the National Socialist Era 1933-1945 in Hamburg" published in 2009, it was determined that the investor would establish a documentation site in the Stadthaus to commemorate the victims of police violence. In preparation for the establishment of a corresponding memorial, employees of the Neuengamme Concentration Camp Memorial sifted through historical material and initiated the exhibition Documentation Stadthaus. The Hamburg Police under National Socialism with an extensive accompanying program, which was on display in Hamburg City Hall from 19 January to 10 February 2012.

== Literature ==
- Herbert Diercks, Christine Eckel, Detlef Garbe (Hrsg.): Das Stadthaus und die Hamburger Polizei im Nationalsozialismus. Katalog der Ausstellungen am Geschichtsort Stadthaus, Metropol Verlag Berlin 2021, ISBN 978-3-86331-573-3.
- Herbert Diercks: Dokumentation Stadthaus. Die Hamburger Polizei im Nationalsozialismus. Texte, Fotos, Dokumente. KZ-Gedenkstätte Neuengamme, Hamburg 2012, (Digitalisat).
- Herbert Diercks: Die Freiheit lebt. Widerstand und Verfolgung in Hamburg 1933–1945. Texte, Fotos und Dokumente. Published by the Neuengamme Concentration Camp Memorial on the occasion of the exhibition of the same name at Hamburg City Hall from January 22 to February 14, 2010. Neuengamme Concentration Camp Memorial, Hamburg 2010.
- Herbert Diercks: Gedenkbuch „Kola-Fu“. Für die Opfer aus dem Konzentrationslager, Gestapogefängnis und KZ-Außenlager Fuhlsbüttel. KZ-Gedenkstätte Neuengamme, Hamburg 1987.
- Ludwig Eiber: Unter Führung des NSDAP-Gauleiters. Die Hamburger Staatspolizei (1933–1937). In: Gerhard Paul, Klaus-Michael Mallmann (Hrsg.): Die Gestapo. Mythos und Realität. Wissenschaftliche Buchgesellschaft, Darmstadt 1995, ISBN 3-534-12572-X.
- Ursel Hochmuth, Gertrud Meyer: Streiflichter aus dem Hamburger Widerstand. 1933–1945. 2. Auflage. Röderberg-Verlag, Frankfurt 1980, ISBN 3-87682-036-7.
- Gertrud Meyer: Nacht über Hamburg. Berichte und Dokumente 1933–1945. Bibliothek des Widerstandes, Röderberg-Verlag, Frankfurt am Main 1971.
- Public Services, Transport and Traffic Union, Hamburg District Administration, Hamburg District Administration: Dokumentation Stadthaus in Hamburg: Gestapo-Hauptquartier von 1933 bis 1943. Wartenberg, Hamburg 1981.
- Linde Apel, in cooperation with the Research Center for Contemporary History in Hamburg and the Neuengamme Concentration Camp Memorial (ed.): In den Tod geschickt – Die Deportationen von Juden, Roma und Sinti aus Hamburg, 1940 bis 1945. Metropol Verlag, Hamburg 2009, ISBN 978-3-940938-30-5.
- Working Group of Formerly Persecuted Social Democrats (ed.): Wegweiser zu den Stätten von Verfolgung und sozialdemokratischem Widerstand in Hamburg. Teil I: Die innere Stadt. (PDF; 1,6 MB) Hamburg 2005 (retrieved on April 29, 2012 Linde Apel, Frank Bajohr: Die Deportation von Juden sowie Sinti und Roma vom Hannoverschen Bahnhof in Hamburg 1940–1945. In: Research Center for Contemporary History in Hamburg: Zeitgeschichte in Hamburg 2004. Hamburg 2005, p. 21–63, zeitgeschichte-hamburg.de (PDF)
