= Heinrich Baab =

Gestapo chief of Frankfurt

Heinrich Baab (27 July 1908 – 23 May 2001) was a secretary and Gestapo chief of Frankfurt at the Lindenstraße station. The Gestapo (Secret State Police) was the official secret police of Nazi Germany and German-occupied Europe. After the war in Europe ended, Heinrich Baab received a sentence of life imprisonment in March 1950 for his involvement in the Final Solution as the head of Division IIB2. He was imprisoned from 1948 to 1973. On 6 April 1950 he was convicted of murdering 55 Jews from 1938 to 1943 and the attempted murders of 21 Jews, as well as for maltreatment of 29 Jewish prisoners in Frankfurt. His trial was five weeks long, with 157 witnesses testifying, including some of his victims. Heinrich Baab sent many of Frankfurt's Jews to camps from the rail station. Baab's supervisor at the Lindenstrasse station was Oswald Poche. Before joining the police in 1928 in Stettin, Baab was a locksmith. Heinrich Baab's SS membership number was 306631 and his Nazi Party number was 1346669.

Hermann Schramm, a German tenor who sang at the Frankfurt Opera, was a witness to the arrest of a Jewish woman caught with a tramway ticket in her handbag - evidence of her using public transport. Schramm attempted to intervene and was repeatedly struck in the face by Baab, but not arrested himself. Hermann Schramm testified against Baab at his trial.

The Baab trial in Frankfurt was described by American journalist Kay Boyle in an article in The New Yorker, later also published as an introduction to her story collection The Smoking Mountain.

Baab served his sentence at Butzbach Prison. In clemency petitions, he portrayed himself as a victim who had gotten caught up in the Holocaust and was only a minor perpetrator. In 1972, Baab was granted clemency and released from prison. He died in 2001.
