= Gaston Allard =

French botanist and entomologist (1838–1918)

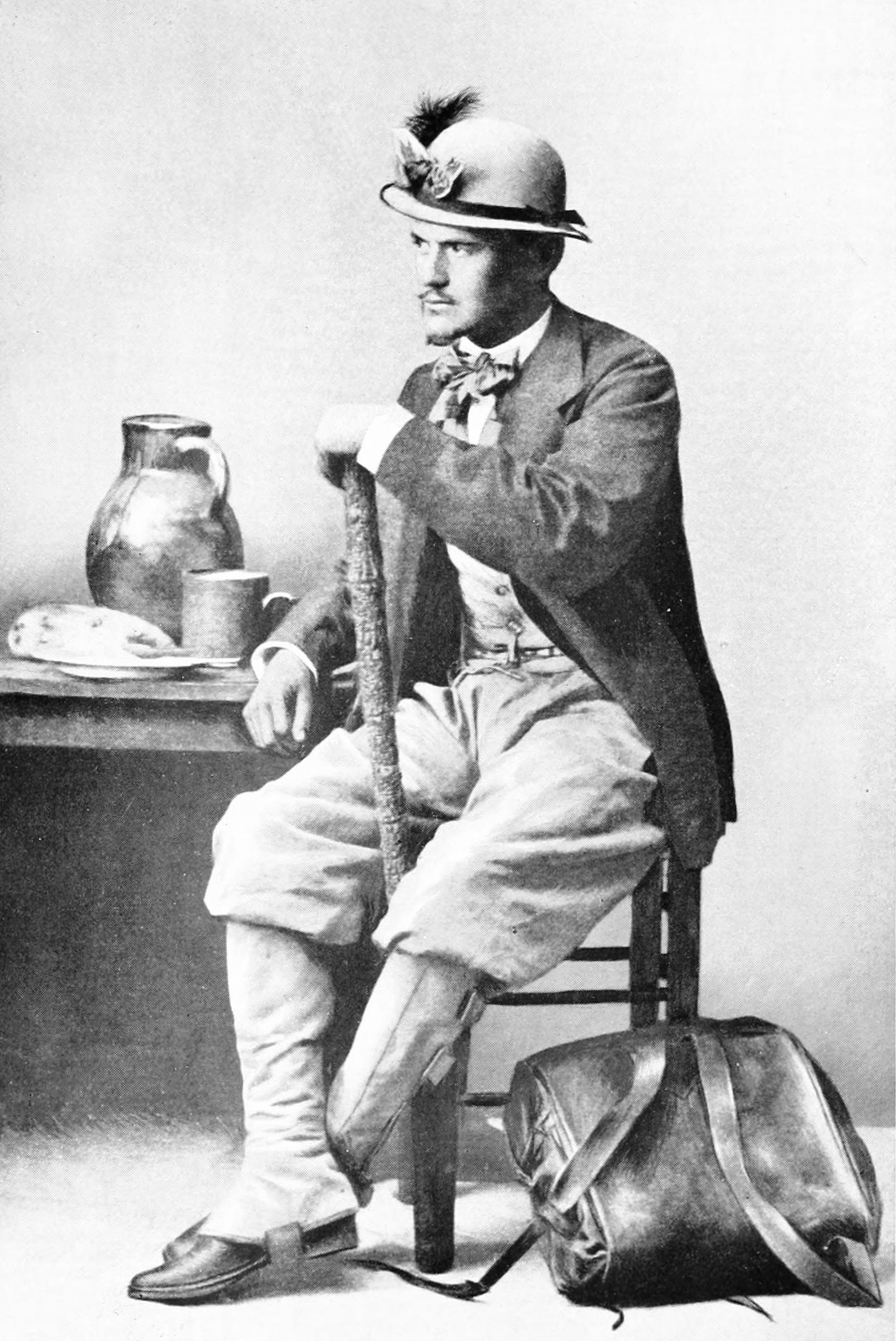
- Gaston Allard, 1863
- Born: 14 April 1838; Angers
- Died: 5 January 1918 (aged 79); Angers
- Occupation(s): Botanist, entomologist

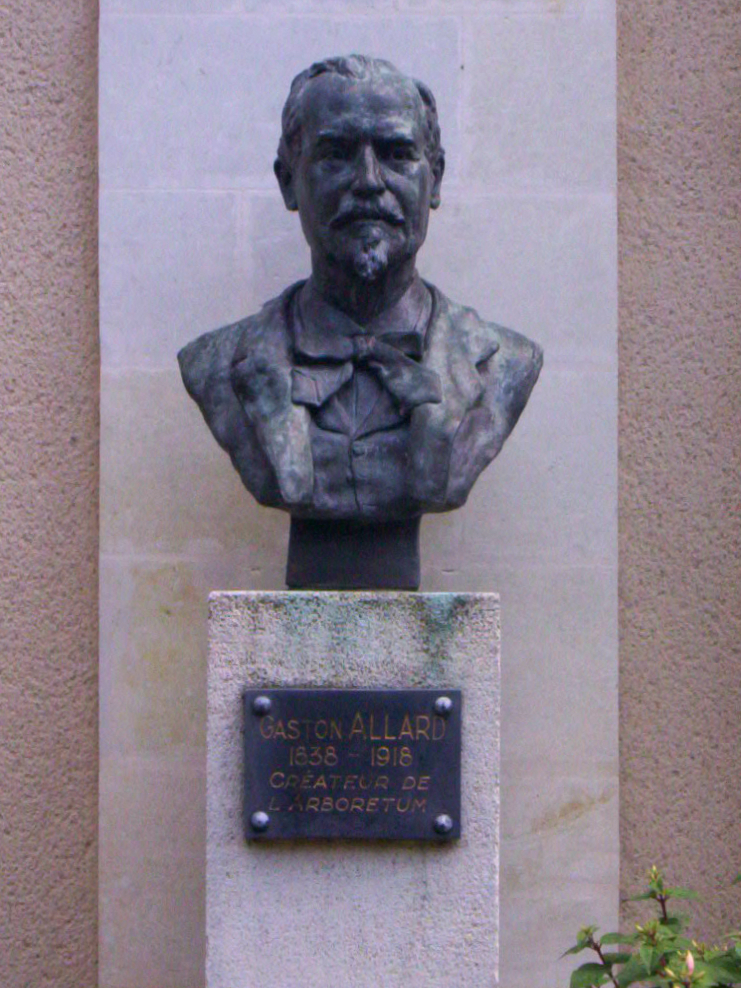
Bust of Gaston Allard, from The Arboretum Gaston Allard.

Gaston Isidore Allard (14 April 1838 – 5 January 1918) was a French botanist, entomologist, and founder of The Arboretum Gaston Allard.

== Biography ==
Allard was born on 14 April 1838. After attending high school, Allard studied under Alexandre Boreau, the director of the jardin des plantes d'Angers.

In 1863, Allard became a member of the Société entomologique de France and voyaged to Algeria, Spain, and Portugal to study Lepidoptera and the regional flora. In 1867, he described the species Kretania martini in Algeria.

After the death of his father, he inherited the family estate and developed the gardens. In 1875, he began to collect oak and conifer trees. He received support from local plant nurseries, and he received seeds and plants from all over the world. In 1885, he dedicated a polyantha rose variant to his father-in-law, named the 'Daniel Lacombe'. By 1907, his arboretum contained 2,000 species, including 250 conifers, 125 oaks, and 1,500 shrubs.

From 1892 to 1918, Allard served as a member of the city council of Angers. He was placed in charge of the city's gardens, including the redevelopment of the jardin des plantes d'Angers and of the Jardin du Mail. In 1916, Allard donated his arboretum to the Pasteur Institute. He remained as director.

Allard died on 5 January 1918 in Angers. The botanist Louis Blaringhem, his colleague from the Pasteur Institute, succeeded Allard as arboretum director. His property later became the Muséum des sciences naturelles d'Angers.
