= Alexandre Boreau =

French pharmacist and botanist (1803–1875)

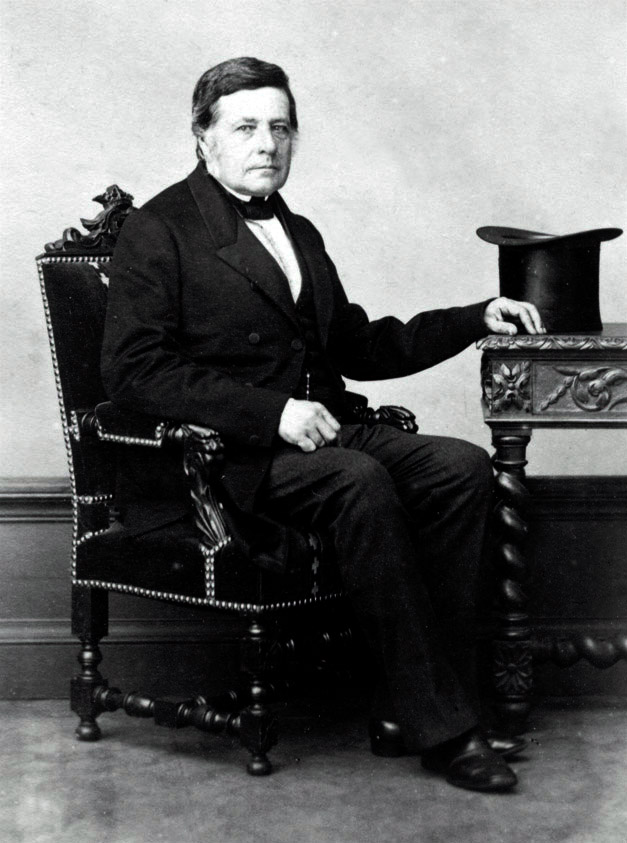
- Alexandre Boreau
- Born: March 15, 1803; Saumur, Maine-et-Loire, France
- Died: May 5, 1875 (aged 72); France
- Known for: Flore du Centre de la France (1840)
- Spouse: Antoinette Morin (m. 1828)
- Scientific career
- Fields: Botany, Pharmacy
- Author abbrev. (botany): Boreau

Alexandre Boreau (March 15, 1803 – May 5, 1875) was a French pharmacist and botanist. He is the binomial authority of plants such as Polygonum arenastrum and Pulmonaria longifolia. The standard author abbreviation Boreau is used to indicate this person as the author when citing a botanical name.

== Biography ==
Boreau was born in Saumur, in the department of Maine-et-Loire on March 15, 1803. His father was a laborer, and upon his father's death, Boreau worked at baths established on the quay of the Loire, upstream of the Cessart bridge. Still a boy, Boreau came under the protection of his godfather Abel Aubert du Petit-Thouars, an admiral. Boreau was able to study humanities at the college of Saumur. In 1820, he began training to be a pharmacist while working in a dispensary in Angers. Within the framework of these studies, he developed an interest in botany, and he enrolled in courses and studied at the jardin des plantes d'Angers.

After his marriage to Antoinette Morin, in 1828, he opened a dispensary in Nevers. He devoted himself to botany and research. He collaborated with Count Jaubert, Minister of Louis Philippe, who shared Boreau's passion for botany. A plant discovered in Central Asia is dedicated to him, the Boreava orientalis.

In 1840, Boreau published the first edition of his Flore du Centre de la France (Flora of Central France), a model of precision which becomes a noted reference book at the time (2nd edition in 1849, 3rd in 1857). He kept busy at his town botanical garden, reorganizing the classifications and assisting in giving public courses. He published many works, in particular within the framework of the Academic Company of Maine-et-Loire.

Upon his death on May 5, 1875, his widow Antoinette Morin established a herbarium in his memory. It was later bought by the local government and today maintained in the house of Gaston Allard.
