= Arboretum Gaston Allard =

Arboretum in Maine-et-Loire, Pays de la Loire, France

Coordinates: 47.4510°N 0.5425°W

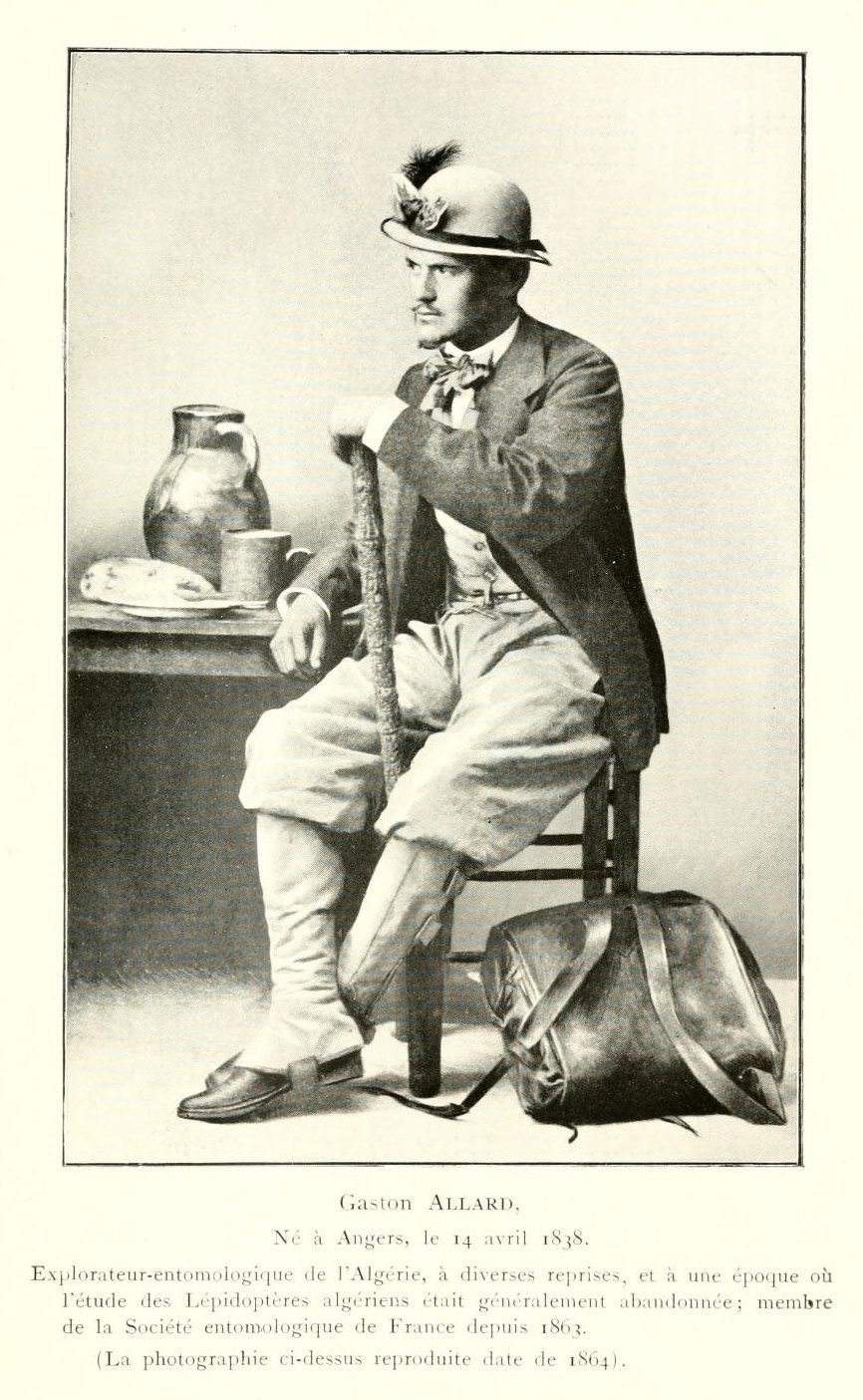
Gaston Allard

The Arboretum Gaston Allard (7 hectares), also known as the Arboretum d'Angers and formerly the Arboretum de la Maulévrie, is a municipal arboretum located at 9, rue du Château d'Orgement, Angers, Maine-et-Loire, Pays de la Loire, France. It is open daily.

The arboretum was begun in 1863 by botanist Gaston Allard (1838-1918) within the closerie Maulévrie, which was then his home. He continued planting until his death in 1918. The property was ceded to the city in 1960, and his former home now houses the Botany Department of the Museum of Natural Sciences of Angers.

Today the arboreum contains an excellent collection of trees: approximately 4,300 specimens represent 1,600 taxa, including 705 taxa of conifers and 50 of oaks, with notable specimens of Quercus variabilis, Pseudocydonia sinensis, and Tilia mongolica. In 1980 the arboretum was augmented with a national collection of hydrangeas, which now contains approximately 750 taxa. Three new gardens have been added: a shade garden (2000 m²), test garden (4000 m²), and garden of the five senses (1200 m²). All told these gardens contain about 20,000 plants.

The arboretum also contains a major herbarium of more than 350,000 specimens dating from the 19th and 20th centuries.

== See also ==
- List of botanical gardens in France
