= Renée de Vendômois =

French noblewoman and convicted assassin in the late 15th century

Renée de Vendômois was a French noblewoman in the late 15th century. In 1486, she was condemned for adultery, theft, and complicity in the murder of her husband, Jean de Saint-Berthevin, the lord of Souday. Initially sentenced to be burned at the stake, her punishment was commuted by King Charles VIII to perpetual reclusion. She confessed her involvement in her husband's murder and spent the rest of her life confined in a small cell as an recluse at Saints-Innocents Cemetery in Paris.

== Biography ==
Renée de Vendômois was married in 1478 as a young woman of 16 years of age to the French nobleman Jean de Saint-Berthevin. He had been married before with two children from his first marriage and was more than 40 years old at the time of his second marriage. A wealthy man, Jean de Saint-Berthevin and Renée received the nobility of the country. Thus, the young woman met and eventually fell in love with a squire, Guillaume du Plessis, who presented himself as a distant cousin. His frequent presence and the disappearance of large sums of money eventually aroused the husband's suspicion. Renée claimed that these suspicions were unfair and that the thefts were the fault of the servants, but Jean de Saint-Berthevin ended up surprising the lovers.

After attempting to poison the husband, although without success, Guillaume du Plessis and Renée de Vendômois ordered a former servant to assassinate the husband. Jean de Saint-Berthevin was killed shortly before Christmas 1483, and soon public rumor indicated Guillaume du Plessis as the author of the crime and the accomplice of Renée de Vendômois. He had written a letter to her to recommend that she watch carefully over her words and not let any confession escape in the event of interrogation. Du Plessis then hurried to reach Saint-Malo, which was a town of franchise. A criminal could not enjoy the privilege of immunity in Saint-Malo unless he first made his confession in writing without omitting the smallest detail. Wanting to avoid the noose, du Plessis therefore confessed everything: his guilt, Renée's complicity and the circumstances of the murder. Eventually, du Plessis moved to Burgundy, and married into a noble family without ever being tried for the murder of Jean de Saint-Berthevin.

After the tutors of her former husband's children had accused Renée, she was arrested, held as prisoner at the Conciergerie and tried on 2 May 1485 before the Prévôt of Paris. As she did not confess to her crime, she was transferred from the prisons of the Conciergerie to those of the Châtelet, in order to subject her to further questioning. She was tortured several times, probably with an instrument called boots. While wooden wedges, struck by the mallet of the boots, bruised her legs and made her bones crack with great suffering, an impassive clerk stood at his desk, ready to record her cries of pain and confession. She was found guilty of adultery, theft, and complicity in the murder of her husband and sentenced to be burned at the stake.

After two years of court procedures and upon a plea for commutation of the sentence by the Duke of Orléans, King Charles VIII commuted her sentence to perpetual reclusion. As a result, she spent the remainder of her life as a recluse confined in a small cell at the cemetery of the Holy Innocents in Paris.

This form of punishment involved complete isolation from society. She would have lived in very basic and confined conditions, with minimal contact with the outside world. Her daily life would have been marked by solitude, reflection, and religious contemplation, as such punishments often aimed to encourage repentance.

== Reception ==
The life of Renée de Vendômois and events concerning her trial and punishment were recorded by the historian Ambroise Ledru in his 1892 biography La recluse Renée de Vendômois. In his studies of the history of his native region Maine in Northern France, he had searched archives and earlier accounts of the events surrounding Renée de Vendômois and compiled them for the first time in this story.

In their 2021 book Les grandes oubliées: pourquoi l'histoire a effacé les femmes (The Great Forgotten Ones: Why History has erased Women), French journalists Titiou Lecoq and Michelle Perrot mentioned Renée de Vendômois as an example of women forgotten by mainstream history.

== Literature ==
- McDougall, Sara (2016). "Fictions and Lies: Accusations of Spousal Homicide and Adultery in France.". In Kavey, Allison; Ketner, Elizabeth (eds.). Imagining Early Modern Histories. London: Ashgate. pp. 215–36. doi:10.4324/9781315562728. ISBN 9781315562728.
