= Archives du Féminisme =

Archives du Féminisme (Archives of Feminism) is a French non-profit organization established in 2000 whose main objective is to preserve feminist historical sources. The associated collection, also named Archives du féminisme, is published by the Rennes University Press and promotes the spread of research and findings concerning women's liberation movements. Christine Bard is the president.

== Activity ==
The association collects historical documents from various associations, holds colloquia and study days, and produces publications. It provides online resources, including articles and reports, bibliographies, historical sources, exhibitions (in partnership with MUSEA) as well as a "Guide of sources", a database of sources pertaining to French feminist history.

== Partnerships ==
The Centre des archives du féminisme (CAF) in co-operation with the Bibliothèque Marguerite Durand welcomes funds collected by the Archives du Féminisme association. Established in 2000, the CAF is integrated, as a specialised fund, into the University of Angers library. It comprises private archive funds covering the period from the 19th to the 21st century.

== Publications ==
Archives du Féminisme has two organs of information: a website and a news bulletin.

The Guide to Feminist Historical Sources, compiled under the direction of Christine Bard, Annie Metz and Valérie Neveu, which indexes and describes collections of archival materials related to feminism, throughout France, was published six years after the creation of the association, in 2006. Born of the observation that the search for sources on feminism was difficult because of the fragmentation of these sources and the obscurity of their locations, this guide lists feminist resources for researchers and is divided into four parts: "public archive services", "private associations, libraries, museums and archive centres", "audiovisual sources" and "webography." Work on updating this guide is proposed on the association's site in the section "source guide." This section includes approximately 369 index cards on feminist resource centres, their locations and their contents.

In February 2017, the Dictionary of Feminists in France, 18th-21st century, a project supervised by Christine Bard with the co-operation of Sylvie Chaperon, was released. Two hundred collaborators participated in drafting and preparing this work, which offers 550 biographies of people who made history in the feminist movement.

== Bibliography ==
- Bard, Christine; Metz, Annie; Neveu, Valérie (2006). Guide des sources de l'histoire du féminisme. Archives du féminisme. Rennes: Presses Universitaires de Rennes. ISBN 2-7535-0271-4.
- Bard, Christine; Chaperon, Sylvie (2017). Dictionnaire des féministes. France – XVIIIe–XXIe siècle. Hors collection. Rennes: Presses Universitaires de Rennes. ISBN 978-2-13-078720-4.
