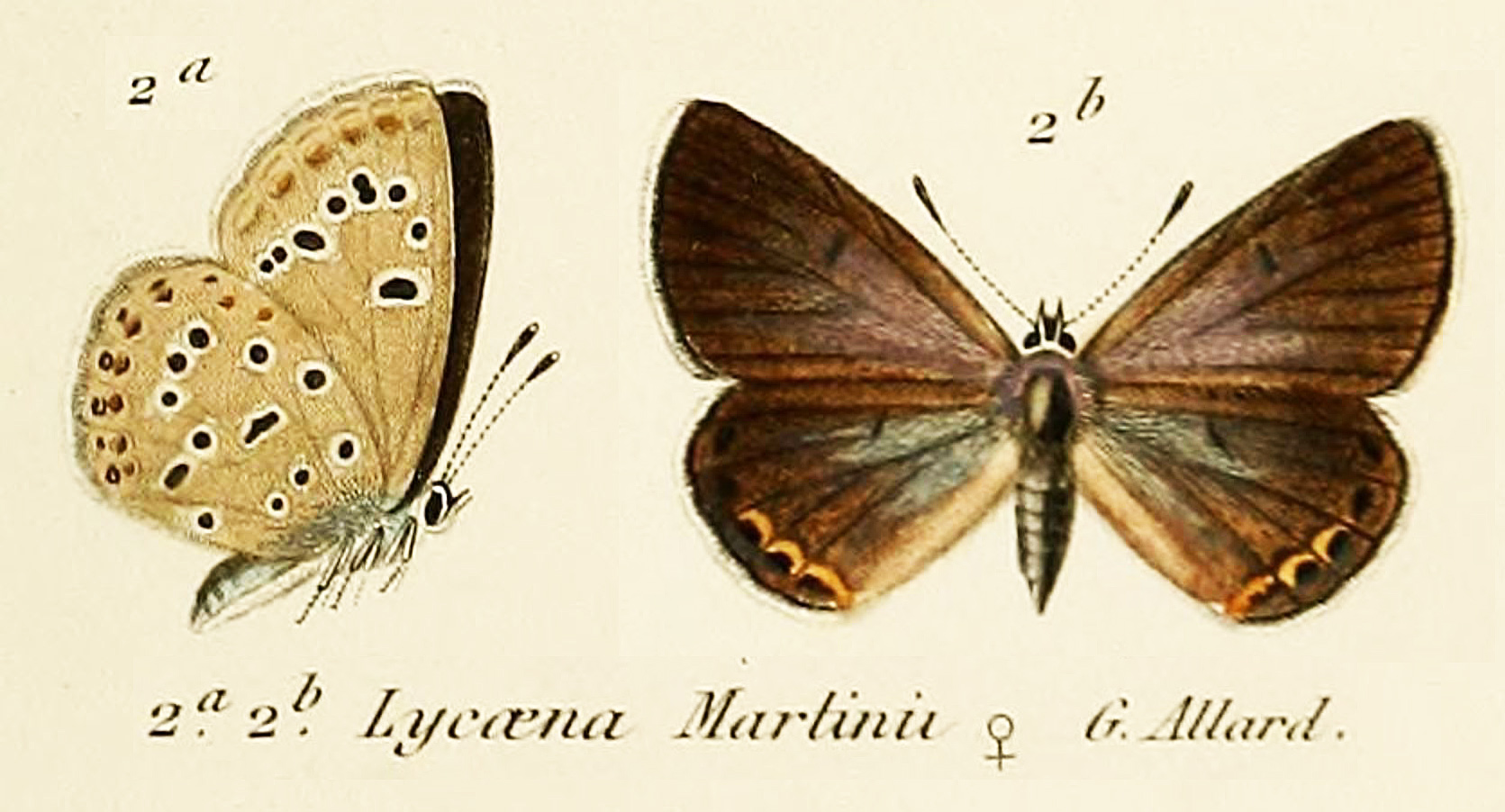

Scientific classification
- Kingdom: Animalia
- Phylum: Arthropoda
- Clade: Pancrustacea
- Class: Insecta
- Order: Lepidoptera
- Family: Lycaenidae
- Genus: Kretania
- Species: K. martini

Binomial name
- Kretania martini (Allard, 1867)

Synonyms
- Lycaena martini Allard, 1867; Plebejus martini (Allard, 1867)

= Kretania martini =

Species of butterfly

Kretania martini, or Martin's blue, is a species of North African butterfly in the family Lycaenidae and the subfamily Polyommatinae.

== Systematics ==
The species was first described by French entomologist Gaston Allard in 1867. He initially named the species Lycaena martini. The type specimen was from Lambaesis, in Algeria.

The species was placed in the genus Plebejus, and the subgenus Plebejides, but was later moved to the genus Kretania, along with other species placed in Plebejides.

== Subspecies ==
Several subspecies have been described.

- Kretania martini martini (Allard, 1867) — from Algeria
- Kretania martini ungemachi (Rothschild, 1926) — from the High Atlas and the Middle Atlas mountains of Morocco
- Kretania martini mgouna (Tarrier, 2002) — from the M'Goun mountain in Morocco
- Kretania martini regularis (Tennent, 1995) — from the Rif region of Morocco

== Description ==
The imago of the species is a small butterfly which is sexually dimorphic. The top of the male is blue purple with a thin black border and a white fringe, while that of the female is dark brown with a blue basal suffusion, white fringe, and a series of orange submarginal half moons and black marginal spots on the hindwings.

The underside of the wings is beige gray decorated with black spots circled in white, with a series of orange submarginal half moons bordered by black and white chevrons, and a series of black marginal spots.

The ornamentation resembles a similar species, Kretania allardii.

== Biology ==
=== Phenology ===
The species emerges from May to late June.

=== Host plants ===
Plants that host the species include Astragalus massiliensis and Acanthyllis numidia for K. m. martini, Astragalus incanus incurvus for K. m. ungemachi and Astragalus armatus for K. m. regularis. Astragalus alopecuroides and Astragalus nemorosus also host the species. The caterpillars exist in myrmecophily with ants from the genus Crematogaster.

== Distribution ==
The species is present in Northern Africa, specifically Morocco and in northern Algeria.

It prefers fairly dry and flowery open environments, generally between 1,000 and 2,100 m above sea level.

== Conservation ==
In Morocco, the subspecies Kretania martini ungemachi is considered vulnerable, and the subspecies K. m. regularis and K. m. mgouna endangered.
