= Terra Botanica =

Amusement and botanical park in Angers, France

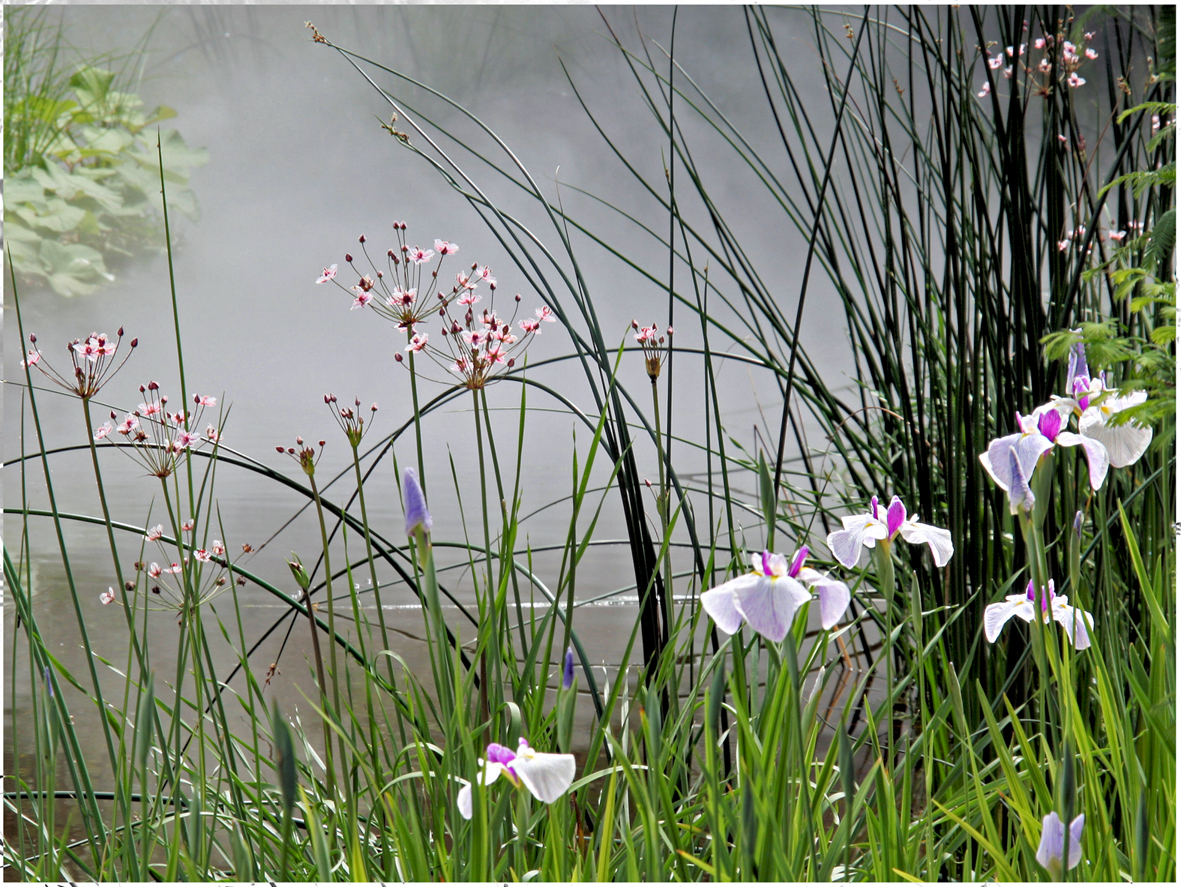
- Interactive map of Terra Botanica
- Location: Angers, France
- Coordinates: 47°30′04″N 0°34′12″W
- Opened: April 2010
- Website: Main site

Terra Botanica is an amusement and botanical park in Angers that contains 500,000 plants from across the world.

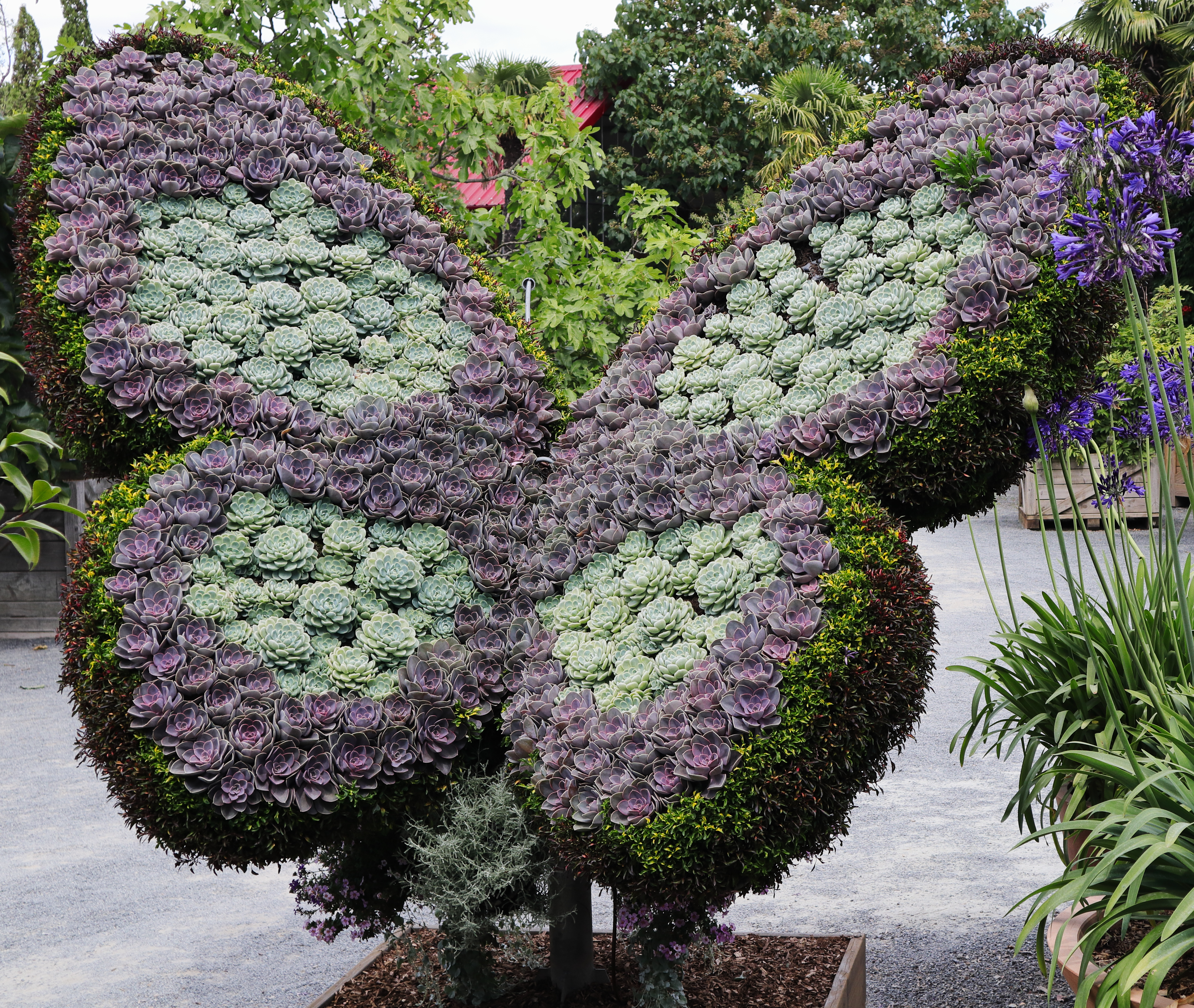

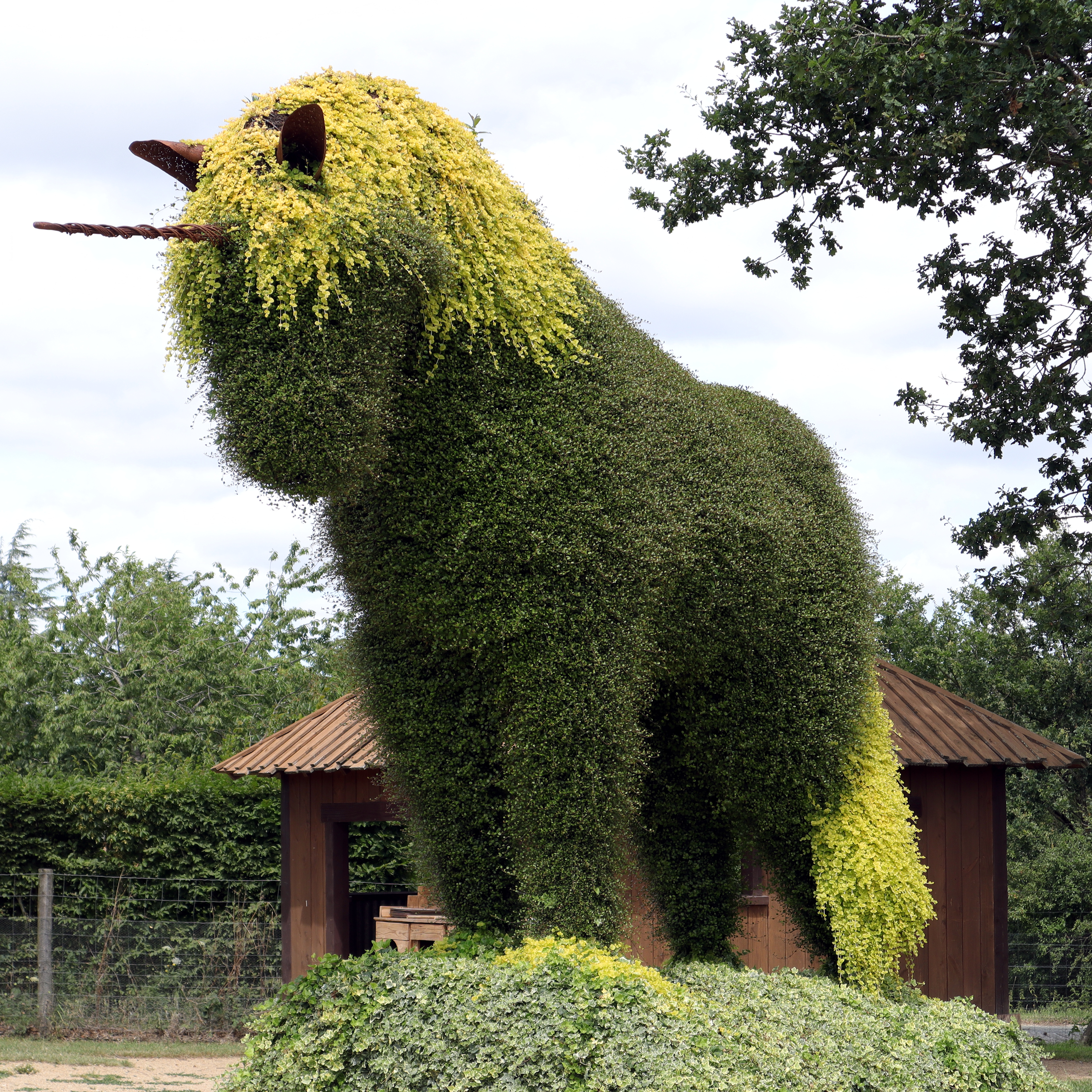

== See also ==
- Jardin botanique de la Faculté de Pharmacie d'Angers
- Jardin des Plantes d'Angers
- List of botanical gardens in France
