= Jardin botanique de la Faculté de Pharmacie d'Angers =

Botanical garden and arboretum in Pays de la Loire, France

Coordinates: 47.4800°N 0.5584°W

The Jardin botanique de la Faculté de Pharmacie d'Angers (8000 m²) is a botanical garden and arboretum operated by the Faculty of Pharmacy of the University of Angers. It is located at 16 Boulevard Daviers, Angers, Maine-et-Loire, Pays de la Loire, France, and open weekdays without charge.

The garden was created from 1888-1895 via gradual transfer of the existing School of Botany collection from the Jardin des Plantes d'Angers. It was designed as two major sections of 4000 m² each, with a walkway between; one contains the systematic collection and a small, heated greenhouse (100 m²), with the other containing the arboretum. About 2000 plants in the garden are set out within 32 beds according to the early Bentham & Hooker system of classification. The garden has undergone only minor changes since its inception.

Today the garden contains about 2,200 species (2,700 taxa) as follows: systematic plant collection (2,000 taxa), trees and shrubs (315 taxa), greenhouse plants (250 species), useful and medicinal plants (175 taxa), and aromatic and spice plants (22 species).

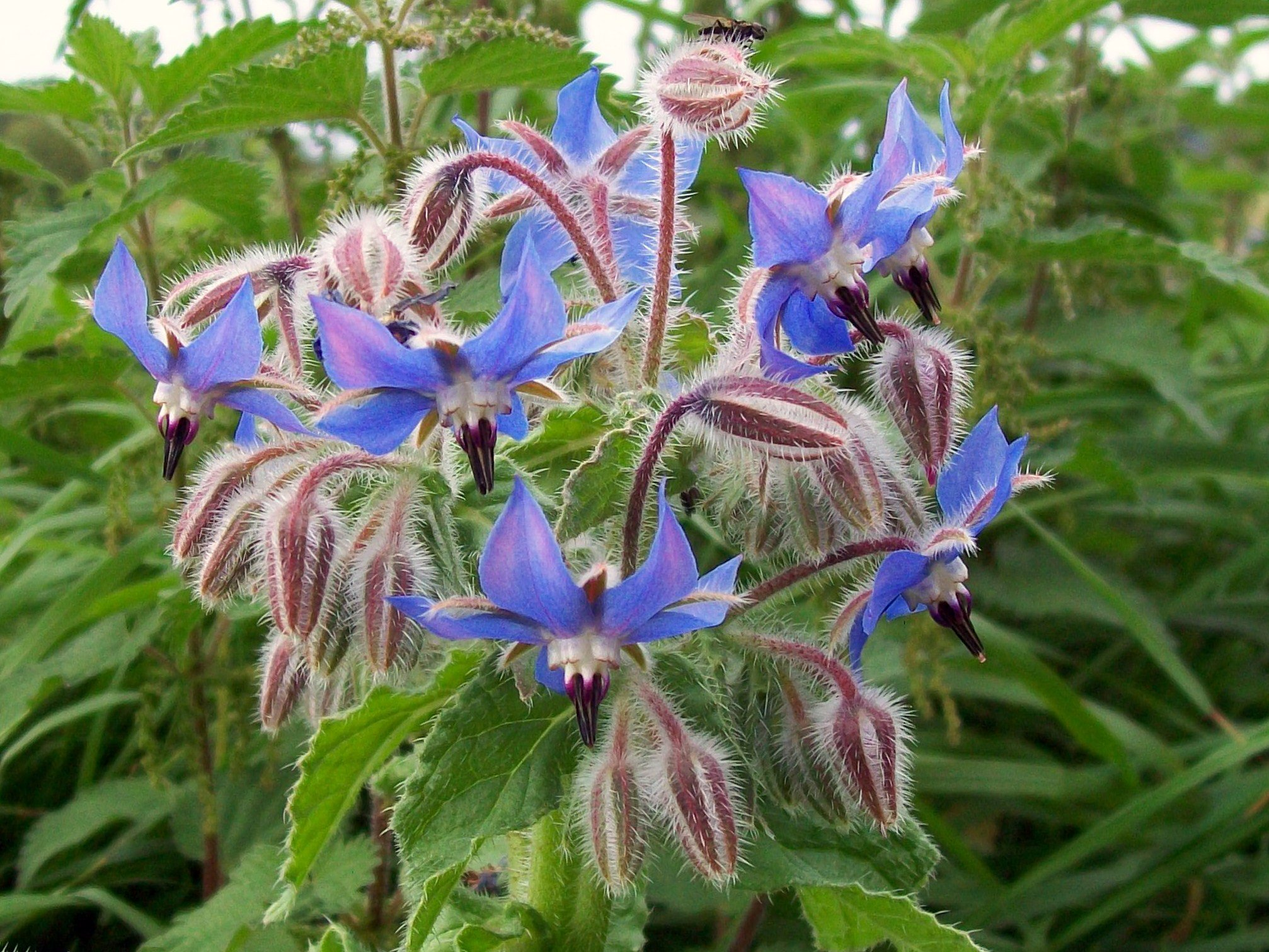
Jardin botanique de la Faculté de Pharmacie d'Angers

== See also ==
- Jardin des Plantes d'Angers
- List of botanical gardens in France
- Terra Botanica
