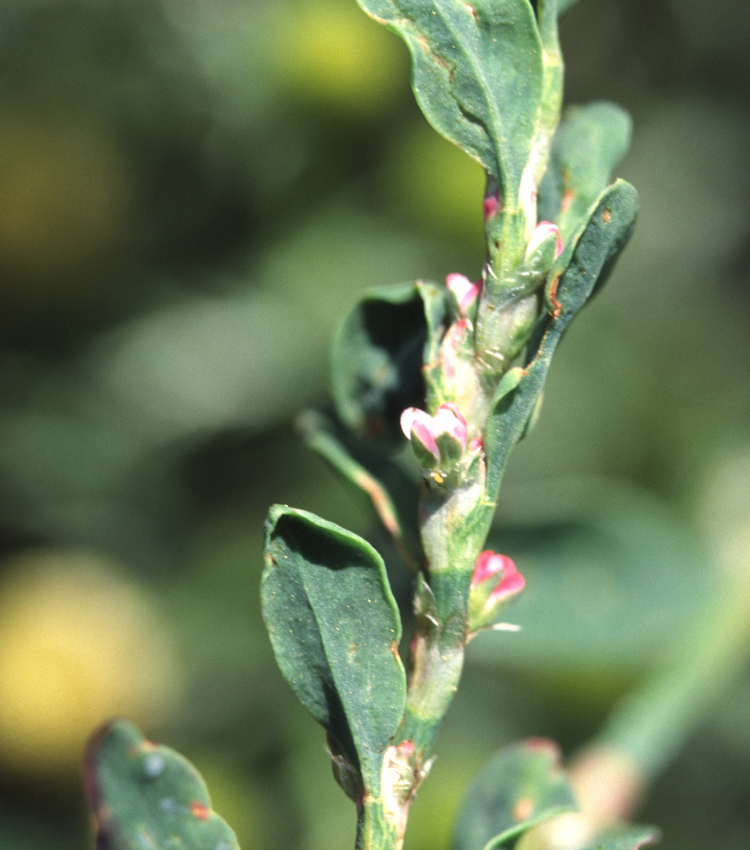

Scientific classification
- Kingdom: Plantae
- Clade: Tracheophytes
- Clade: Angiosperms
- Clade: Eudicots
- Order: Caryophyllales
- Family: Polygonaceae
- Genus: Polygonum
- Species: P. arenastrum

Binomial name
- Polygonum arenastrum Boreau

Synonyms
- List: Centinodia microsperma (Jord. ex Boreau) Fourr.; Polygonum acetosellum Klokov ex Kom.; Polygonum aequale Lindm.; Polygonum aequale subvar. parvulum Moss; Polygonum arenastrum subsp. calcatum (Lindm.) Wissk.; Polygonum arenastrum var. depressum (Meisn.) Franco & Rocha Afonso; Polygonum arenastrum subsp. microspermum (Jord. ex Boreau) H.Scholz; Polygonum arenastrum var. microspermum (Jord. ex Boreau) Franco & Rocha Afonso; Polygonum aviculare subsp. aequale (Lindm.) Asch. & Graebn.; Polygonum aviculare var. arenastrum (Boreau) Nyman; Polygonum aviculare subsp. calcatum (Lindm.) Thell.; Polygonum aviculare var. calcatum (Lindm.) Hyl.; Polygonum aviculare subsp. depressum (Meisn.) Arcang.; Polygonum aviculare var. depressum Meisn.; Polygonum aviculare subsp. microspermum (Jord. ex Boreau) Berher; Polygonum aviculare var. microspermum (Jord. ex Boreau) St.-Lag.; Polygonum aviculare proles microspermum (Jord. ex Boreau) Rouy; Polygonum berteroi Phil.; Polygonum calcatum Lindm.; Polygonum depressum (Meisn.) Longo; Polygonum ebracteatum Munshi & Javeid; Polygonum lencoranicum Kom.; Polygonum maritimum J.Rémy; Polygonum microspermum Jord. ex Boreau; Polygonum montereyense Brenckle; Polygonum parvulum (Moss) P.D.Sell; Polygonum planum Skvortsov; Polygonum propinquum Ledeb.; Polygonum prostratum Skvortsov; Polygonum pycnophyllum Gand.; Polygonum sparsiflorum Vorosch.; Polygonum suifunense Vorosch. & N.S.Pavlova

= Polygonum arenastrum =

Plant species in the knotweed family

Polygonum arenastrum, commonly known as equal-leaved knotgrass, is a summer annual flowering plant in the knotweed family Polygonaceae. Other common names include common knotweed, prostrate knotweed, mat grass, oval-leaf knotweed, stone grass, wiregrass, and door weed, as well as many others. It is native to Eurasia and can be found on other continents as an introduced species and a common noxious weed. Knotweed was first seen in North America in 1809 and is now seen across much of the United States and Canada.

== Description ==
Knotweed develops a deep tap root (it can be as deep as 18 in (46 cm)), does well in compacted soil, and survives drought conditions. The numerous wiry stems grow out from the center of the plant giving it a mat-like appearance. The stems are very long and branching and grow in a zigzag form. The leaves are alternate, oblong, hairless, can be 1/2 to 2 1/2 inches (12 to 37 mm) long, and are bluish-green in color. The leaf stalk is short and closely surrounded by papery stipules on each node. The stem nodes are slightly swollen and look somewhat like "knots", thus its common name, knotweed. Flowers, with colors ranging from white to green, are inconspicuous, have no petals, and grow all along the stems. The sepals, however, are pinkish with white edges. Seeds are egg-shaped, dark reddish brown in color, and have a smooth shiny surface.

In the US, knotweed can be mistaken for the native plant spotted spurge. An easy way to tell the difference is to break off a stem. Spurges contain milky sap; knotweed does not.

Since common knotweed does well in compacted soils, it is commonly found in brown-field sites, roadsides and pavements, driveways and in turf grass (where there is a lot of footpath wear) and in gardens.

=== Germination and spread ===
Common knotweed germinates at or near the soil surface in early spring, as soon there is enough moisture, and grows in an upright position before it spreads out like a mat. If mowed, it will still spread and can form a mat as wide as 3 to 4 ft (0.9 to 1.2 m) in diameter. The seeds, which grow low to the ground, survive mowing and are not disturbed when stepped on by people and animals.

Knotweed is a weed of waste areas but has been showing up in grain fields, where is becomes problematic because of its prolific seed production and long viability. It is also a host for powdery mildew like Erysiphe betae and viruses such as beet ringspot and beet curly top virus.

== Taxonomy ==
In 1857 the botanist Alexandre Boreau described a new species in the Polygonum genus, which he named Polygonum arenastrum. In 1881 Carl Fredrik Nyman described it as a variety named Polygonum aviculare var. arenastrum. Some sources treat Polygonum arenastrum as a subspecies or variety of Polygonum aviculare, while others differentiate. According to Plants of the World Online it is an accepted species. There are 18 species names that are heterotypic synonyms.

Table of Synonyms
Name	Year	Notes
Centinodia microsperma (Jord. ex Boreau) Fourr.	1869	
Polygonum acetosellum Klokov ex Kom.	1936	
Polygonum aequale Lindm.	1912	
Polygonum berteroi Phil.	1858	
Polygonum calcatum Lindm.	1904	
Polygonum depressum (Meisn.) Longo	1901	
Polygonum ebracteatum Munshi & Javeid	1986	
Polygonum lencoranicum Kom.	1936	
Polygonum maritimum J.Rémy	1849	nom. illeg. homonym. post.
Polygonum microspermum Jord. ex Boreau	1857	
Polygonum montereyense Brenckle	1942	
Polygonum parvulum (Moss) P.D.Sell	2018	
Polygonum planum Skvortsov	1943	
Polygonum propinquum Ledeb.	1850	
Polygonum prostratum Skvortsov	1943	nom. illeg. homonym. post.
Polygonum pycnophyllum Gand.	1882	
Polygonum sparsiflorum Vorosch.	1967	
Polygonum suifunense Vorosch. & N.S.Pavlova	1967	

== Eradication ==
In the home garden, common knotweed is easy to get rid of by hand pulling. Covering garden beds with landscaping fabric and then mulch is a good way to keep knotweed from taking over. If the seeds do germinate in the mulch cover, they are easy to remove. Herbicides are also an option. Pre-emergent herbicides, those that prevent the seed from germinating, are effective, but the area must first be free of weeds for this type of herbicide to work. Post emergent herbicides, those that kill the growing plant by spraying the green leaves of the plant, may be effective if applied when the plant is very young.

To prevent this weed, the soil should be aerated and well-drained. Young weeds should be pulled before they set seed.
