= Christine Bard =

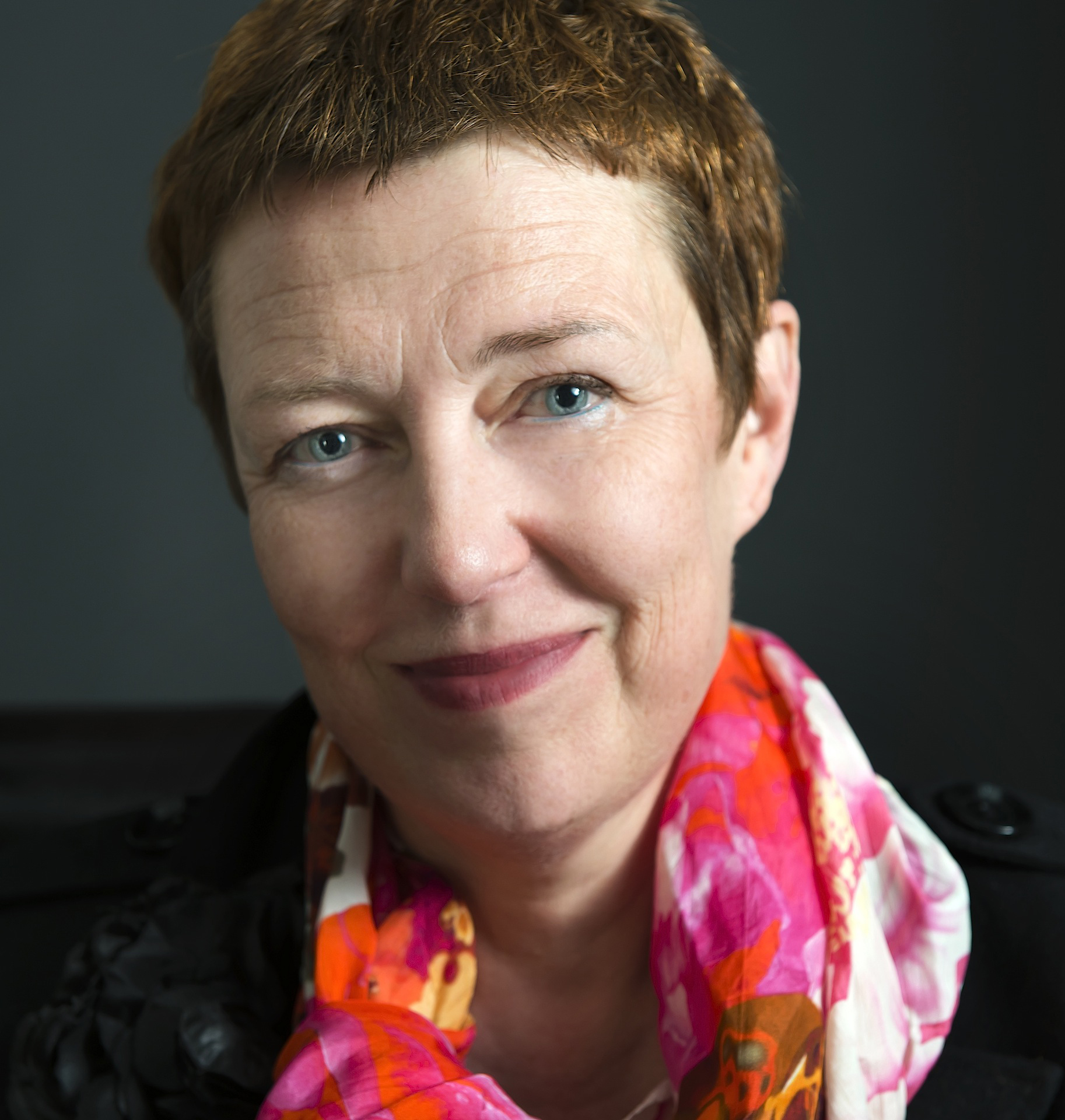
Christine Bard in 2016

Christine Bard (born 1965) is a French historian and author who specialises in women's history, feminism, antifeminism and gender. She is professor of Contemporary history at the University of Angers, a member of the TEMOS laboratory and senior member of the Institut Universitaire de France. She is notable for establishing the "Archives du Féminisme" at the Presses University in Rennes and also for creating the first virtual museum of women's history in France, Musea, a site published by the University of Angers.

== Early life and studies ==
Born in Jeumont, Bard studied history at Lille-III University. She then studied the history of feminism in France between 1914 and 1940 at Paris 7 University. Her thesis there was later published under the title Les Filles de Marianne: histoire des féminismes 1914–1940.

== Career ==
In 1995, Bard became a lecturer in contemporary history at the University of Angers. She gradually worked from junior to senior lecturer to professor. Bard is a member of the TEMOS CNRS FRE laboratory and senior member of the Institut Universitaire de France. In 2000, she founded the centre for the Archives of Feminism association, which she chairs. The association collects archives of feminist associations and activists. In 2004, she also created Musea, a virtual museum of women's and gender history, published by the University of Angers. She designed the exhibition: Masculine women. Bard also writes on antifeminism. In 2018, she was a visiting professor at New York University.

In 2023, the Institut français d'opinion publique (IFOP) was asked to conduct a survey on the place and role of women in history in French school education. The survey took place at the time of the publication of the pocket edition of 'Les Grandes Oubliées' (The Great Forgotten Ones) by Titiou Lecoq. Seventy percent of the people questioned in the survey thought that school education in France did not accord enough importance to women in history. To support the inclusion of women in history textbooks and to support teachers and parents who think this inclusion is important, Lecoq pointed to the work of Bard in creating and directing the Archives du féminisme, a home set up in 2000 for previously privately held feminist archives, and in starting the virtual museum Musea. Both resources support the research, materials creation and examples necessary to improve the teaching of women in history in French schools. Bard also plans for a Museum of Feminisms to be based in Angers, France within a few years.

== Awards ==
In 2007, Bard gained the US Barbara Kanner Prize for scholarly excellence in bibliographical work for Guide to Sources of the History of Feminism.

On July 10, 2015 she became a Knight of the Order of Academic Palms.

== Publications ==
- Les Filles de Marianne. Histoire des féminismes. 1914–1940, Paris, Fayard, 1995.
- Les Garçonnes. Modes et fantasmes des Années folles, Paris, Flammarion, 1998. (The Flappers. Fashions and fantasies of the Roaring Twenties)
- Les Femmes dans la société française au XX^{e} siècle, Paris, Armand Colin, 2001, 2^{e} édition revue, 2003, traduit en allemand : Die Frauen in der französischen Gesellschaft des 20. Jahrhunderts, Bonn, Böhlau Verlag, 2008.
- Ce que soulève la jupe – Identités, transgressions, résistances, Autrement, 2010, traduit en suédois. (What the skirt raises – Identities, transgressions, resistances)
- Une histoire politique du pantalon, Le Seuil, 2010, édition augmentée avec un post-scriptum en Points Seuil, 2014. Traduit en espagnol, en turc et en russe. (A political history of trousers)
- Le féminisme au-delà des idées reçues, Le Cavalier bleu, 2012. (Feminism beyond preconceived ideas)
- Les insoumises. La révolution féministe, Le Monde, Collection Les Rebelles, 2013. (The Unsubmissive Women. The Feminist Revolution) 2021 (ISBN 978-2-7467-6287-9 et 2-7467-6287-0, OCLC 1275244246, lire en ligne [archive]).
- L'histoire traverse nos peaux douces, livre 1 : Jack, Éditions iXe, 2022. (History runs through our soft skin)
- Édition critique par Christine Bard concernant Madeleine Pelletier, Mémoires d’une féministe intégrale, Paris, Gallimard, « Folio histoire », 2024.
- Les premières femmes au Gouvernement (France, 1936– 1981). Histoire@Politique (in French). 1: 2. doi:10.3917/hp.001.0002. 2007

== Exhibitions ==
- Visages du suffragisme français, (Faces of French Suffragism), a virtual exhibition on Musea (with Valérie Neveu), online since ^{December} 1 , 2007.
- Femmes au masculin, (Masculine Women), a virtual exhibition on Musea, since March 8, 2005.
