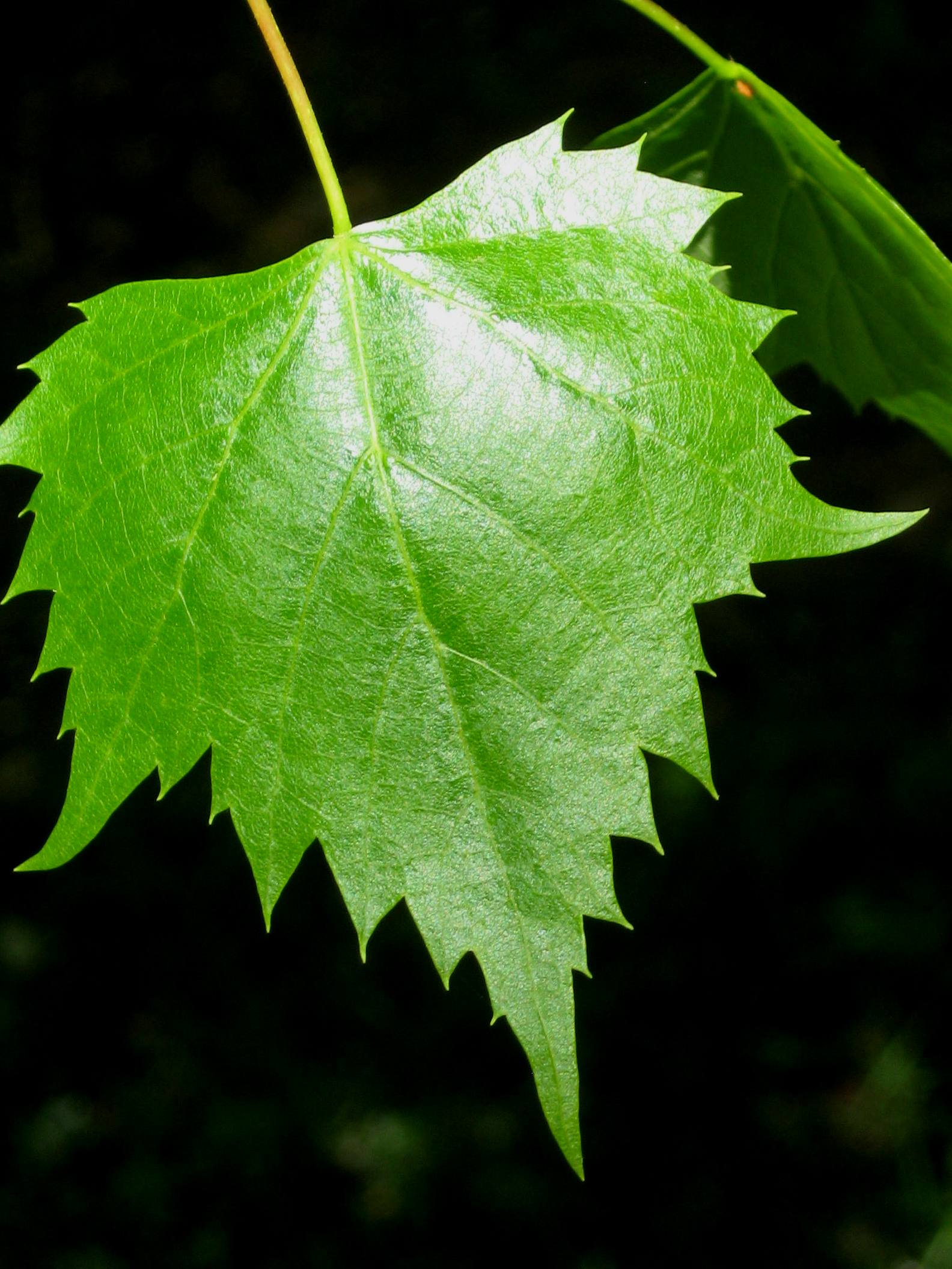
- Mongolian lime leaf

Scientific classification
- Kingdom: Plantae
- Clade: Tracheophytes
- Clade: Angiosperms
- Clade: Eudicots
- Clade: Rosids
- Order: Malvales
- Family: Malvaceae
- Genus: Tilia
- Species: T. mongolica

Binomial name
- Tilia mongolica Maxim.

= Tilia mongolica =

Species of tree

Tilia mongolica Maxim., commonly known as Mongolian lime, is a tree native to mountains of the northern China, growing up to elevations of 1200–2200 m.

== Description ==
Mongolian lime is a small slow-growing deciduous tree of rounded, compact habit, usually reaching < 10 m in height. The dense, twiggy growth and glabrous reddish shoots bear leaves 4–7.5 cm long, typically coarsely toothed with 3–5 lobes, superficially resembling ivy or maple leaves. The emergent leaves are bronze, turning glossy green in summer, and bright yellow in autumn. The greenish-white flowers are borne in clusters of 6–20 in June and July.

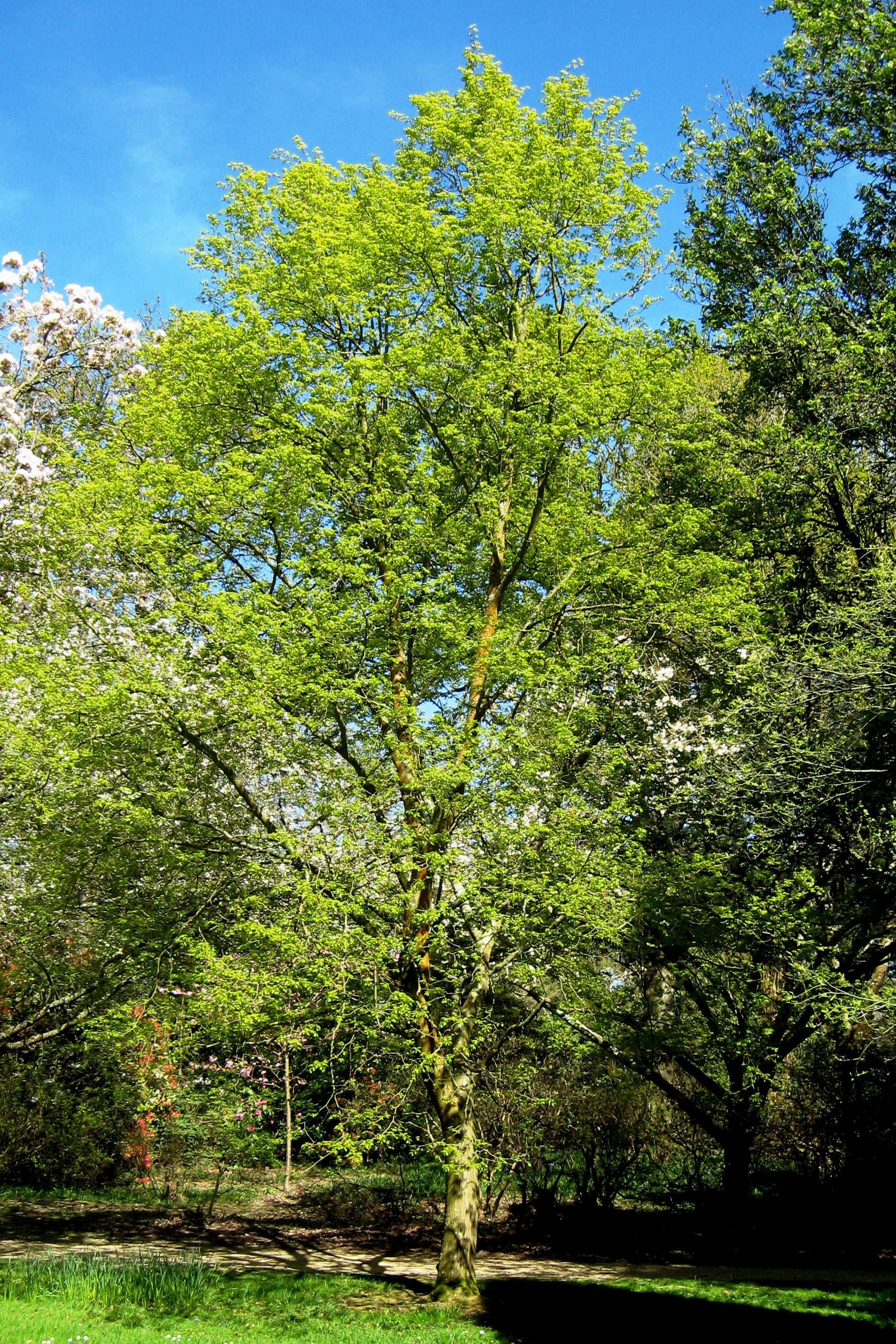
Mongolian Lime at Exbury, UK

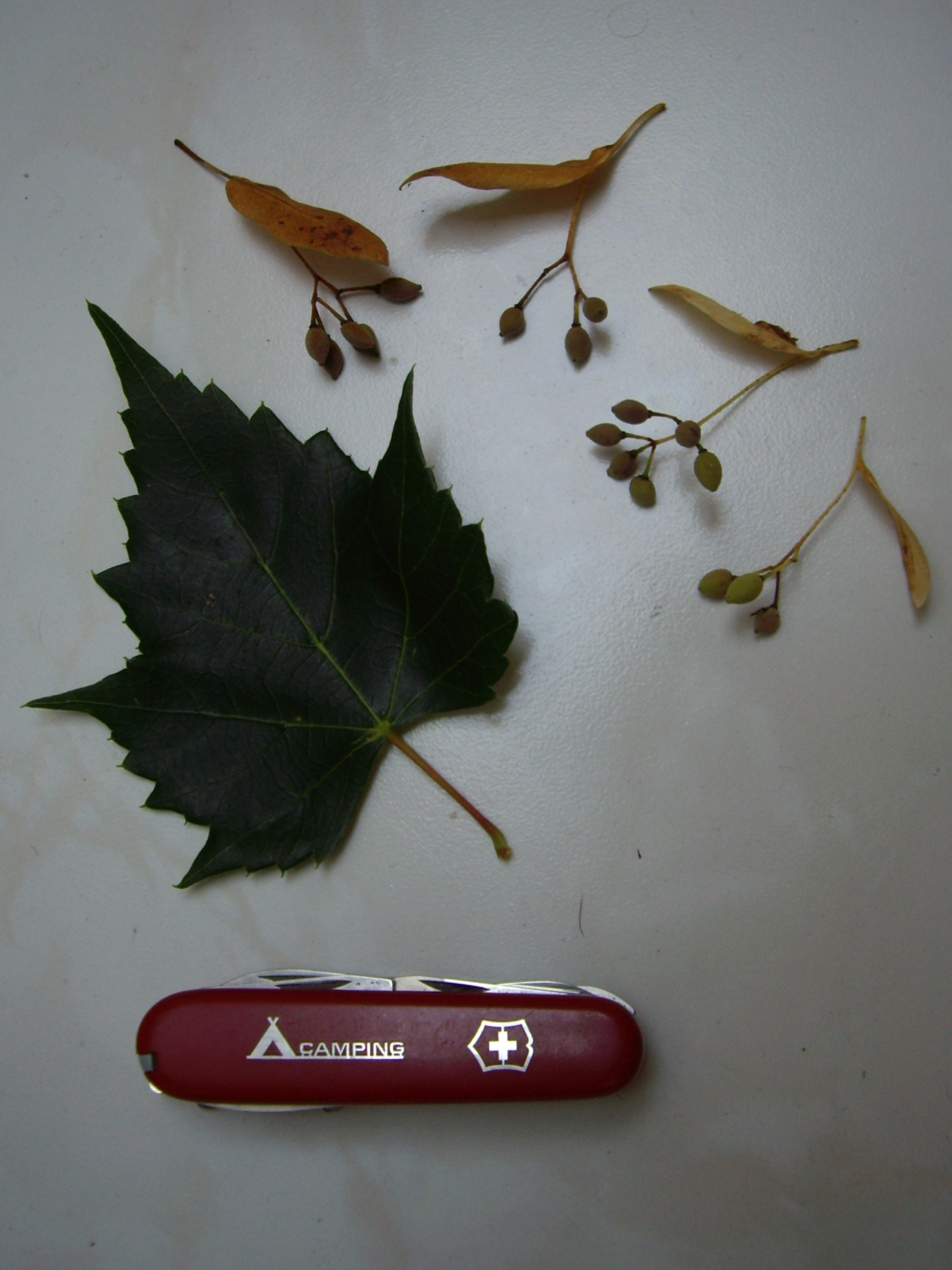
Leaf and fruits of T. mongolica.

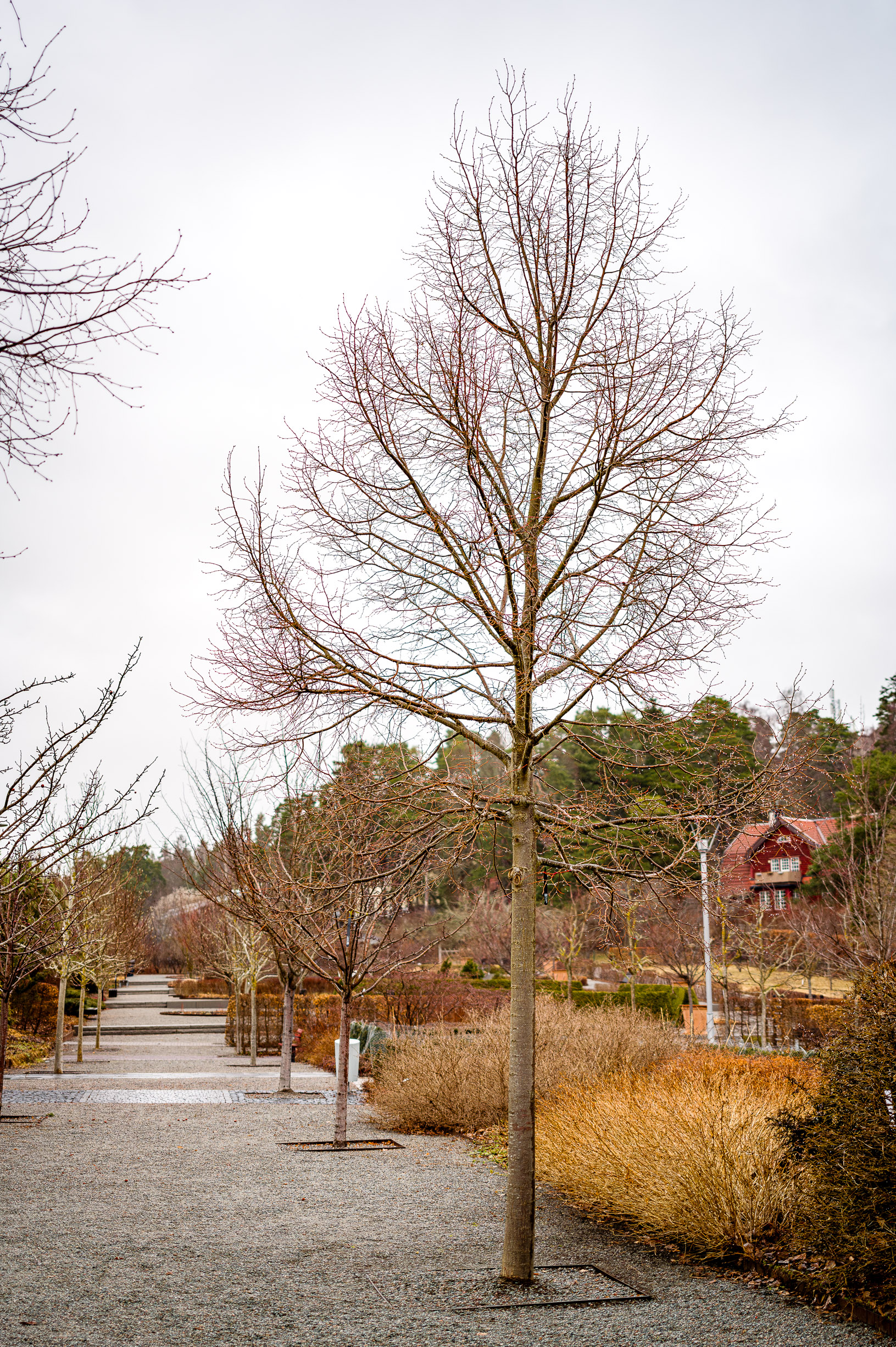
A juvenile Mongolian lime (Tilia mongolica) with clear growth habit during the winter months in Uppsala, Sweden.

== Natural distribution ==
Inner Mongolia, Shanxi, Henan, Hebei, Beijing, Liaoning, isolated locality in North Korea.

== History of discovery and cultivation ==
1863: In the summer the Mongolian lime was first collected by Pere David on slopes of the Baihua mountain in the Taihang mountain range about 120 km west to Beijing city center. The specimens collected by David can be seen in the herbarium of the National Museum of Natural History, Paris.

1871: 12 July it was collected by Nikolay Przhevalsky on southern slope of Muni-ula in western part of the Yin Mountains in Inner Mongolia. One of Przhevalsky's specimens is held as an isotype in the herbarium of the Kew Gardens, London.

1877: Again collected on the Baihua mountain by Emil Bretschneider.

1880: Karl Maximovich published first scientific description of the tree based on the specimens collected by Przhevalsky and Bretschneider.

1880: Bretschneider sent seed to the Jardin des Plantes at Paris.

1882: Bretschneider sent seed to the Arnold Arboretum at Boston.

1896: A tree in the Jardin des Plantes, raised from the seed sent by Bretschneider, flowered. Some of the gathered seed were sent to the Kew Gardens.

1907: A tree raised in the Kew Gardens flowered while only 1.5 m high.

1913: Тhe Mongolian lime was introduced to commerce in the UK by Harry Veitch at the Coombe Wood Nursery from material collected for him by William Purdom in northern China.

=== Notable trees ===
A tree planted in 1896–1897 at the Kew Gardens reached in 2014 the height 14 m and still flourishes.

The TROBI champion tree grows at Thorp Perrow Arboretum, Yorkshire. Planted in 1936, it measured 20 m tall by 59 cm d.b.h. in 2004.

A specimen planted in 1983 grows at Exbury Gardens in Hampshire.

== Literature ==
Pigott, Donald (2012). Lime-trees and basswood: a biological monograph of the genus Tilia. Cambridge: Cambridge University Press. ISBN 9780521840545. pp. 160–167.
