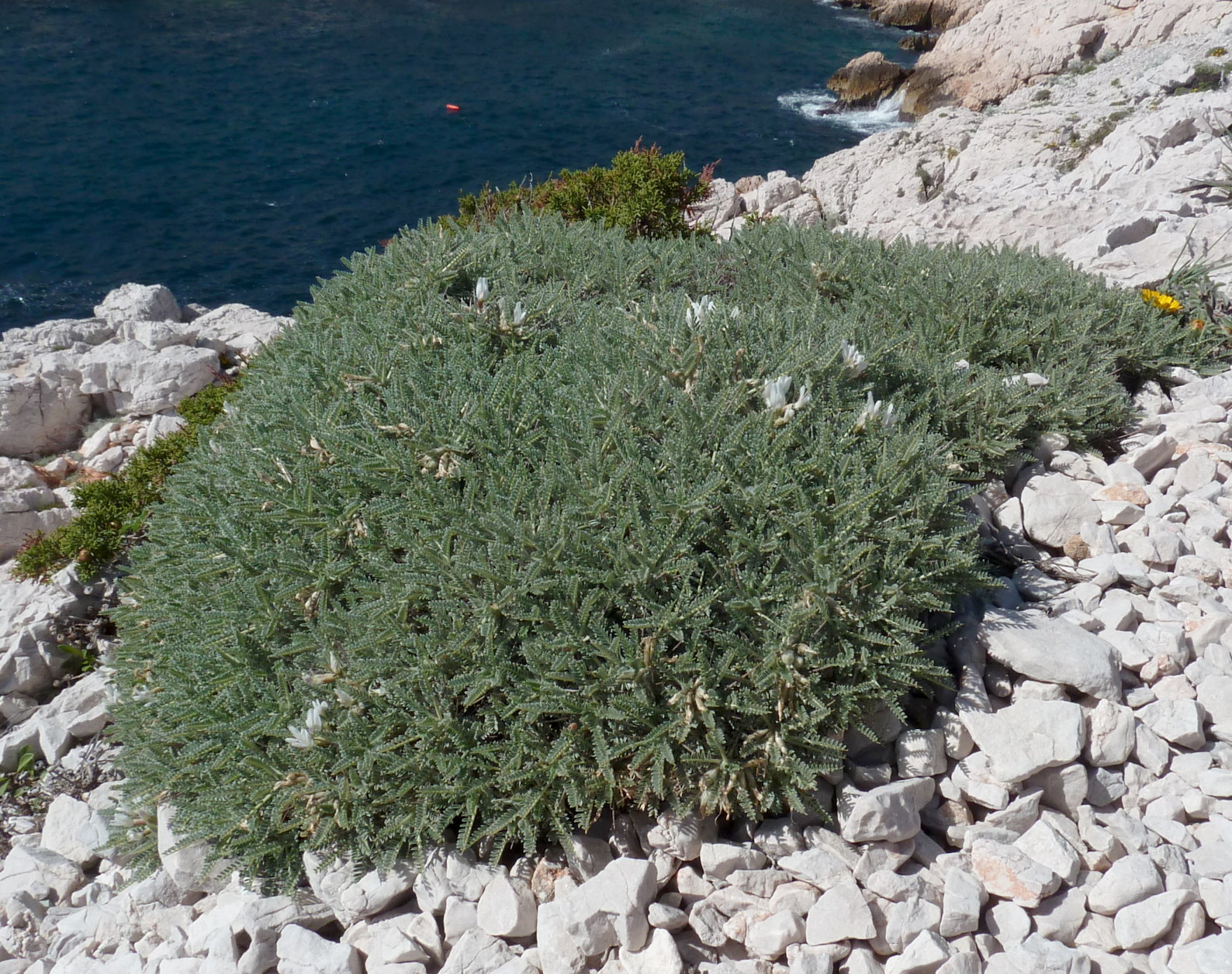

Scientific classification
- Kingdom: Plantae
- Clade: Embryophytes
- Clade: Tracheophytes
- Clade: Spermatophytes
- Clade: Angiosperms
- Clade: Eudicots
- Clade: Rosids
- Order: Fabales
- Family: Fabaceae
- Subfamily: Faboideae
- Genus: Astragalus
- Species: A. tragacantha

Binomial name
- Astragalus tragacantha L.

Synonyms
- Tragacantha vera Medik. Tragacantha massiliensis Mill. Astragalus tragacanthus Lam. Astragalus spinosissimus St.-Lag. Astragalus massiliensis var. salvatoris Willk. Astragalus massiliensis var. peduncularis Ruoy; Astragalus massiliensis (Mill.) Lam.

= Astragalus tragacantha =

Species of legume

Astragalus tragacantha, commonly known as astragale de Marseille or coussin-de-belle-mère, is a species of milkvetch in the family Fabaceae. The plant is about 10 to 25 cm in height with white, purple tinged flowers that bloom in April and March. Tragacantha grows in sandy soil around beaches and is native to France, Spain, and the Mediterranean.
