= Louis Blaringhem =

French agronomist and botanist (1878–1958)

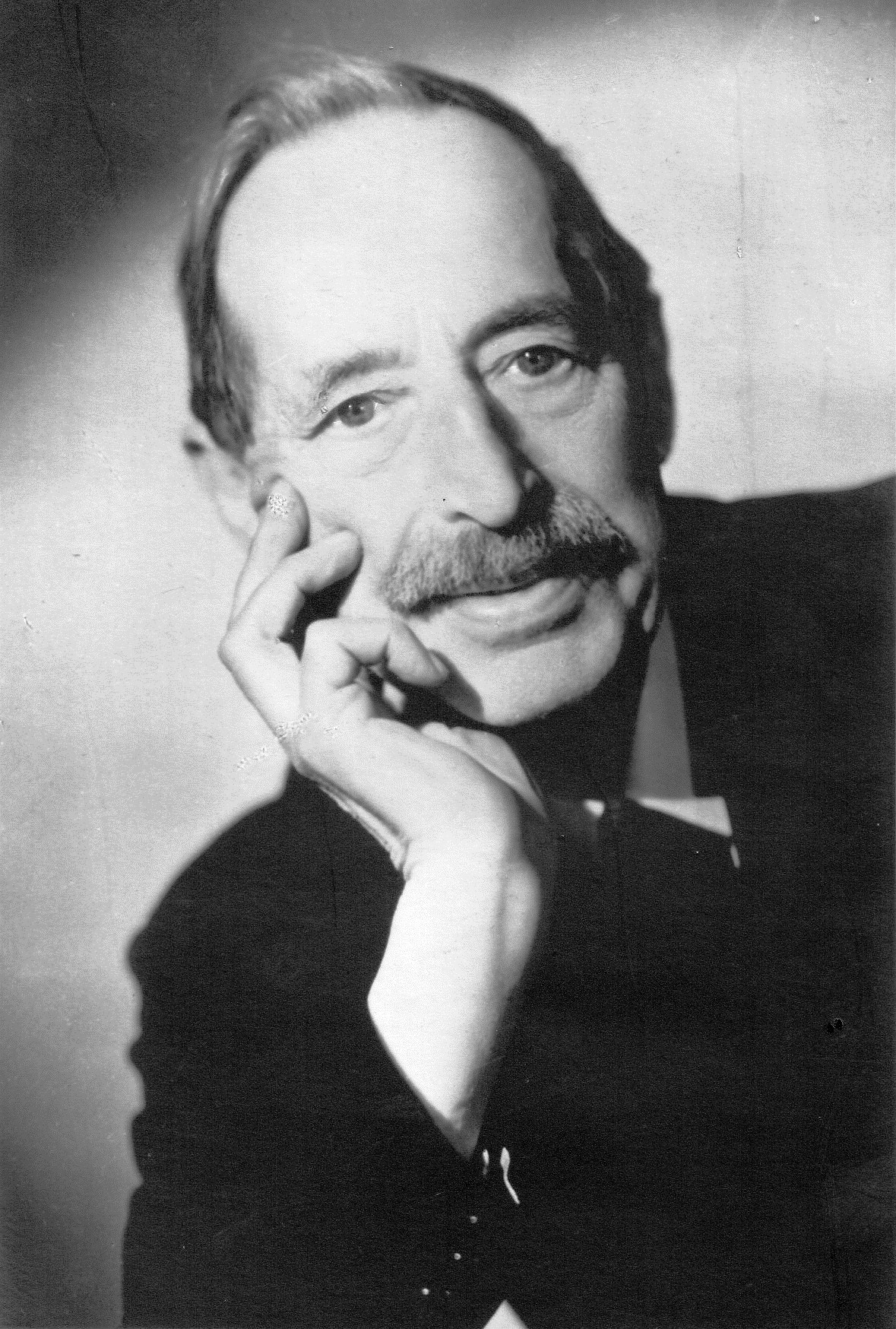
Louis Blaringhem

Louis Florimond Joseph Blaringhem (1 February 1878 in Locon – 1 January 1958 in Paris) was a French agronomist and botanist.

== Career ==
From 1899 to 1903 he studied at the Ecole Normale Supérieure in Paris, where for several years he worked as an associate researcher in geology (1903–04) and botany (1904–07). During this time period he served as an assistant in the laboratory of agriculture at the Museum d'Histoire Naturelle under Julien Noël Costantin. He also conducted research at marine biological station in Wimereux with Alfred Giard, as well as at the marine laboratory in Tatihou with Edmond Perrier and at laboratory for plant biology in Fontainebleau under Gaston Bonnier.

He performed studies of corn and barley varieties, did analysis of wheat varieties that were most suitable for the pasta industry, and conducted research of tobacco in an attempt to find the best way of producing nicotine. During the summer months of 1905–09 he studied under Hugo de Vries at the Amsterdam Botanical Garden, where he conducted research on mutations and hybrids of Oenothera. In 1909 he was appointed chef de service at the Institut Pasteur by Emile Roux.

From 1912 to 1922 he served as a professor of agriculture at the Conservatoire national des arts et métiers, then from 1922 to 1929 was a lecturer in botany at the Sorbonne, where in 1930 he received the title of professor. In 1928 he became a member of the French Academy of Sciences (botany section), and in 1928/29 served as director of the Maison Franco-Japonaise in Tokyo — in this position he met with Emperor Hirohito on several occasions.

Blaringhem was an advocate of Lamarckian evolution and mutationism. He proposed a Lamarckian mutationist synthesis.

== Selected works ==
In 1909 he published "Espèces et variétés : leur naissance par mutation", a translation of Hugo de Vries' "Species and varieties, their origin by mutation". His other principal works include:

- Mutation et traumatismes: Études sur l'évolution des formes végétales, 1907 – Mutation and trauma; Studies on the evolution of plant forms.
- Les transformations brusques des êtres vivants, 1911 – Sudden transformations in life forms.
- Le perfectionnement des plantes, 1913 – The development of plants.
- Les problèmes de l'hérédité expérimentale, 1919 – The problems of experimental heredity.
- Pasteur et le transformisme, 1923 – Pasteur and transformism.
- Principes et formules de l'hérédité mendélienne, 1928 – Principles and formulas of Mendelian inheritance.
