= University of Angers =

Public university in western France

Coordinates: 47°28′48″N 0°36′5″W

- Université d'Angers
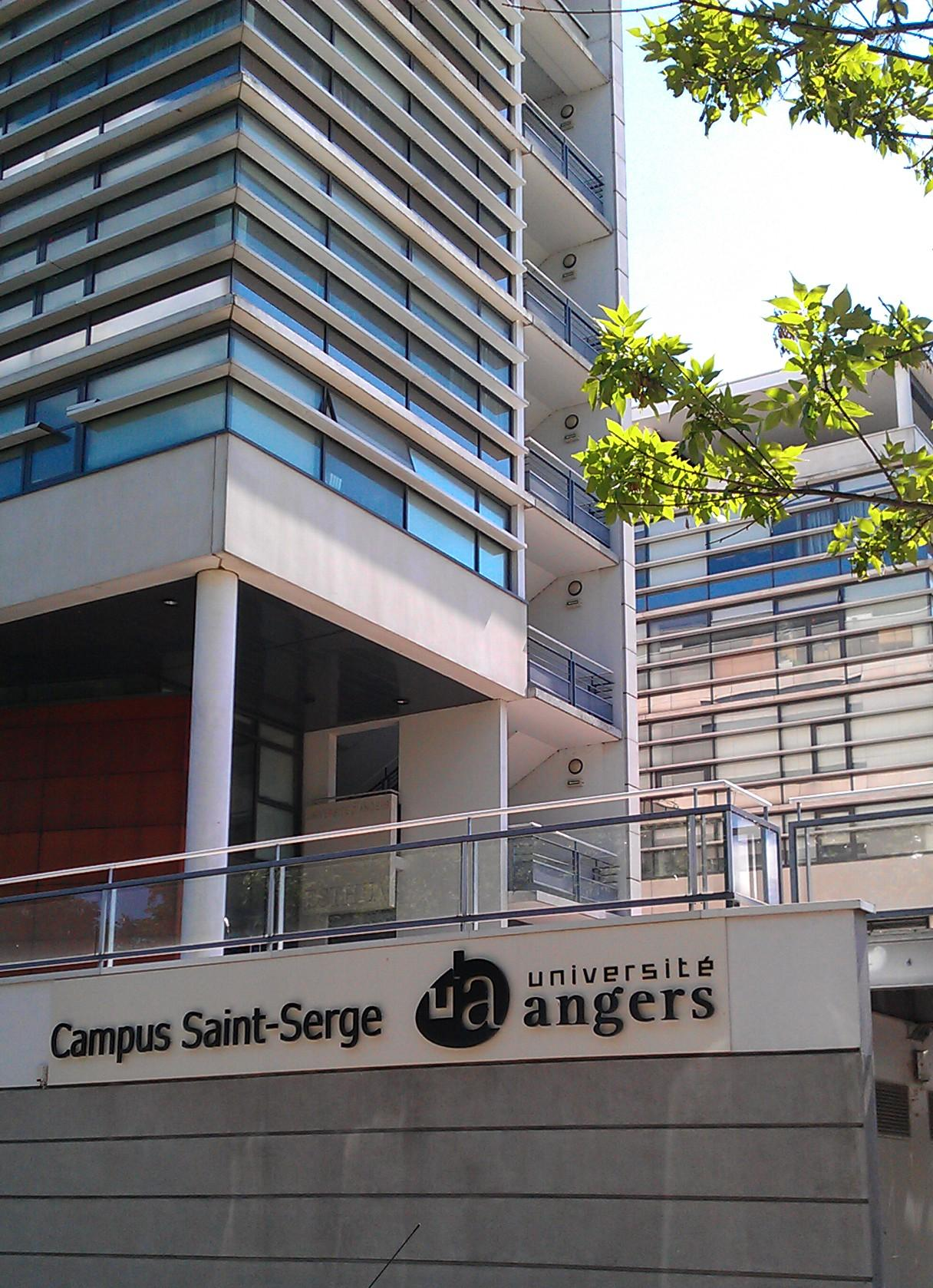
- Saint-Serge Campus in Angers
- Type: Public
- Established: 11th century (initial formation); 1971 (reopened)
- Affiliations: AUF, ComUE Angers-Le Mans, EUA
- President: Christian Roblédo
- Academic staff: 2,083
- Students: 26,295
- Location: Angers; Cholet; Saumur, Pays de la Loire, France
- Website: univ-angers.fr

The University of Angers (French: Université d'Angers, UA) is a public university in western France, with campuses in Angers, Cholet, and Saumur.

It is part of the Angers-Le Mans University Community.

== History ==
The University of Angers was initially established during the 11th century as the School of Angers. It became known as the University of Angers in 1337 and was the fifth largest university in France at the time. The university existed until 1793 when all universities in France were closed. Nearly 2 centuries later, the university was reestablished in 1971 after a regrouping of several preexisting higher education establishments. It would go on to add additional campuses in Cholet and Saumur in 1987 and 2004, respectively. Today, the University of Angers counts more than 25,000 students across all campuses.

The university was rated the best university in France in 2015 for success rates.

== Academics ==
The University of Angers offers bachelors, vocational bachelors, masters, and doctoral degrees across its 8 faculties and institutes:

- Faculty of Tourism and Culture (ESTHUA)
- Faculty of Health
- Faculty of Languages, Humanities and Social Sciences
- Faculty of Law and Economics
- Faculty of Sciences
- Institute of Business Administration (IAE)
- Institute of Technology (IUT)
- Polytech Angers (Engineering school)

The university also offers non-degree options, including DAEU diplomas.

== Campuses ==
The University of Angers is situated on 3 campuses in various parts of Angers (Belle-Beille, Santé, and Saint-Serge), as well as campuses in Cholet and Saumur. There are 2 university libraries, available on the Saint-Serge and Belle-Beille campuses. Near the Santé campus, the university maintains a botanical garden, which as of 2022, is open year-round. The university also offers several CROUS student residence and dining halls in Angers.

== Memorial ==
In 2015, the Maison des Sciences Humaines at the university was named after Germaine Tillion (1907-2008), an ethnologist and member of the French Resistance.

== Notable faculty ==
=== Ancient ===
- Nicolas d'Orbellis (c.1400-1475) - Franciscan theologian and philosopher, of the Scotist school
- William Gordon (c. 1499–1577) - last of the pre-Reformation bishops of Aberdeen owing allegiance to the Roman Catholic Church
- John Baber (1625 – 1704) - English physician to Charles II,
- Pierre Fauchard (1679-1761) - physician, credited as being the father of modern dentistry
- Étienne-Alexandre Bernier (1762-1806) - theologian and Royalist politician

=== Modern ===
- Jörg Guido Hülsmann (born 1966) - monetary economist
- Jean Laroche (1921, in Nantes–2010) - poet
- Pierre Michel (born 1942) - professor of literature
- David Trotman (born 1951) - mathematician

== Notable alumni ==
=== Ancient ===
- William de Lauder (c. 1380 – 1425) - bishop of Glasgow and Lord Chancellor of Scotland.
- Robert Morison (1620-1683) - Scottish botanist and taxonomist
- Johan de Witt (1625-1672) - Dutch statesman
- Regnier de Graaf (1641-1673) - Dutch physician, physiologist and anatomist
- Robert Sibbald (1641-1722) - Scottish physician and antiquary
- Denis Papin (1647-1713) - physicist, mathematician and inventor
- Georges-Louis Leclerc, Comte de Buffon (1707-1788) - naturalist, mathematician, cosmologist, and encyclopédiste

=== Modern ===
- Roselyne Bachelot (born 1946) - politician
- Jiro Ono (小野 次郎) (born 1953) - Japanese politician
- Denis Mukwege (born 1955) - Congolese gynecologist and Pentecostal pastor; jointly awarded the Nobel Peace Prize 2018
- Christine Bard (born 1965)- French founder of the Archives du féminisme

== See also ==
- List of medieval universities
