= Titiou Lecoq =

French writer and feminist (born 1980)

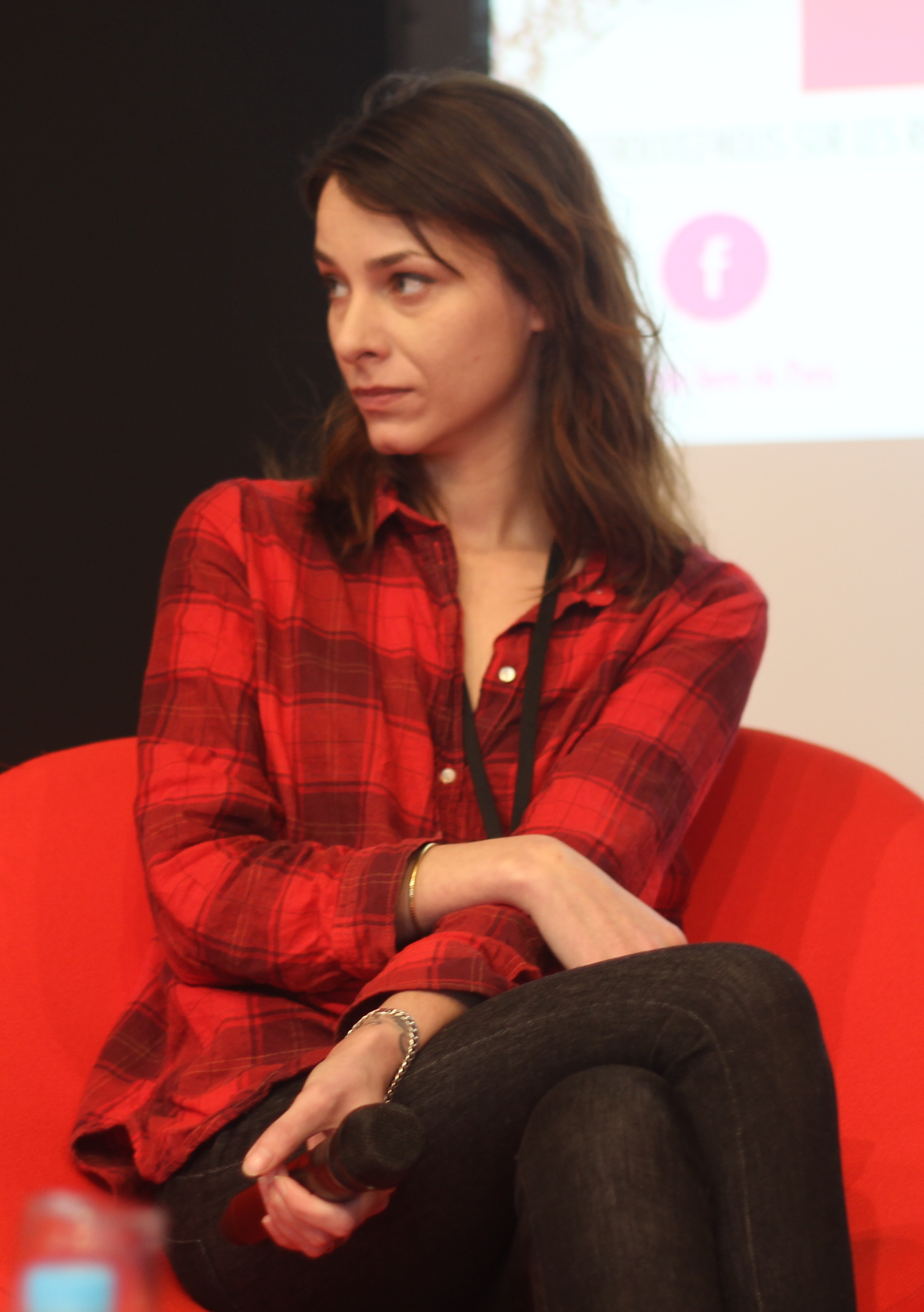
- Lecoq in 2015
- Born: Audrey Lecoq; 22 January 1980 (age 46) Paris, France
- Occupation: Writer; journalist; activist
- Genre: Non-fiction, fiction
- Subject: Internet culture, women in society and history
- Years active: 2011–present
- Notable works: Girls and Geeks, Les Morues
- Notable awards: Premier roman du Doubs

Audrey "Titiou" Lecoq ([lə.kɔk], born 22 January 1980) is a French journalist, blogger and novelist, known for her books, blogs, and articles about Internet culture, and her activism for women's rights.

Articles by herself and about her views and publications have been published by leading French newsmedia, including Le Monde, Libération, L'Express, and others. As of 2024, Lecoq has authored four novels and ten non-fiction works in French, some of which have also been published in German, Italian, and Russian translations.

== Life and career ==
During her childhood in Paris in the 1980s and 1990s, before the Internet was popular, Lecoq was an avid reader of French novels in her mother's library. Growing up in a family of women, with her mother raising her daughters alone, she only realized that "women did not rule the universe" after she left home.

Having owned her first computer in 1997, Lecoq has described herself as a fan of social media and the Internet, as well as a feminist, and as such fighting against sexism, traditional male/female roles and violence against women.

After graduating with a Diplôme des Études Approfondies in semiotics, she started her career as an intern with the cultural magazine Les Inrockuptibles. An article in Le Monde described her as a representative of "the feminist galaxy... of 2017". Writing for the French online magazine Slate.fr for 13 years, she authored more than 388 articles, until she took a break on 14 January 2022.

From 2008 until 21 April 2020, Lecoq published her blog Girls and Geeks, where she wrote about her daily life and her love life. Having published parts of her blog in the 2015 non-fiction book Sans télé, on ressent davantage le froid (Without TV, you feel the cold more), she said that she appreciates the free form of writing blogs, including the commentaries, and that this form of writing does not really work in a book.

=== Activism for victims of domestic violence ===
Having written an article on 30 June 2017 for the daily newspaper Libération about more than 100 women who had been killed as victims of domestic violence in a year, she started counting such femicides during the following two years. Based on reports of 200 women murdered by their partners, she highlighted the intentional aspects of such femicides. Further, she commented that femicides are generally committed by men "who kill women because they believe they [the women] must belong to them."

Lecoq said these assassinations should be seen as premeditated murder and never be excused as mere "crimes of passion". As their roots lie in patriarchal attitudes, these acts of violence are often merely seen as acts of an almost common nature. Further, the consequences, even when they do not always result in murder, are severe for the woman, who is the direct victim, and for children, who are sometimes killed as well. As Lecoq understands these murders as typically largely "invisible" and insufficiently condemned, she called for more public awareness and insisted on the importance of efficient action of the police, the justice system, and on financial support for associations working for this cause.

=== Scenarios for documentary series ===
In 2023, Lecoq and French filmmaker Gabrielle Stemmer co-wrote the scenarios for a documentary web series titled Les femmes sous algorithmes (Women and algorithms). Focussing on common gender roles and stereotype activities of women from different cultures in YouTube videos, the series was co-produced and broadcast by Franco-German TV network Arte.

== Publications ==
As of 2024, Lecoq has authored four novels, eight books of non-fiction for adults and two for young readers, dealing with Internet culture, young women's sex life, the unequal distribution of domestic work and income between men and women, as well as women neglected or forgotten by history. Some of them have been translated into German, Italian and Russian. Her style has been described as expressing both humor and suspense. Looking back at Lecoq's 15 years as a writer in 2024, Lesinrockuptibles called her "the novelist of an epoch".

In 2007, she began writing her first novel, Les Morues, which in French colloquial language translates to The Sluts. Published in 2011, this is the story of young Parisians, of the same generation as herself, raised with MTV, Jacques Chirac and Kurt Cobain, hooked on the Internet and anti-globalization parties, active as journalists and bloggers. Her 2017 novel La Théorie de la tartine deals with a young woman, who has a sex tape posted by her ex, an immature hacker and a visionary journalist, who believes that the Internet will transform the world to help her.

In 2017, her non-fiction book Libérées! Le combat féministe se gagne devant le panier de linge sale (Liberated! The feminist fight is won in front of the basket of dirty laundry) dealt with the mental stress that weighs on young mothers. Commenting on the unequal distribution of household-tasks and the double burden on women working outside and in the home, she wrote: "We cannot work like our grandfathers and run the house like our grandmothers." In this book, she also denounced the sexist image of women as portrayed on social media, in particular Instagram.

=== Non-fiction ===
- Kata Sutra, la vérité crue sur la vie sexuelle des filles, avec Nadia Daam, Emma Defaud, Élisabeth Philippe et Johanna Sabroux, Paris: Jacob-Duvernet, 2009, ISBN 2847242449.
- Encyclopédie de la webculture, avec Diane Lisarelli, Paris: Robert Laffont, 2011 ISBN 222112829X.
- Sans télé, on ressent davantage le froid, Paris: Fayard, 2015 ISBN 2213678677, also published as Chroniques de la débrouille, Paris: Le Livre de poche, ISBN 225318263X.
- Libérées ! Le combat féministe se gagne devant le panier de linge sale, Paris: Fayard, 2017 ISBN 9782213705347.
- Honoré et moi, Paris: L'Iconoclaste, 2019.
- Les Grandes Oubliées. Pourquoi l'Histoire a effacé les femmes, (The Great Forgotten Ones: Why History erased Women), Paris: L'Iconoclaste, 2021 ISBN 9782378802424.
  - Adapted version for young adult readers as Les Femmes aussi ont fait l'histoire (Women also have made History), Paris: Les Arènes jeunesse, 2023, ISBN 9791037509734
- Le Couple et l'Argent, Paris: L'Iconoclaste, 2022, ISBN 9782378803070.
- Comment apprendre à manipuler ses parents: en 1 semaine! Illustrated children's book. Paris: Nathan, 2023 ISBN 9782095003517.
- Vanhoenacker, Charline; Lecoq, Titiou; Thouron, Zoé (2023). En vacances, Simone! (in French). Paris: Denoël. ISBN 978-2-207-16955-1.

=== Novels ===
- Les Morues, Paris: Au diable vauvert, 2011, ISBN 2846263477, Le Livre de poche ISBN 9782253166801, Award Premier roman du Doubs.
- La Théorie de la tartine, Paris: Au diable vauvert, 2015, ISBN 2846269327, Paris: Le livre de Poche, 2016, ISBN 9782253069096.
- Honoré et moi: Parce qu'il a réussi sa vie en passant son temps à la rater, Balzac est mon frère. 2021. Paris: Librairie Générale Française, ISBN 9782253078432.
- Une époque en or, Paris: L'Iconoclaste, 2024, ISBN 9782378804350.

== See also ==
- Feminism in France#Third-wave feminism
- Christine Bard
