= Jardin des plantes d'Angers =

Municipal park and botanical garden in Angers, Pays de la Loire, France

Coordinates: 47.4748°N 0.5445°W

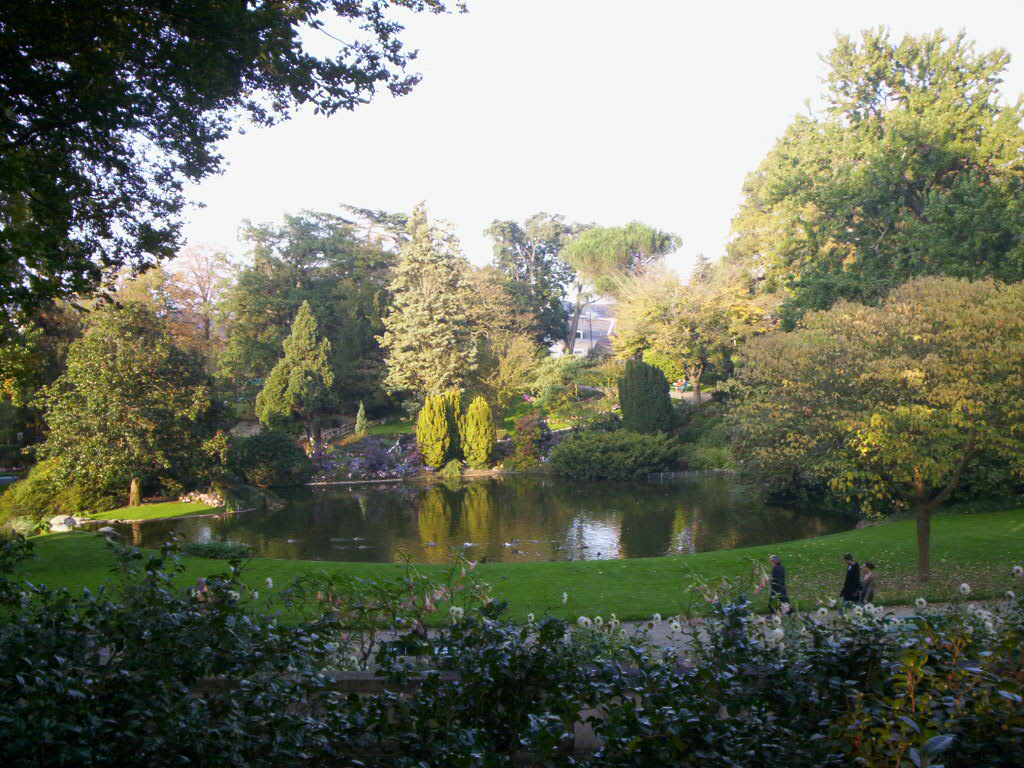
Jardin des plantes d'Angers

The jardin des plantes d'Angers (4 hectares) is a municipal park and botanical garden located on Place Pierre Mendès France, Angers, Maine-et-Loire, Pays de la Loire, France. It is open daily without charge.

The garden was first established in 1777 by Doctor Luthier de La Richerie, founder of the Société des Botanophiles, as an amateur's botanical garden in response to Anger's first such garden, maintained by the Faculty of Medicine circa 1740–1750. Its first location was on the Château Gontier and Bressigny roads, near today's rue Béclard, but that site proved too small and its rental too uncertain. Therefore, in 1789 the society purchased the former property of the Benedictines of Saint Sergius at the bottom of the valley Saint-Samson, which forms today's this jardin des plantes ('garden of the plants'.

The site was cleared in the winter of 1790–1791, and in 1791 Merlet de La Boulaye gave the first free, public course on botany; in the following year, he wrote out a list in alphabetical order of the garden's collections, including the first magnolia in Angers and an agave from America. The city purchased the grounds of the Saint-Samson church shortly afterwards, and merged them with the botanical garden, with the result declared national property in 1792.

By 1811 the garden contained more than 2,000 plants arranged in two sections: the School of Botany in the lower part and collections of foreign trees and seed-bearing plants in the upper. It also contained an orangery flanked by two greenhouses. The garden was further extended in 1834, and in the late 19th century the School of Botany gradually transferred to the school of medicine, where it forms today's Jardin botanique de la Faculté de Pharmacie d'Angers. The remaining garden was completely remodeled in 1901–1905 by noted landscape architect Édouard André, famous for his parks in Monte Carlo and Montevideo; today's current garden is in his English style with a cascading stream. A new menagerie was installed soon after 1945, and an aviary, and the old greenhouses removed in 1962. The garden's last expansion occurred in 1967 when 2500 m^{2} was added as a rock garden.

== See also ==
- Jardin botanique de la Faculté de Pharmacie d'Angers
- List of botanical gardens in France
- Terra Botanica
