= Conservation and restoration of taxidermy =

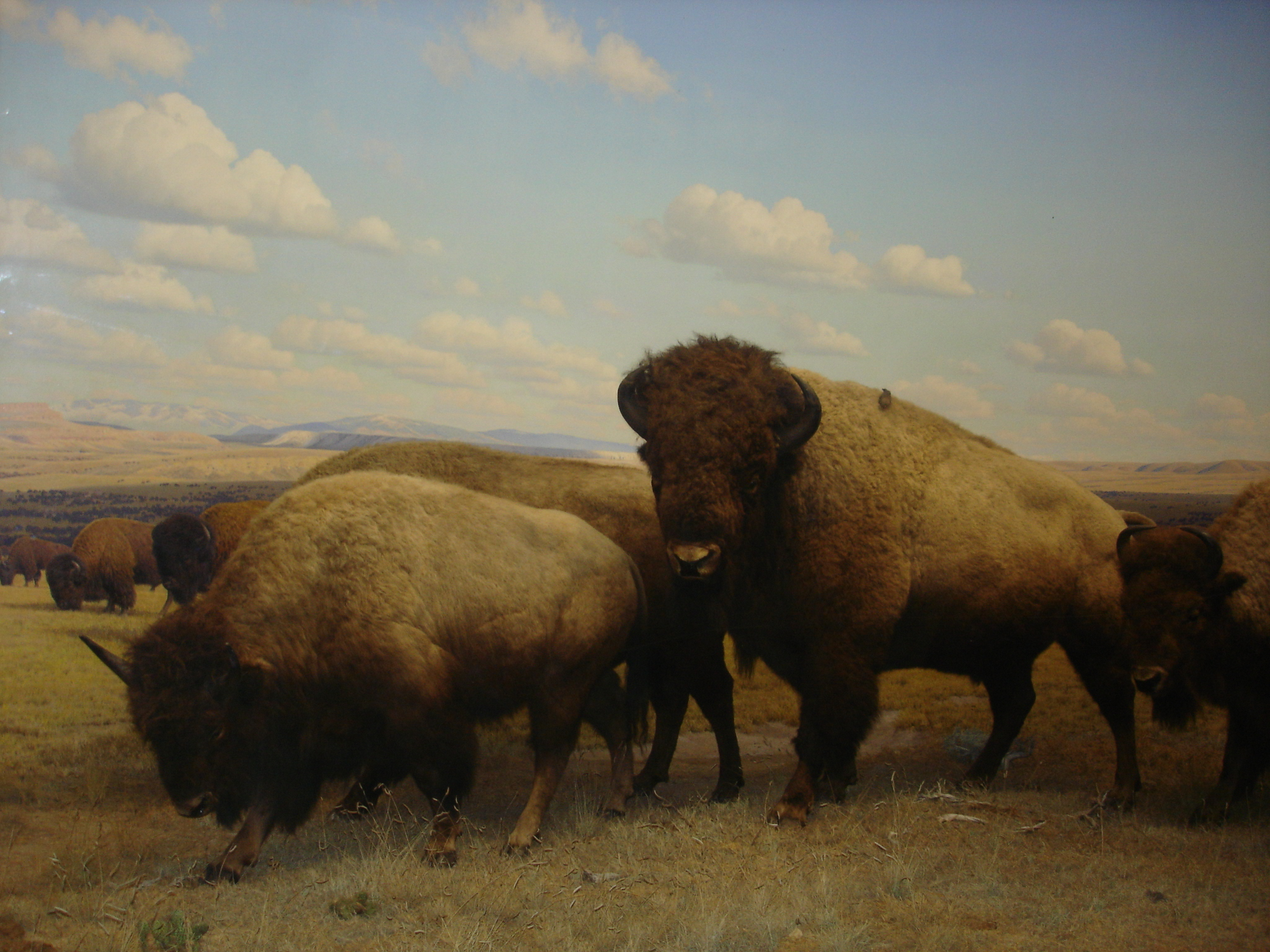
Bison diorama in 2009 before treatments, American Museum of Natural History

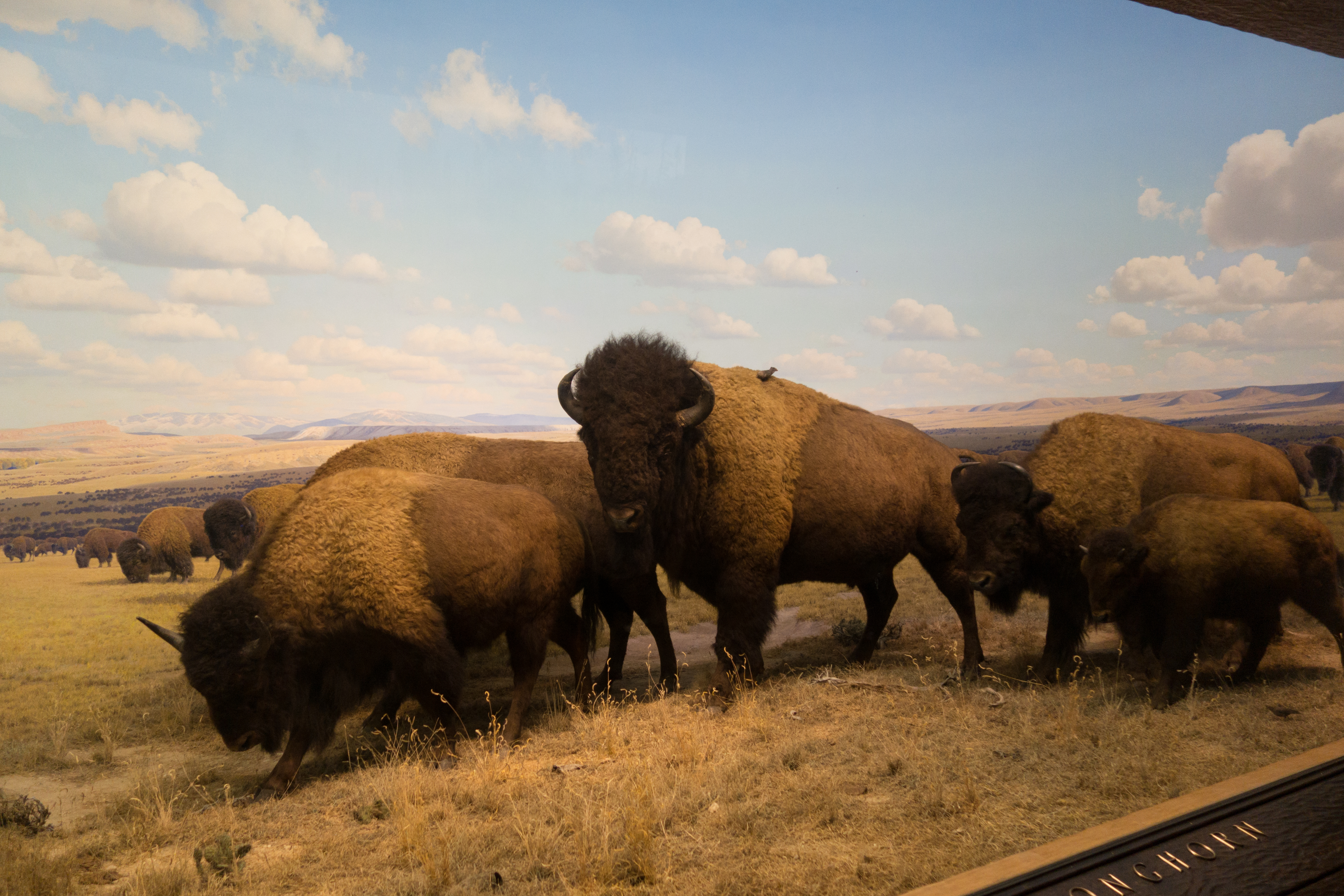
Bison diorama in 2015 after extensive treatments, American Museum of Natural History

The conservation of taxidermy is the ongoing maintenance and preservation of zoological specimens that have been mounted or stuffed for display and study. Taxidermy specimens contain a variety of organic materials, such as fur, bone, feathers, skin, and wood, as well as inorganic materials, such as burlap, glass, and foam. Due to their composite nature, taxidermy specimens require special care and conservation treatments for the different materials.

== Types and uses ==
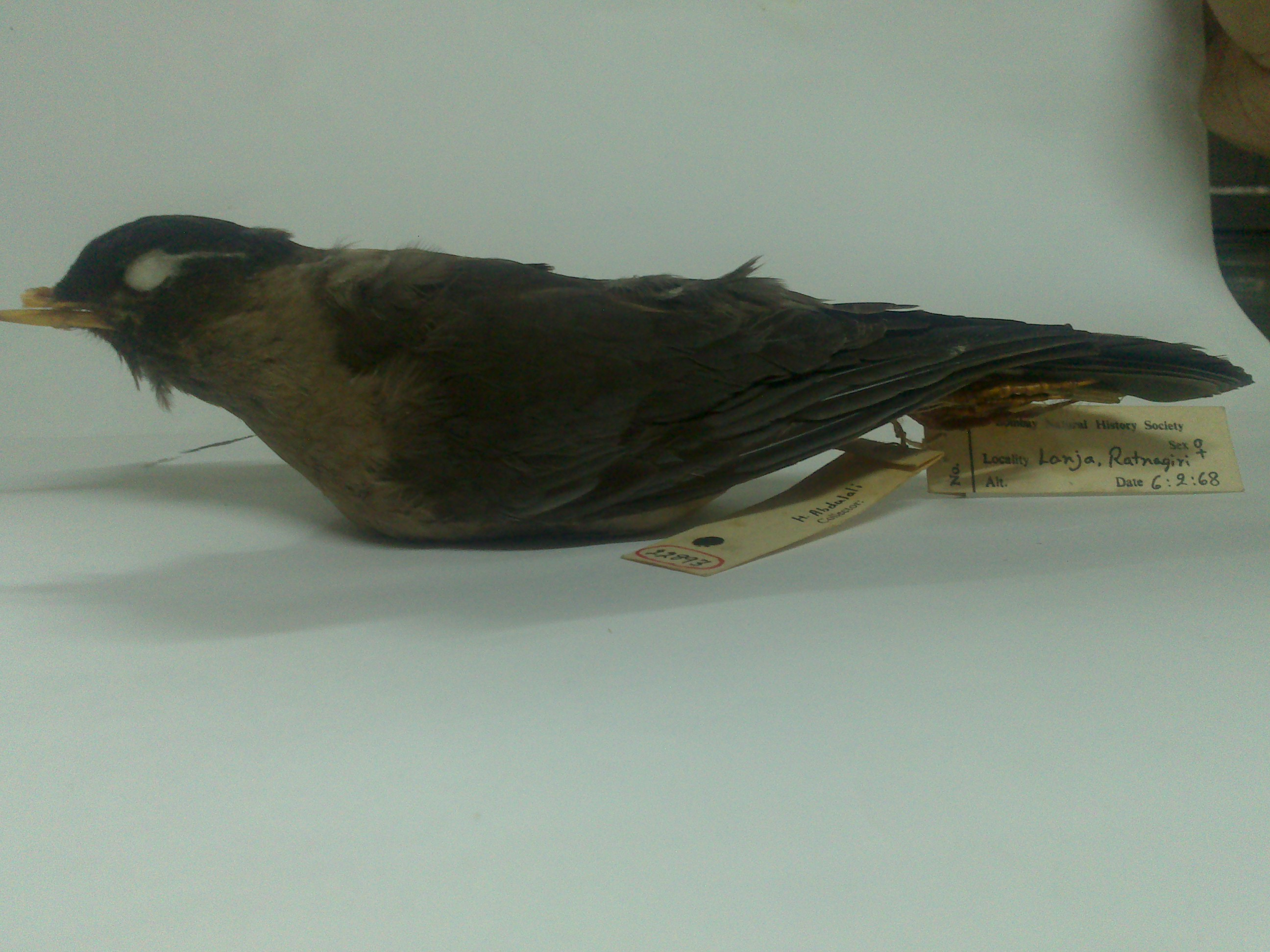
Example of a study skin

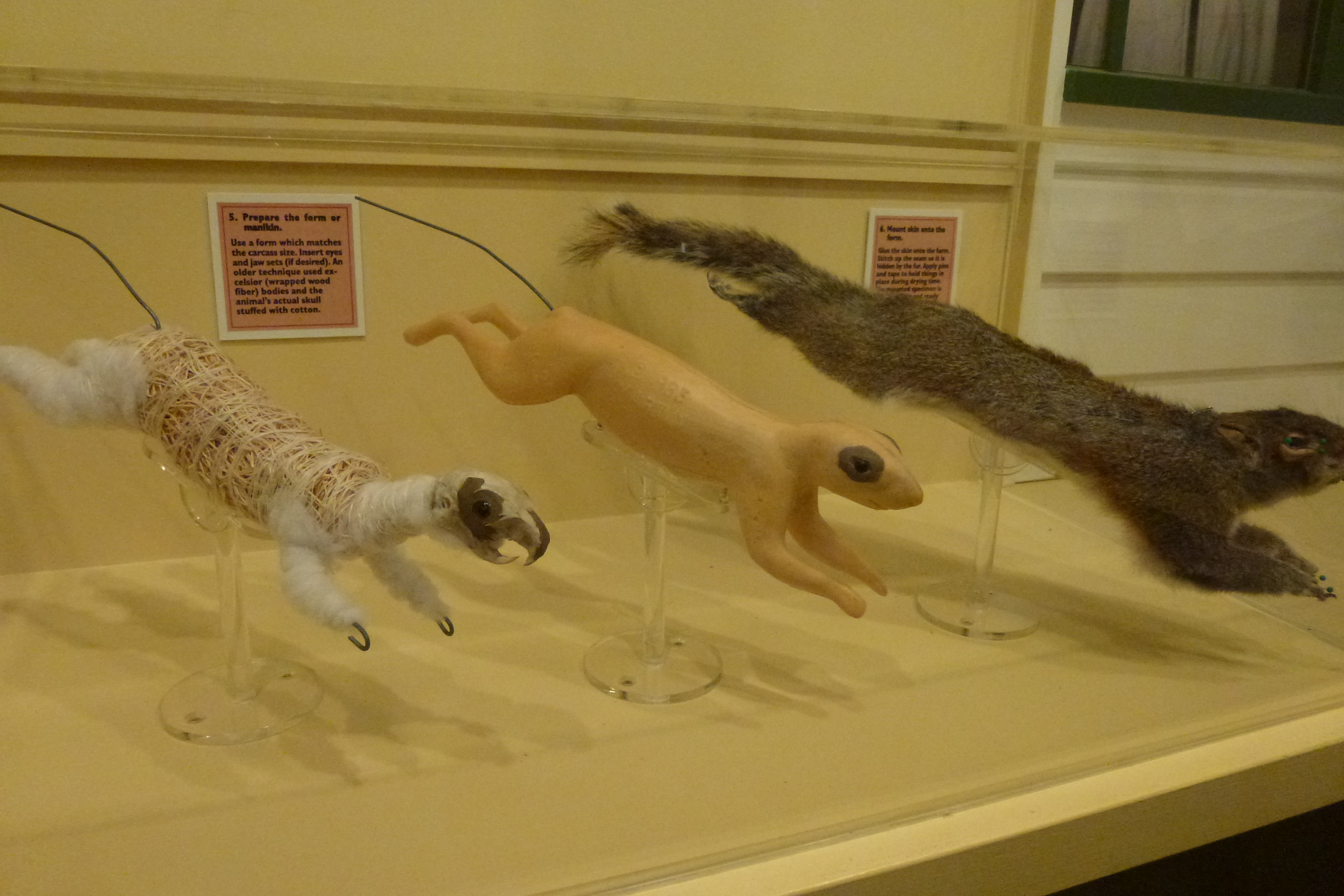
Display with different examples of support forms

Traditional taxidermy specimens are cleaned and preserved animal skins that have been mounted over a form. Full mounts are the entire specimen, while shoulder mounts only include the head, neck, and shoulders. Study skins are another form of taxidermy in which the skins of small mammals and birds are stuffed with cotton, wool, or synthetic fibers in order to support the skin and original body shape. These are typically used by researchers rather than put on display.

Taxidermy has a robust history, and specimens can be found in a number of public and private institutions, as well as personal collections. Natural history museums, zoos, science & nature centers, historic houses, art museums, and children's museums are examples of institutions that may have taxidermy specimens in their collections.

While it may not be necessary to conserve mounts or skins of commonly occurring animals beyond educational use, some taxidermy mounts represent extinct or critically endangered species. The Smithsonian's National Museum of Natural History houses Martha, the last passenger pigeon and some collections still have Great Auk specimens, a bird species that went extinct in 1844.

== Causes of deterioration ==
As with other types of collections, taxidermy specimens are susceptible to agents of deterioration, including pests, lights, temperature, humidity, and custodial neglect. Improper storage, display, and handling of taxidermy specimens can lead to many of these causes of deterioration.

=== Pest damage ===
Pests, such as dermestid beetles, clothes moths, and rodents, can cause damage to taxidermy specimens by eating materials and leaving larvae husks behind. Dermestid beetles in particular can digest keratin and will feed on hair, horns, and feathers. Signs of a pest infestation in taxidermy include small piles of dust (known as frass) underneath a specimen and shedding skin from growing larvae. Additional signs of an infestation include chewing marks, loss of hair, fur, or feathers on mounts, webbing, and fecal pellets or stains.

=== Environmental damage ===
==== Pollutants ====
Over time, taxidermy specimens can accumulate layers of dust, dirt, and other airborne pollutants, especially if they are house on open shelving or display. Additionally, cases and containers made of unstable materials can off gas pollutants, such as H_{2}S, SO_{2}, formaldehyde, peroxides, and organic acids, which can damage the surfaces of taxidermy.

==== Light ====
Fading of fur, feathers, and skins is almost exclusively caused by improper lighting conditions, such as long-term exposure to ultraviolet (UV) light. UV light can come from both natural and artificial lighting sources.

==== Temperature ====
Specimens may lose fur or feathers when exposed to warm environments because the high temperature causes residual fats in skins to release.

==== Humidity ====
Taxidermy specimens are especially susceptible to fluctuations in humidity due to their composite materials. Relative humidity fluctuations below 40% can cause greater damage than fluctuations above 40%. Dry environments with low humidity may cause de-lamination or cracking in horns, bones, and turtle shells. Additionally, dry environments can cause skins and leathers to contract and shrink over the support form, which eventually leads to cracking and splitting. High humidity and moist environments can promote mold growth and attract pests. Bones will contract and swell due to humidity fluctuations, which may lead to cracking and splitting. This may lead to further structural damage if the bones are used as support within the specimen.

=== Damage caused by humans ===
==== Improper handling ====
Breakage of appendages is likely to occur if specimens are not properly handled. Bird specimens are especially susceptible to breaking at the neck, while mammals' ears tend to be the first component to break or become disfigured.

==== Packing and shipping ====
Given their unique shape and form, taxidermy specimens can be difficult to ship and if not packed properly, can be easily damaged. Ears, necks, and birds' beaks can break or bend during shipment if not properly supported.

==== Theft and vandalism ====
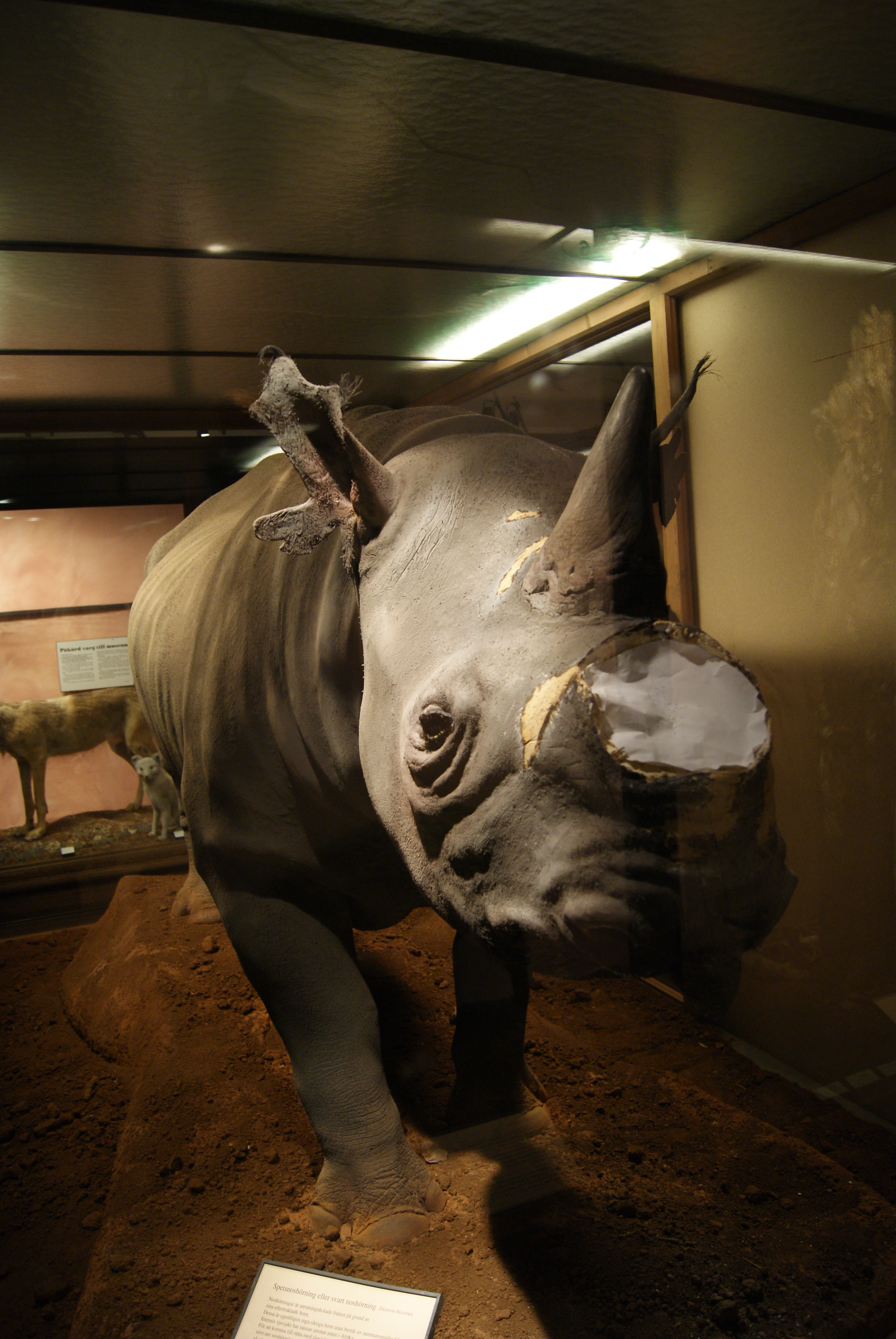
Rhinoceros specimen with missing horn due to theft

Some taxidermy specimens are vulnerable to direct damage by humans, especially if the species is associated with a valuable body part. Thieves may opt to take only part of a taxidermy specimen, which can impact the structural integrity of the entire specimen.

=== Inherent vice ===
Sometimes taxidermy specimens are susceptible to damage that is difficult to avoid and inherent to the nature of taxidermy. Metals, such as nickel and copper, used in support structures and forms can react to fatty acids in skins and cause corrosion. Gravity can also negatively impact taxidermy specimens by pulling unsupported components, such as tails and horns, away from the main structure, thus causing tears and breaks. Gravitational damage typically occurs with specimens on display, where support structures are not part of a diorama or case. However, hanging study skins in storage experience a gravitational pull that causes stretching and tearing of the skins.

== Hazardous materials in taxidermy ==
Before extensive handling, hands-on display use or conservation treatments are carried out, it is important to test taxidermy specimens for hazardous materials. Arsenic, mercury, naphthalene, para-dichlorobenzene, asbestos, and DDT are all commonly found in taxidermy collections. These chemicals were used to treat skins during preparation and helped reduce mold and pest damage. However, they can cause serious health concerns and illness in humans. Conservators may test for the presence of these hazardous materials in order to determine the appropriate course of treatment. In addition to testing, conservators may also review museum records, inspect specimens, or examine storage areas to determine what hazardous materials may be present.

== Conservation and restoration treatments ==
Treatments should be carried out by conservators or qualified taxidermists. Some taxidermists have experience working with museums and can coordinate with conservators to preserve specimens. When cleaning specimens, it is necessary to wear protective gear such as nitrile gloves, dust masks, eye protection, and lab coats.

=== Basic cleaning ===
Taxidermy specimens can gather dirt and dust over time and may only need basic remedial treatments to be conserved. Basic cleaning can be done on a regular basis to help keep specimens in good condition.

==== Fur ====
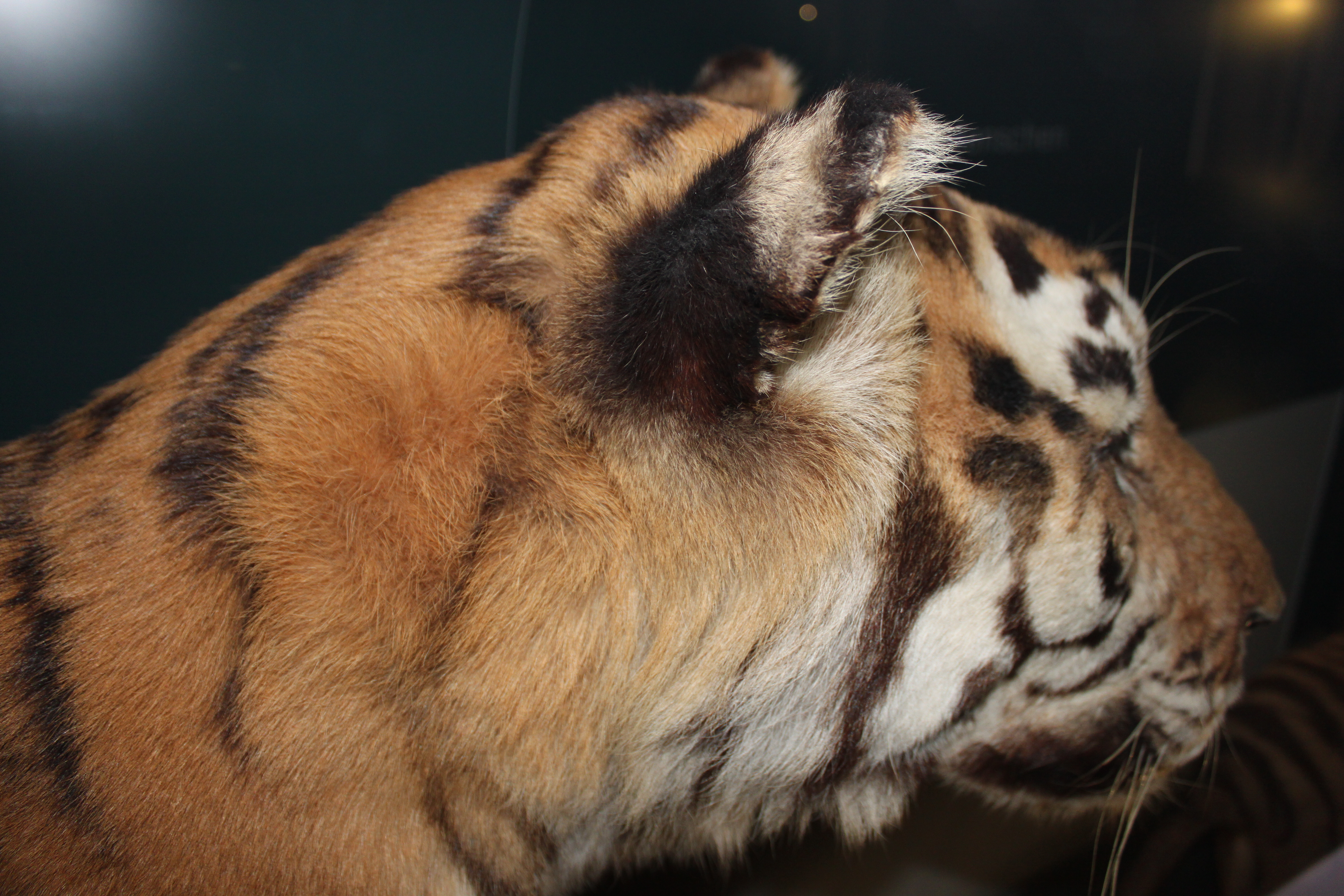
Example of fur on a tiger specimen

Fur may be gently cleaned with a soft-bristled brush or comb, which will help loosen particulates that have built up. A vacuum with a soft brush attachment will also work to remove dust and dirt. For particularly dirty furs, conservators may opt to wash the specimen's fur with water and a mild detergent or soap. If a mount has been exposed to fire and is covered with fine soot, a smoke sponge may be used to wipe down the fur. Some taxidermists promote cleaning of fur with furniture polish, however, this method will cause wax to build up and eventually dull the color of the fur.

==== Feathers ====
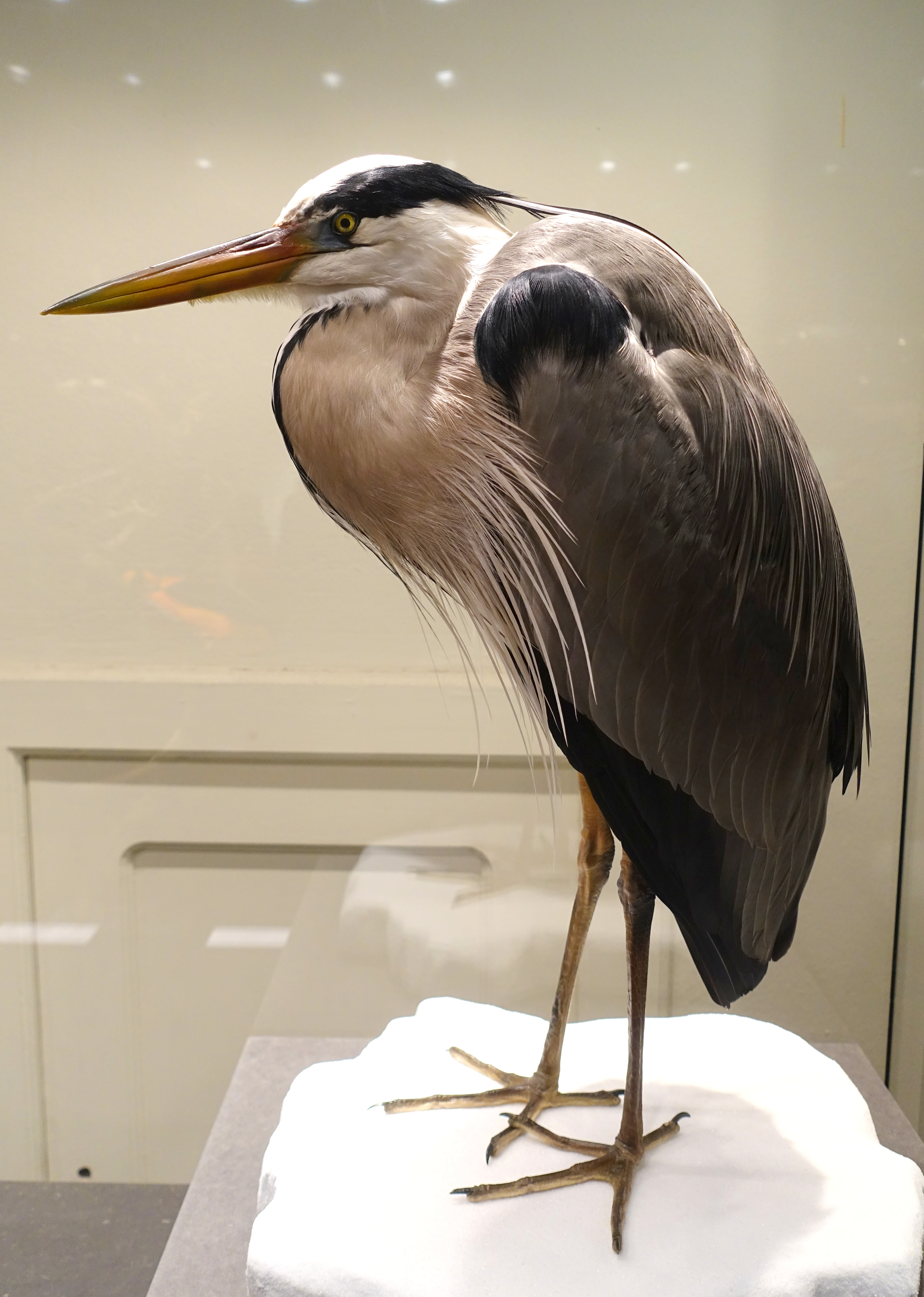
A variety of feathers are present on some bird specimens (great blue heron pictured).

Dust and dirt can accumulate on feathers and can be cleaned manually. The preferred methods are gentle brushing with a soft bristled brush or pinpoint vacuuming through a screen. These methods will leave the feathers in good condition in their natural alignment. However, solvents may be needed to clean feathers if dust is held in place by grease, which can leach out of skins. Distilled water may be used if dry methods fail, but more stubborn dust may need to be cleaned with non-denatured 70% ethanol. However, solvents may strip natural oils in feathers and leave them brittle.

==== Skin ====
Exposed skin on a mount, such as noses, mouths, or birds' feet, may be cleaned with a soft microfiber cloth or brush. Some birds' feet may be artificially colored and will not react well if solvents are applied.

==== Bone, horns and antler objects ====
Horns that are starting to crack may be treated with conservation-grade beeswax polish that will help protect against dehydration. Beaks are another component of taxidermy specimens that are typically artificially colored and should only be cleaned with brushes and soft clothes.

==== Glass components ====
Taxidermy specimens have glass eyes that can be gently cleaned with glass cleaner.

=== Repair and restoration techniques ===
If a taxidermy specimen has been significantly damaged, conservators may have to use more thorough and sometimes invasive techniques to restore them. These techniques can help to stabilize the specimen's condition while also restoring the appearance to be more scientifically accurate. Before undertaking any repairs, conservators use a variety of imaging techniques, such as photography and x-rays, to get a good idea of the structure and level of damage of the specimen.

==== Structural repair ====
Fill materials may be used on taxidermy specimens to correct areas of loss. It is important that the specimen is in stable condition because many fill materials have drawbacks that can further damage the specimen. Fills typically consist of a backing made of inert fabric combined with a resin, starch, or cellulose ether. For example, bird specimens that have been badly damaged by pests may be repaired with a mixture of synthetic fabrics and wheat starch. This mixture is used to infill areas of loss and feathers are replaced where possible with a wheat starch paste adhesive. In addition to infilling, taxidermy specimens may require structural repairs. Small specimens that have experienced loss of a head or appendage, a new wire armature may be inserted into the specimen in order to remount the broken piece. Adhesive can be used to further secure the broken piece to its original body.

==== Recoloring fur ====
A relatively recent development in taxidermy restoration, metal complex dyes have been used to recolor fur. The American Museum of Natural History performed extensive research and tests using these dyes to recolor the furs of taxidermy specimens during the restoration of the Hall of North American Mammals. Many of the dyes have a high lightfastness and are more resistant to fading. When applied to fur, they also allow for a more natural look and feel. Another major benefit to using dyes, as opposed to acrylic paints, to recolor fur is they are reversible. The dyes can be reduced or entirely removed with application of ethanol. Research is still being done into the dyes' lightfastness and fixability, as well as whether or not they cause the fur to degrade over time.

==== Diorama repair ====
3D printing is a newer method being used to replace foliage in some dioramas because it can quickly replicate hundreds of leaves.

==== Pest treatments ====
Pests may be treated with a number of methods, including freezing, insecticide, or anoxia. These treatments help kill off adults and larvae, though specimens may require additional cleaning and stabilization after these treatments are performed.

== Preventive care and maintenance ==
In order to prolong the life of a taxidermy specimen, it is necessary for museums and conservators to implement preventive care and maintenance strategies. These strategies help protect specimens from damage caused by humidity, temperature, pests, humans, and more.

=== Proper storage and display conditions ===
One of the most effective ways to prevent damage from occurring to taxidermy collections is to establish a monitoring system or procedure that routinely checks the condition of specimens. When not on display, taxidermy specimens should be housed in well-sealed cabinets or cases. Metal cabinets may be made of aluminum and/or stainless steel with an epoxy powder coating and are effective at preventing pest and light damage. Wood cabinets can provide better protection from fluctuations in relative humidity, though they off-gas chemicals that may damage collections. Though it is essential for cabinets and cases to be well-sealed, they should also allow for minimal airflow to prevent off-gassed chemicals or humidity from building up inside the container. For taxidermy specimens housed on open shelving, a polythene sheet can provide temporary protection from pollutants, though dust may accumulate electrostatically (2). Controlled lighting conditions with UV filters are important for reducing fading in taxidermy specimens. Specimens should be regularly rotated in order to reduce light damage. 50–100 lux is the recommended light exposure for taxidermy, though some types of feathers are susceptible to damage at 50 lux. The maximum annual exposure levels for biological specimens, feathers, fur, and leather is 180,000 lux hours. In the span of one year, a taxidermy mount will fade half as much if displayed in low light compared to the same conditions in high light. Ideal relative humidity conditions for taxidermy specimens are 40% minimum and 55% maximum. An integrated pest management system is important to manage and monitor pests that can damage collections.

=== Proper handling ===
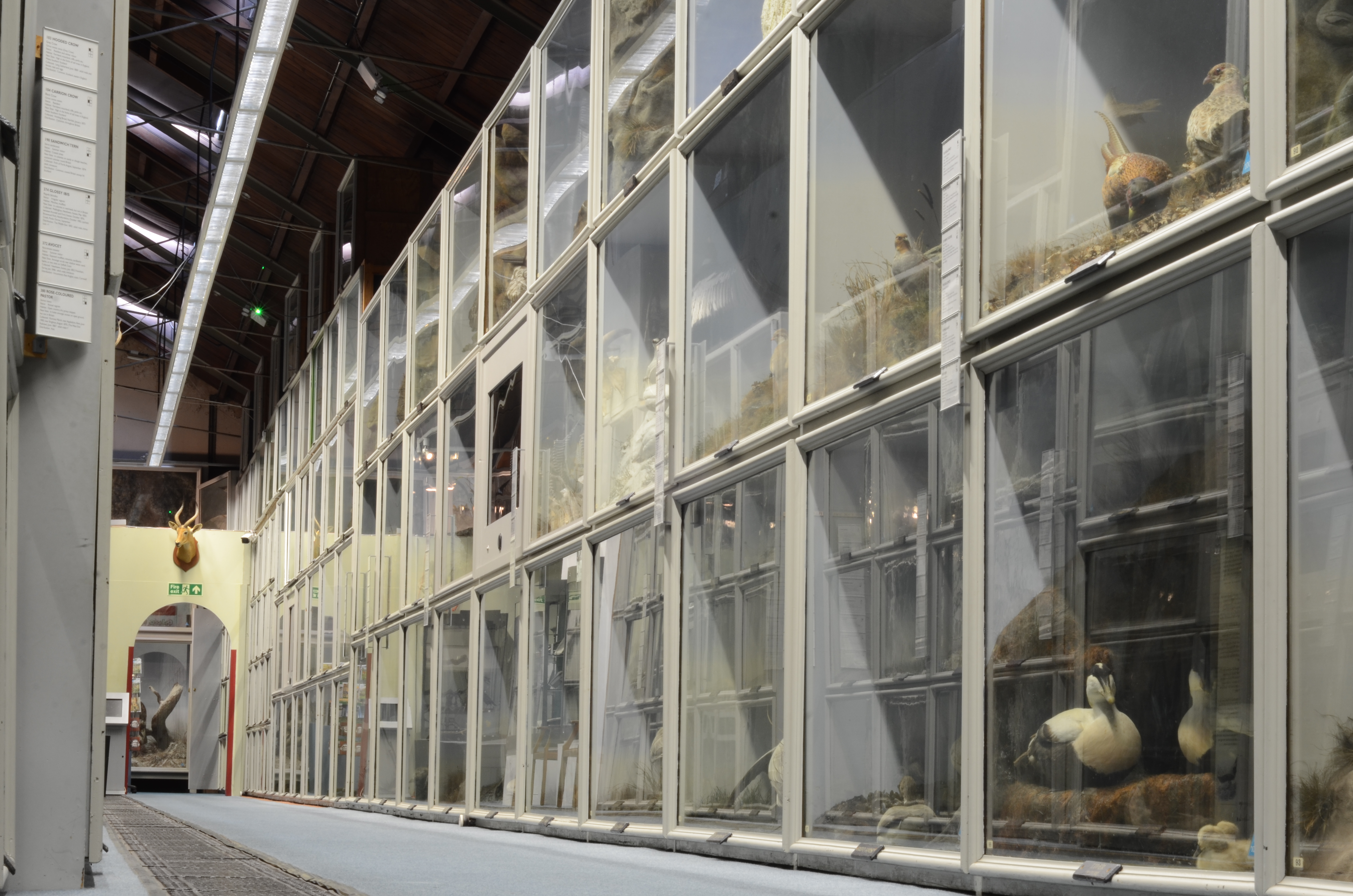
Wall of Mr E.T. Booth's taxidermy diorama cases depicting British birds in recreations of their natural habitat, as seen at the Booth Museum of Natural History, 2019

Proper handling techniques are essential to protect specimens from damage. Conservators will inspect taxidermy specimens for signs of weakness or detachable parts before moving the object. It is important for anyone handling taxidermy to remove jewelry, such as watches, rings, or bracelets, that may scratch or snag parts of the specimen. If the taxidermy specimen is mounted on a base or in a tray, it is preferred to only handle the base or tray while moving the object, rather than the specimen itself. Conservators will also use a secondary support, such as padding, to support the taxidermy specimen while in transit. Wearing nitrile gloves while handling specimens will help prevent oil and perspiration transfer.

=== Packing and shipping ===
Bases of taxidermy mounts should be affixed to a shipping container with screws, straps, staples or tapes, with light and loose packing materials supporting the specimen's structure. This keeps the specimen stable during shipment, and informs the receiver which way the specimen is oriented within the container. Additionally, polystyrene or polyethylene bags may be used to cover taxidermy specimens during shipment.

== Examples ==
=== American Museum of Natural History mammal hall ===
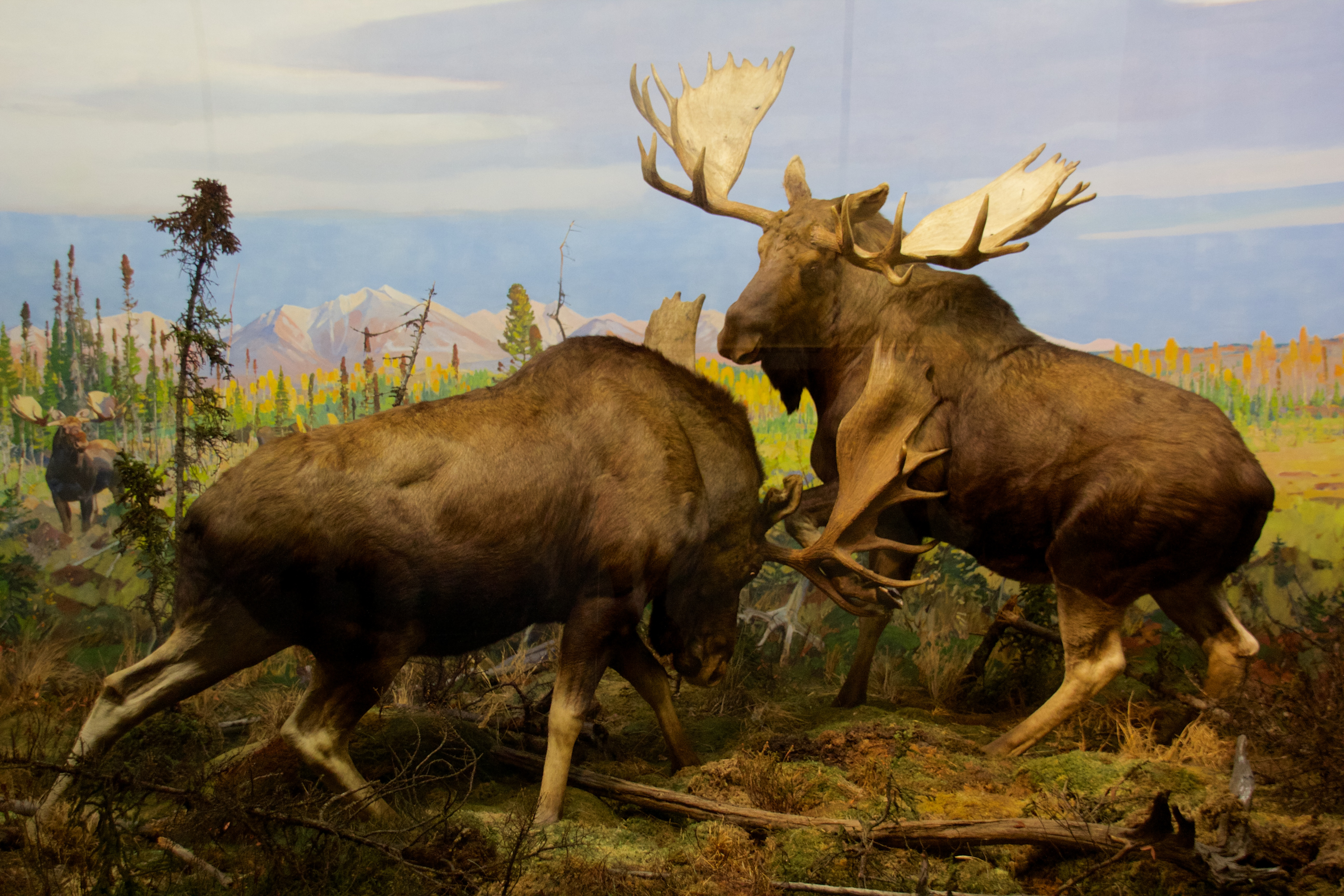
Alaska moose diorama at the American Museum of Natural History in 2012, after restoration

In 2011–2012, the American Museum of Natural History undertook the restoration of 43 dioramas in its Bernard Family Hall of North American Mammals. In addition to repairing mounts, conservators worked on restoring the dioramas' set pieces and background paintings. In order to restore the taxidermy mounts and specimens, conservators removed smaller animals from the dioramas and built temporary scaffolding around larger animals, such as the 500-pound bison. Many of the larger mounts are affixed to their diorama case and could not easily be moved without risking further damage. One of the main goals of the project was to bring back scientific accuracy to the specimens, including their fur coloring. The museum's conservators tested and developed a new method of treatment for recoloring furs that uses metal dyes instead of traditional materials, such as paints and hair dyes. Other details of specimens were updated and restored - the cougar's whiskers were replaced with porcupine quills to give the face a fuller appearance and veins were added to the antelope jackrabbit's ears to give a realistic appearance. In order to protect the restored taxidermy specimens and dioramas, UV-filtered lights were installed throughout the mammal hall.

=== National Postal Museum's "Owney" ===
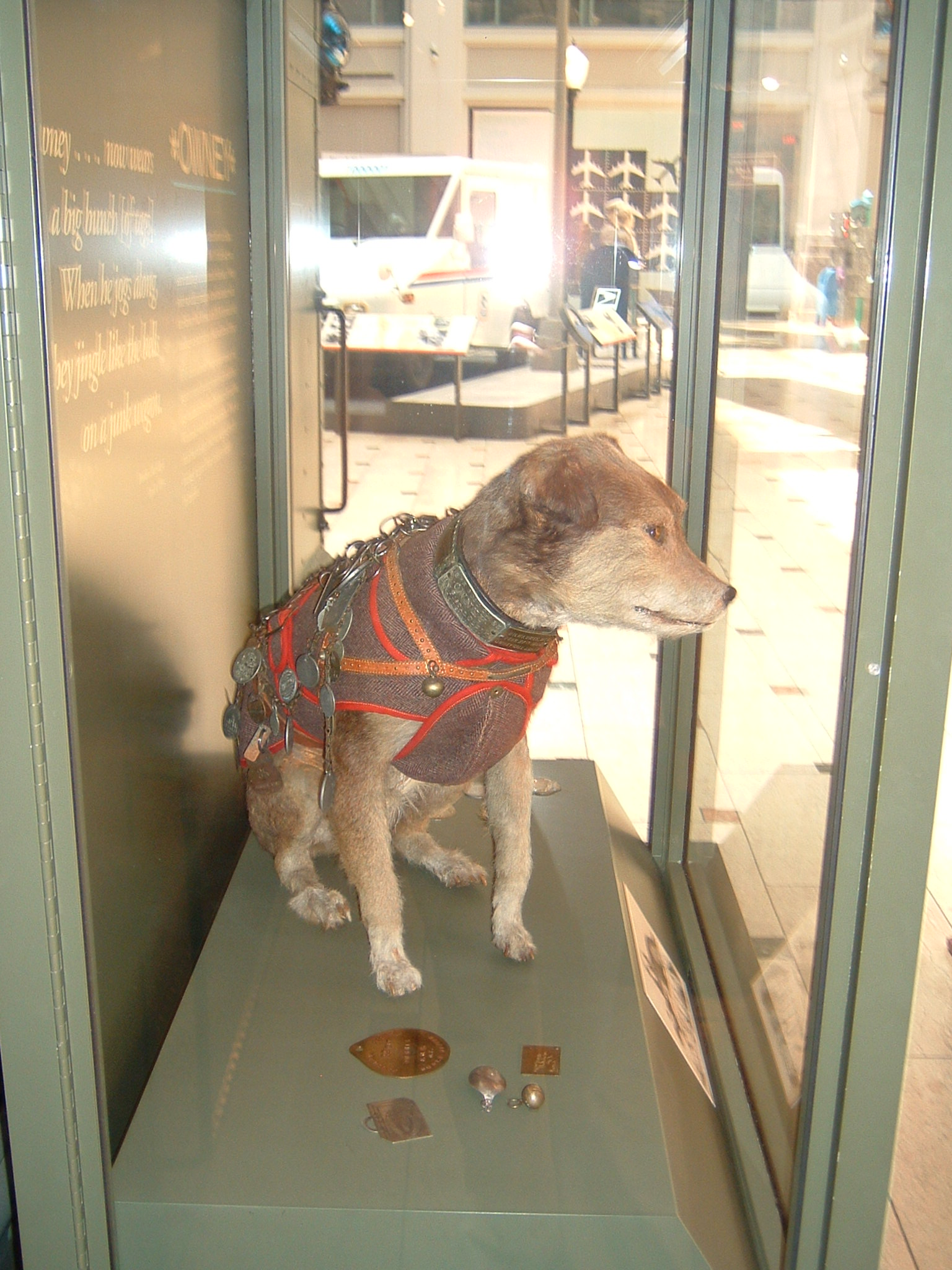
Owney, before treatments

In 2011, the Smithsonian's National Postal Museum restored its beloved "Owney", the canine mascot of the Railway Mail Service. Owney was taxidermied in 1897 and had undergone previous restoration attempts. Using new methods and treatments, conservators removed dust, built-up wax, paint, and traces of arsenic. They also reshaped his face to be more accurate based on photographic evidence, as well as replaced his vest with a more accurate leather harness. As a result of the restoration, Owney's fur is fuller, his tail is fluffier, and he has a more historically accurate appearance.

=== Napoleon's horse "Vizir" ===
Almost 200 years old, Vizir was one of Napoleon Bonaparte's horses, and its mount has been on display at the Musee de l'Armee in Paris. The horse was showing significant signs of deterioration and a campaign was launched to fund its restoration. Conservators and taxidermists worked to rehydrate the skin, repair tears in the body, and restore coloration to the fur. Once the treatments were completed, Vizir was placed in a climate-controlled case to prevent further deterioration.

=== Henry the Elephant ===
The Smithsonian National Museum of Natural History revamped its main rotunda in 2015, and restored its centerpiece elephant, Henry, which has been on display since 1959. Previous restorations have been performed, including one in the 1970s that involved replacing the tusks with fiberglass replicas to reduce stress on the specimen. The elephant was dusted and vacuumed to remove debris, then waxes were used to infill cracks and make other repairs. The skin was retextured and recolored to more closely resemble an elephant hide.
