= History of taxidermy =

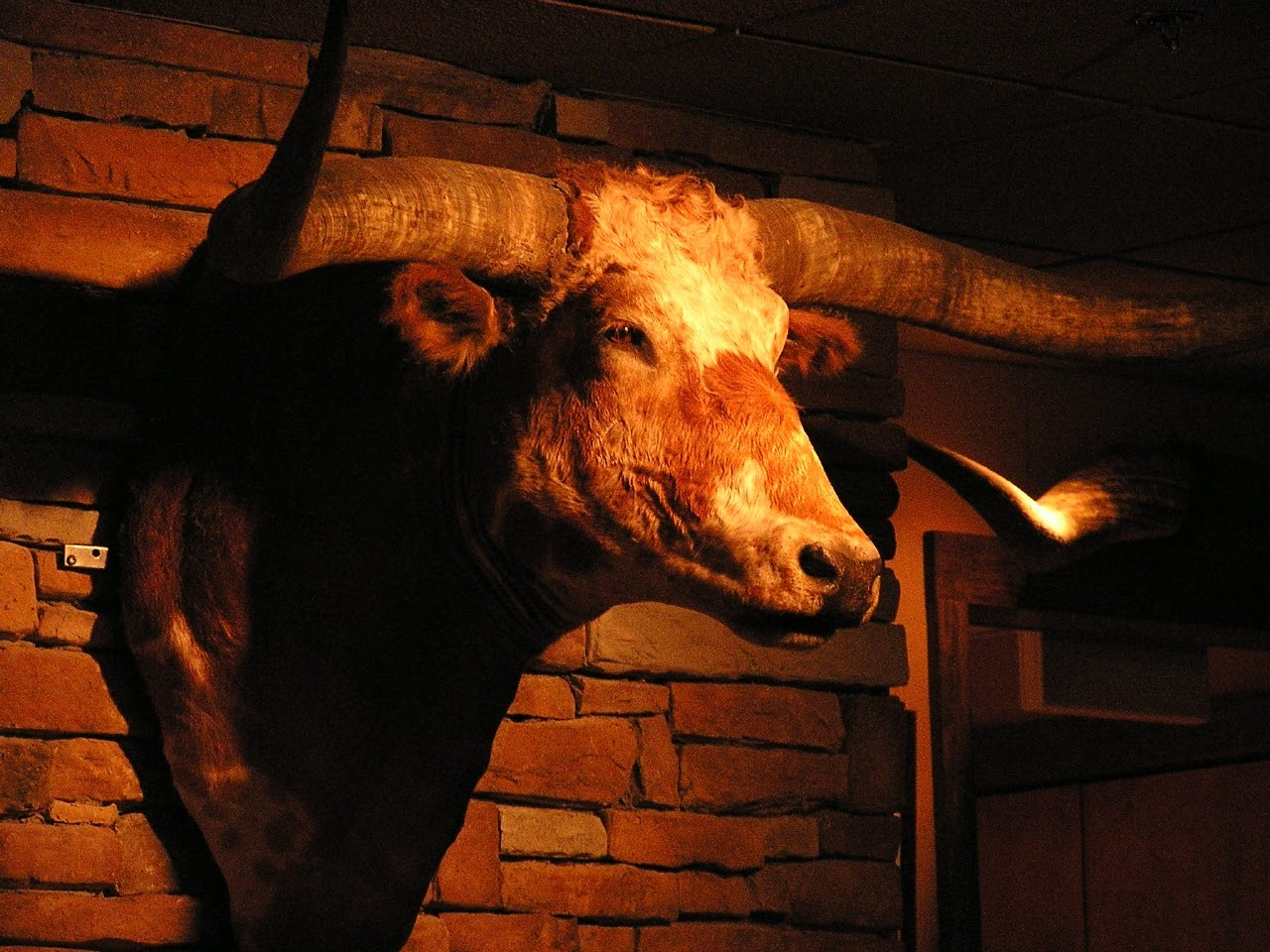
Longhorn Head Wall Mount at Landmark Center LongHorn Steakhouse Boston 2003

Taxidermy, or the process of preserving animal skin together with its feathers, fur, or scales, is an art whose existence has been short compared to forms such as painting, sculpture, and music. The word derives from two Greek words: taxis, meaning order, preparation, and arrangement and derma, meaning skin. Directly translated, taxidermy means "skin art."

According to John W. Moyer, a staff member at the Chicago Field Museum of Natural History famous for his comprehensive studies on the development of this process, in his book Practical Taxidermy, the modern form of taxidermy greatly differs from the taxidermy of antiquity. In ancient times, although considered some form of "art," it was a process of animal preservation; in contrast, modern taxidermy methods seek to produce lifelike mounts of wildlife by accurately modeling the anatomy of animal specimens as they might appear in their natural habitat. According to Albert B. Farnham, in his book Home Taxidermy for Pleasure and Profit, although its methods greatly differ over time, the art reveals that there existed then as now the desire to preserve the trophy of the hunter's prowess and skill in natural objects.

== Early forms of taxidermy ==
=== Ancient Egyptians ===
As documented in Frederick H. Hitchcock's 19th-century manual entitled Practical Taxidermy, the earliest known taxidermists were the ancient Egyptians and despite the fact that they never removed skins from animals as a whole, it was the Egyptians who developed one of the world's earliest forms of animal preservation through the use of injections, spices, oils, and other embalming tools. As early as 2200 BC, they embalmed the bodies of dogs, cats, monkeys, birds, sheep, oxen, and any other pets of Egyptian royalty and buried them in their Pharaoh's tomb. This art of embalming was effective, not for the purpose of having the specimens look natural or for exhibition, but to satisfy the tradition of the times. Likewise, according to Thomas Brown, a 19th-century naturalist and malacologist, "Egyptian preservation attempts were prepared in such a manner as to produce no pleasurable sensations in examining them; instead, they were remarkable only for their great antiquity and spiritual beliefs." Though these people did not seek to preserve animals for modeling their anatomy as they might appear in a natural setting, the ancient Egyptians’ ability to preserve the carcasses of animals as immense as the hippopotamus (a mummy of which was discovered in Thebes) reflect the veracity of these early textual claims to the art's earliest roots.

=== Carthaginian Empire ===
Other instances of ancient roots in taxidermy date as far back as five centuries B.C. in the record of the African explorations of Hanno the Carthaginian. Within the past five centuries, an account is given of the discovery of what were evidently gorillas and the subsequent preservation of their skins, which were hung in the temple of Astarte where they remained until the taking of Carthage in the year 146 B.C.

=== Western/Central Europe ===
The people of Greece, Rome, ancient Britain, and other northern lands could be said to have practiced a form of taxidermy in the tanning of skins used for clothing. Because they had no other means of covering their bodies, early Europeans developed methods of preserving the skins of lions, tigers, wolves, and bears for survival.

=== Native Americans ===
Much like the people of Greece, Rome, and northern Europe, many Native American tribes such as the Sioux, Cherokee, Pottawatomie, and Cheyenne preserved the skins of foxes, raccoons, bears, buffalo, porcupines, and eagles to produce and decorate their clothing, tools, and equipment. To this day, remnants of such Native American tribes continue this early form of taxidermy in tanning and preserving animal carcasses for traditional and cultural purposes.

== Early European developments in modern taxidermy ==
As Western European societies transitioned into the early modern period, a shift toward textile manufacturing for clothing decreased the demand for hide tanning – taxidermy in one of its earliest forms. Consequently, Western Europe witnessed the rise of modern taxidermy, or the modeling the anatomy of various animals in their natural habitats. As taxidermy developed into its modern form, its growth in popularity paralleled the growth of modern naturalistic exhibition.

=== Birds in the Netherlands ===
About 400 years ago, the first mounting attempt on record included the preservation of birds in the Netherlands. As reported, a wealthy Dutch trader obtained an aviary of exotic birds that were brought back from the East Indies. Due to the neglect of the bird keeper, every bird died of suffocation; but as the owner wished to keep their skins and plumage for display, they were skinned and preserved with spices brought to Holland, also from the East Indies. The skins were then wired and stuffed with cotton and tow and were ultimately posed in natural positions.

=== Rhinoceros in Florence ===
Though the preservation of bird skins from the East Indies is the first officially recorded mounting attempt, the Royal Museum of Vertebrates, located in Florence, Italy, poses a mounted rhinoceros believed to date back as early as 1500. Though the exact method of preservation of the animal's skin is unknown, it is believed that the skull and leg bones were used to set up the animal's frame on a wood armature and were then stuffed.

=== Crocodile in Switzerland ===
Another specimen that was prepared during the birth of modern taxidermy is a mounted crocodile 10 to 12 feet long from Egypt that has been on exhibit at the Museum at St. Gall in Switzerland since 1627. Like the rhinoceros, the exact methods of how the crocodile was mounted are unknown. However, the specimen has never been kept under glass, which reveals the success of modern taxidermy, even in its earliest years.

== Developments in 18th- and 19th-century Europe ==
=== Royal Academy of Vienna ===
One of the first published works on taxidermy is found in Natural History, published by the Royal Academy of Vienna in the beginning of the 18th century. Containing a treatise on the dissection of birds and animals, the work also makes reference to the preservation of birds in the Netherlands more than a century before.

=== R. A. F. de Reaumur ===
According to John W. Moyer in another one of his works for Encyclopedia Americana, one of the earliest published works on taxidermy is R. A. F. de Reaumur's Treatise, which was published in 1749. In this work, Reaumur discussed the preservation of skins of birds; however, because his plan was simply to mount birds with wires – as had been done over two centuries before – it did not find much favor among other taxidermists. Instead, his method spurred the development of a new system of preservation in which one cut the skins longitudinally into halves, filled one half with plaster, fixing the skin to a backboard, inserting an eye, painting on a beak and legs, and then mounting the bird in a framework of glass. For the next several decades, this process became the standard method of European taxidermists.

=== British Museum ===
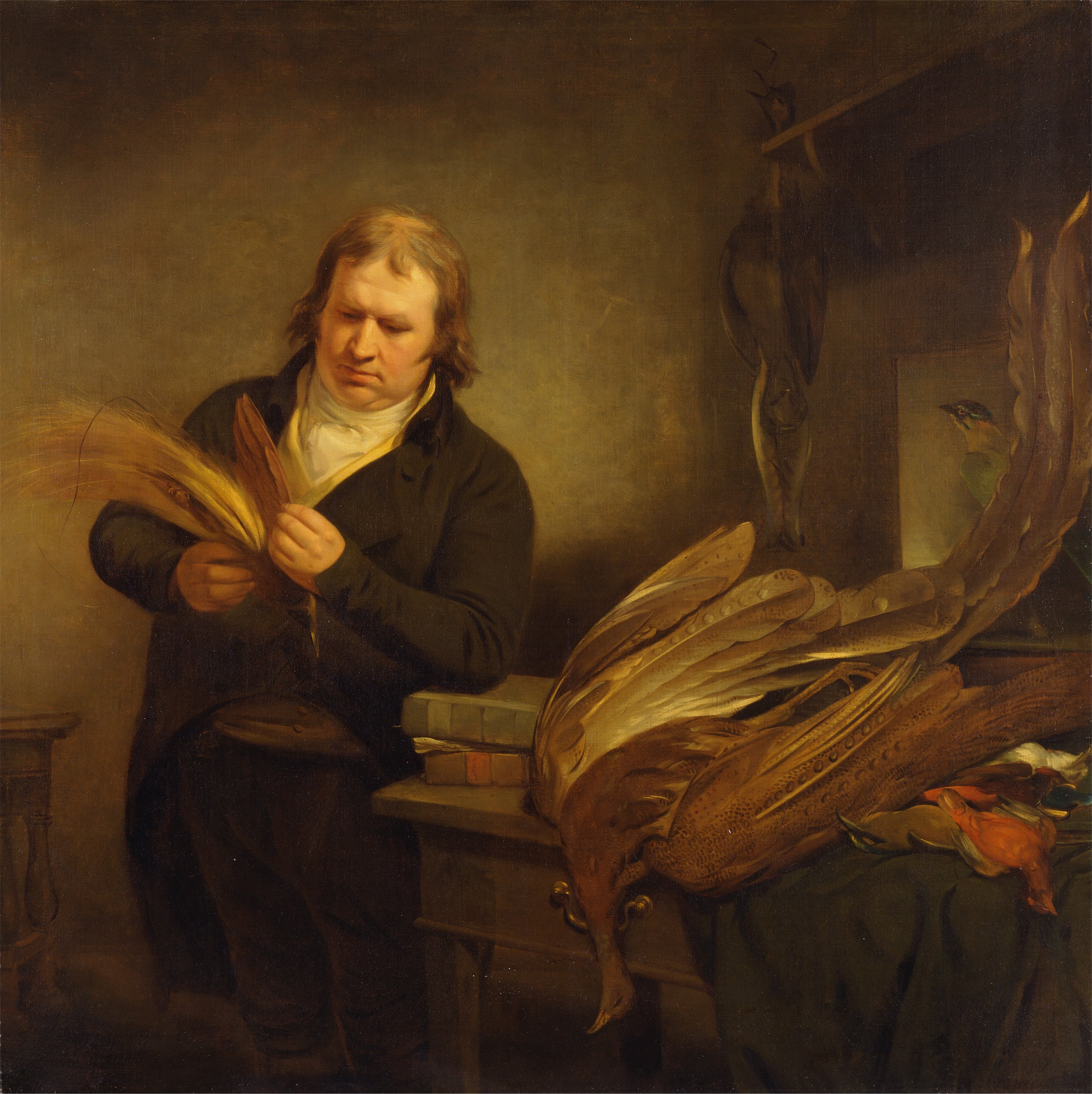
Mr. Thomson, Animal and Bird Preserver to the Leverian and British Museum in 1802

After rising to prominence in 1759, the British Museum, which, was then known as the Montagu House, contained the world's largest collection of animal skins in the 18th- and early 19th-century, displaying a total of 1886 mammals, 1172 birds, 521 reptiles, and 1555 fishes; however, a great proportion of these were not stuffed specimens, but simply bones and preparations of skins. Soon after the Museum's opening, these natural history collections drew a great deal of interest from the public, thus demonstrating the rise in popularity of the art into the 1800s.

Following the restoration of peace in Europe after 1815, Great Britain witnessed continued growth in the Museum's status as naturalists and taxidermists found that the public had then time and the inclination to devote themselves to such collections.

Perhaps the most notable event that provided an impetus to a more accurate, realistic modeling of specimens in their natural settings was the Great Exhibition of 1851 in London. Displaying a plethora of exhibits from all around the world in various forms, it was the first time in history where taxidermists from across the world gathered together and presented modern, innovative methods pertaining to the art.

=== Rowland Ward studio ===
In the late 1800s, British taxidermists established the Rowland Ward studio in London; the individuals who worked there are credited with many improved methods in taxidermy. It was at Ward's that the Lion and Tiger struggle (despite its unnatural display of history) was designed and mounted, and was then considered the finest animal exhibit of ancient or modern times. This display was initially moved to an exhibit in Paris, but was soon returned to the Sydenham Crystal Palace in London.

=== Jules Verreaux ===
Following the creation of the Lion and Tiger exhibit, a prominent French taxidermist named Jules Verreaux mounted another animal group, though different in design. Entitled The Courier, the display depicted the figure of an Arab man (presumably formed from some type of wax) seated upon a stuffed camel being attacked by two lions. This spectacle was first exhibited at the Paris Fair of 1867 and was later purchased by the American Museum of Natural History. Like the Lion and Tiger display, Verreaux's work – along with those of other European taxidermists such as Edwin Ward – demonstrated the development of taxidermy into its modern form as its artists paid a greater deal of attention to animals’ anatomical movements and features.

=== Influence of Victorian society ===
Although the French and Germans progressed in the practice of taxidermy prior to the Great Exhibition of 1851 in London, the English made several improvements in methodology and skill in the years that followed. Much of this can be attributed to the culture of Victorian Society. According to Paul Farber, a researcher at the University of Chicago, in his book The Development of Taxidermy and the History of Ornithology, the art of taxidermy was first brought into popular regard by the Victorians, who were enthralled by all tokens of exotic travel, especially to any domesticated representations of wilderness. Whether it was having a glassed-in miniature rain forest on the tea table or a mounted antelope by the front door, members of the elite class relished the art as a manifestation of one's knowledge, wealth, and artistry. As Victorian English society reached its pinnacle near the end of the 19th-century, technique and methodology of the art progressed; however, compared to modern standards, poses were still fairly stiff and expressionless.

== Developments in United States: 19th-century to present ==
=== John Scudder ===
One of the pioneers in early American taxidermy, a man named John Scudder succeeded to the proprietorship of Gardner Baker's American Museum, which had been founded in New York in 1791 by the Tammany Society. The museum was later acquired by P. T. Barnum and was soon reestablished as Barnum's American Museum in 1842. Scudder's successor, Titian Peale, who was appointed assistant manager of the Philadelphia Museum in 1821, also made important contributions to early taxidermy exhibits. Though Scudder and Peale did not contribute any known innovations in the art's technique or methodology, their museum work in New York and Philadelphia paved the way for the development of modern American taxidermy in the decades that followed.

=== Ward's Natural Science Museum ===
Though taxidermy's early roots developed in Africa and Western Europe, modern-day taxidermy began in the United States in 1861 when Henry Augustus Ward's Natural Science Establishment was founded in Rochester, New York. Modern-day taxidermists often give credit to this establishment for placing taxidermy on a level with other allied arts and beginning a new era in museum exhibitions. Many later taxidermists, whose work was among the most advanced exhibited, could credit their careers to Ward's Establishment, and many present museums have display collections built around these early Ward specimens.

It was at Ward's that the Society of American Taxidermists was founded on March 24, 1880. This society, the first of its kind in the United States, published scholarly reports and held three competitive exhibitions: the first in Rochester on December 14–18, 1880; the second in Boston on December 14–21, 1881; and the third in New York City on April 30-May 5, 1883. Terminated after the last exhibit in 1883, "the society in three years had done more for taxidermy and the natural history museum in general in the United States than had ever previously been accomplished." Founded by America's most skilled taxidermists of the day, the Society presented to the public modern methods and techniques, which were freely discussed and served to bring about a higher standard of commercial work and museum exhibits. It was during this time in which the "stuffing" of animals transformed into a purely elaborate art form. In addition, this institution generated many famous taxidermists and naturalists such as William T. Hornaday, Frederic S. Webster, John Martens, Carl E. Akeley, Joseph Palmer, William J. Critchley, Thomas W. Fraine, and J.F.D. Bailey.

=== Carl E. Akeley ===
By the early part of the twentieth century, following the termination of Ward's Society of American Taxidermists, individuals such as Akeley, Hornaday, and Leon Pray had refined techniques and begun emphasizing artistry. Akeley, specifically, is responsible for devising a method of mounting that is now standard. In this process, "the true contours of the specimen are preserved by making a clay model, exactly duplicating the animal's muscle structure, over an armature that includes the original skeleton or parts of it. A plaster mold is then made, from which is produced a light, durable frame that holds the skin in position. Synthetic materials, especially celluloid, are now often used to reproduce the true color and translucence of such specimens as reptiles and fishes."

However, as the techniques of taxidermy became more realistic, the more mounted displays discomfited viewers; instead of expressionless moose heads mounted onto a wall of a building, artists began mounting specimens such as bobcats pouncing in midair. Therefore, as a result, for the next several decades, taxidermy existed in the margins – practitioners were located sporadically throughout the United States, often self-taught, and usually known only by word of mouth.

=== A 20th-century revival ===
After years of disorganization and scattered existence, American taxidermy witnessed a sudden rebirth in the early 1970s. Taxidermy schools opened, igniting hopes of success in prospective artists. In 1971, for instance, the National Taxidermy Association was formed after years of unsuccessful organization. Similarly, in 1974, a trade magazine called Taxidermy Review began sponsoring national competitions. For the first time in history, American taxidermists had a chance to collaborate and discuss specific processes in the taxidermy process such as gluing tongues into jaw sets or accurately measuring the carcass of a squirrel. The majority of such techniques are still used in taxidermy shops today, allowing practitioners to prepare specimens as realistically as possible.

== Taxidermy and American social life ==
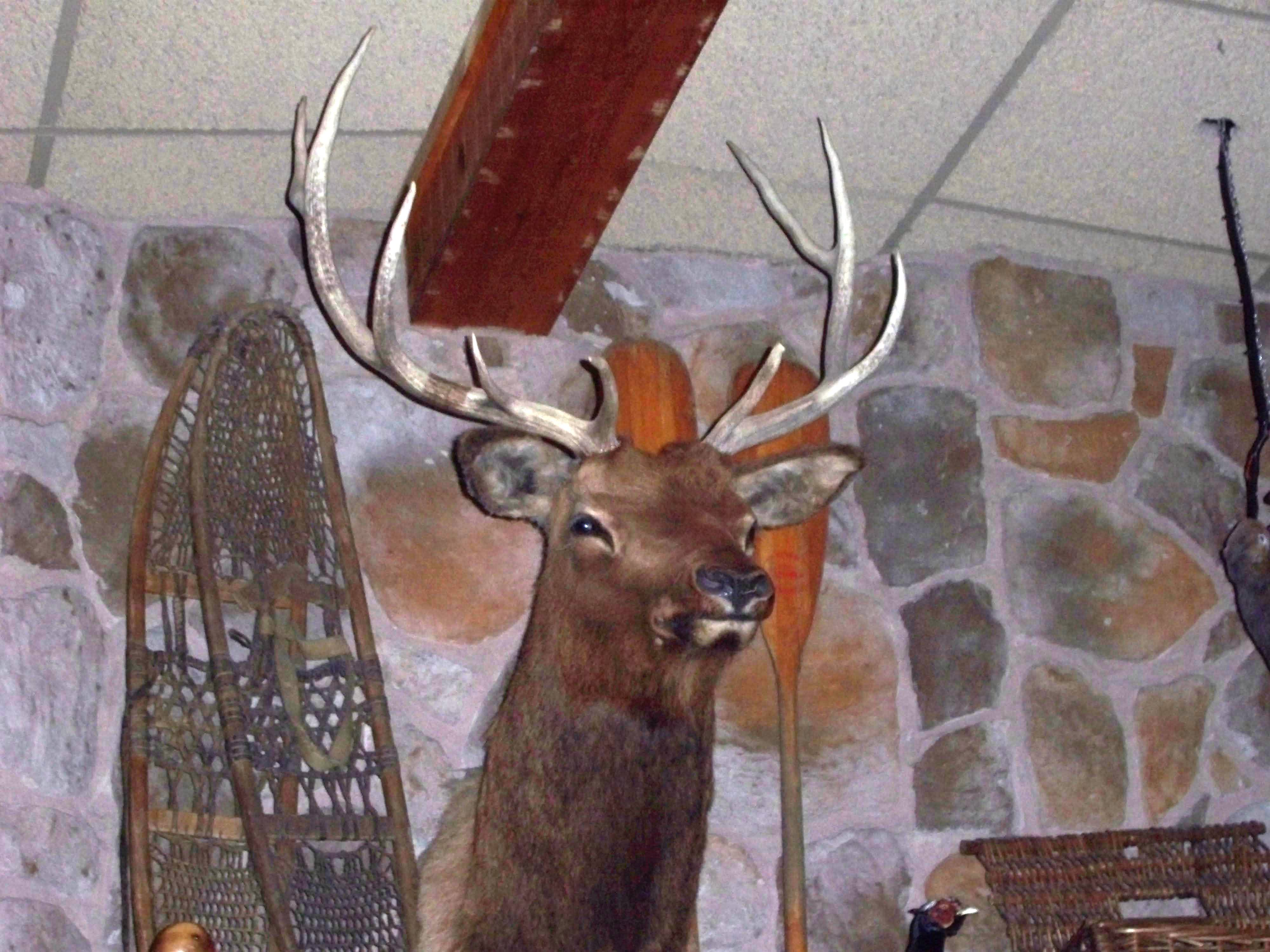
Stag Head Wall Mount Bugaboo Creek Steakhouse, Massachusetts 2008

American culture reflects its preoccupation with taxidermy in a variety of ways. Various words and phrases used in everyday life are derived from the vocabulary of taxidermy—the threat to "beat the 'stuffing' out of someone" or derogatorily referring to someone as a "stuffed shirt," meaning that they are fake or artificially pompous. It has also manifested itself in popular television shows such as in the Scrubs where the protagonists have a "pet" stuffed dog, and in The Office where Dwight offers to have his taxidermist stuff Angela's deceased cat.

Taxidermy has also been institutionalized as an American folk craft. At one time, it was listed in the Boy Scouts of America Handbook as one of the skills which, when mastered, could earn a merit badge. The Merit Badge of Taxidermy was first introduced in 1911 and included in the Handbook through 1954, during which 10,344 scouts earned the badge. In 1954, the taxidermy badge was dropped from the merit badge series because of the "lack of interest."

Many Americans have acquired their expertise in taxidermy via mail-order lessons and commenced their artistic careers with the carcass of a sparrow or squirrel. Many prominent Americans, such as the noted painter Charles Willson Peale and the famous military leader George Armstrong Custer, were enthusiastic taxidermists. The art has enjoyed a pervasive integration into the fabric of American social life as practitioners are found in practically every small town in America. Specimens are widely employed in home and store decorations, for business advertising, for sporting trophies, and perhaps, most importantly, reifying the notion that humans can symbolically "restore" life to dead animals — thereby, in a sense, demonstrating our perceived human power over death.

== Faux Taxidermy ==
Faux Taxidermy has been a modern phenomenon in home decor and decorating since the 2010s. In 2013, the Huffington post noted that decorating with sculpted fake animal heads painted in different colors had become a popular trend in interior design.

== Sources ==
- Barrow, Mark V. Journal in the History of Biology. 3rd ed. Vol. 33. Netherlands: Kluwer Academic, 2001.
- Brown, Thomas. The Taxidermist's Manual. 11th ed. London: A. Fullarton & Co., 1853.
- Bryant, Clifton D. and Donald J. Shoemaker. "Dead Zoo Chic: Some Conceptual Notes on Taxidermy in American Social Life." Handbook of Death and Dying. Ed. Clifton D. Bryant. Vol. 2: The Response to Death. Thousand Oaks, CA: Sage Reference, 2003. 1019–1026. Gale Virtual Reference Library. Gale. Brigham Young University — Utah. 19 Sept. 2009 <http://go.galegroup.com/ps/start.do?p=GVRL&u=byu_main>.
- Farber, Paul L. The Development of Taxidermy and the History of Ornithology. 4th ed. Vol. 68. Chicago: The University of Chicago P, 1977.
- Farnham, Albert B. Home Taxidermy for Pleasure and Profit. New York: A.R. Harding Company, 1944.
- Hitchcock, Frederick H., ed. Practical Taxidermy. 2nd ed. New York: The Grafton P.
- Moyer, John W. Practical Taxidermy. 2nd ed. New York: John Wiley & Sons, Inc., 1979.
- Moyer, John W. "Taxidermy." Encyclopedia Americana. 2009. Grolier Online. 17 Sept. 2009 <http://ea.grolier.com/article?id=0380470-00>.
- Orlean, Susan. "LIFELIKE." The New Yorker. 79.15 (9 June 2003): p046. Literature Resource Center. Gale. Brigham Young University — Utah. 17 Sept. 2009 <http://go.galegroup.com/ps/start.do?p=LitRC&u=byuprovo>.
- "Taxidermy." Microsoft Encarta Online Encyclopedia 2009. 2009. Microsoft Corporation. 17 Sept. 2009. <https://web.archive.org/web/20090829032928/http://encarta.msn.com/encyclopedia_761556049/Taxidermy.html>.
- "Taxidermy." The Columbia Encyclopedia, Sixth Edition. 2008. Encyclopedia.com. 17 Sep. 2009 <http://www.encyclopedia.com>.
- https://www.huffingtonpost.com/2013/05/09/faux-taxidermy-decor_n_3245609.html
- https://www.wallcharmers.com/
