= Moravian enclaves in Silesia =

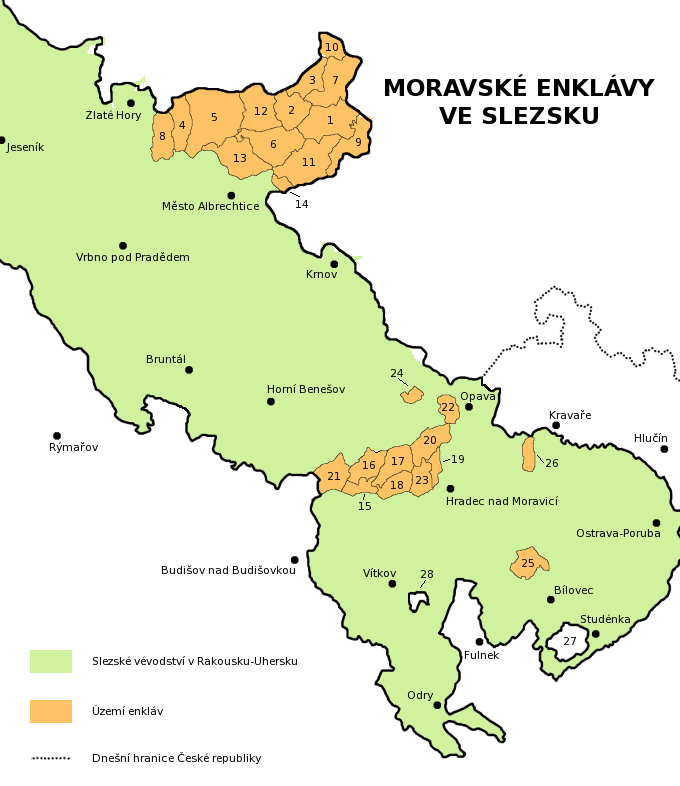
Moravian enclaves in Silesia (in orange)

The Moravian enclaves in Silesia were parts of Moravia but, from 1783 until 1928, they were governed by Silesian authorities according to Moravian legislation. They ceased to exist on December 1, 1928 with the creation of the Land of Moravia and Silesia.

== Territories of enclaves ==
- 1) municipality of Bohušov, (2) municipality of Dívčí Hrad, (3) municipality of Hlinka, (4) municipality of Janov, (5) municipality of Jindřichov, (6) municipality of Liptaň, (7) municipality of Osoblaha, (8) municipality of Petrovice, (9) most of the municipality of Rusín, (10) most of the municipality of Slezské Pavlovice, (11) municipality of Slezské Rudoltice, (12) municipality of Vysoká; cadastral areas: (13) Piskořov (part of the municipality of Město Albrechtice) and (14) Třemešná (part of the municipality of Třemešná).
- (15) municipality of Lhotka u Litultovic, (16) most of the municipality of Litultovice (without its settlement of Choltice), (17) municipality of Dolní Životice, (18) municipality of Mikolajice, (19) municipality of Uhlířov, (20) municipality of Slavkov; cadastral areas: (21) Deštné (part of the municipality of Jakartovice), (22) Jaktař (part of the municipality of Opava), (23) Štáblovice (part of the municipality of Štáblovice).
- (24) most of the cadastral area of Vlaštovičky (part of the municipality of Opava).
- (25) municipality of Slatina including its former settlements of Ohrada (part of the municipality of Bílovec) and Karlovice (part of the municipality of Tísek).
- (26) most of the cadastral area of Suché Lazce (part of the municipality of Opava), without its settlement of Přerovec, but including its former settlement of Kravařov (part of the municipality of Opava).

The cadastral areas of Butovice (27) (part of the municipality of Studénka) and Nové Vrbno (28) (part of the municipality of Větřkovice) were not part of the Moravian enclaves in Silesia but an integral part of Moravia.
