= Gmina Lubrza, Opole Voivodeship =

Gmina Lubrza Lubrza Commune
- Gmina
- Flag Coat of arms
- Interactive map of Gmina Lubrza
- Coordinates (Lubrza): 50°20′9″N 17°37′34″E
- Country: Poland
- Voivodeship: Opole
- County: Prudnik
- Seat: Lubrza

Area
  - Total: 83.15 km^{2} (32.10 sq mi)

Population (2019-06-30)
  - Total: 4,324
  - Density: 52.00/km^{2} (134.7/sq mi)
- Website: https://lubrza.opole.pl/

Gmina Lubrza is a rural gmina (administrative district) in Prudnik County, Opole Voivodeship, in south-western Poland, on the Czech border. Its seat is the village of Lubrza, which lies approximately 4 kilometres (2 mi) east of Prudnik and 43 km (27 mi) south-west of the regional capital Opole.

The gmina covers an area of 83.15 square kilometres (32.1 sq mi), and as of 2019 its total population is 4,324.

The gmina contains part of the protected area called Opawskie Mountains Landscape Park.

== Villages ==
Gmina Lubrza contains the villages and settlements of Dobroszowice, Dytmarów, Dytmarów-Stacja, Jasiona, Krzyżkowice, Laskowice, Lubrza, Nowy Browiniec, Olszynka, Prężynka, Skrzypiec, Słoków and Trzebina.

== Neighbouring gminas ==
Gmina Lubrza is bordered by the gminas of Biała, Głogówek and Prudnik. It also borders the Czech Republic.

== Twin towns – sister cities ==
Gmina Lubrza is twinned with:

- Dívčí Hrad, Czech Republic
- Hlinka, Czech Republic
- Liptaň, Czech Republic
- Město Albrechtice, Czech Republic
- Slezské Pavlovice, Czech Republic
- Vysoká, Czech Republic
