= Osoblažsko =

Microregion in the Czech Republic

Osoblažsko (literally Osoblaha Region, German: Hotzenplotzer Ländchen, Polish: Ziemia osobłoska) is a microregion in the Bruntál District in the northernmost part of the Moravian-Silesian Region of the Czech Republic. The microregion is also called Osoblaha Hook or Silesian Hanakia. It is bounded by mountain ridges of Eastern Sudetes from the west and the Polish border from the east and north.

== Municipalities ==
As of January 2022, the population was 9,440 inhabitants. The area of Osoblažsko consists of 14 municipalities, with two of them being towns:

- Bohušov
- Dívčí Hrad
- Hlinka
- Janov
- Jindřichov
- Liptaň
- Město Albrechtice
- Osoblaha
- Rusín
- Slezské Pavlovice
- Slezské Rudoltice
- Petrovice
- Třemešná
- Vysoká

=== Association of Municipalities of Osoblažsko ===
All the municipalities in Osoblažsko are members of the Association of Municipalities of Osoblažsko. This association, usually called just Microregion Osoblažsko, is a voluntary association of municipalities, established to solve the drinking water supply problem of the region in 1990s and was restored in 2002 focusing mainly on solution of common problems reaching beyond the grasp of individual municipalities as well as the common regional development and cross-border cooperation.

== History ==
The area of Osoblažsko was settled first by the Slavic population but the Tartar invasion in 1241 halted the population ratios of Osoblažsko so severely that in the middle of the 13th century the Bishop Bruno of Schaumburg (Osoblažsko belonged to Olomouc bishops that is why it formed so-called "Moravian enclave" in Silesia until 1928) invited colonists with German origin from Saxony and Brandenburg in order to populate this region. Some villages were renewed and some founded new under his leadership. After the Thirty Years' War the Czech population decreased in the region and the population mainly consisted of German speaking people (including Jews). A deep scar to the region was inflicted by Austro-Prussian Wars resulting in dividing Silesia and setting the new border bounding of Osoblažsko in 1742. Economic ties gradually built for hundreds of years were cut off and from this point Osoblažsko region slowly recedes into the bad peripheral economic situation. Agriculture continues to dominate its economy although there is an industrial revolution developing in its surroundings. Peripheral situation in the time is confirmed by the railway from Třemešná to Osoblaha built in 1898 – more than 25 years later than the railway from Krnov to Jeseník and more importantly using a narrow-gauge and constructing it on a contour line to save costs.

Hegemony of the German population in Osoblažsko was partially disrupted by the arrival of the Czechs in 1918 when the newly formed Czechoslovak Republic sent out the Czech government employees to border regions with whom come the whole families. Czechs and Germans created a relatively peaceful atmosphere until the behaviour of Germans was radicalized in connection with Adolf Hitler power accession in Germany. Osoblažsko as a part of the Sudetenland was relegated to Germany in October 1938. More changes in ethnic composition were caused by the end of World War II when the German population was forced to leave the country. The region was then repopulated by inland Czechs, Volhynian Czechs from today's Ukraine, Slovaks and Greeks. Because of the Osoblaha municipalities were severely damaged during World War II and there were no industrial companies in the area, the repopulation was insufficient – as there were nearly 23,000 people living there before the World War II, currently the region has a population of under 10,000.

== Geography ==
Osoblažsko name is delivered from the Osoblaha River, which flows through the area and creates the Osoblaha River Valley. Osoblažsko covers almost 290 km^{2}. Consequences of the German population transfer are visible in the countryside even today. The Osoblažsko population density is 35 inhabitants per km^{2} which is well below the Czech average value as the national value is more than 3.5 times higher.

Insufficiently repopulated villages gradually disappear. Peripheral localisation of Osoblažsko and the insufficient area population is the cause of small size villages. Together with the halted industry development these factors have preserved high quality natural conditions. Osoblažsko belongs to the Zlatohorská Highlands (a part of the Eastern Sudetes) with its mountainous character with large forested areas, a small northern flat part lies in the Opava Hilly Land within the Silesian Lowlands and forms the so-called Osoblaha Plain.

== Economy ==
Osoblažsko is one of the poorest regions of the Czech Republic and suffered from the highest unemployment rate in the country (28.2% in January 2011). As of July 2020, the unemployment rate (6.6%) was still above Czech average.

== Tourism ==
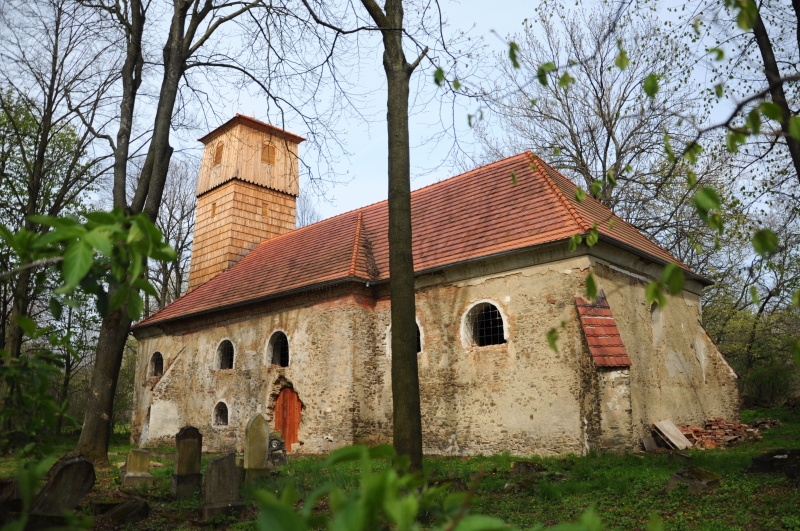
Church of St. George in Pelhřimovy

The main microregion attraction is the narrow-gauge railway from Třemešná to Osoblaha where in addition to regular public transport tourist rides with the steam locomotive are operated. Other sights and attractions include:

- Jewish cemetery in Osoblaha
- Observation towers Biskupská kupa (Petrovice) and Strážnice (Liptaň)
- Castles in Linhartovy, Jindřichov, Dívčí Hrad and Slezské Rudoltice
- Fulštejn Castle ruins
- Abandoned Pelhřimovy village with Church of St. George and baroque chapel
- Museum in Janov
- Swimming pools in Město Albrechtice and Osoblaha
- Eldorádo Hynčice – "the first Dinopark in the Czech Republic"

== See also ==
- Czech Silesia
- Moravia
- Moravian enclaves in Silesia
