= Lubrza =

Lubrza may refer to the following places in Poland:

== Rural administrative districts ==
- Gmina Lubrza, Lubusz Voivodeship
- Gmina Lubrza, Opole Voivodeship

== Villages ==
- Lubrza, Lubusz Voivodeship
- Lubrza, Opole Voivodeship
