= 391st Rifle Division =

Infantry division of the Red Army

- Active: 1941–1945
- Country: Soviet Union
- Branch: Red Army
- Type: Division
- Role: Infantry
- Engagements: Toropets–Kholm Offensive; Kholm Pocket; Demyansk Pocket; Leningrad-Novgorod Offensive; Baltic Offensive; Riga Offensive; Courland Pocket; Vistula-Oder Offensive; Upper Silesian Offensive; Prague Offensive
- Decorations: Order of the Red Banner
- Battle honours: Rezekne

Commanders
- Notable commanders: Col. Dmitrii Anatolevich Kovalenko; Col. Andrei Kuzmich Kudryashov; Maj. Gen. Maksim Evseevich Kozyr; Maj. Gen. Nikolai Pavlovich Anisimov; Col. Anton Demyanovich Timoshenko

The 391st Rifle Division was raised in 1941 as an infantry division of the Red Army, and fought the German Operation Barbarossa. It began forming in August 1941, in the Central Asian Military District. It was first assigned to Southwestern Front but on its arrival it was seen to be far from combat-ready and so was moved north to the Moscow area for further training. It was finally assigned to the 3rd Shock Army in Kalinin Front and took part in the battle for the Kholm Pocket. Following this the division was moved to 1st Shock Army and took part in the dismal fighting for the Demyansk salient until it was finally evacuated by the German forces in March, 1943. The division moved on into the gradual advance across the Baltic states through 1943 and 1944, winning a battle honor along the way, until February, 1945, when it was transferred with its 93rd Rifle Corps to 1st Ukrainian Front as part of 59th Army. In the last weeks of the war the 391st was awarded the Order of the Red Banner for its service in Upper Silesia, and ended the war advancing on Prague, but despite its distinguished record it was selected as one of the many divisions to be disbanded during the summer of 1945.

== Formation ==
The 391st began forming on August 19, 1941 at Alma-Ata in the Central Asia Military District, Its order of battle was as follows:

- 1024th Rifle Regiment
- 1278th Rifle Regiment
- 1280th Rifle Regiment
- 951st Artillery Regiment
- 404th Antitank Battalion
- 450th Reconnaissance Company
- 668th Sapper Battalion
- 839th Signal Battalion (184th Signal Company)
- 473rd Medical/Sanitation Battalion
- 466th Chemical Protection (Anti-gas) Company
- 503rd Motor Transport Company
- 255th Field Bakery
- 818th Divisional Veterinary Hospital
- 1420th Field Postal Station
- 759th Field Office of the State Bank

Col. Dmitrii Anatolevich Kovalenko was assigned to command of the division on August 28, and he would remain in command until March 8, 1942. In September the division's personnel were noted as being mostly Kazakh. These men had practically no time to train before they were ordered to the front. They arrived in the Volga Military District in mid-November and the division was briefly assigned to the 61st Army that was forming there, but instead of sending the raw unit into combat with that Army it was reassigned to the Moscow Defence Zone for more than a month of working-up.

== Battles of Kholm and Demyansk ==
As part of the Toropets–Kholm Offensive on January 23, 1942 the 33rd Rifle Division of 3rd Shock Army tenuously encircled the German forces defending the town of Kholm. Throughout January 24-26 the German Battlegroup Scherer barely held against constant Soviet attacks, but the two sides were at roughly the same strength so no decisive results could be obtained. On January 31 the 391st was released from the Reserve of the Supreme High Command and began moving towards the pocket, which it reached in the second week of February along with the 146th Tank Battalion (two T-34s and 11 T-60s), the 44th Artillery Regiment (76mm guns) and three BM-8 multiple rocket launchers. There were now about 23,000 Soviet troops besieging about 4,500 German troops.

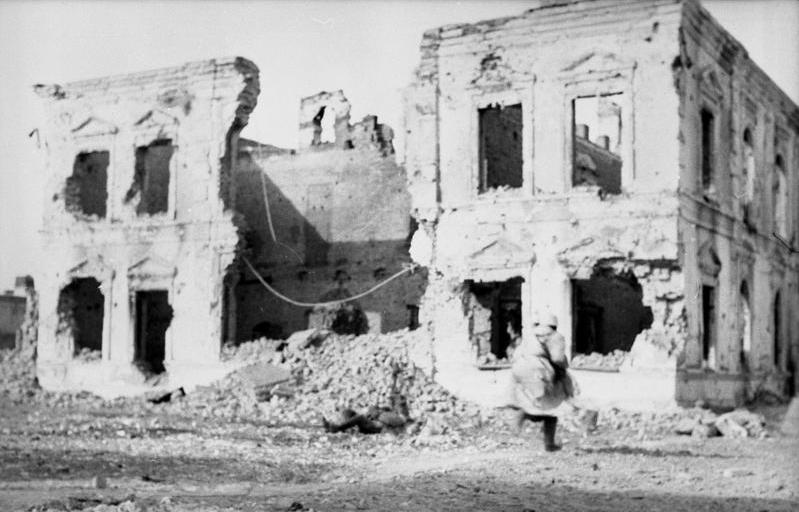
The GPU building in Kholm near the end of the siege

On February 13 Soviet artillery and aerial bombing struck the town heavily. The 1278th Rifle Regiment with tank support attacked the southwest sector held by Jagdcommando 8 without success, but the 82nd Regiment of the 33rd Division, backed by Lend-Lease Matilda II tanks, penetrated the main defensive line of the 386th Infantry Regiment, making a large dent in the Kholm perimeter and bringing Scherer's headquarters under direct fire. Attacks continued near the break-in point for five more days but the German regiment was finally able to seal off the breach. The additional artillery now allowed the Soviet forces to neutralize the airfield, forcing the German airlift to rely entirely on gliders and air drops. On the morning of February 21 the commander of 3rd Shock, Lt. Gen. M. A. Purkayev, began a new push with forces of the newly arrived 2nd Guards Rifle Corps, which attacked towards Dubrova, where a German artillery grouping had been firing in support of the pocket. Three days later the replenished 33rd and 391st Divisions attacked the southeast side of Kholm while the fresh 37th Rifle Brigade struck in the north, finally bringing the encirclement under simultaneous concentric attacks. Although Soviet tanks and infantry reached the GPU building, they could not capture it.

By early March the German XXXIX Army Corps had managed to assemble something less than two divisions for a relief attack which failed due to worsening weather and stiff Soviet resistance. On March 9 Col. Andrei Kuzmich Kudryashov took command of the division from Colonel Kovalenko. The spring thaw arrived in early April, melting the German defenses built of ice and snow and exposing their forces to mortar and sniper fire, while 3rd Shock launched repeated unsuccessful attacks between April 2 and 18. In the end German assault guns broke the siege on May 5. Prior to this, in late April the 391st was transferred to the nearby 1st Shock Army of Northwestern Front. This Army faced the south side of the newly-formed "Ramushevo corridor" that had restored tenuous land communications with the previously encircled German II Army Corps at Demyansk.

=== Demyansk Pocket ===
On May 3 the Front made its first attempt to cut the 4km-wide corridor; 1st Shock attacked from the south while 11th Army struck from the north. The attempt was a failure although artillery fire prevented the German supply columns from using the road most of the time. On May 16, Col. Aleksei Stepanovich Frolov replaced Colonel Kudryashov in command; he was in turn replaced by Col. Pyotr Mitrofanovich Paramonov on July 2. The second attempt to sever the corridor began at 1400 hours on July 17. The 391st, now in the 1st Guards Rifle Corps, formed one of the assault groups of 1st Shock Army, along with the 14th and 37th Rifle Brigades. Following a 90-minute artillery bombardment which barely scratched the German positions the attack went in and walked straight into carefully prepared engagement areas which quickly tore the shock groups to shreds. The Soviet artillery had insufficient stocks of shells and the attack degenerated into a battle of attrition and collapsed a week later having gained about a thousand metres of ground.

A new offensive began on August 10 with the 391st again forming an assault group for 1st Shock, along with the 130th and 364th Rifle Divisions and the 37th Brigade, backed by 30 tanks. There was only enough artillery ammunition for a 10-minute bombardment which failed to dent the German defenses. Again these groups were badly shot up. On the next day Colonel Paramonov left his command of the division, being replaced on the 14th by Lt. Col. Vasilii Fedorovich Marchuk. In the course of the fighting the commander of 1st Guards Corps, Maj. Gen. N. D. Zakhvataev, was wounded. By August 21 the offensive had to be halted due to heavy casualties and insufficient supply of shells. While the corridor was again disrupted by Soviet artillery, no more than a few hundred metres of ground had been gained. The 391st was spared further action in another offensive in September. Following this, on September 27 the German 16th Army launched Operation Michael in an attempt to drive back or even destroy the 1st Guards Corps in a salient it held south of the corridor. Supported by artillery and airstrikes the Germans surrounded and overwhelmed one regiment of the 7th Guards Rifle Division within hours. After a six-day fight the east side of the salient was smashed in, and after a regrouping the west side was struck on October 7. With 1st Shock on the verge of a crushing defeat, the salient was evacuated. In the midst of this, on October 10 Maj. Gen. Maksim Evseevich Kozyr took command of the division.

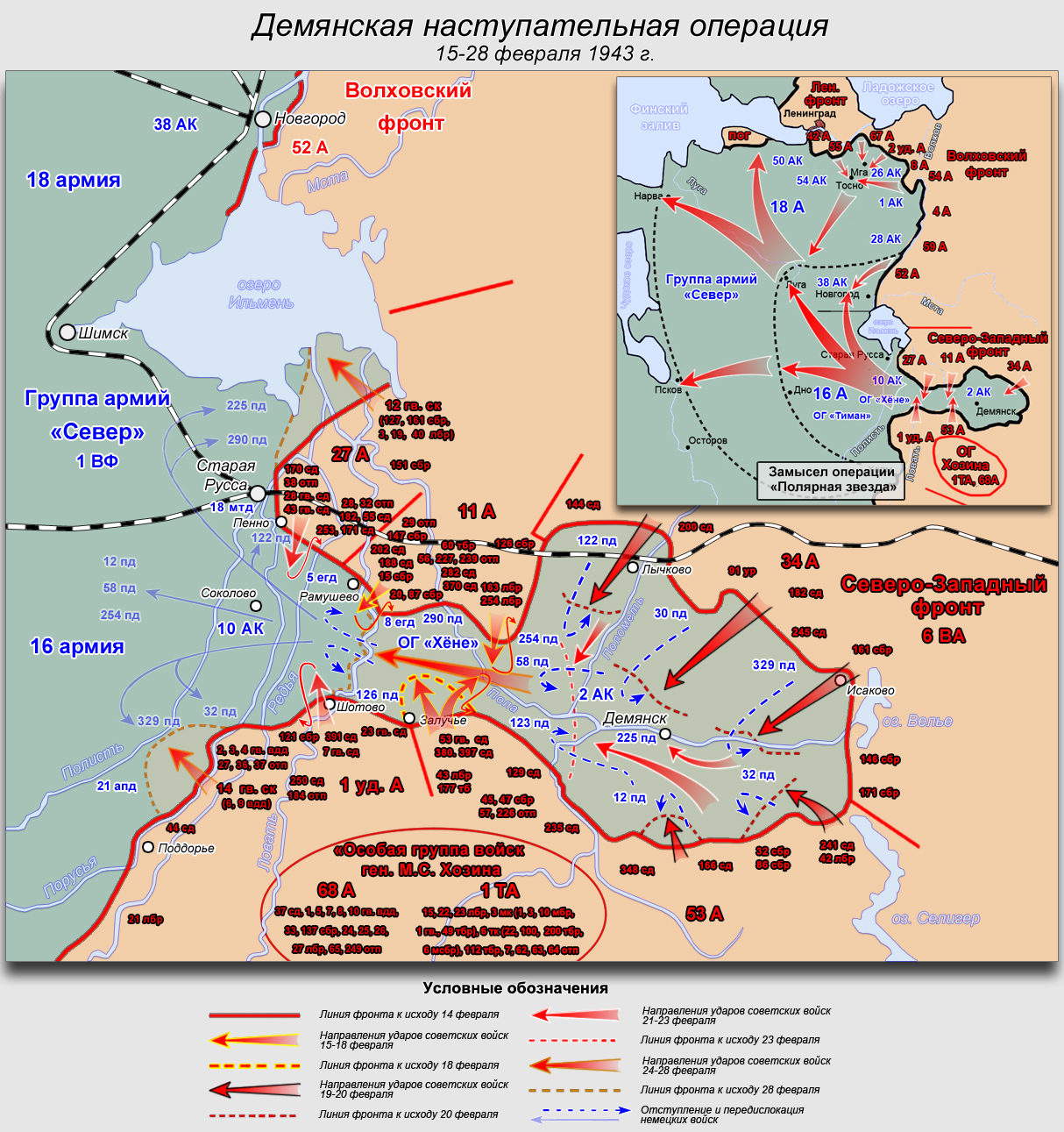
Soviet positions at Demyansk, spring 1943. The 391st was in the 1st Shock Army sector south of the Ramushevo corridor

By November 1 the 391st was a separate division in 1st Shock Army. The Soviet forces around Demyansk were intended to play a role in the second Soviet winter offensive, which also included Operation Uranus and Operation Mars, if only to tie down German forces that could be more usefully employed elsewhere. Yet another attack on the corridor began on the night of November 23/24, this time focused on its eastern end, but the division played no major role in it. The Demyansk pocket had always been partially supplied by air, and following the encirclement of the German 6th Army at Stalingrad those air assets were much more required to the south. Too late to make a difference, on January 31, 1943, Hitler authorized the evacuation of the salient.

In the aftermath of Operation Iskra, which had restored land communications with Leningrad, Marshal Georgy Zhukov planned a further operation, Operation Polyarnaya Zvezda, intended to completely end the siege of that city and destroy Army Group North. Northwestern Front's role in the offensive would once again be the elimination of the Demyansk pocket. At the same time the German command was planning its Operation Ziethen, the phased withdrawal from the salient. 1st Shock Army's part in the offensive was to begin on February 19. It was regrouped westward to attack the south side of the mouth of the corridor and was reinforced with four tank regiments, two artillery divisions, two Guards Mortar divisions, and two aviation corps. The 391st and 7th Guards formed a secondary shock group to launch an attack on a 5km sector from Shotovo to Viazki, with the objective of taking the village of Ramushevo. In the event, nothing went as planned. In mid-month intense cold was replaced by continuous rain with reinforcements and supplies becoming bogged down. Ziethen began on February 17 and immediately began freeing up German troops to form reserves. 1st Shock's attack had to be postponed until February 26 by which time it was facing three German divisions instead of one. The assault troops managed to gain from 1 - 3km with great difficulty, and a further effort the next day was stopped in its tracks. In the midst of the carnage medical sledge-dog teams were used to evacuate wounded from the battlefield. The division's Medical Assistant Tartkov moved 98 men to aid posts, for which he was awarded the Order of Lenin.

General Kozyr was moved to command of the 7th Guards on March 11, being replaced by Maj. Gen. Nikolai Pavlovich Anisimov. Kozyr would go on to become a Hero of the Soviet Union as commander of the 232nd Rifle Division before being killed in action while serving as deputy commander of 50th Rifle Corps in April 1945. The 391st and the 3rd Guards Airborne Divisions were by now so decimated in the fighting that they were replaced in the front line by the 6th and 9th Guards Airborne Divisions. The division remained for most of the year in 1st Shock Army, by October under the 90th Rifle Corps. On October 16 General Anisimov was reassigned to the training establishment, being replaced by Col. Anton Demyanovich Timoshenko, who would remain in command for the duration. In November, when Northwestern Front was disbanded, the division was briefly moved to the Reserve of the Supreme High Command before being assigned to 2nd Baltic Front.

== Into the Baltic States ==
As of December 1 the 391st was in the Front reserves, but by the start of 1944 it had been assigned to the 97th Rifle Corps of 6th Guards Army. Later in January it had been reassigned yet again, now serving as a separate division in 22nd Army of the same Front. The Leningrad–Novgorod Offensive began on January 14 but in its early stages primarily involved the attacks by Leningrad and Volkhov Fronts against the German 18th Army. By mid-February the 16th Army found itself in a deep salient leaving it vulnerable to a joint offensive by 2nd Baltic and Leningrad Fronts. Planning for the Staraya Russa-Novorzhev Offensive began on February 17; however, Army Group North was by now acutely aware of the danger and began its own action on the same day, beginning with a withdrawal from Staraya Russa. On the 19th the 22nd Army began its pursuit of the German II Corps. During this advance Kholm was finally liberated on February 21. On the night of February 24/25 joint forces of the 22nd and 1st Shock Armies captured Dedovichi. The exploitation continued the next day as the 391st attacked the 15th Latvian SS Division, forcing it to withdraw and destroying the small German garrison at Chikhachyovo. In the last days of the month the division moved back to the 1st Shock Army, but in the face of increasing German resistance that Army went over to the defense in early March after an advance of nearly 180km.

=== Baltic Offensive ===
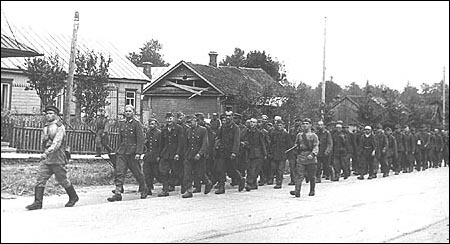
German POWs march through Rezekne, 1944

In June the 391st was moved back to the 3rd Shock Army as a separate division. At the start of the summer campaign it was facing the defenses of the Panther Line, southeast of Idritsa. Pushing past these and into the Baltic states the division was finally awarded a battle honor for its part in the liberation of Rezekne, Latvia:

"REZEKNE... 391st Rifle Division (Colonel Timoshenko, Anton Demyanovich)... The troops who participated in the liberation of Daugavpils and Rezekne, by the order of the Supreme High Command of July 27, 1944, and a commendation in Moscow, are given a salute of 20 artillery salvoes from 224 guns.

Shortly afterwards the division was subordinated to the 93rd Rifle Corps, where it would remain for the duration. By September 1 the 93rd Corps had been transferred to the 42nd Army, and was approaching Krustpils by mid-month. As of October 1, 93rd Corps had been shifted yet again, now to the 22nd Army, and was fighting west of Jaunjelgava as part of the push to seal off Army Group North in the Courland Pocket.

== Silesian Campaign ==
93rd Rifle Corps remained in 22nd Army in Latvia for the rest of 1944, and into February, 1945. Since this was a mostly quiet front Stavka decided that the Corps was more needed elsewhere, and so from February 7 - 19 it was moved by rail to join the 59th Army in 1st Ukrainian Front. As of March 1 the Corps consisted of the 391st, 98th and 239th Rifle Divisions.

On February 24, immediately following the Lower Silesian Offensive, the Front commander, Marshal I. S. Konev, presented his plan for subsequent operations. Upon the arrival of the Front's main group of forces in the Neisse area the 59th and 60th Armies were to develop the attack from the bridgehead north of Ratibor to the west and southwest. Ultimately this operation would encircle and destroy the German group of forces in the Oppeln salient. 59th Army would launch its main attack along the left flank with the 93rd and 115th Rifle Corps and the 7th Guards Mechanized Corps in the general direction of Kostenthal and Zultz. 93rd Corps would have just the 98th Division in the first echelon. The 391st would be committed on the second day with the objective of reaching a line from Ober Glogau to Deutsch Rasselwitz to Stundorf.

The offensive on the 59th and 60th Army's sector began at 0850 hours on March 15 following an 80-minute artillery preparation and went largely according to plan although more slowly than expected. The main German defense zone was broken through on a 12km front and advanced 6 - 8km during the day. Bad weather prevented air support before noon, and the advancing forces also had to repel ten counterattacks. In response Marshal Konev ordered that the advance continue through the night. During the day on March 16 the 59th Army managed to advance another 3 - 9km, and the 93rd Rifle and 7th Guards Mechanized Corps cleared the entire depth of the German defenses and set the stage for the success of the attack over the next two days. By the end of March 17 the two corps had reached the line Tomas - Schenau - Kittledorf while the 115th Corps covered against flank attacks from the north. By noon on the next day the 93rd and 7th Guards forced the Hotzenplotz River and began to pursue the remnants of the defeated German forces. During the day the 59th Army linked up with the 21st Army, encircling the 20th SS, 168th and 344th Infantry Divisions, part of the 18th SS Panzergrenadier Division, and several independent regiments and battalions in the area southwest of Oppeln.

With the encirclement completed the 93rd Corps was tasked with preventing the encircled grouping from breaking out to the southwest. The 391st and the 26th Guards Mechanized Brigade of 7th Guards Corps were ordered to securely hold the line Neustadt - Kunzendorf - Kröschendorf in order to prevent a breakthrough by German forces into the encirclement from the south. On March 19 up to a battalion of encircled infantry, supported by tanks and assault guns, attacked the left flank of the division in the Hozenplotz area but this, along with a larger attack against other elements of the Corps, was quickly recognized as a feint to disguise the actual direction of the planned breakout, which was in the 21st Army's sector. All these efforts were beaten back, as was a break-in attempt by the Hermann Göring Panzer Division towards Steinau. At the same time the remaining encircling forces attacked into the pocket to break up and liquidate the defenders. By March 20 this task was largely completed, with total German casualties of 30,000 killed, 15,000 prisoners, 21 aircraft, 57 tanks and assault guns and 464 guns of various calibers. On March 21 the 59th Army resumed its advance in the direction of Jägerndorf which it reached but did not take on March 31. Due to the toll of casualties during the offensive and inadequate supplies of ammunition, the Army was ordered to go over to the defense.

== Postwar ==
On April 26 the division was awarded the Order of the Red Banner for its part in the capture of Oppeln in Upper Silesia. Beginning on May 6 it advanced with its Corps and Army in the Prague offensive, and took part in the final encirclement of Army Group Center. According to Stavka Order No. 11096 of May 29, 1945, part 8, the 391st is listed as one of the rifle divisions to be "disbanded in place". It was disbanded in accordance with the directive in July 1945.
