= Hlinka (Bruntál District) =

- Municipality
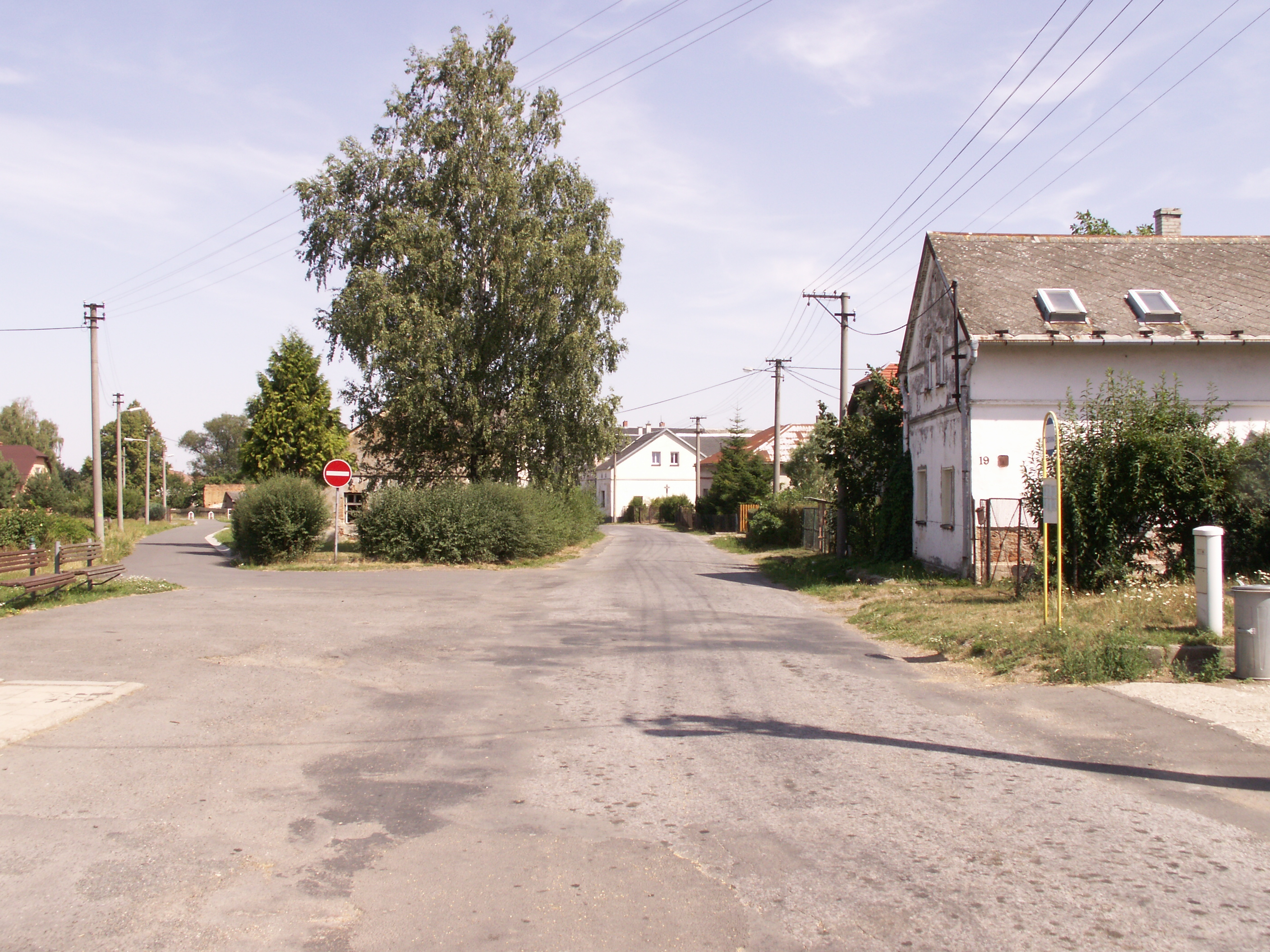
- Centre of Hlinka

- Flag Coat of arms

- Location in the Czech Republic
- Coordinates: 50°16′48″N 17°40′20″E
- Country: Czech Republic
- Region: Moravian-Silesian
- District: Bruntál
- First mentioned: 1267

Area
  - Total: 8.74 km^{2} (3.37 sq mi)
- Elevation: 254 m (833 ft)

Population (2026-01-01)
  - Total: 216
  - Density: 24.7/km^{2} (64.0/sq mi)
- Time zone: UTC+1 (CET)
  - Summer (DST): UTC+2 (CEST)
- Postal code: 793 99
- Website: www.obechlinka.cz

Hlinka (German: Glemkau) is a municipality and village in Bruntál District in the Moravian-Silesian Region of the Czech Republic. It has about 200 inhabitants.

== Etymology ==
The name, which is a diminutive form of hlína (i.e. 'clay'), is derived from the clay quarrying that took place here. The settlement was first called Glynik. The name Hlinka first appeared in 1389.

== Geography ==
Hlinka is located about 35 kilometres (22 mi) northeast of Bruntál and 64 km (40 mi) northwest of Ostrava. It is located in the Osoblažsko microregion on the border of with Poland. The southwestern part of the municipal territory lies in the Zlatohorská Highlands and the northeastern part extends into the Opava Hilly Land. The highest point is at 341 m (1,119 ft) above sea level.

In the northern part is located the Velký Pavlovický rybník Nature Reserve with the fishpond Pavlovický rybník I, which has extraordinary importance as a stop of migratory birds and nesting places of water birds. It has an area of 30.8 ha (76 acres). Amphibian populations are also subject to protection, especially European fire-bellied toad.

== History ==
The first written mention of Hlinka is from 1267. It was an agricultural village that was part of the Osoblaha estate owned by the bishops of Olomouc. In the 16th century, it was acquired by the Lords of Vrbno, who sold it to the Sedlnický of Choltice family at the end of the 16th century. After the properties of the family were confiscated in 1622 for their participation in the Bohemian Revolt, it was joined to the Dívčí Hrad estate and shared its owners and destinies.

== Demographics ==
Historical population

Year	Pop.	±%
1869	574	—
1880	601	+4.7%
1890	557	−7.3%
1900	502	−9.9%
1910	448	−10.8%

Year	Pop.	±%
1921	463	+3.3%
1930	435	−6.0%
1950	240	−44.8%
1961	345	+43.8%
1970	305	−11.6%

Year	Pop.	±%
1980	266	−12.8%
1991	243	−8.6%
2001	236	−2.9%
2011	197	−16.5%
2021	181	−8.1%

Source: Censuses

== Transport ==
There are no railways or major roads passing through the municipality. On the Czech–Polish broder is the Rylovka / Krzyżkowice road border crossing.

== Sights ==
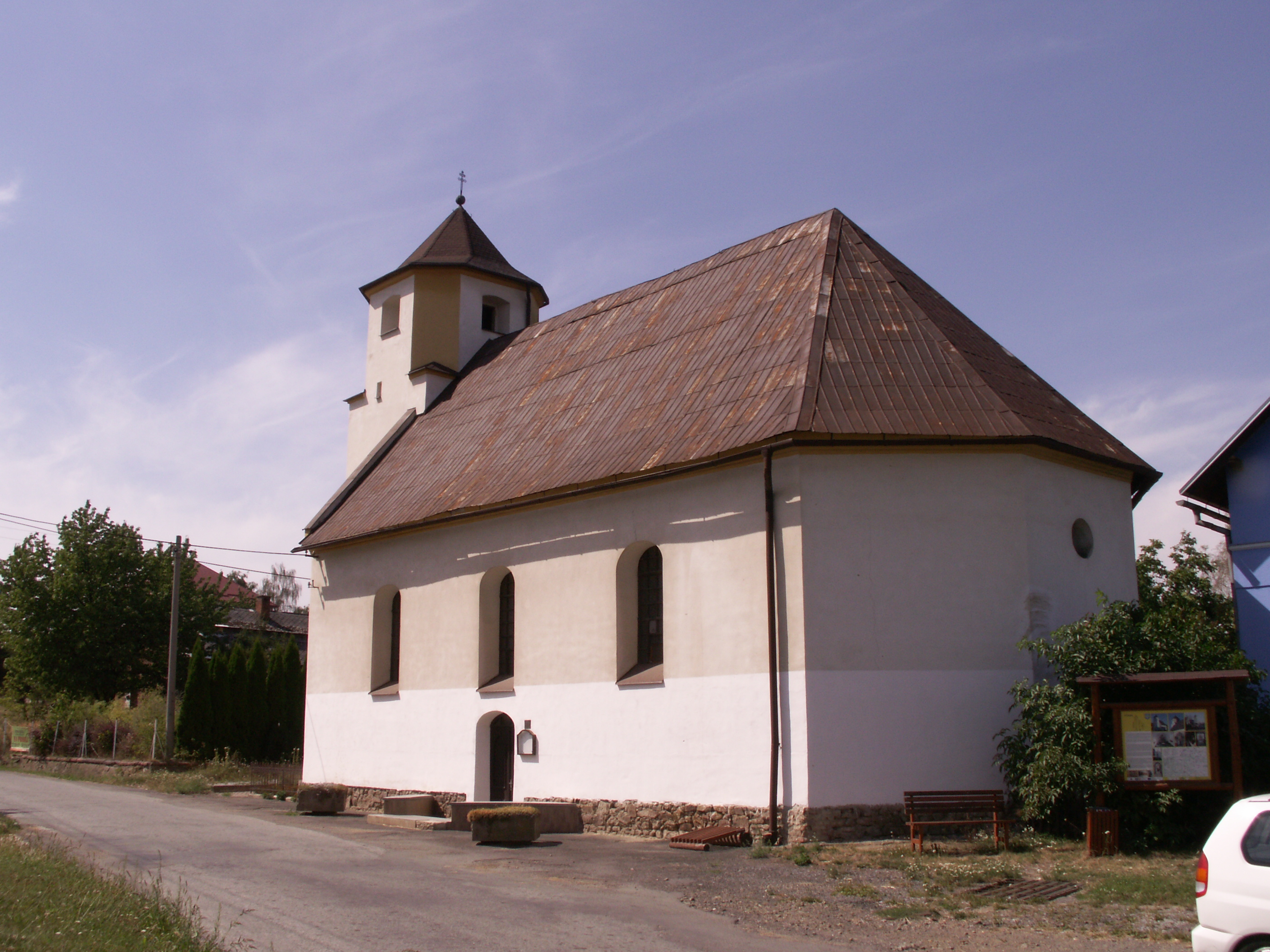
Church of Saint Valentine

The only cultural monuments in the municipality is the Church of Saint Valentine. It is a small rural church built in 1813. The bell in the church dates from 1780.
