= Skrzypiec, Opole Voivodeship =

Skrzypiec
- Village
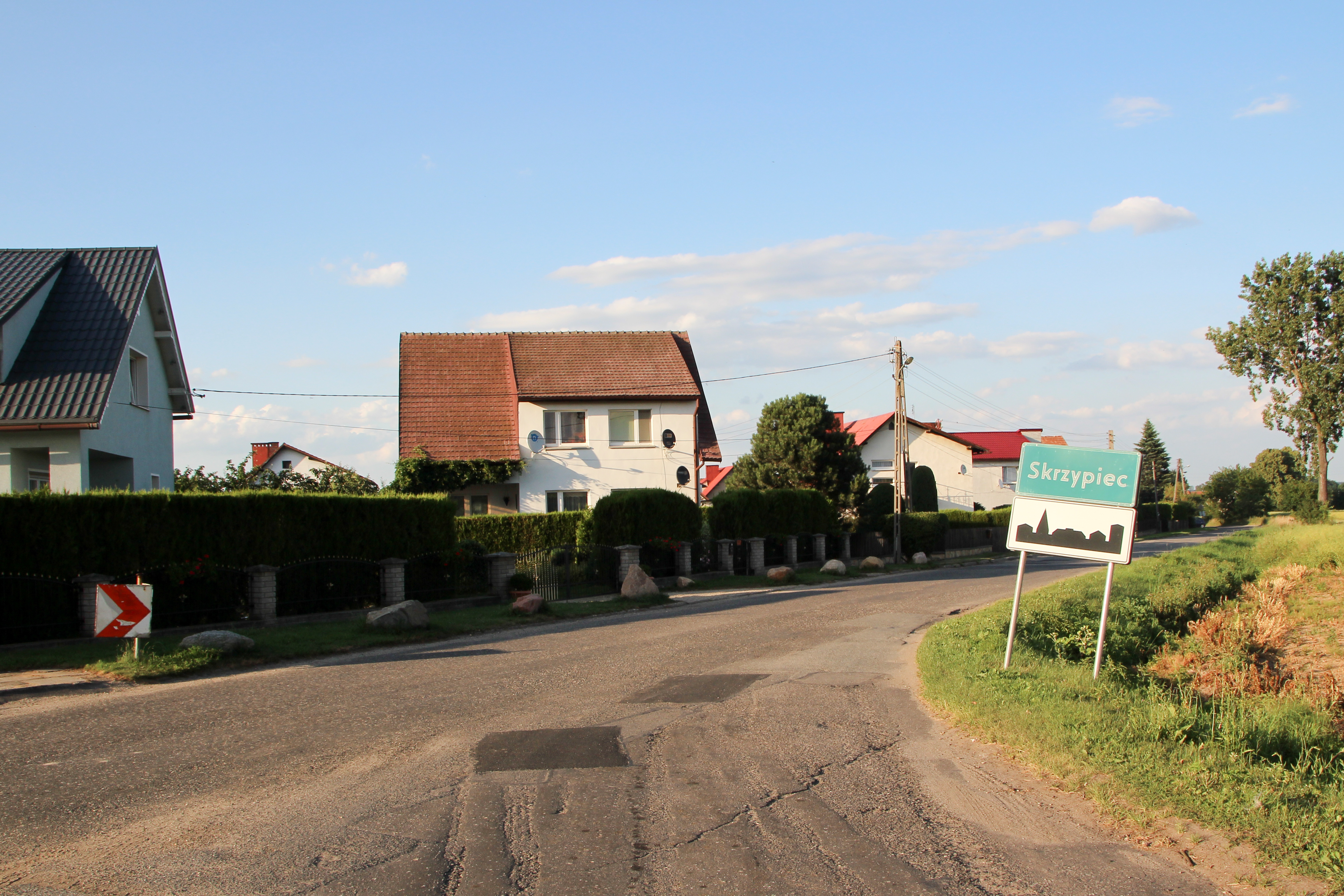

- Location within Poland
- Coordinates: 50°18′52″N 17°38′57″E
- Country: Poland
- Voivodeship: Opole
- County: Prudnik
- Gmina: Lubrza

Skrzypiec [ˈskʂɨpjɛt͡s] (German: Kreiwitz) is a village in the administrative district of Gmina Lubrza, within Prudnik County, Opole Voivodeship, in south-western Poland, close to the Czech border.
