= Dytmarów-Stacja =

- Village
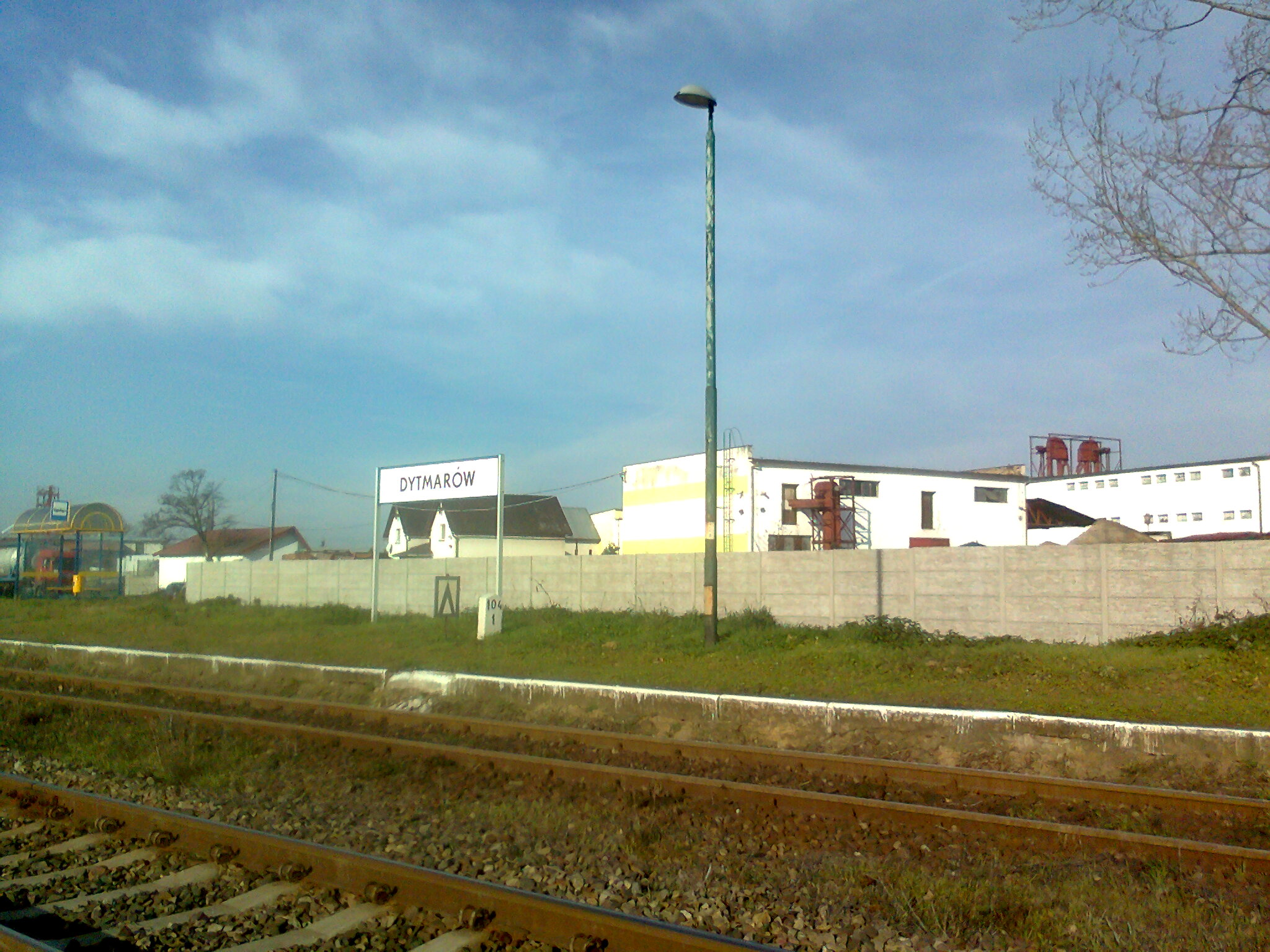

- Location within Poland
- Coordinates: 50°19′49″N 17°40′36″E
- Country: Poland
- Voivodeship: Opole
- County: Prudnik
- Gmina: Prudnik
- Time zone: UTC+1 (CET)
  - Summer (DST): UTC+2
- Postal code: 48-231
- Area code: +4877
- Vehicle registration: OPR

Dytmarów-Stacja is a village in the administrative district of Gmina Lubrza, within Prudnik County, Opole Voivodeship, south-western Poland. It is situated in the historical region of Prudnik Land.
