= Dobroszowice =

- Village
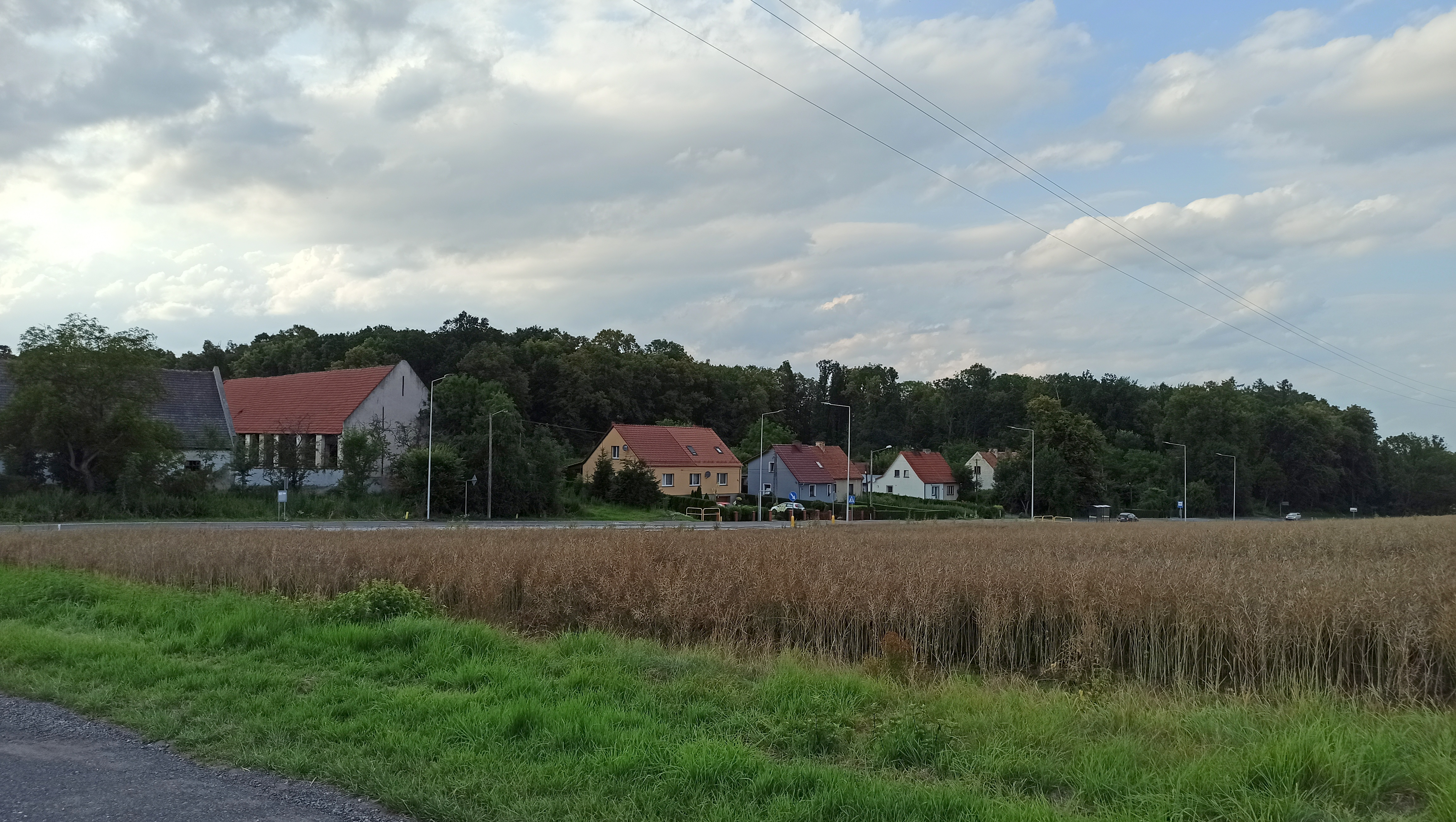
- Houses in Dobroszewice

- Location within Poland
- Coordinates: 50°21′32″N 17°38′29″E
- Country: Poland
- Voivodeship: Opole
- County: Prudnik
- Gmina: Lubrza

Dobroszowice [dɔbrɔʂɔˈvit͡sɛ] (German: Eloisenhof) is a village in the administrative district of Gmina Lubrza, within Prudnik County, Opole Voivodeship, in south-western Poland, close to the Czech border.

== See also ==
- Prudnik Land
