= Olszynka, Opole Voivodeship =

Olszynka
- Village
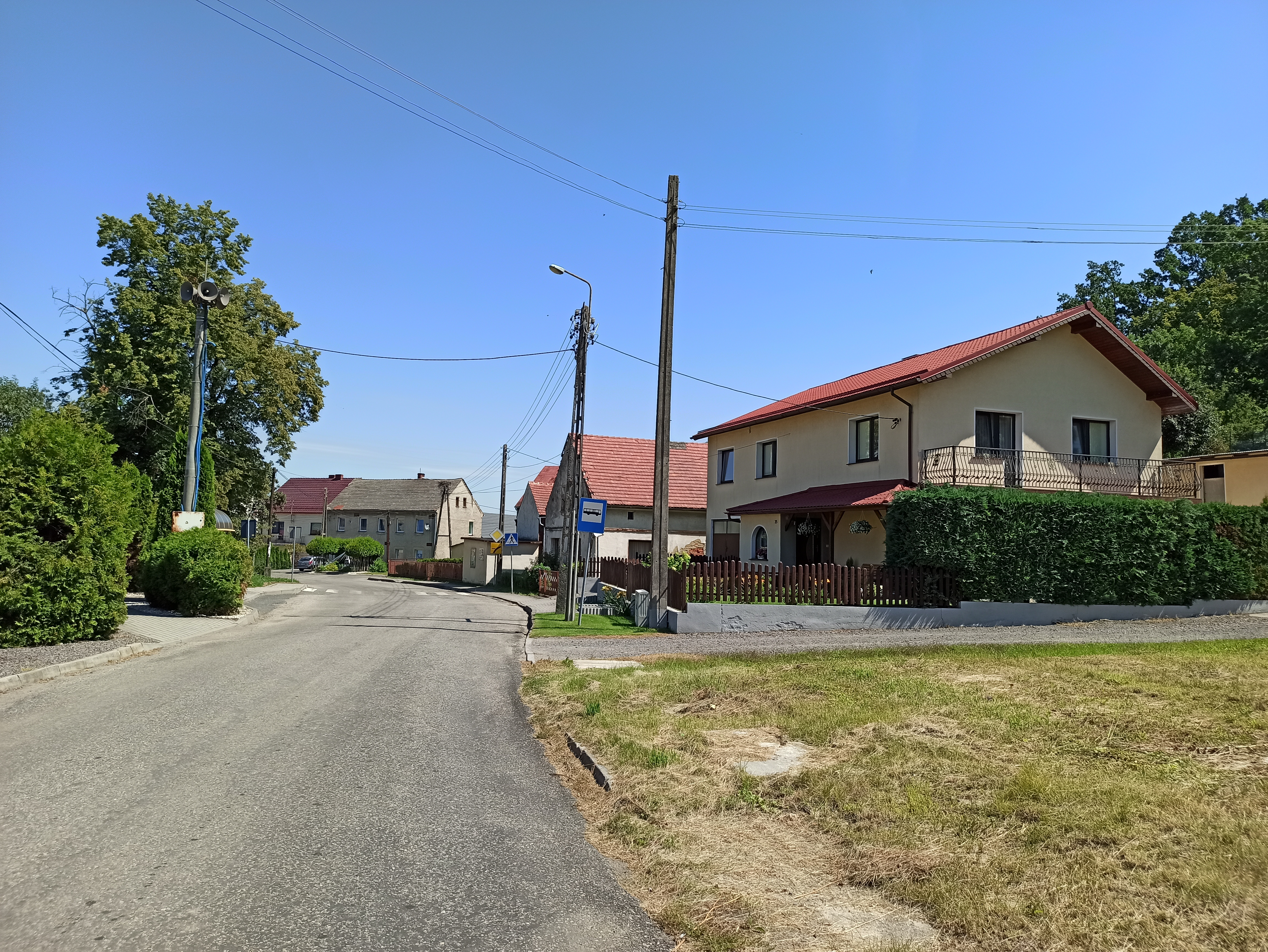

- Location within Poland
- Coordinates: 50°20′28″N 17°41′23″E
- Country: Poland
- Voivodeship: Opole
- County: Prudnik
- Gmina: Lubrza

Olszynka [ɔlˈʂɨnka] (German: Ellsnig) is a village in the administrative district of Gmina Lubrza, within Prudnik County, Opole Voivodeship, in south-western Poland, close to the Czech border.

== See also ==
- Prudnik Land
