= Opawskie Mountains Landscape Park =

Protected area in southwestern Poland

- Park Krajobrazowy Góry Opawskie
- IUCN category V (protected landscape/seascape)
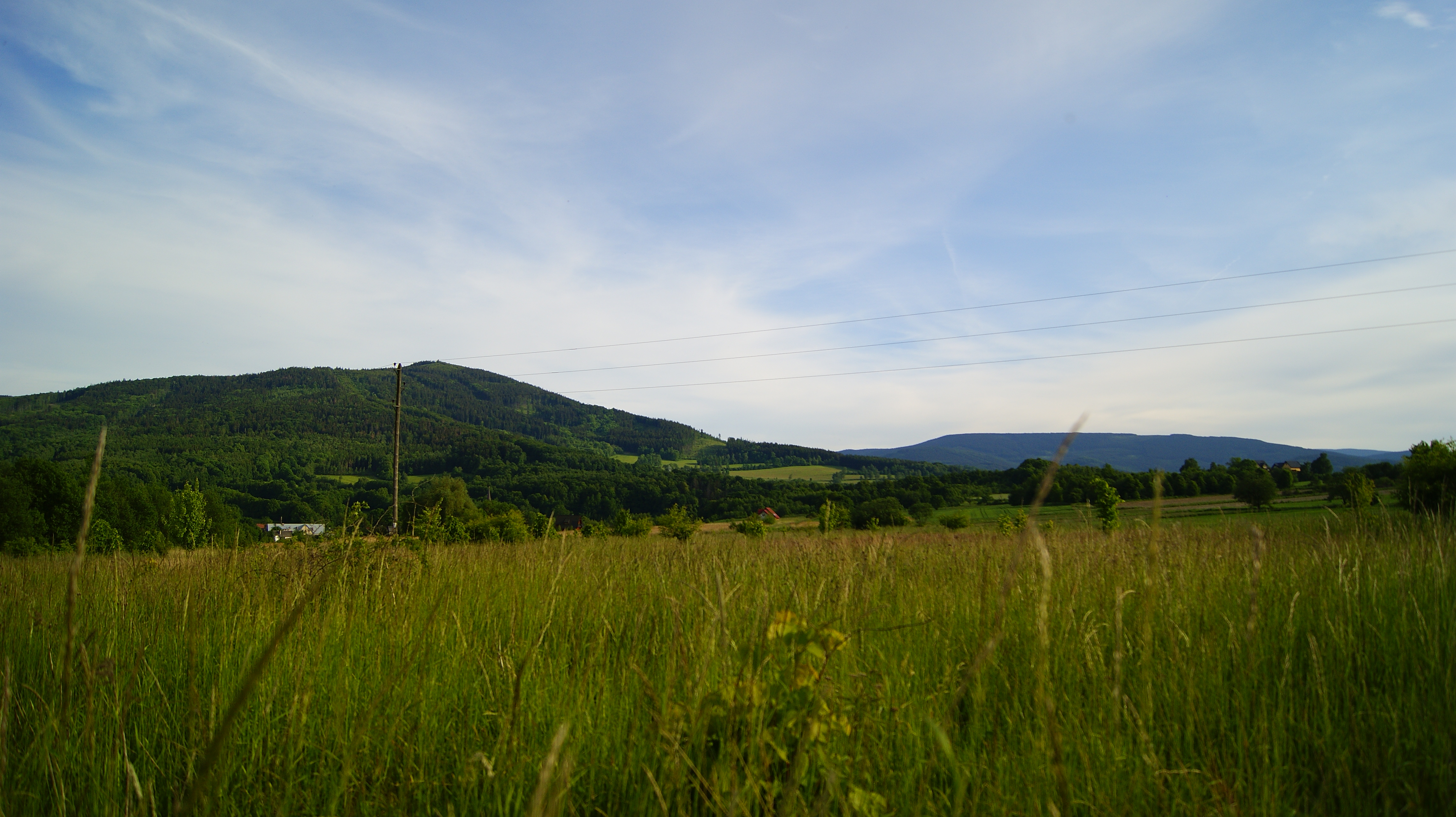

- Location within Poland
- Location: Opole Voivodeship
- Nearest city: Prudnik; Głuchołazy
- Coordinates: 50.2836°N 17.4533°E
- Area: 49.03 km^{2} (18.93 sq mi)
- Established: 1988
- Website: http://zopk.pl/pl/pk-gory-opawskie/aktualnosci

Opawskie Mountains Landscape Park (Park Krajobrazowy Gór Opawskich) is a protected area (Landscape Park) in the Opawskie Mountains in south-western Poland, established in 1988, covering an area of 49.03 square kilometres (18.93 sq mi).

The Park lies within Opole Voivodeship: in Nysa County (Gmina Głuchołazy) and Prudnik County (Gmina Prudnik, Gmina Lubrza), between the cities of Prudnik and Głuchołazy.

Within the Landscape Park are four nature reserves.

== Flora of the Park ==
There are over 500 species of vascular plants in the area of the Opawskie Mountains Landscape Park, most of them are native species.

- Allium ursinum
- Atropa belladonna
- Aruncus dioicus
- Asplenium septentrionale
- Carlina acaulis
- Cephalanthera longifolia
- Corydalis intermedia
- Daphne mezereum
- Digitalis grandiflora
- Digitalis purpurea
- Epipactis albensis
- Lilium martagon
- Lysimachia nemorum
- Orchis mascula
- Orobanche flava
- Ranunculus platanifolius
- Struthiopteris spicant

== Fauna of the Park ==
There are 163 species of protected animals in the Opawskie Mountains Landscape Park, 154 of which are under strict protection.

=== Amphibians ===
- Alpine newt
- Common frog
- Edible frog
- European fire-bellied toad
- Fire salamander
- Marsh frog
- Pelobates fuscus
- Yellow-bellied toad

=== Reptiles ===
- Anguis fragilis
- Grass snake
- Sand lizard
- Smooth snake
- Vipera berus

=== Birds ===
- Black stork
- Black woodpecker
- Common kingfisher
- Corn crake
- Eurasian eagle-owl
- Eurasian hoopoe
- European green woodpecker
- Great spotted woodpecker
- Grey-headed woodpecker
- Grey wagtail
- Middle spotted woodpecker
- White stork
- White-throated dipper

=== Mammals ===
- Brown long-eared bat
- Capreolus
- Cervus
- Daubenton's bat
- European mole
- Greater mouse-eared bat
- Hare
- Lesser horseshoe bat
- Natterer's bat
- Northern bat
- Sciurus
- Western barbastelle
- Wild boar
