= Jasiona, Prudnik County =

Jasiona
- Village
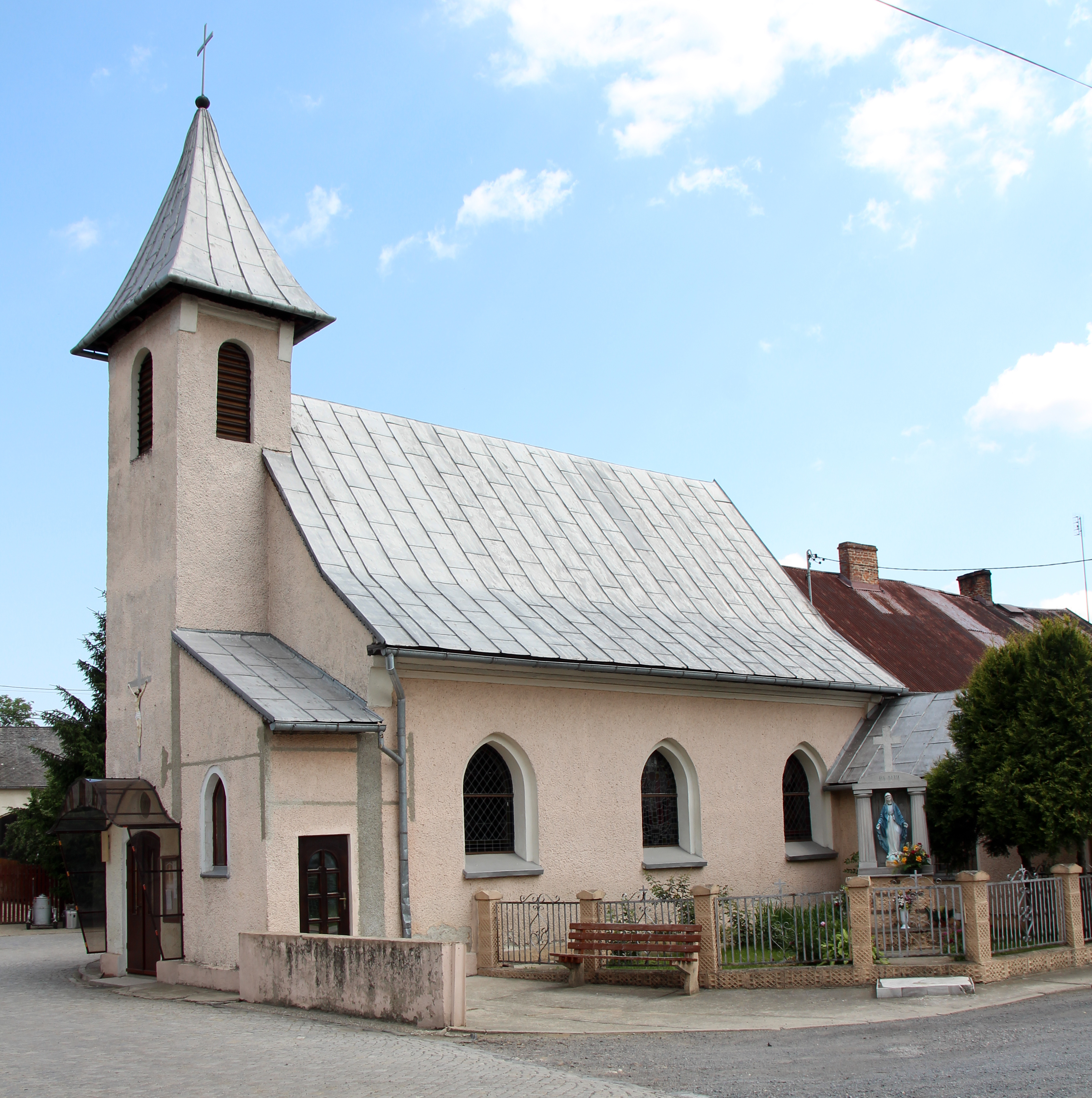
- Saint Mary church in Jasiona

- Location within Poland
- Coordinates: 50°18′49″N 17°36′57″E
- Country: Poland
- Voivodeship: Opole
- County: Prudnik
- Gmina: Lubrza
- First mentioned: 1233
- Time zone: UTC+1 (CET)
  - Summer (DST): UTC+2 (CEST)
- Vehicle registration: OPR

Jasiona [jaˈɕɔna] (German: Jassen) is a village in the administrative district of Gmina Lubrza, within Prudnik County, Opole Voivodeship, in southern Poland, close to the Czech border.

== History ==
The village was first mentioned in 1233, when it was part of fragmented Piast-ruled Poland. Later on, it was also part of Bohemia (Czechia), Prussia, and Germany. During World War II, the Germans operated the E591 forced labour subcamp of the Stalag VIII-B/344 prisoner-of-war camp in the village. After Germany's defeat in the war, in 1945, the village became again part of Poland.

== See also ==
- Prudnik Land
