= Słoków =

- Village
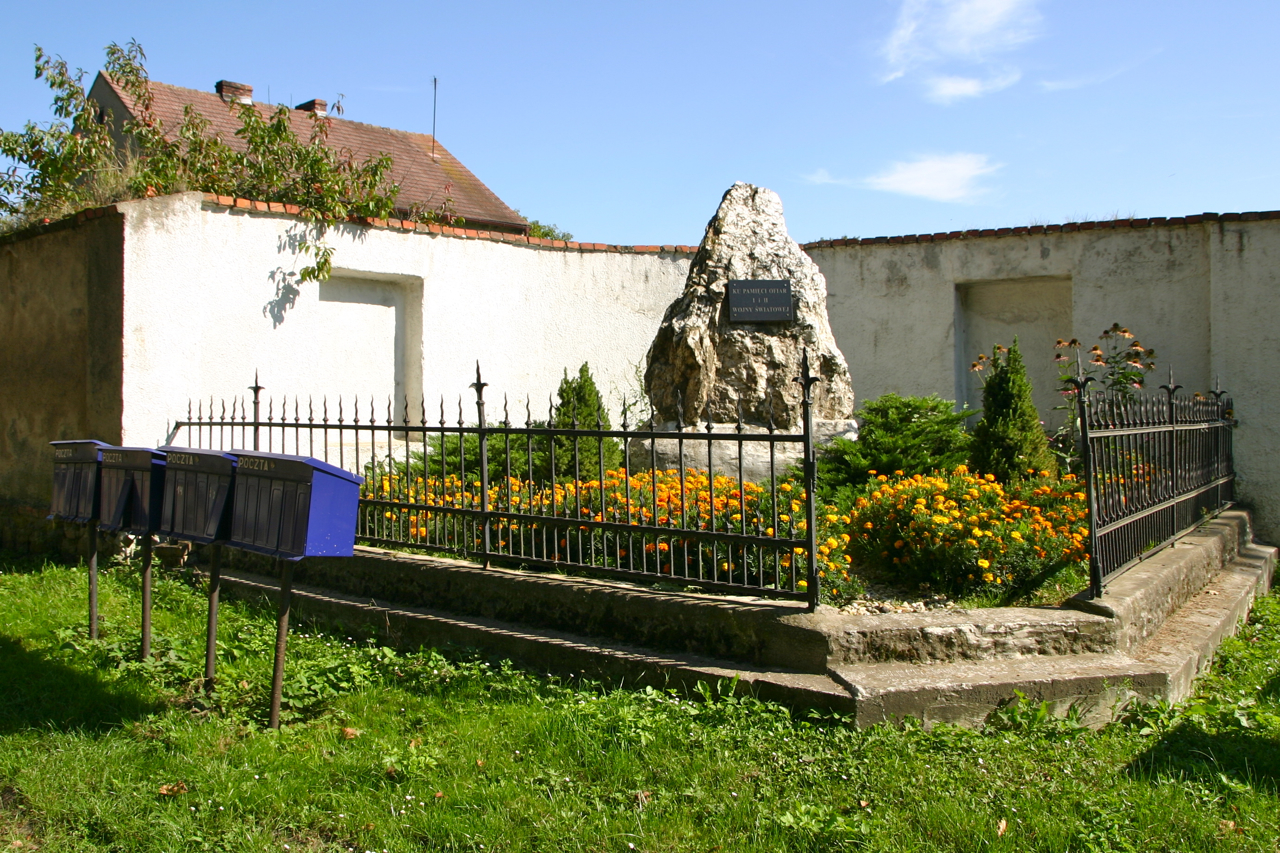

- Location within Poland
- Coordinates: 50°21′N 17°41′E
- Country: Poland
- Voivodeship: Opole
- County: Prudnik
- Gmina: Lubrza

Słoków [ˈswɔkuf] (German: Schlogwitz) is a village in the administrative district of Gmina Lubrza, within Prudnik County, Opole Voivodeship, in south-western Poland, close to the Czech border.

== See also ==
- Prudnik Land
