= Laskowice, Prudnik County =

Laskowice
- Village
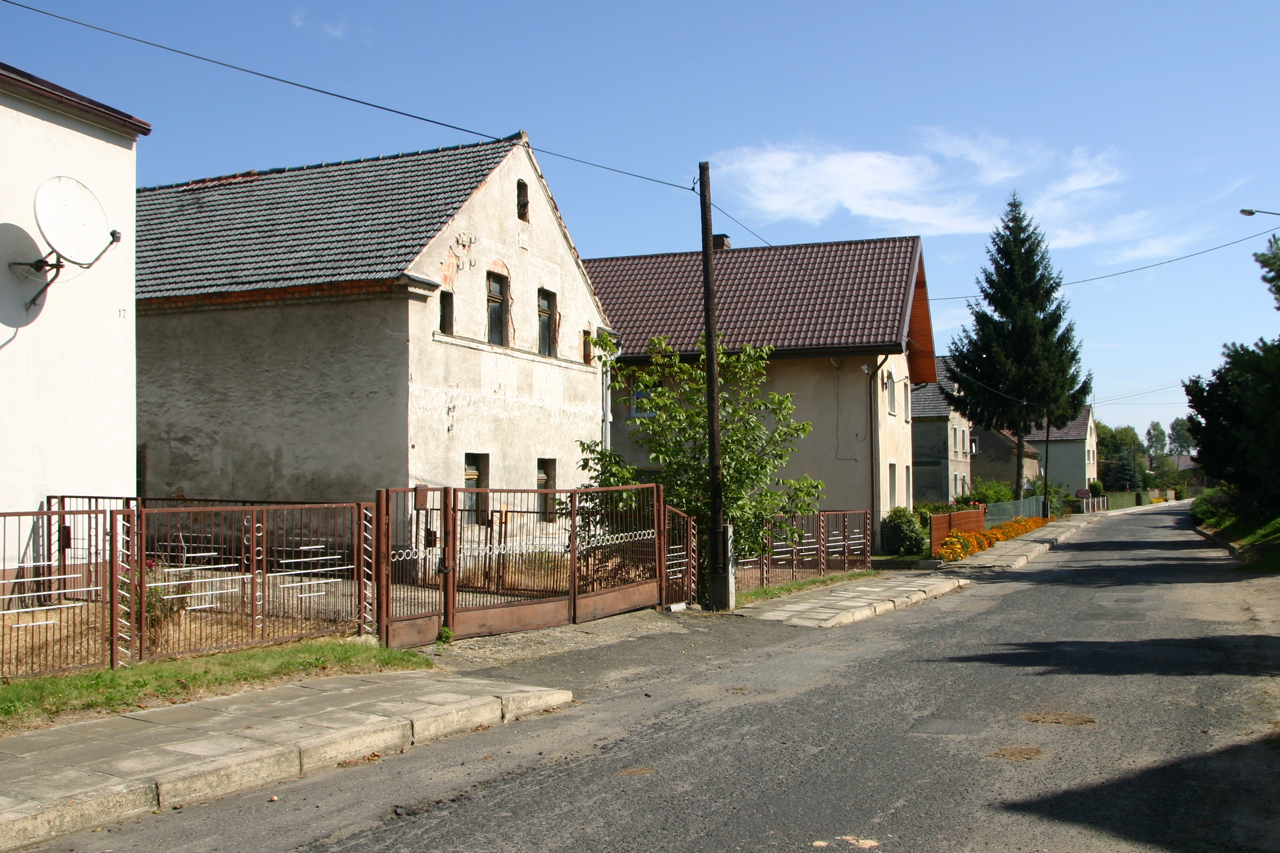

- Location within Poland
- Coordinates: 50°20′3″N 17°42′7″E
- Country: Poland
- Voivodeship: Opole
- County: Prudnik
- Gmina: Lubrza
- First mentioned: 1228
- Time zone: UTC+1 (CET)
  - Summer (DST): UTC+2 (CEST)
- Vehicle registration: OPR

Laskowice [laskɔˈvit͡sɛ] (German: Lasswitz) is a village in the administrative district of Gmina Lubrza, within Prudnik County, Opole Voivodeship, in southern Poland, close to the Czech border.

Nine Polish citizens were murdered by Nazi Germany in the village during World War II.

== See also ==
- Prudnik Land
