= Miloslav Gajdoš =

Czech double bass player and teacher (1948–2026)

Miloslav Gajdoš (13 April 1948 – 25 August 2026) was a Czech double bass player, music teacher and composer.

== Life and career ==
Miloslav Gajdoš was born in Město Albrechtice on 13 April 1948. Having begun with the violin, Gajdoš took bass lessons in Kroměříž with Alois Kříž, with Jiří Bortlíček in Brno, and with Ludwig Streicher. Between 1968 and 1972, he also studied composition with Zdeněk Zouhar. He was a prize winner at the International Double Bass Competition in Markneukirchen.

During his studies, Gajdoš played bass in the theater orchestra of Brno, where later he performed as a soloist. He played with the Moravian Philharmonic Olomouc, the Czech premiere of Giovanni Bottesini's First Double Bass Concerto, from which Gajdoš undertook, from the 1990s, several concert tours in the US and made his mark as one of the greatest bass virtuosos of the 20th century.

From 1973, Gajdoš was the Professor at the Conservatory of Kroměříž. He later taught, among others, in Moscow, Debrecen, Miskolc, Munich, Dresden, and Berlin and gave master classes in 1997 at New York's Juilliard School. His pupils included Radomír Žalud, Miloslav Bubeníček, Roman Koudelka, Radoslav Šašina, Miloslav Jelínek, Pavel Klečka, Martin Šranko, Eva Šašinková, Luděk Zakopal, Miloslav Raisigl, Petr Ries, and Jan Staněk.

Gajdoš edited more than 70 works for the double bass. He also composed sacred music works for solo double bass, several basses (from duo to quintet) for double bass and piano, as well as for double bass and orchestra. He also made his mark as a choral and orchestral conductor.

Gajdoš died on 25 August 2026, at the age of 78.
