= Nowy Browiniec =

- Village
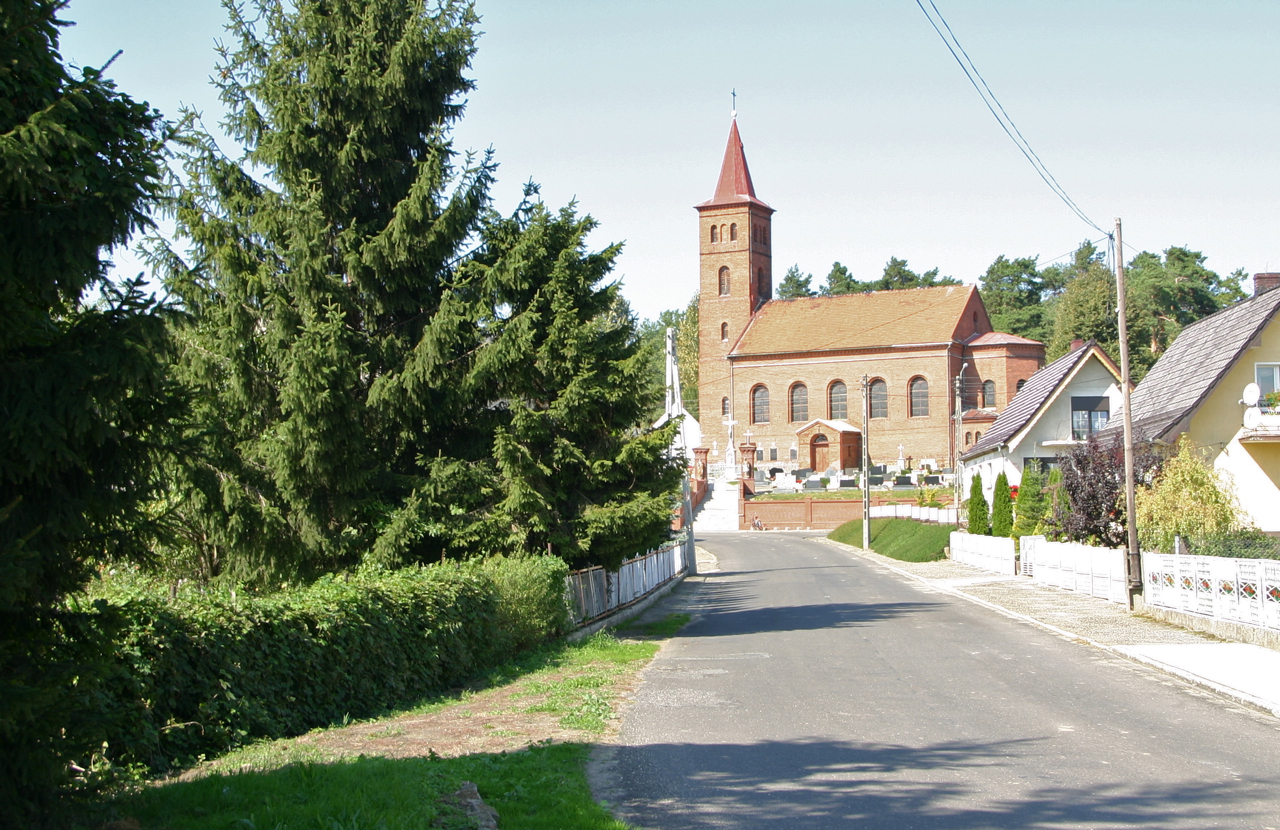

- Location within Poland
- Coordinates: 50°20′35″N 17°44′25″E
- Country: Poland
- Voivodeship: Opole
- County: Prudnik
- Gmina: Lubrza

Nowy Browiniec [ˈnɔvɨ brɔˈviɲɛt͡s] (German: Deutsch Probnitz) is a village in the administrative district of Gmina Lubrza, within Prudnik County, Opole Voivodeship, in south-western Poland, close to the Czech border.

== See also ==
- Prudnik Land
