= Trzebina, Opole Voivodeship =

Trzebina
- Village
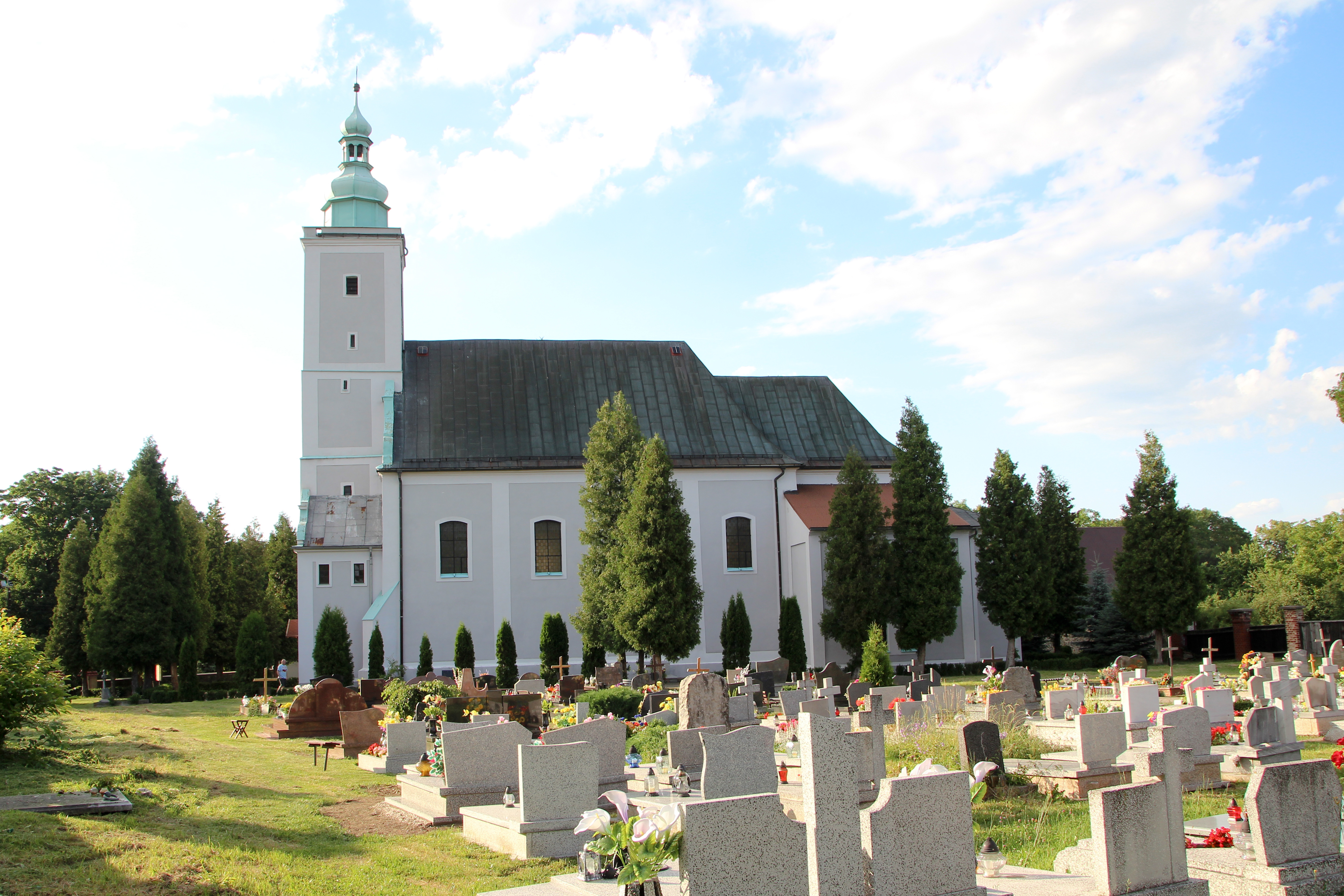
- Church of the Assumption in Trzebina

- Location within Poland
- Coordinates: 50°17′30″N 17°36′10″E
- Country: Poland
- Voivodeship: Opole
- County: Prudnik
- Gmina: Lubrza
- Elevation: 260 m (850 ft)

Population
  - Total: 806
- Time zone: UTC+1 (CET)
  - Summer (DST): UTC+2 (CEST)
- Vehicle registration: OPR

Trzebina [tʂɛˈbina] (German: Kunzendorf) is a village in Opole Voivodeship in southern Poland, near the Czech border. It is 6 km (4 mi) south of Lubrza, 4 km (2 mi) south-east of Prudnik, and 48 km (30 mi) south-west of the regional capital Opole.

It was granted town rights in 1542.

== Notable people ==
- Gebhard Leberecht von Blücher (1742–1819), Prussian field marshal

== See also ==
- Prudnik Land
