= Slavkov (Opava District) =

- Municipality
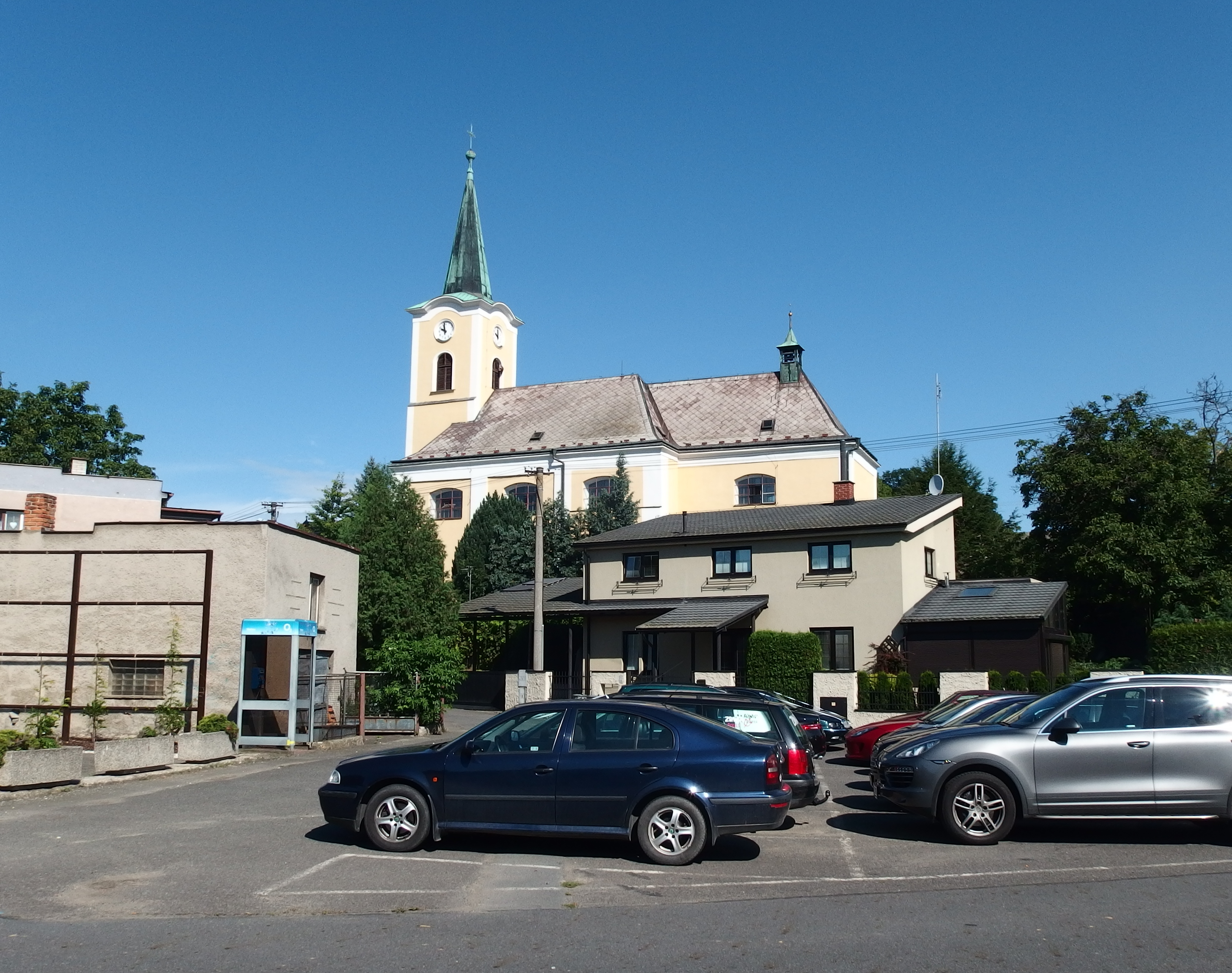
- Church of Saint Anne

- Flag Coat of arms

- Location in the Czech Republic
- Coordinates: 49°55′18″N 17°50′11″E
- Country: Czech Republic
- Region: Moravian-Silesian
- District: Opava
- First mentioned: 1224

Area
  - Total: 11.04 km^{2} (4.26 sq mi)
- Elevation: 299 m (981 ft)

Population (2026-01-01)
  - Total: 2,131
  - Density: 193.0/km^{2} (499.9/sq mi)
- Time zone: UTC+1 (CET)
  - Summer (DST): UTC+2 (CEST)
- Postal code: 747 57
- Website: www.slavkov-u-opavy.cz

Slavkov is a municipality and village in Opava District in the Moravian-Silesian Region of the Czech Republic. It has about 2,100 inhabitants.

== Geography ==
Slavkov is located about 4 kilometres (2 mi) southwest of Opava and 31 km (19 mi) west of Ostrava. It lies mostly in the Nízký Jeseník range, only a small part of the municipal territory in the east extends into the Opava Hilly Land. The highest point is at 339 m (1,112 ft) above sea level. The Hvozdnice River flows through the southern municipal border and supplies here a system of fishponds. This system of ponds and its surroundings is protected as the Hvozdnice Nature Reserve.

== History ==
The first written mention of Slavkov is from 1224, when King Ottokar I donated the village to the city of Opava. From 1255 until the end of the 15th century, Slavkov was a property of the Fulštejn family. The next owners were the Vlk of Konecchlumí family, which owned the village until 1597. In the next decades, the owners often changed. In 1636–1677, the village was held by the Sedlnický of Choltice family. From 1677, Slavkov was owned by the Podstatský of Prusínovice family.

== Demographics ==
Historical population

Year	Pop.	±%
1869	1,006	—
1880	1,021	+1.5%
1890	1,098	+7.5%
1900	1,087	−1.0%
1910	1,122	+3.2%

Year	Pop.	±%
1921	1,107	−1.3%
1930	1,295	+17.0%
1950	1,055	−18.5%
1961	1,231	+16.7%
1970	1,177	−4.4%

Year	Pop.	±%
1980	1,388	+17.9%
1991	1,544	+11.2%
2001	1,639	+6.2%
2011	1,826	+11.4%
2021	2,033	+11.3%

Source: Censuses

== Transport ==
Slavkov is located on the railway line Opava–Svobodné Heřmanice, but trains run on it only on weekends and holidays during the summer season.

== Sights ==
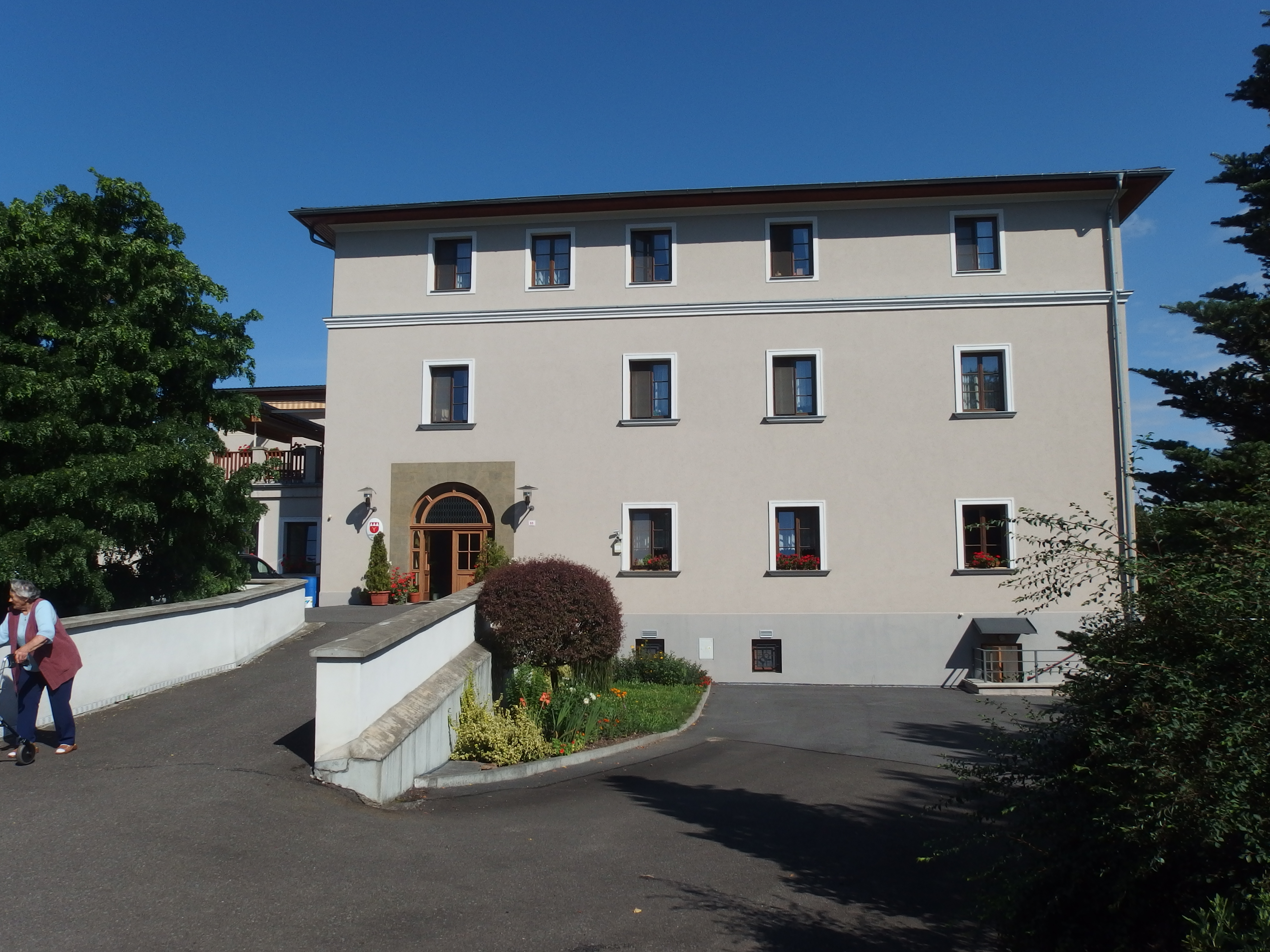
Slavkov Castle

The main landmark of Slavkov is the Church of Saint Anne. It was built in 1657 on the site of an older church. In the first half of the 19th century, it was modified to its present form. The Chapel of Saint Barbara was added to the church in the 19th century.

A notable building is the Slavkov Castle. It was originally a Renaissance residence built in 1572–1586, but it was completely rebuilt in the 20th century. Today it houses a retirement home.
