= Dívčí Hrad =

- Municipality
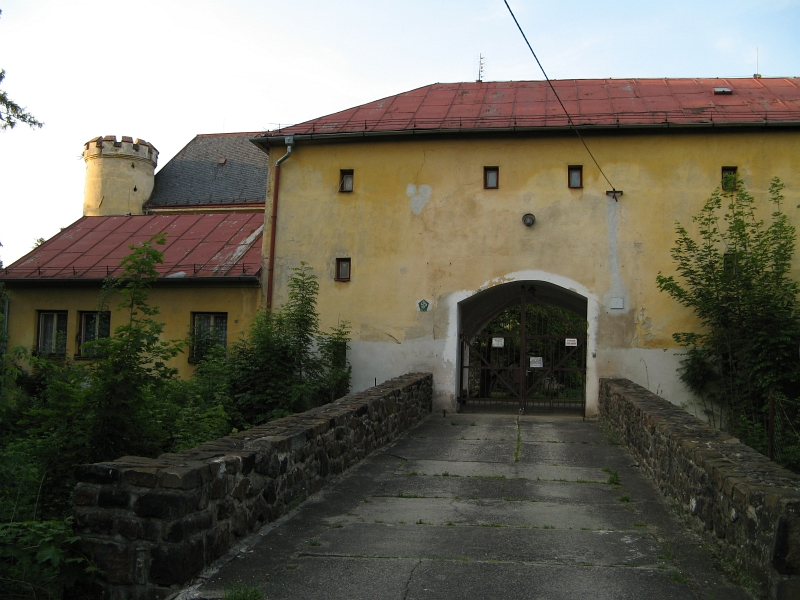
- Dívčí Hrad Castle

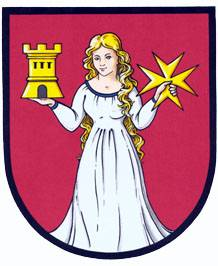
- Flag Coat of arms

- Location in the Czech Republic
- Coordinates: 50°14′38″N 17°38′3″E
- Country: Czech Republic
- Region: Moravian-Silesian
- District: Bruntál
- First mentioned: 1267

Area
  - Total: 12.05 km^{2} (4.65 sq mi)
- Elevation: 307 m (1,007 ft)

Population (2026-01-01)
  - Total: 305
  - Density: 25.3/km^{2} (65.6/sq mi)
- Time zone: UTC+1 (CET)
  - Summer (DST): UTC+2 (CEST)
- Postal code: 793 99
- Website: www.divcihrad.cz

Dívčí Hrad (German: Maidelberg) is a municipality and village in Bruntál District in the Moravian-Silesian Region of the Czech Republic. It has about 300 inhabitants.

== Etymology ==
The name means 'maiden's castle' in Czech.

== Geography ==
Dívčí Hrad is located about 30 kilometres (19 mi) north of Bruntál and 61 km (38 mi) northeast of Ostrava. It is situated in the Osoblažsko microregion on the border with Poland. It lies in the Zlatohorská Highlands. The highest point is the hill Hraniční kopec at 352 m (1,155 ft) above sea level, located on the Czech–Polish border.

The Osoblaha River flows across the municipality. There are two fishponds in the municipal territory: Dívčí Hrad and Pitárno.

Oblík Nature Monument consists of a basalt hill with stratigraphic and paleontological significance. There are fossils of crinoids, corals, cephalopods and brachiopods from the Cretaceous. It has an area of 23.3 ha (58 acres).

== History ==
The first written mention of Dívčí Hrad is in the will of Bishop Bruno von Schauenburg from 1267, when the local castle was called Deuviz.

In 1474, the castle was conquered and destroyed by the army of Matthias Corvinus. Around 1573, a new Renaissance castle was built by Hynek Bruntálský of Vrbno on the site of the castle ruin. In 1580, Dívčí Hrad was bought by the Sedlnický of Choltice family, and after it was confiscated from them in 1622, it was acquired by the Teutonic Order. In 1768, Dívčí Hrad was acquired by the Knights Hospitaller, who owned the castle until the 20th century.

From 1976 to 1990, Dívčí Hrad was a municipal part of Osoblaha. Since 1990, it has been a separate municipality.

== Demographics ==
Historical population

Year	Pop.	±%
1869	1,139	—
1880	1,112	−2.4%
1890	1,045	−6.0%
1900	959	−8.2%
1910	883	−7.9%

Year	Pop.	±%
1921	881	−0.2%
1930	812	−7.8%
1950	189	−76.7%
1961	354	+87.3%
1970	308	−13.0%

Year	Pop.	±%
1980	310	+0.6%
1991	226	−27.1%
2001	272	+20.4%
2011	243	−10.7%
2021	264	+8.6%

Source: Censuses

== Transport ==
Dívčí Hrad is served by the Dívčí Hrad stop on the narrow-gauge Třemešná ve Slezsku–Osoblaha railway, but the stop is located just outside the municipal territory.

== Sights ==
The main landmark is the Dívčí Hrad Castle. This Renaissance castle is architecturally related to northern Italian churches with elements of fortress architecture. The castle was severely damaged during the World War II and then reconstructed.
