= Krzyżkowice =

- Village
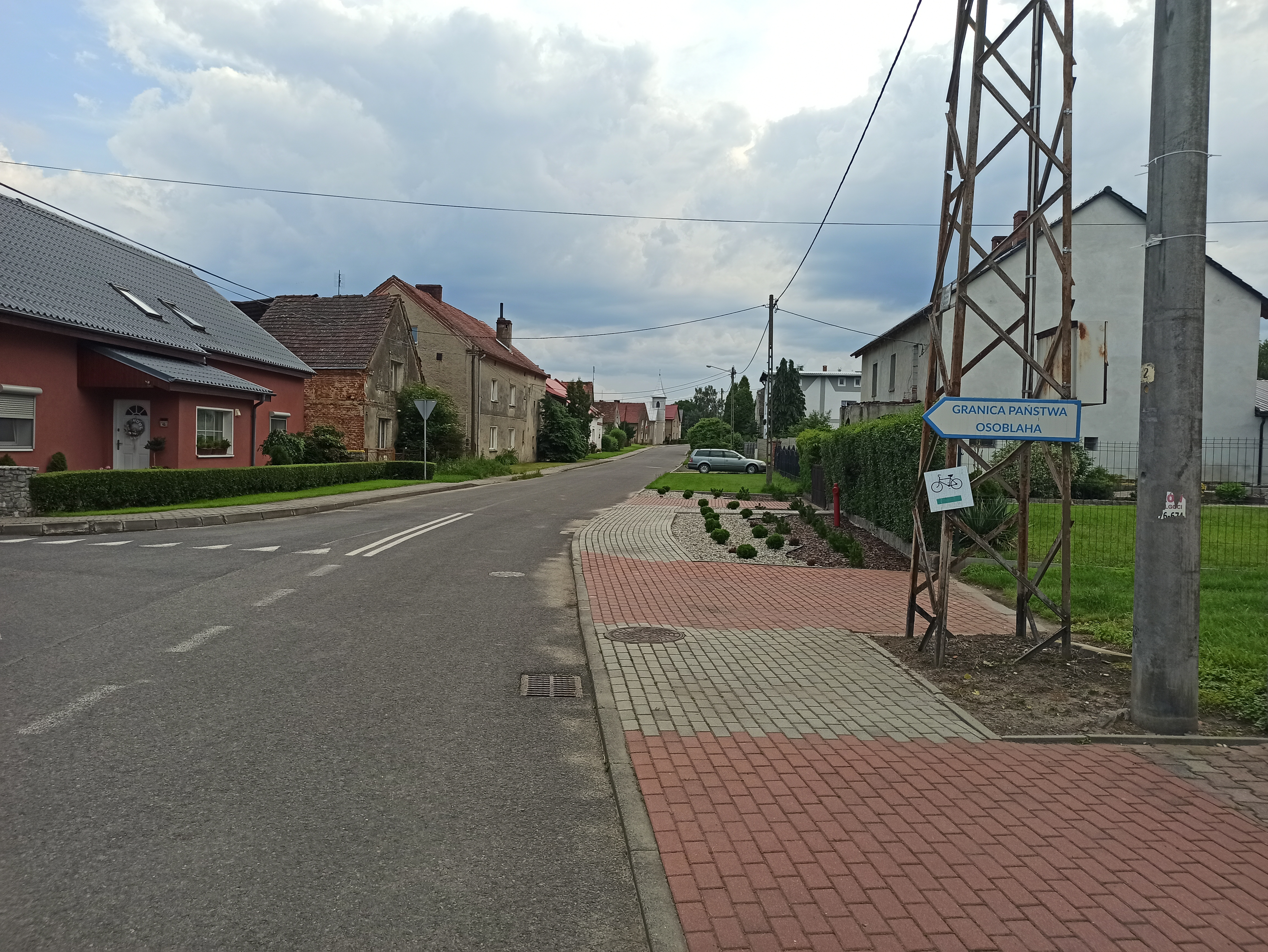
- Interactive map of Krzyżkowice
- Location within Poland
- Coordinates: 50°17′36″N 17°40′18″E
- Country: Poland
- Voivodeship: Opole
- County: Prudnik
- Gmina: Lubrza
- Elevation: 240 m (790 ft)
- Population: 240

Krzyżkowice [kʂɨʂkɔˈvit͡sɛ] (German: Kröschendorf, Czech: Křížkovice) is an Upper Silesian village in the administrative district of Gmina Lubrza, within Prudnik County, Opole Voivodeship, in south-western Poland, close to the Czech border.
