= Třemešná ve Slezsku–Osoblaha railway =

Narrow gauge railway line

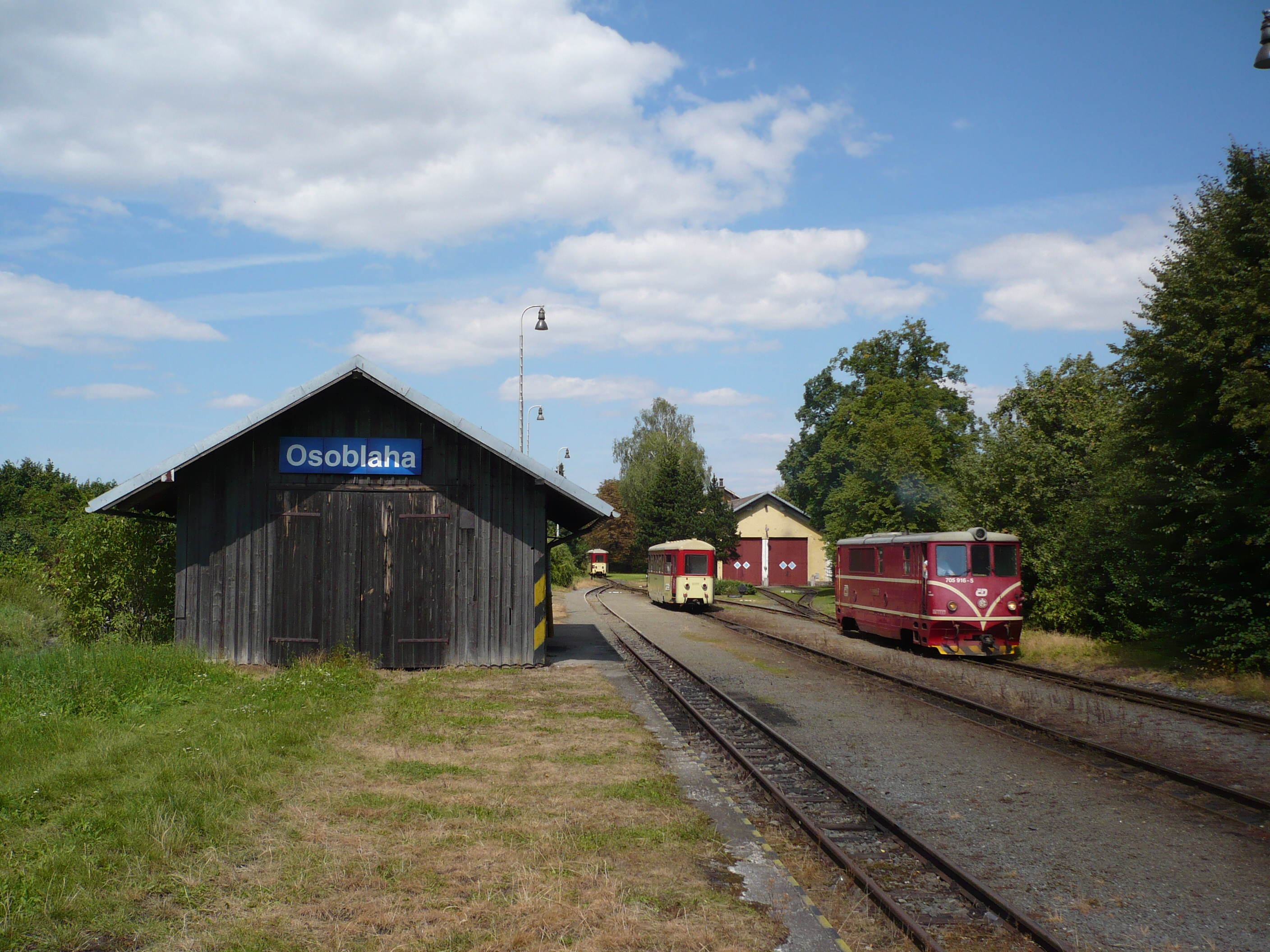
- ČD class 705 916-5 running round in Osoblaha

Overview
- Locale: Czech Republic; 50°11′59.92″N 17°34′25.14″E
- Termini: Třemešná; Osoblaha

History
- Opened: 14 December 1898

Technical
- Track gauge: 760 mm (2 ft 5 15/16 in) Bosnian gauge

The Třemešná ve Slezsku–Osoblaha railway is a narrow-gauge railway connecting Třemešná on the Krnov–Głuchołazy line with Osoblaha on the Czech–Polish border. It is one of the three remaining narrow gauge railway lines with regular passenger traffic in the Czech Republic and the last one operated by the state-owned railway company České dráhy.

== History ==
In the 1870s the owners of a sugar refinery in Osoblaha were looking for a railway connection of their town. From a financial point of view, the best alternative was a connection to the railway network in neighbouring Prussia. However, the government in Vienna refused it on political and military grounds. On 14 December 1898 a line from Třemešná was opened. Since 1958 the trains are operated by diesel-electric locomotives T 47.0.

== See also ==
- Jindřichův Hradec narrow-gauge railway
