= Lubrza, Opole Voivodeship =

Lubrza
- Village
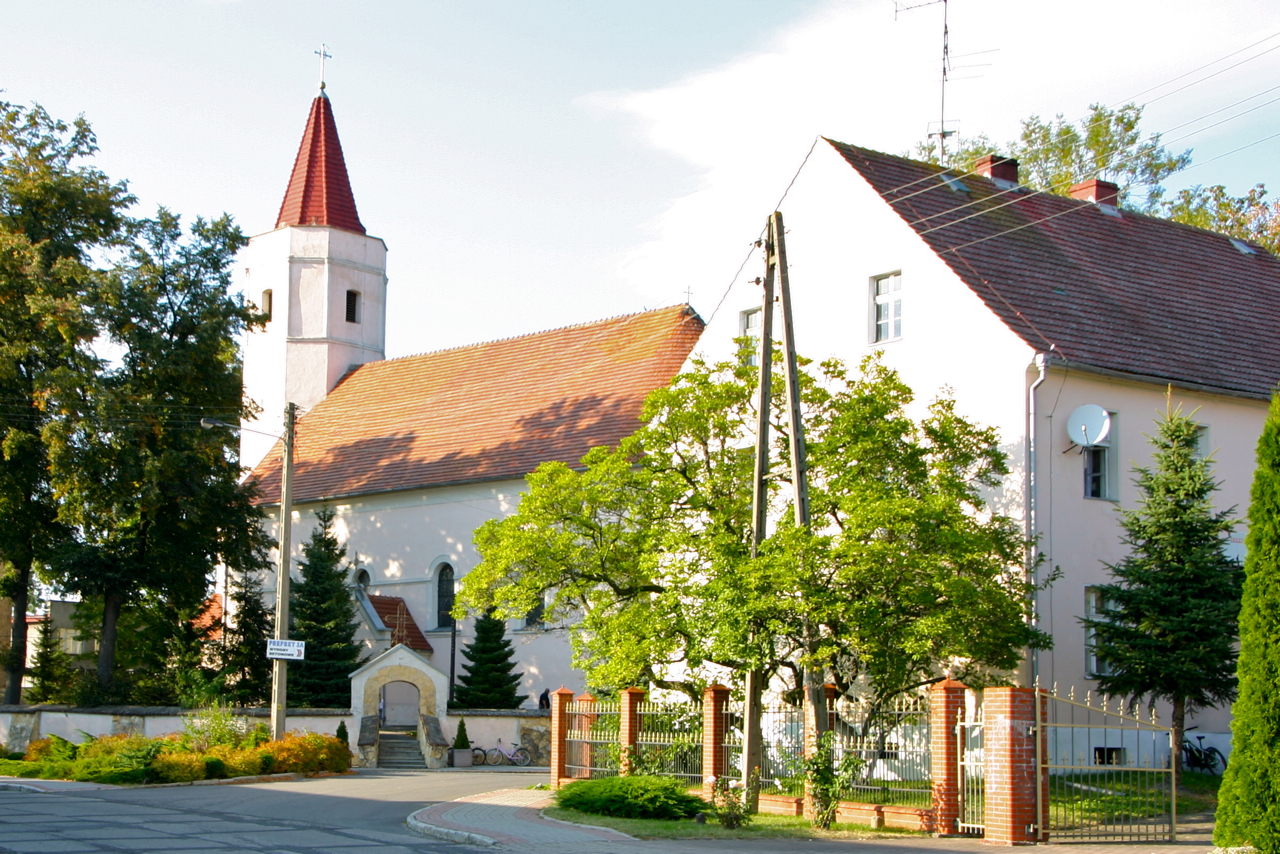
- Saint James church in Lubrza

- Flag Coat of arms

- Location within Poland
- Coordinates: 50°20′9″N 17°37′34″E
- Country: Poland
- Voivodeship: Opole
- County: Prudnik
- Gmina: Lubrza
- First mentioned: 1233

Population
  - Total: 965
- Time zone: UTC+1 (CET)
  - Summer (DST): UTC+2 (CEST)
- Vehicle registration: OPR
- Website: http://www.lubrza.opole.pl

Lubrza [ˈlubʐa] (German: Leuber) is a village in Prudnik County, Opole Voivodeship, in southern Poland, close to the Czech border. It is the seat of the gmina (administrative district) called Gmina Lubrza. It had a population of 965 in December 2013.

== Name ==
The village has had numerous names in its history. It was named Lubra by its founder, and over the next few centuries was known as Lubrac, Lubrzi and Leuber (in that order.) Leuber being the German name for the village, it kept that name until it became again part of Poland in 1945, switching to its current name of Lubrza. Historically, it was also known in Polish as Lubrzo.

== History ==
The village was first mentioned in the will of the founder of the village, dated 1233. For the next few centuries, there were a few scattered references to the village, often under different names. Over all this time, Lubrza had been ruled by the Piast dynasty, first as part of Poland then part of the Duchies of Silesia, which passed under the suzerainty of the neighbouring Kingdom of Bohemia. It was taken by the Habsburg monarchy in 1526, only to be taken by Prussia in 1742 in the Silesian Wars. After the Franco-Prussian wars and the creation of a unified Germany, Lubrza became part of the German Empire. The Soviet Red Army occupied the village in 1945, and it became again part of Poland when the East German-Polish border was set out that year (see Territorial changes of Poland after World War II).

== See also ==
- Prudnik Land
