= Město Albrechtice =

- Town
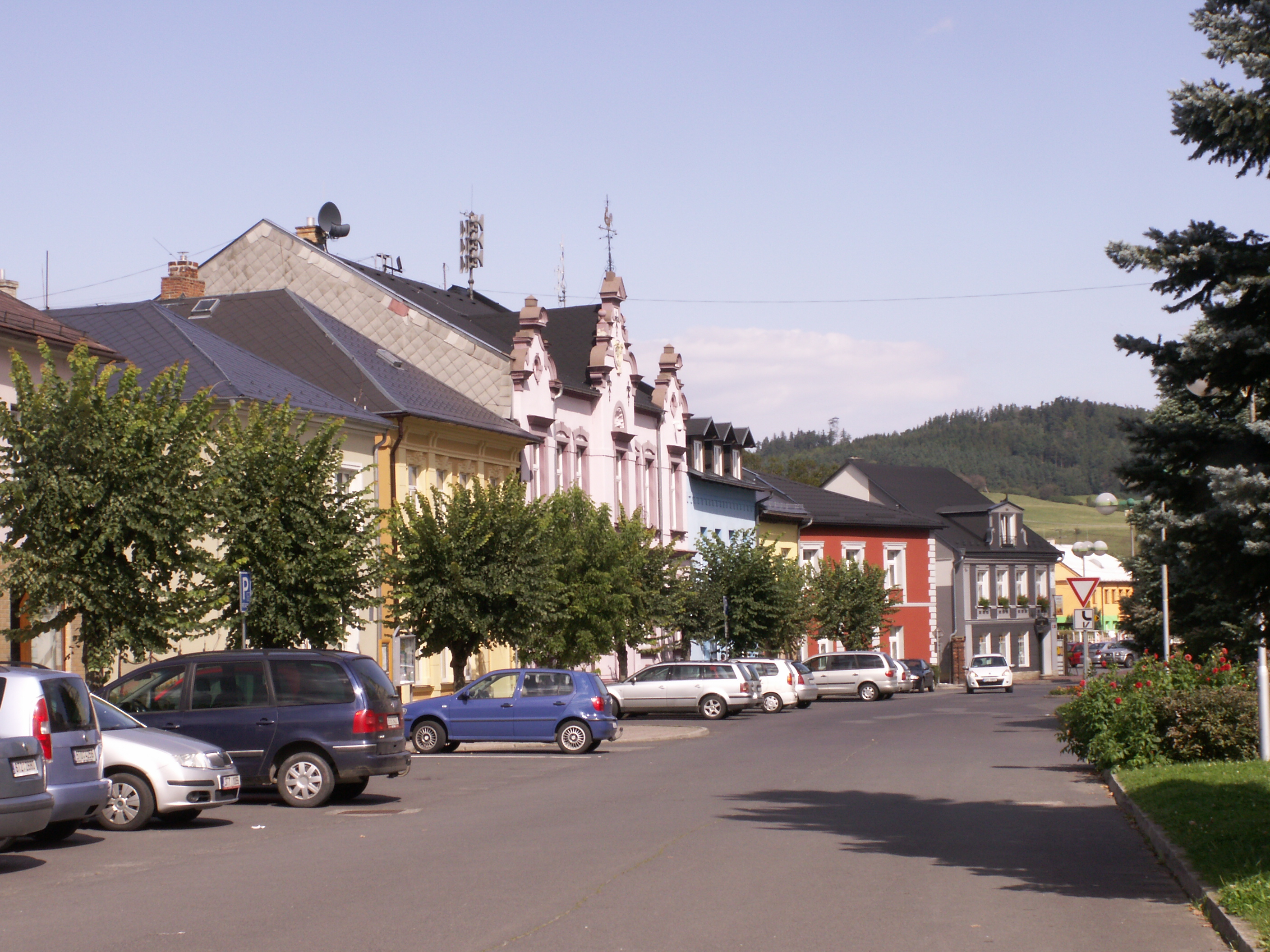
- Town square

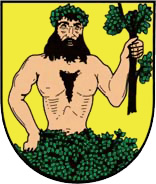
- Flag Coat of arms

- Location in the Czech Republic
- Coordinates: 50°9′47″N 17°34′30″E
- Country: Czech Republic
- Region: Moravian-Silesian
- District: Bruntál
- First mentioned: 1377

Government
  - Mayor: Jana Murová (ANO)

Area
  - Total: 65.26 km^{2} (25.20 sq mi)
- Elevation: 350 m (1,150 ft)

Population (2026-01-01)
  - Total: 3,338
  - Density: 51.15/km^{2} (132.5/sq mi)
- Time zone: UTC+1 (CET)
  - Summer (DST): UTC+2 (CEST)
- Postal code: 793 95
- Website: www.mesto-albrechtice.cz

Město Albrechtice (Czech pronunciation: [ˈmɲɛsto ˈalbrɛxcɪtsɛ]; German: Olbersdorf) is a town in Bruntál District in the Moravian-Silesian Region of the Czech Republic. It has about 3,300 inhabitants. The town is located on the Opavice River in the Zlatohorská Highlands and is the largest municipality in the Osoblažsko microregion.

== Administrative division ==
Město Albrechtice consists of five municipal parts (in brackets population according to the 2021 census):

- Město Albrechtice (2,502)
- Burkvíz (29)
- Česká Ves (16)
- Dlouhá Voda (18)
- Hynčice (399)
- Linhartovy (175)
- Opavice (120)
- Piskořov (16)
- Valštejn (29)
- Žáry (83)

== Geography ==
Město Albrechtice is located about 20 kilometres (12 mi) north of Bruntál and 58 km (36 mi) northwest of Ostrava. It lies in the Zlatohorská Highlands and is the gateway to the Osoblažsko microregion. The highest point is the mountain Kutný vrch at 869 m (2,851 ft) above sea level. The Opavice River flows through the town.

== History ==
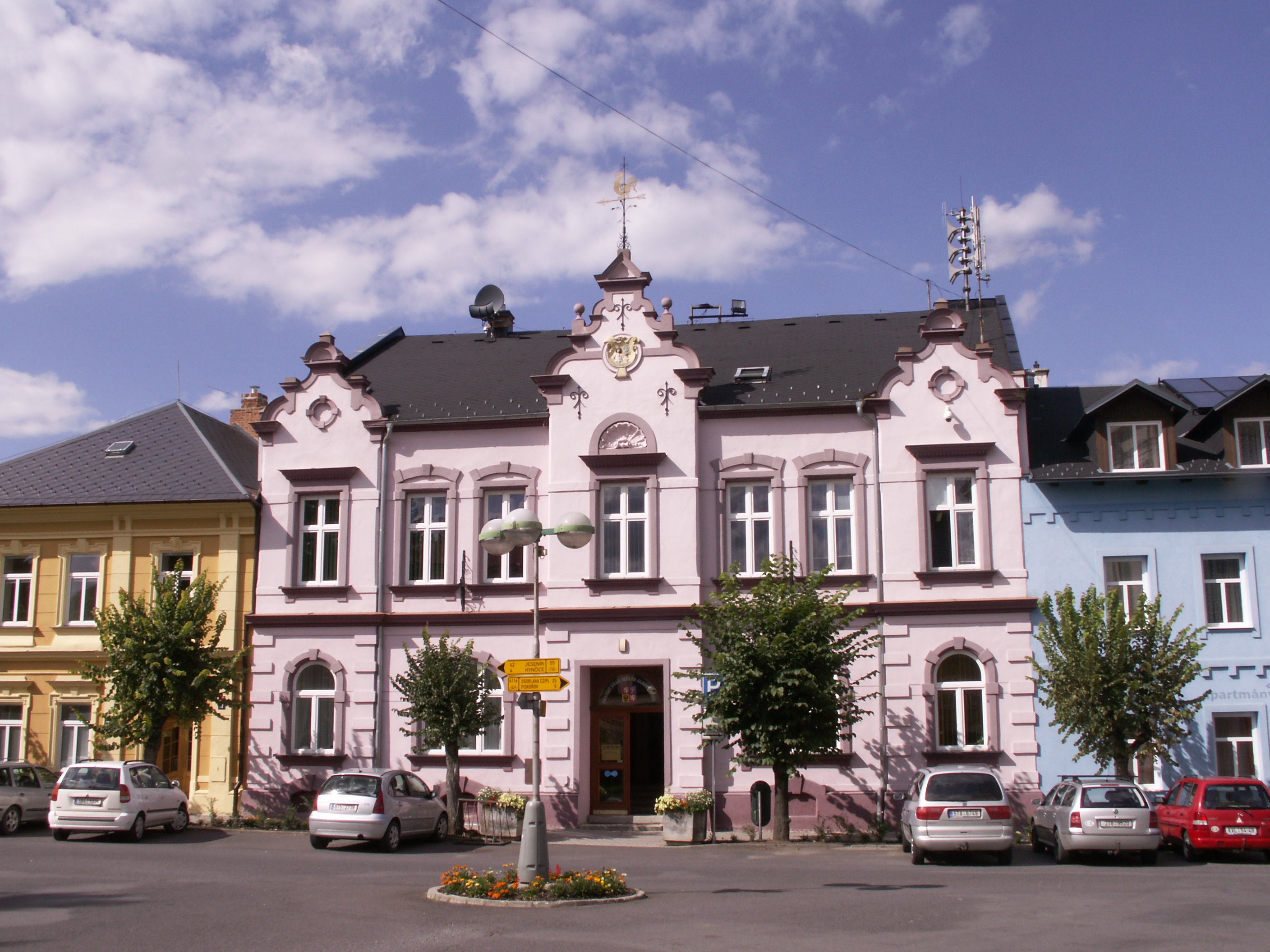
Town hall on the town square

The first written mention of Albrechtice is from 1377, in the deed of division of Duchy of Troppau and Duchy of Krnov. In 1474, the local fort was conquered and destroyed by the army of Matthias Corvinus. In 1492, during the rule of the Makrot family (1492–1503), Albrechtice was promoted to a town by King Vladislaus II.

In 1503, the estate was acquired by the Sup of Fulštejn family. From 1623 to 1773, it was owned by the Jesuits. Then Albrechtice was taken by the royal chamber and in 1776 it became a municipal town with its own self-government. The town was looted and badly damaged by Prussian army in 1779, during the War of the Bavarian Succession.

According to the Austro-Hungarian census of 1910, the town had 2,438 inhabitants, all of them were German-speaking. Jews were not allowed to declare Yiddish, most of them thus declared the German language as their native. Most populous religious groups were Roman Catholics with 2,255 (92.5%), followed by Protestants with 161 (6.6%).

== Demographics ==
Historical population

Year	Pop.	±%
1869	6,335	—
1880	6,371	+0.6%
1890	6,230	−2.2%
1900	5,404	−13.3%
1910	5,219	−3.4%

Year	Pop.	±%
1921	5,125	−1.8%
1930	5,268	+2.8%
1950	3,344	−36.5%
1961	3,497	+4.6%
1970	3,237	−7.4%

Year	Pop.	±%
1980	3,407	+5.3%
1991	3,580	+5.1%
2001	3,626	+1.3%
2011	3,459	−4.6%
2021	3,387	−2.1%

Source: Censuses

== Transport ==
Město Albrechtice is located on the railway line Krnov–Jeseník.

== Sport ==
The town is equipped by an outdoor swimming pool.

== Sights ==
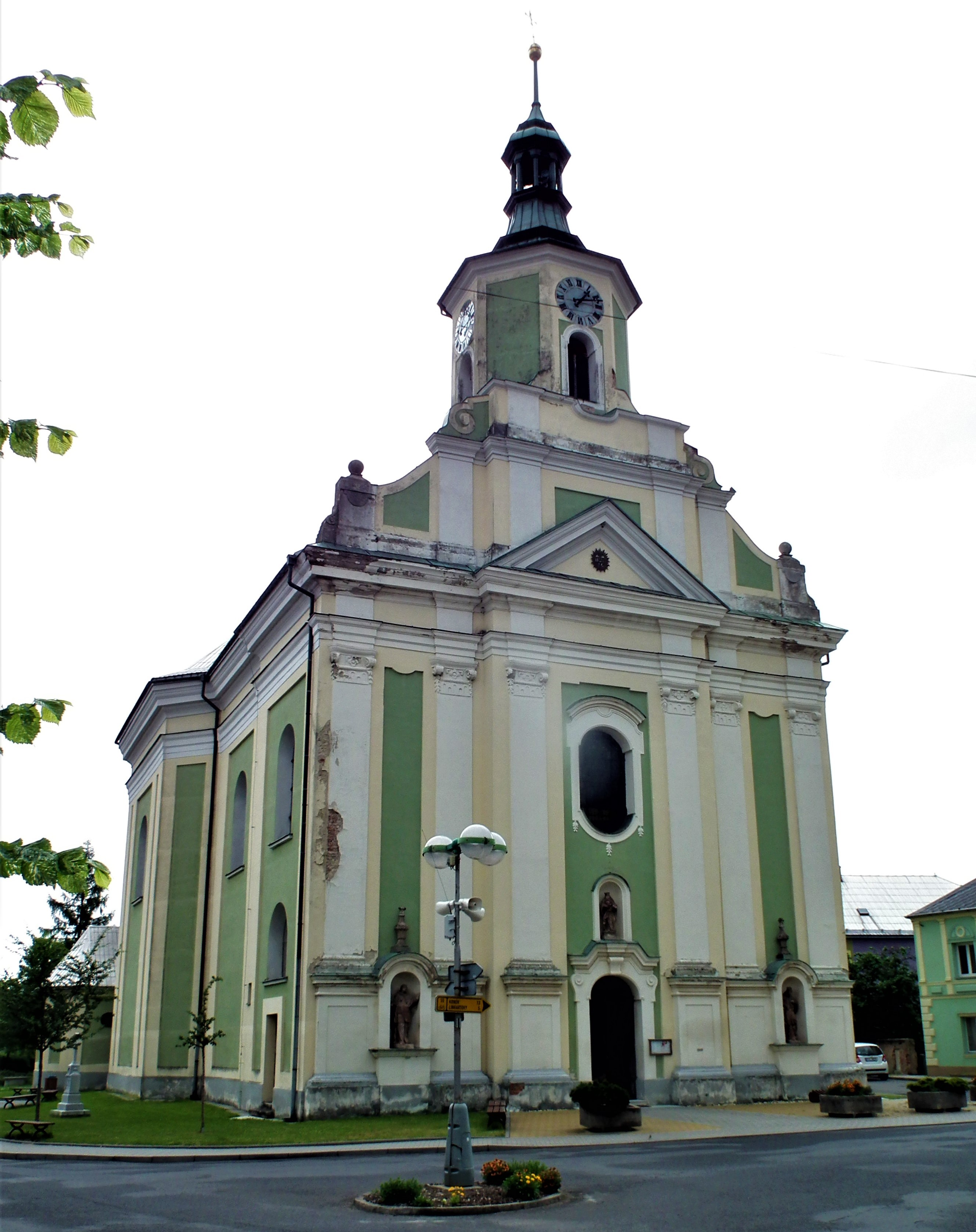
Church of the Visitation of Our Lady

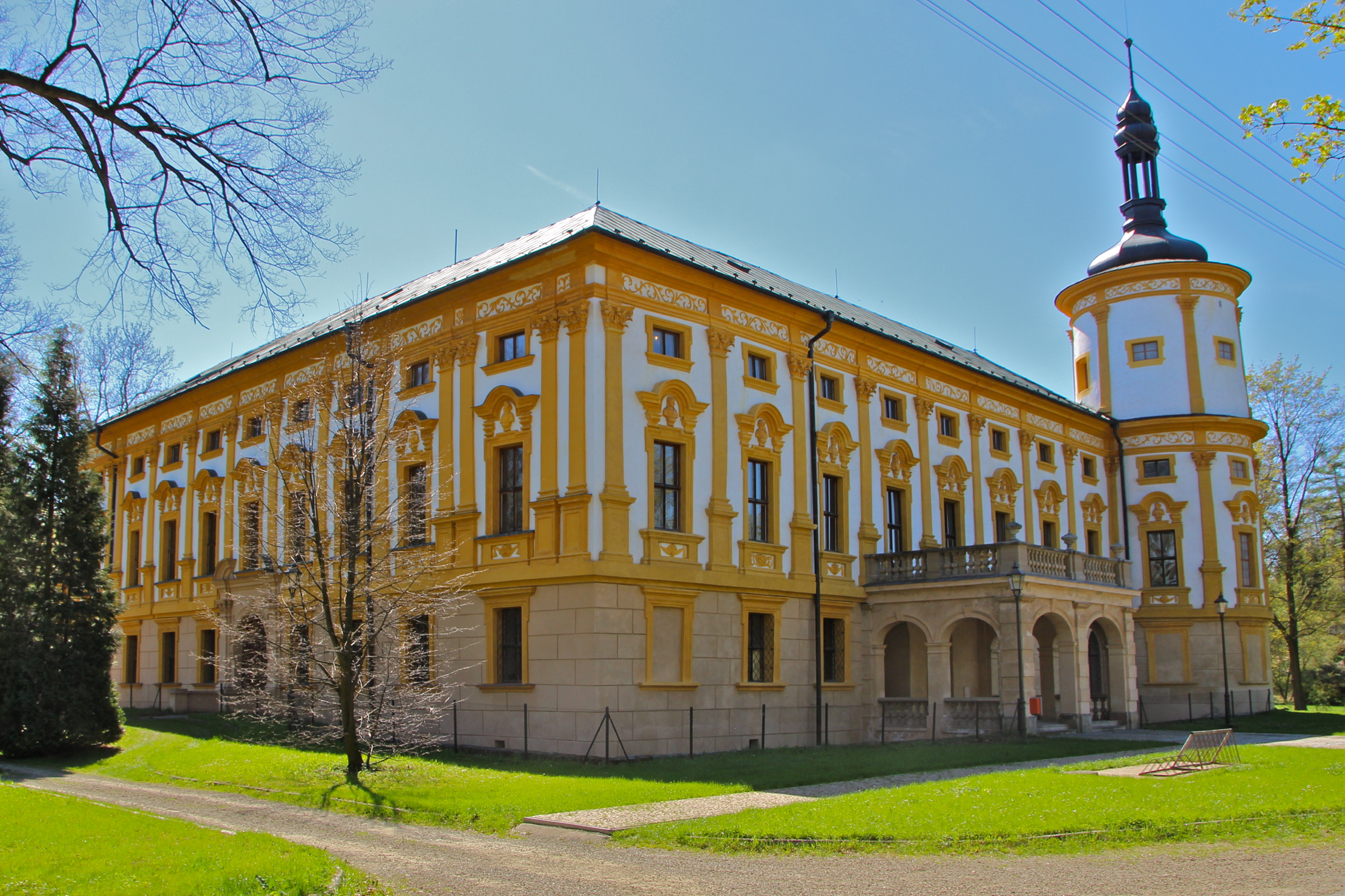
Linhartovy Castle

The main landmark of the town square and the whole town proper is the Church of the Visitation of Our Lady. It was built in the late Baroque style in 1747–1752 and replaced an older church from 1610, which was destroyed by the fire in 1746. Other sights on the town square include the Column of St. Anne from 1719 and the Empire style house No. 21 with well-preserved renaissance interior (cross vault) from the second half of the 16th century.

The most important monument is the Linhartovy Castle, located in Linhartovy. It was built at the end of 16th century, converting the former fortress from the 14th century into a Renaissance mansion. The new owner, the Sedlnický of Choltice family, had rebuilt the castle to its present Baroque appearance in 1702, and a French-style park was founded. In the 19th century the park was converted into a nature landscape park. During World War II, the castle was damaged by a fire and in the following decades fell into disrepair. Today the castle is the town property, it is reconstructed and is open to public.

There are numerous folk architecture monuments in the town. The preserved folk architecture in Piskořov is protected as a village monument zone. In Hynčice there are many cottages from the 18th and 19th century and the church complex formed by the late Baroque Church of St. Nicholas from 1782, rectory, a chapel and a gate.

On the hill Hraniční vrch at 536 metres (1,759 ft) by the Czech–Polish border there is a unique double observation tower. It was created in 2011 by connecting two unused antenna towers.

In Hynčice is located a private gallery of sculptures of life-size dinosaurs, sculptures, fairy-tale creatures and animals, called Eldorádo. It was established in the 1950s and is sometimes called as the first "dinopark" in the Czech Republic.

== Notable people ==
- Gottfried Rieger (1764–1855), composer and conductor
- Leopold von Sedlnitzky (1787–1871), German bishop
- Julio Deutsch (1859–1922), Croatian architect
- Miloslav Gajdoš (1948–2026), musician
- Loukas Vyntra (born 1981), footballer

== Twin towns – sister cities ==
Město Albrechtice is twinned with:

- Biała, Poland
- Głubczyce, Poland
- Komprachcice, Poland
- Precenicco, Italy
