= Osoblaha =

Municipality in the Czech Republic

- Municipality
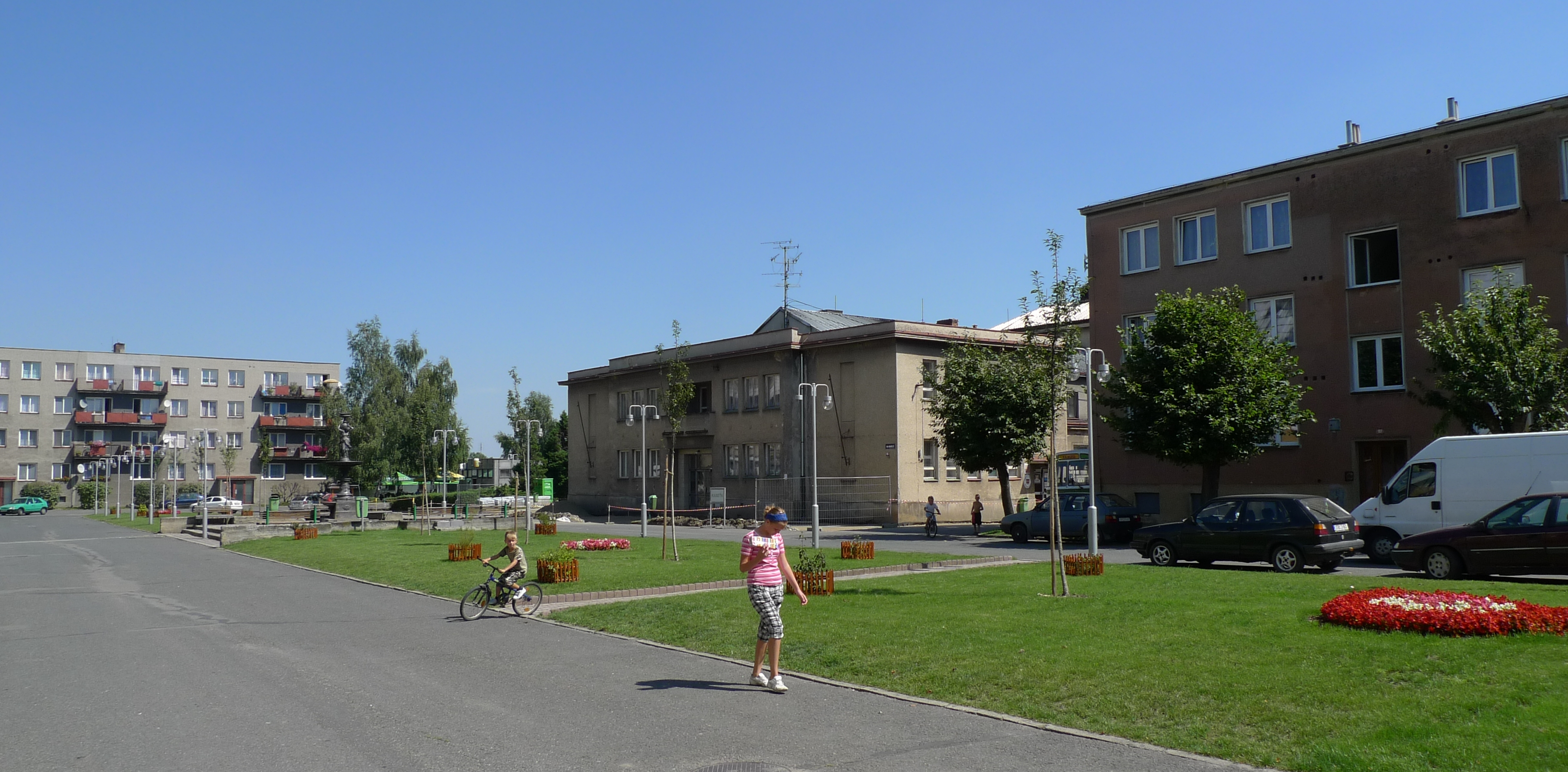
- Main square

- Flag Coat of arms

- Location in the Czech Republic
- Coordinates: 50°16′31″N 17°42′55″E
- Country: Czech Republic
- Region: Moravian-Silesian
- District: Bruntál
- First mentioned: 1233

Area
  - Total: 18.25 km^{2} (7.05 sq mi)
- Elevation: 220 m (720 ft)

Population (2026-01-01)
  - Total: 1,016
  - Density: 55.67/km^{2} (144.2/sq mi)
- Time zone: UTC+1 (CET)
  - Summer (DST): UTC+2 (CEST)
- Postal code: 793 99
- Website: www.osoblaha.cz

Osoblaha (Czech pronunciation: [ˈosoblaɦa]; German: Hotzenplotz, Polish: Osobłoga) is a municipality and village in Bruntál District in the Moravian-Silesian Region of the Czech Republic. It has about 1,000 inhabitants.

== Etymology ==
The Czech name of the village came from Latin names of two local watercourses, Osoblaha and Planá, in Latin Ossa and Plavia.

The German name Hotzenplotz was derived from the German words Holzen Platz (literally 'wooden place') and has its origin in oak forests in the area. It served the German writer Otfried Preußler for naming his famous children's book character of "The Robber Hotzenplotz".

== Geography ==
Osoblaha is located about 36 kilometres (22 mi) north of Bruntál and 46 km (29 mi) south of Opole. It lies in the Osoblažsko microregion on the border with Poland. It lies in the Opava Hilly Land. The Osoblaha River flows through the municipality and the Prudnik connects it near the Czech–Polish border.

In the territory of Osoblaha lies the former village of Studnice, which was abandoned in 1971.

== History ==
The first written mention of Osoblaha is from 1233. The village gained town rights in 1251, which opened the way for its subsequent economic development.

The Jewish population in Osoblaha was first documented in the 14th century. During the 19th century, Jews made up 30% of the town's population. However, they left the town before World War II.

According to the Austro-Hungarian census of 1910, the town had 2,853 inhabitants, almost all of whom declared themselves to be German-speaking. The main religious groups were Roman Catholics with 2,779 (97.4%), followed by Jews with 58 (2%).

From 1938 to 1945, Osoblaha was annexed by Nazi Germany and administered as a part of the Reichsgau Sudetenland. Although Osoblaha was the first town in the Czech lands to be liberated, in March 1945, the bitter fighting caused the destruction of 90% of all buildings. The German-speaking population was expelled and the town became significantly depopulated. In 1960, the municipality lost its town status.

== Demographics ==
Historical population

Year	Pop.	±%
1869	3,682	—
1880	4,012	+9.0%
1890	3,622	−9.7%
1900	3,199	−11.7%
1910	2,853	−10.8%

Year	Pop.	±%
1921	2,664	−6.6%
1930	2,383	−10.5%
1950	563	−76.4%
1961	770	+36.8%
1970	821	+6.6%

Year	Pop.	±%
1980	828	+0.9%
1991	1,127	+36.1%
2001	1,153	+2.3%
2011	1,049	−9.0%
2021	978	−6.8%

Source: Censuses

== Transport ==
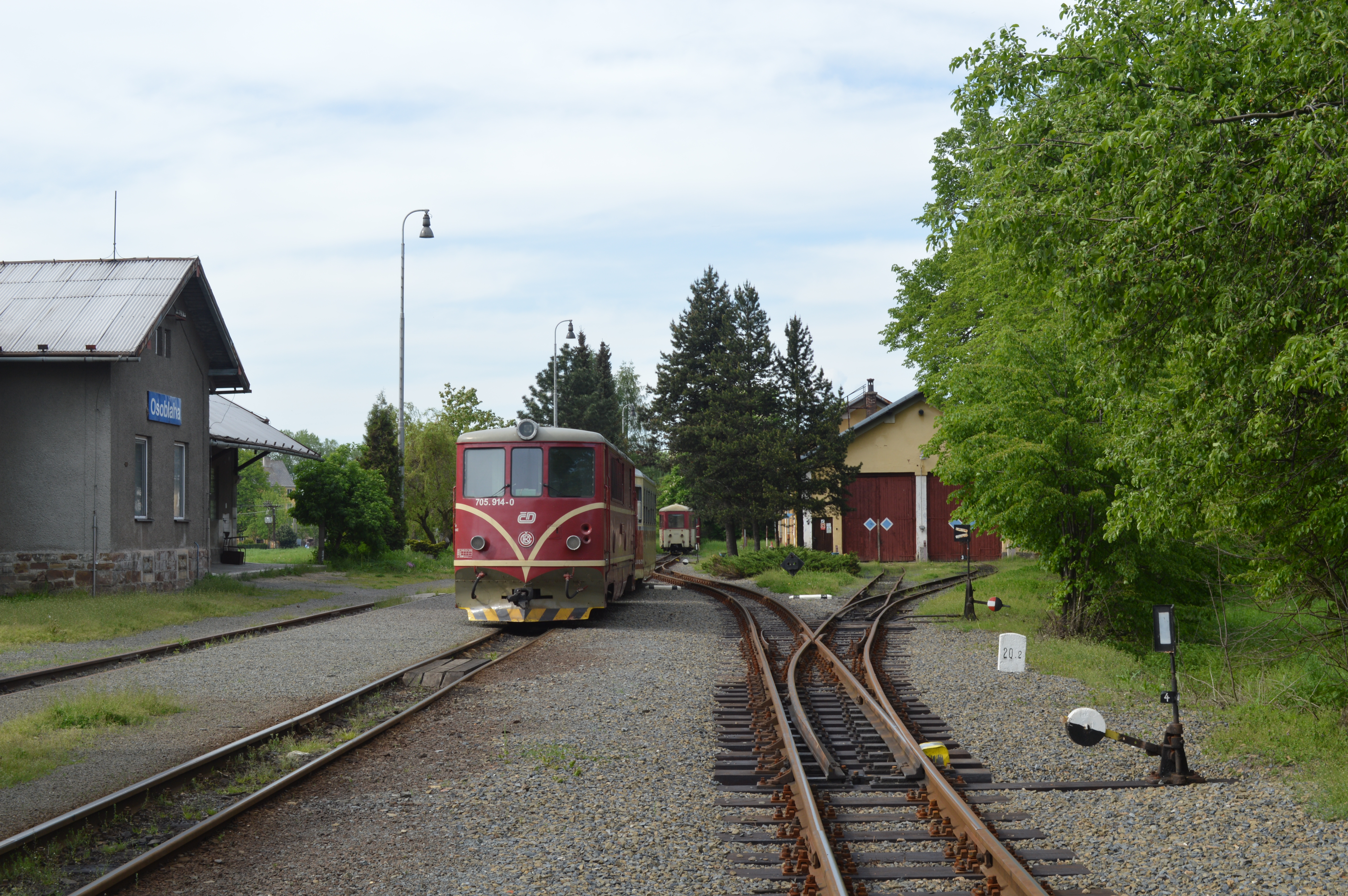
Train station

Osoblaha is the start and terminus of the narrow-gauge Třemešná ve Slezsku–Osoblaha railway.

== Sights ==
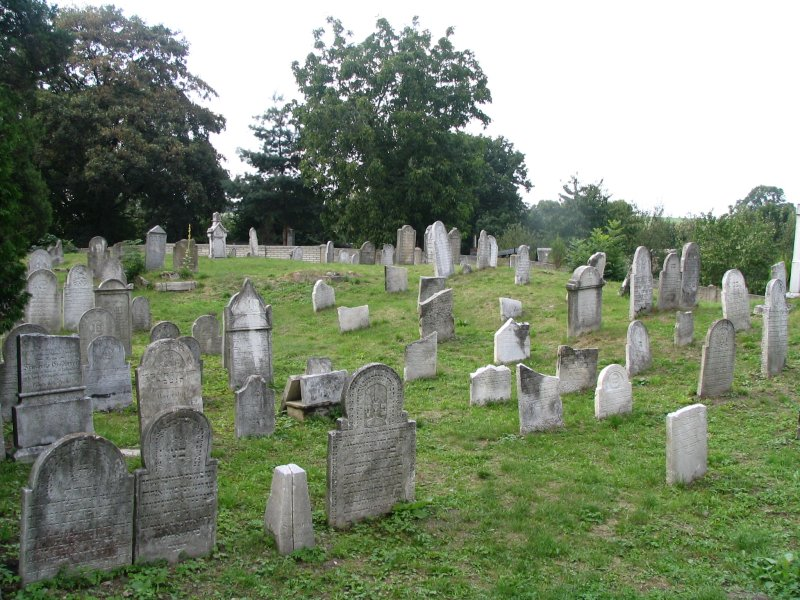
Jewish cemetery

The most important monument is the local Jewish cemetery, which is one of the most valuable in the Czech Republic. It was probably founded at the end of the 14th century and 313 tombstones have been preserved, the oldest of which dates from 1694.

Other monuments are the Baroque cemetery Church of Saint Nicholas built in 1756–1766, and a tiny remnant of the medieval town walls.

The narrow-gauge railway serves not only for transport but also as a tourist attraction. Steam trains run on weekends during the tourist season.

== Notable people ==
- Berthold Englisch (1851–1897), Austrian chess master

== Twin towns – sister cities ==
Osoblaha is twinned with:

- Izbicko, Poland
