= Police forces of Nazi Germany =

The police forces of Nazi Germany were nationalized in 1936, and put under the Reichsführer-SS, Heinrich Himmler as Chief of the German Police.

== Organization ==
There were two major police forces under Himmler's command:

- Ordnungspolizei (Orpo; order police) consisting of the regular uniformed police
  - Gemeindepolizei (GemPo; municipal protection police)
  - Schutzpolizei (SchuPo; state protection police)
- Sicherheitspolizei (SiPo; security police) consisting of two sub-departments
  - Geheime Staatspolizei (Gestapo; secret state police)
  - Kriminalpolizei (Kripo; criminal police)

In September 1939, the SiPo and the Sicherheitsdienst (SD; security service) were folded into the Reichssicherheitshauptamt (RSHA; Reich Security Main Office), when they were made separate departments. The RSHA was under the overall command of Reinhard Heydrich.

== Leadership and control ==
The leadership of the German police was formally vested in the Minister of the Interior, Wilhelm Frick from January 1933, who along with Hermann Göring exercised executive power over Germany's police organs; this was an important part of Adolf Hitler's effort to increase his administrative grip over the nation.

On 17 June 1936, Hitler appointed Himmler chief of the German police, which resulted in a "unified concentration of the entire police apparatus...and the administrative concentration of the police forces of the entire Reich." This action effectively merged the police into the Schutzstaffel (SS). Although Himmler remained nominally answerable to then Interior Minister Frick, he was in reality the de facto chief, being only answerable to Hitler in the Nazi hierarchy. As Germany's most senior policeman, Himmler had two goals; first the official goal of centralization and Gleichschaltung: reforming the German police forces after Nazi Party ideals; secondly, the unofficial goal of making the German police an adjunct of the SS, thereby increasing his power base and improving his standing among Hitler's leadership assemblage.

By August 1936, the Gestapo was standardized across the Reich, wherein all political police—of which there were seventeen different organs—were merged. Command and control of the Ordnungspolizei (Orpo) was exerted through Hauptamt Ordnungspolizei, founded in 1936, under the successive leadership of Kurt Daluege (1936–1943), who was later replaced by Alfred Wünnenberg (1943–1945). Command and control of the Gestapo and the Kripo were since 1936 exerted through Hauptamt Sicherheitspolizei, and from 1939 through the Reichssicherheitshauptamt (RSHA). These organizations along with the Sicherheitsdienst (SD), became departments of the RSHA—initially under Heydrich (1936–1942) and then Ernst Kaltenbrunner (1943–1945) until World War II's end in Europe.

== Bibliography ==
- Blood, Philip W. (2006). Hitler's Bandit Hunters: The SS and the Nazi Occupation of Europe. Potomac Books. ISBN 978-1-59797-021-1.
- Browder, George C. (1990). Foundations of the Nazi Police State: The Formation of Sipo and SD. Lexington: University Press of Kentucky. ISBN 978-0-81318-273-5.
- Browder, George C (1996). Hitler's Enforcers: The Gestapo and the SS Security Service in the Nazi Revolution. Oxford and New York: Oxford University Press. ISBN 978-0-19820-297-4.
- Broszat, Martin (1996). The Hitler State: The Foundation and Development of the Internal Structure of the Third Reich. London and New York: Routledge. ISBN 978-0-58248-997-4.
- Dams, Carsten; Stolle, Michael (2014). The Gestapo: Power and Terror in the Third Reich. Oxford and New York: Oxford University Press. ISBN 978-0-19966-921-9.
- Gerwarth, Robert (2011). Hitler's Hangman: The Life of Heydrich. New Haven, CT: Yale University Press. ISBN 978-0-300-11575-8.
- Westermann, Edward B. (2005). Hitler's Police Battalions: Enforcing Racial War in the East. Lawrence, KS: University Press of Kansas. ISBN 978-0-7006-1724-1.
- Zentner, Christian; Bedürftig, Friedemann (1991). The Encyclopedia of the Third Reich. New York: MacMillan Publishing. ISBN 0-02-897500-6.
