= Bernhard Wehner =

German criminal inspector, Schutzstaffel (SS) officer, and journalist (1909–1995)

Bernhard Wehner (15 December 1909 – 31 December 1995) was a German criminal inspector, Schutzstaffel (SS) officer, and journalist. During the postwar period, he was a criminologist and writer for the news magazine Der Spiegel.

== Biography ==
After graduating with a law degree, he joined the Nazi Party in 1931 and the SS in 1940. In 1942, he was promoted to the rank of SS-Hauptsturmführer (captain). Wehner worked under Arthur Nebe, chief of the Kripo, which after 27 September 1939 was Department V of the RSHA. Department V was also known as the Reichskriminalpolizeiamt (Reich Criminal Police Department or RKPA).

In 1942, Wehner led sub-department BI a2 within RSHA Department V (RKPA), to combat capital crimes. That same year, he published a book as to the alleged "criminal investigation results" of thousands of "Polish atrocities" against "ethnic Germans"; stating that Poland was responsible for the September 1939 German invasion and occupation of the country. He also took part in the investigation of the death of Reinhard Heydrich in 1942.

After the assassination attempt against Adolf Hitler on 20 July 1944, Wehner was flown with three other Berlin criminologists to the Wolf's Lair. Together with Albert Widmann and Horst Kopkow, he reconstructed the events. He reported the conclusions of the investigation to Hitler. Wehner later organized the search for Arthur Nebe, who was wanted as a co-conspirator. After the war ended in 1945, Wehner was interned. After he was released in early April 1946, he worked for a time as a driver at the British military authorities in Bad Harzburg. Wehner went on to work as a criminologist and writer for Der Spiegel news magazine. He tried to diminish the crimes of the criminal police and its relationship with the Sicherheitsdienst (SD) and Gestapo during the Nazi era. According to author Benjamin Carter Hett, Wehner and Walter Zirpins were the "two most important post-war promoters of a sanitized version of the history of the German criminal police" in the 1950s. In 1954, Wehner became head of the criminal police department in Düsseldorf and remained there until 1970. He also served as editor and writer of the professional journal, "Criminology".
