= Kriminalpolizei (Nazi Germany) =

Criminal police of Nazi Germany

Kripo
- Kriminalpolizei

Agency overview
- Superseding agency: Landespolizei
- Type: Criminal police
- Jurisdiction: Germany; Occupied Europe
- Headquarters: RSHA, Prinz-Albrecht-Straße, Berlin; 52°30′26″N 13°22′57″E
- Employees: 12,792 c. February 1944
- Minister responsible: Heinrich Himmler 1934–1939, Reichsführer-SS und Chef der Deutschen Polizei
- Agency executives: Arthur Nebe July 1936–1944, Chief of the Kriminalpolizei; Friedrich Panzinger 1944–1945, Chief of the Kriminalpolizei
- Parent agency: Sicherheitspolizei (SiPo); Reich Security Main Office (RSHA)

The Kriminalpolizei (lit. 'criminal police'), (Note: In present-day Germany, the term designates the criminal investigation branches of the individual states' police forces (Landespolizei); there is no Kripo at the federal level, where the Bundeskriminalamt performs a separate function.) often abbreviated as Kripo, was a police force of Nazi Germany. The Kripo consisted of the Reich Criminal Police Department (RKPA), which in 1939 became Department V of the Reich Security Main Office (RSHA). There were criminal investigation centers directly subordinated to RKPA as well as criminal investigation divisions of the local state and municipal police departments. In 1943 both the latter became directly subordinated to the criminal investigation centers. The personnel consisted of detectives in the junior, executive, and female careers, as well as criminal investigation employees.

== Organisation ==
After Adolf Hitler took office in January 1933, the Nazis began a programme of "coordination" of all aspects of German life, in order to consolidate the Nazi Party's hold on power. In July 1936, the Prussian central criminal investigation department (Landeskriminalpolizeiamt) became the central criminal investigation department for Germany, the Reichskriminalpolizeiamt (RKPA). It was combined, along with the secret state police, the Geheime Staatspolizei or Gestapo into two sub-branch departments of the Sicherheitspolizei (SiPo), which had a central command office known as the Hauptamt Sicherheitspolizei. Reinhard Heydrich was in overall command of the SiPo, including its central command office. Arthur Nebe was appointed head of the Reichskriminalpolizeiamt, and reported directly to Heydrich.

In September 1939, the Reichssicherheitshauptamt (Reich Security Main Office; RSHA) was created as the overarching command organisation for the various state investigation and security agencies. The Hauptamt Sicherheitspolizei was officially abolished and its departments were folded into the Reich Security Main Office. The Reichskriminalpolizeiamt became Amt V (Department 5), the Kriminalpolizei (Criminal Police) in the RSHA. It was commanded by Nebe until the summer of 1944, when he was denounced and executed subsequent to the failed 20 July plot to kill Hitler. In the last year of its existence, Amt V was commanded by Friedrich Panzinger who answered directly to Ernst Kaltenbrunner, the head of the RSHA after Heydrich's assassination in 1942.

The Kriminalpolizei mostly consisted of plainclothes detectives and agents, and worked in conjunction with the Gestapo, the Ordnungspolizei (Orpo; uniformed police) and the Geheime Feldpolizei. The policy directives came from the SS-Hauptamt (SS Main Office) and after 1940, the SS Führungshauptamt (SS Leadership Main Office). The Kripo was organised in a hierarchical system, with central offices in all towns and smaller cities. These, in turn, answered to headquarters offices in the larger German cities which answered to Amt V in Berlin.

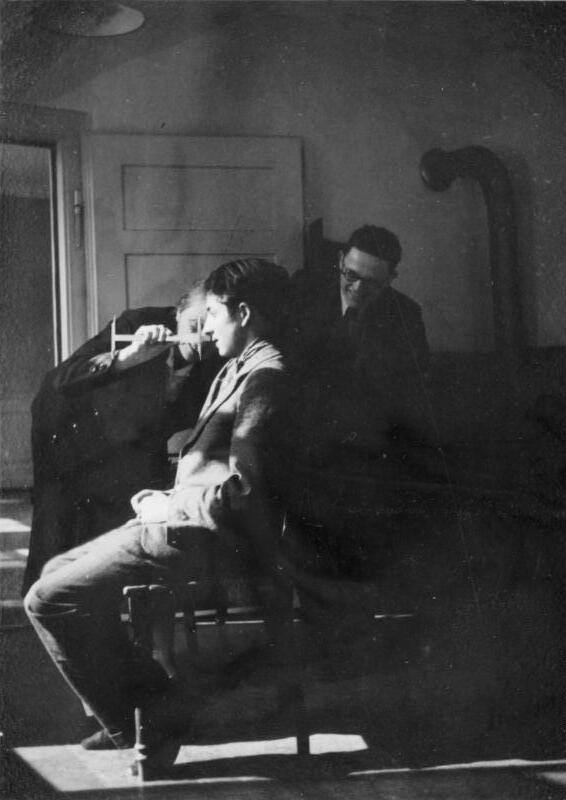
Kripo researchers measure a Sinti boy's head in anthropological studies of criminals, Stuttgart in 1938

The Kriminalpolizei was mainly concerned with serious crimes such as rape, murder and arson. A main area of the group's focus was also on "blackout burglary," considered a serious problem during bombing raids when criminals would raid abandoned homes, shops and factories for any available valuables. The Kripo was one of the sources of manpower used to fill the ranks of the Einsatzgruppen when the units were re-formed prior to the invasion of the Soviet Union in 1941. Several senior Kripo commanders, Arthur Nebe among them, were assigned as Einsatzgruppen commanders. The Einsatzgruppen mobile death squad units perpetrated atrocities in the occupied Soviet Union, including mass murder of Jews, communists, prisoners of war, and hostages, and played a key role in the Holocaust.

As part of the Nazi doctrines on crime and race, the Rassenhygienische und Bevölkerungsbiologische Forschungsstelle (English: Racial Hygiene and Demographic Biology Research Unit) headed by psychiatrist and medical doctor Robert Ritter, was attached to the Kripo. Its role was to create racial profiles of non-Aryans, in particular, Roma. Both the Gestapo and the Kripo deferred their policies and guidelines to the criminal biology department on how to deal with "Gypsies". The Kripo aided in the round ups of Roma and their deportations to concentration camps and extermination camps.

=== Mission ===
The official mission of Amt V was to:

- Standardize criminological methods and equipment
- Apply scientific research and experience in the investigation and prevention of crime
- Conduct criminological training
- Provide data for policy decisions and legislation
- Nationalize police surveillance
- Maintain a national criminal register
- Investigate severe crimes

=== Activities ===
In 1945 Amt V had the following bureaus:

Bureau	Responsibility	Tasks
V A	Criminal policy and preventions	Legal affairs, international cooperation, research, crime prevention, female detectives
V B	Operations	Serious violent crimes, fraud, sexual crimes
V C	Registration and surveillance	War surveillance, surveillance technology, canine service
V D	Forensics	Identification, chemical and biological laboratory examinations, document studies, technical workshops
V Wi	Economic crimes	Crimes against the war economy, war profiteering, corruption, business crimes

=== Leadership ===
No.	Portrait	Chief	Took office	Left office	Time in office	Party
1	Arthur Nebe	SS-Gruppenführer; Arthur Nebe (1894–1945)	29 September 1939	20 July 1944	4 years, 295 days	NSDAP
2	Friedrich Panzinger	SS-Oberführer; Friedrich Panzinger (1903–1959)	21 July 1944	2 May 1945	285 days	NSDAP

== Field organization ==
=== 1939–1943 period ===
Level	Agency	Organizational subordination
Regional	Kriminalpolizei-Leitstelle criminal investigation department control center	Amt V
Regional	Kriminalpolizei-Stelle criminal investigation department center	Amt V
Local	Staatliche Kriminalabteilung state criminal investigation division	State Police Commissioner
Local	Gemeindekriminalpolizeiabteilung municipal criminal investigation division	Municipal Police Commissioner

Towns with over 10,000 residents having a municipal police department were obliged to have a municipal criminal investigation division (Gemeindekriminalpolizeiabteilung). It was supervised by the nearest Kripo-Stelle.

=== 1943–1945 period ===
From 1943 all municipal criminal investigation divisions with over ten detectives, i.e. mainly in towns with over 50,000 inhabitants, were transferred to the state criminal police. Local state criminal investigations divisions were henceforth not subordinated to the local state police commissioner.

Level	Agency	Organizational subordination
Regional	Kriminalpolizei-Leitstelle criminal investigation department control center	Amt V
Regional	Kriminalpolizei-Stelle criminal investigation department center	Amt V
Local	Kriminalpolizei-Aussendiensstelle criminal investigation department field office	nearest Kripo-Leitstelle or Kripo-Stelle
Local	Kriminalpolizei-Aussenposten criminal investigation department outposts	nearest Kripo-Leitstelle, Kripo-Stelle or Kripo-Aussendienststelle

In 1944 there were 22 Kripo-Leitstellen with 150-250 detectives under an Oberregierungs- und Kriminalrat; 44 Kripo-Stellen with 80-120 detectives under a Regierungs- und Kriminalrat or Kriminaldirektor; and 698 Kripo-Aussendienstellen and Kripo-Aussenpost, of which the latter per definition had less than ten detectives.

== Personnel ==
There were two separate criminal investigation officer careers: the junior criminal investigation career (einfacher Vollzugsdienst) and the executive criminal investigation career (leitender Vollzugsdienst). There were also a female criminal investigation career (weibliche Kriminalpolizei). In addition there were criminal investigation employees, who were salaried public employees but not civil servants.

=== Employment and training ===
==== Junior criminal investigation career ====
A detective trainee had to be a policeman in the Ordnungspolizei or a soldier in the Waffen-SS with the rank of SS-Unterscharführer or above, having served at least 4 ½ years, and not be older than 24 years. The Kriminalassistentanwärter (detective trainee) began his training as an intern for 12 months, followed by a 12 months course at the Kriminalfachschule (Criminal investigation college) in Berlin-Charlottenburg. After the college came a 12 months period as probationary detective (Kriminalassistent aus Probe). First employment was as apl. Kriminalassistent (supernumerary detective) until a billet was free and he could be appointed to a permanent position as Kriminalassistent.

==== Executive criminal investigation career ====
Externally recruited senior detective trainees (Kriminalkommissaranwärter) must have taken the general university entrance exam (Abitur) and been selected through a special selection procedure (Ausleselager). Internally recruited senior detective trainees came from the lower ranks of the Ordnungspolizei or from the junior criminal investigation career. They were selected through a civil service exam. The training began with a 12 months internship, followed by a 9 months course at the Führerschule der Sicherheitspolizei in Berlin-Charlottenburg. The trainee was then promoted to Hilfskriminalkommissar; normally he was within a few days given a six months probationary appointment as Kriminalkommissar auf Probe, before being promoted to außerplanmäßigen Kriminalkommissar as a supernumerary.

==== Female criminal investigation career ====
According to regulations issued by the Reich Security Main Office in 1940, women that had been trained in social work or having a similar education could be hired as female detectives. Female youth leaders, lawyers, business administrators with experience in social work, female leaders in the Reichsarbeitsdienst and personnel administrators in the Bund Deutscher Mädel were hired as detectives after a one-year course if they had several years professional experience. Later also nurses, kindergarten teachers and trained female commercial employees with an aptitude for police work were hired as female detectives after a two-year course. After two years as Kriminaloberassistentin promotion to Kriminalsekretärin could take place, after another two or three years in that grade the female detective could be promoted to Kriminalobersekretärin. Further promotions to Kriminalkommissarin and Kriminalrätin was also possible.

==== Criminal investigation employees ====
Criminal Investigation Aids, from 1935 Criminal Investigation Employees, were salaried public employees but not civil servants. There were three kinds of Criminal Investigation Employees, Kriminalangesteller (A) in outer service, Kriminalangesteller (K) were drivers, Kriminalangesteller (F) were telex operators. The fact that Criminal Investigation Employees were not civil servants made it possible to recruit reliable members of the Nazi Party, irrespective of civil service regulations concerning employment requirements and regardless of budget plans. The only requirements that were made beyond the normal conditions for public employment in Nazi Germany was that the applicant were physically and mentally fit for police duties. Not all Criminal Investigation Employees were volunteers; members of the Nazi Party and the Allgemeine SS could, after the beginning of the war in 1939, be conscripted into criminal police service. During the German occupation of Denmark, Danish citizens would also be employed as Kriminalangestellter, but with the Gestapo.

=== Pay ===
Criminal Investigation Officers' Rank and Pay

Pay Grade	Annual Pay Reichsmark (RM)	Grade in the einfachen Vollzugsdienst	Grade in the leitenden Vollzugsdienst	Corresponding rank in the SS (Wehrmacht-Heer)
A8c2	2,160–2,340	Kriminalassistent		SS-Oberscharführer (Feldwebel)
A7c; A8a	2,000–3,000	Kriminaloberassistent		SS-Hauptscharführer (Oberfeldwebel)
A7a	2,350–3,500	Kriminalsekretär		SS-Untersturmführer (Leutnant)
A5b	2,300–4,200	Kriminalobersekretär		SS-Untersturmführer (Leutnant)
A4c2	2,800–5,000	Kriminalinspektor		SS-Obersturmführer (Oberleutnant)
A4c1	2,800–5,300		Kriminalkommissar	SS-Obersturmführer (Oberleutnant)
A4c1	2,800–5,300		Kriminalkommissar with more than three years in the grade	SS-Hauptsturmführer (Hauptmann)
A3b	4,800–7,000		Kriminalrat	SS-Hauptsturmführer (Hauptmann)
A3b	4,800–7,000		Kriminalrat with more than three years in the grade	SS-Sturmbannführer (Major)
A2d	4,800–7,800		Kriminaldirektor	SS-Sturmbannführer (Major)
A2c2	4,800–8,400		Regierungs- und Kriminalrat	SS-Sturmbannführer (Major)
A2b	7,000–9,700		Oberregierungs- und Kriminalrat	SS-Obersturmbannführer (Oberstleutnant)
A1b	6,200–10,600		Regierungs- und Kriminaldirektor	SS-Standartenführer (Oberst)
A1b	6,200–10,600		Reichskriminaldirektor	SS-Standartenführer (Oberst)

Mean annual pay for an industrial worker was 1,459 Reichsmark in 1939, and for a privately employed white-collar worker 2,772 Reichsmark.

Criminal Investigation Employees' Pay

The Criminal Investigation Employees were not paid according to the Civil Service pay scale, but in accordance with the salary scale for public employees. They were later paid according to a special pay scale (see below):

Pay Grade	Annual pay (Reichsmark)	Equivalent Rank Level
1	6,000	Hauptsturmführer
2	5,400	Hauptsturmführer
3	4,800	Obersturmführer
4	4,500	Obersturmführer
5	4,200	Obersturmführer
6	3,900	Obersturmführer
7	3,600	Untersturmführer
8	3,300	Untersturmführer
9	3,000	Sturmscharführer; Hauptscharführer
10	2,700	Sturmscharführer; Hauptscharführer
11	2,520	Sturmscharführer; Hauptscharführer
12	2,250	Oberscharführer
13	2,000	Scharführer

=== Rank insignia ===
Male personnel

Criminal Investigation Officers	Rank insignia	Criminal Investigation Employees
n/a		SS-Scharführer
Kriminalassistent		SS-Oberscharführer
Kriminaloberassistent		SS-Hauptscharführer
Kriminalsekretär		SS-Untersturmführer
Kriminalobersekretär		SS-Untersturmführer
Kriminalinspektor		SS-Obersturmführer
Kriminalkommissar		SS-Obersturmführer
Kriminalkommissar with more than three years in the grade		SS-Hauptsturmführer
Kriminalrat		SS-Hauptsturmführer
Kriminalrat with more than three years in the grade		n/a
Kriminaldirektor		n/a
Regierungs- und Kriminalrat		n/a
Oberregierungs- und Kriminalrat		n/a
Regierungs- und Kriminaldirektor; Reichskriminaldirektor		n/a
Regierungs- und Kriminaldirektor; Reichskriminaldirektor		n/a
