= Arthur Nebe =

German SS functionary and Holocaust perpetrator (1894–1945)

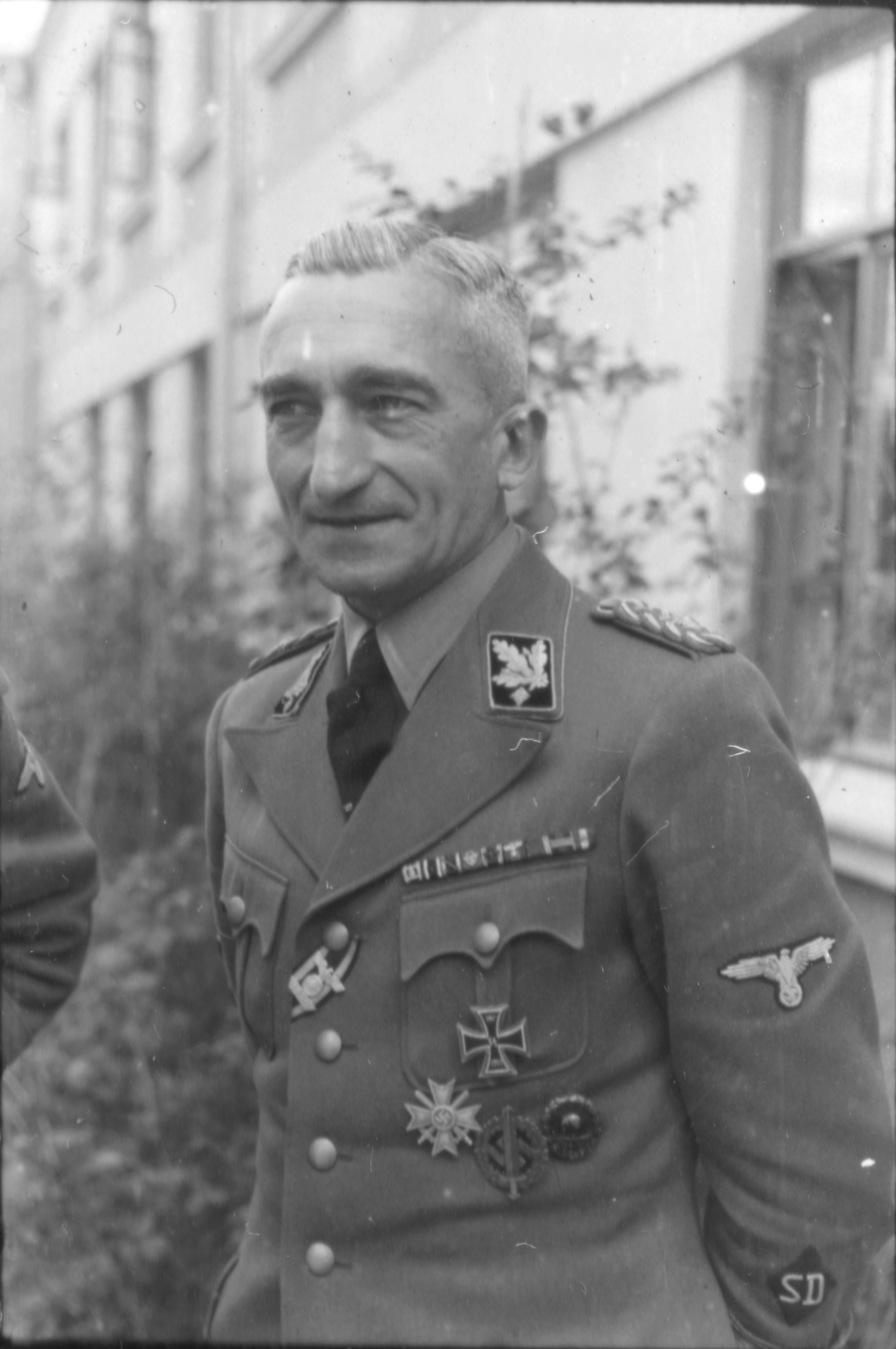
- Nebe in 1942
- Born: 13 November 1894; Berlin, Germany
- Died: 21 March 1945 (aged 50); Plötzensee Prison, Berlin, Germany
- Cause of death: Execution by hanging
- Motive: Nazism

Details
- Victims: 45,000+
- Span of crimes: 1941–1944
- Country: Belarus and Germany
- SS career
- Allegiance: German Empire; Nazi Germany
- Branch: Imperial German Army; Schutzstaffel
- Service years: 1914–1918; 1931–1944
- Rank: SS-Gruppenführer
- Units: Kriminalpolizei
- Commands: Reich Criminal Police; Einsatzgruppe B; ICPC
- Conflicts: World War I
- Awards: Iron Cross, first class; War Merit Cross, 1st and 2nd class with Swords

Arthur Nebe (German: [ˈaʁtuːɐ̯ ˈneːbə]; 13 November 1894 – 21 March 1945) was a German SS functionary who held key positions in the security and police apparatus of Nazi Germany and was, from 1941, a major perpetrator of the Holocaust.

Nebe rose through the ranks of the Prussian police force to become head of Nazi Germany's Criminal Police (Kriminalpolizei; Kripo) in 1936, which was amalgamated into the Reich Security Main Office (RSHA) in 1939. Before the 1941 German invasion of the Soviet Union, Nebe volunteered to serve as the commanding officer of Einsatzgruppe B, one of the four mobile death squads of the SS. The unit was deployed in the Army Group Centre Rear Area, in modern-day Belarus; it reported over 45,000 victims by November 1941. In late 1941, Nebe was posted back to Berlin and resumed his career with the RSHA. Nebe commanded the Kripo until he was denounced and executed following the unsuccessful attempt to kill Adolf Hitler in July 1944.

Following the war, Nebe's career and involvement with the 20 July plot against Hitler were the subject of several apologetic accounts by surviving members of the plot, who portrayed him as a professional policeman and a dedicated anti-Nazi. These portrayals have since been discredited by historians who describe him as an opportunist and a mass murderer driven by racism and careerism.

== Before World War II ==
=== Police career ===
Born in Berlin in 1894, the son of a school teacher, Nebe volunteered for military service during World War I and served with distinction. In 1920, he joined the Berlin detective force, the Kriminalpolizei (Kripo; Criminal Police). He attained the rank of police inspector in 1923 and police commissioner in 1924.

Nebe was a conservative nationalist, who embraced the shift of the country to right-wing rule in the 1930s. In July 1931, he joined the Nazi Party (party number 574,307) and the SS (SS number 280,152). Nebe became the Nazis' liaison in the criminal police in Berlin, with links to an early Berlin SS group led by Kurt Daluege. In early 1932, Nebe and other Nazi detectives formed the NS (National Socialist) Civil Service Society of the Berlin Police. In 1933, he came to know Hans Bernd Gisevius, then an official in the Berlin Police Headquarters; after the war, Gisevius produced an apologetic account of Nebe's Nazi era activities. In 1935, Nebe was appointed head of the Prussian Criminal Police. He obtained the rank of SS-Gruppenführer and Generalleutnant of Police on 9 November 1941.

=== Head of National Criminal Police ===
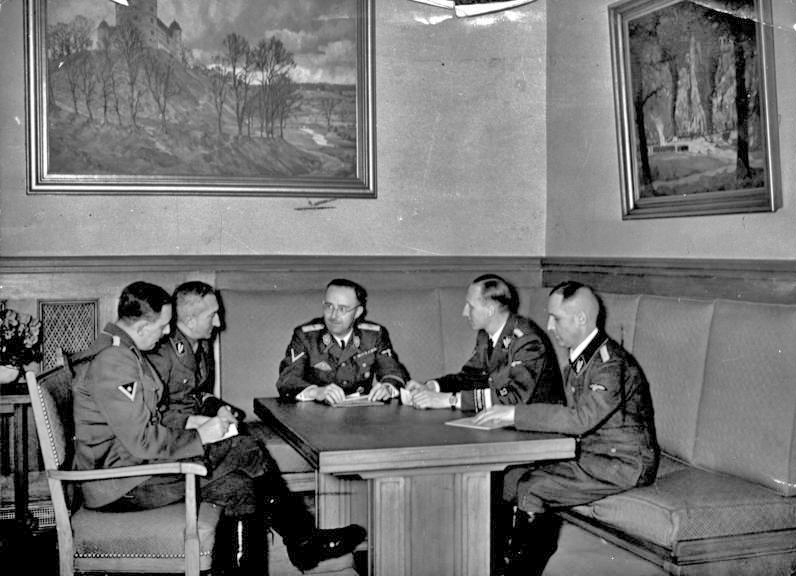
From left to right: Franz Josef Huber, Nebe, Heinrich Himmler, Reinhard Heydrich and Heinrich Müller, November 1939 in Munich.

In July 1936, the Prussian Criminal Police became the central criminal investigation department for Germany, the Reichskriminalpolizeiamt (Reich Criminal Police Office or RKPA). It was amalgamated, along with the secret state police, the Geheime Staatspolizei (Gestapo), into the Sicherheitspolizei (SiPo), with Reinhard Heydrich in overall command. Nebe was appointed head of the RKPA, reporting to Heydrich. The addition of the Kripo to Heydrich's control helped cement the foundations of the Nazi police state. It also led to an "overlap" of personnel from the SD, Gestapo and Kripo in leadership positions in the police and security forces in Germany.

On 27 September 1939, Himmler ordered the creation of the Reich Security Main Office (Reichssicherheitshauptamt or RSHA); the new organisation encompassed the intelligence service, security services, secret state and criminal police. The RSHA was divided into several main departments, including the Kripo, which became Department V of the RSHA. Kripo's stated mission, which Nebe embraced, was to "exterminate criminality". Under his leadership, equipped with arbitrary powers of arrest and detention, the Kripo acted more and more like the Gestapo, including the liberal use of so-called protective custody and large-scale roundups of "asocials".

In 1939, Nebe lent a commissioner of his Criminal Police Office, Christian Wirth of Stuttgart, to the Action T4, which ran the programme of involuntary euthanasia (murder) of the disabled. Also in 1939, as head of Kripo, he was involved in the discussions of the upcoming campaigns against the Sinti and Roma. Nebe wanted to include sending Berlin's "Gypsies" to the planned reservations for the Jews and others in the east. In October 1939, he ordered Adolf Eichmann to put Sinti and Roma with Jews on the transports to occupied Poland under the "Nisko Plan". In November, Nebe interrogated Georg Elser after Elser's failed assassination attempt on Hitler, concluding that Elser was telling the truth when he claimed that he was working alone.

== World War II ==
=== Einsatzgruppe B ===
Just before the 1941 Nazi invasion of the Soviet Union in Operation Barbarossa, the Einsatzgruppen mobile death squads, which had previously operated in Poland, were reformed and placed once again under the overall command of Reinhard Heydrich. Nebe volunteered to command Einsatzgruppe B, an SS death squad that operated in the Army Group Center Rear Area as the invasion progressed. The unit's task was to exterminate Jews and other "undesirables", such as communists, "Gypsies", "Asiatics", the disabled, and psychiatric hospital patients in the territories that the Wehrmacht had overrun. The Einsatzgruppe also shot hostages and prisoners of war handed over by the army for execution.

==== Mass killing operations ====
Around 5 July 1941, Nebe consolidated Einsatzgruppe B near Minsk, establishing a headquarters and remaining there for two months. The murders progressed apace. In a 13 July Operational Situation Report, Nebe stated that 1,050 Jews had been killed in Minsk, also noting that the liquidation of the Jews was underway in Vilna where 500 Jews were shot daily. In the same report, Nebe remarked: "only 96 Jews were executed in Grodno and Lida during the first days. I gave orders to intensify these activities". He reported that the killings were being brought into smooth running order and that the shootings were carried out "at an increasing rate". The report also announced that his Einsatzgruppe was now killing non-Jews in Minsk.

In the 23 July report, Nebe advanced the idea of a "solution to the Jewish problem" being "impractical" in his assigned area of operation due to "the overwhelming number of the Jews"; i.e. there were too many Jews to be killed by too few men. By August 1941, Nebe came to realize that his Einsatzgruppe's resources were insufficient to meet the expanded mandate of the killing operations, resulting from the inclusion of Jewish women and children since that month.

==== New killing methods ====
In August 1941, Himmler, after a visit to Minsk, decided that alternative methods of killing should be found, instead of mass-shootings. He told Heydrich that he was concerned about the SS men's mental health. Himmler turned to Nebe to devise a more "convenient" method of killing, particularly one that would spare executioners elements of their grisly task. Murder with carbon monoxide gas, already in use in the Reich as part of the "euthanasia" program, was contemplated, but deemed too cumbersome for the mobile killing operations in the occupied Soviet Union.

Nebe decided to try experimenting by murdering Soviet psychiatric patients, first with explosives near Minsk, and then with automobile exhaust at Mogilev. The idea of using gas was partly inspired by an incident in Nebe's past. One night after a party, Nebe had driven home drunk, parked in his garage, and fallen asleep with the engine running, nearly dying of carbon monoxide poisoning from the exhaust fumes. To conduct the experiments, he ordered the SS chemist Albert Widmann, a member of the criminal-technical institute of the RKPA, to come to Minsk with 250 kilograms (550 lb) of explosives and exhaust hoses. The next day, Widmann, Nebe, and an explosives expert carried out their first experiment in prepared bunkers in the Minsk area. According to testimony presented at Widmann's postwar trial:

One of the bunkers was loaded with explosives and 24 mental patients were put into it. Nebe gave the signal to detonate, but the resultant explosion failed to kill the patients. Several of them emerged from the bunker covered in blood and screaming loudly. Thereupon more explosives were brought up, the wounded patients were forced back into the bunker, and a second explosion finally finished the job. The bunker had become quiet and parts of bodies could be seen hanging from nearby trees.

Two days later, Nebe and Widmann carried out another killing experiment: five psychiatric patients from Mogilev were placed in a hermetically sealed room with pipes leading to the outside. At first, exhausts from a passenger vehicle were vented into the room, so that the carbon monoxide would kill those inside. This method failed to kill the patients, so a truck was added; the patients were dead within 15 minutes. Nebe and Widmann concluded that killing with explosives was impractical, while gassing "held promise", as vehicles were readily available and could be used as needed.

After these experimental killings, Nebe thought of remodelling a vehicle with a hermetically sealed cabin for killing. The carbon monoxide from the vehicle's exhaust would be channelled into the sealed cabin in which the victims stood. He discussed the idea's technical aspects with a specialist from Kripo's Technology Institute and together they brought the proposal to Heydrich, who approved it.

==== Mogilev conference and escalation of violence ====
The Wehrmacht's aggressive rear security doctrine and the use of the "security threat" to disguise genocidal policies resulted in a close cooperation between the army and the security apparatus behind the front lines. Nebe, as the Einsatzgruppe B commander, participated in a three-day field conference at Mogilev in late September 1941. Organised by General Max von Schenckendorff, chief of Army Group Centre's rear area, the conference was to serve as an "exchange of experiences" for the Wehrmacht rear unit commanders.

Participating officers were selected on the basis of their "achievements and experiences" in security operations already undertaken. In addition to Nebe, the speakers included Higher SS and Police Leader Erich von dem Bach-Zelewski; Max Montua, commander of Police Regiment Centre; Hermann Fegelein, commander of the SS Cavalry Brigade; and Gustav Lombard, commander of the 1st SS Cavalry Regiment in Fegelein's brigade. Nebe's talk focused on the SD's role in the common fight against "partisans" and "plunderers". He also covered the "Jewish question" and its connection to the suppression of resistance movements in occupied territories. After the conference, a 16-page executive summary was distributed to the Wehrmacht troops and Order Police battalions in the rear area. There was a dramatic increase in atrocities against Jews and other civilians in the last three months of 1941.

Under Nebe's command, Einsatzgruppe B committed public hangings to terrorise the local population. Nebe's report dated 9 October 1941 stated that, due to suspected partisan activity near Demidov, all male residents aged 15 to 55 were put in a camp to be screened. Seventeen people were identified as "partisans" and "Communists" and five were hanged in front of 400 local residents assembled to watch; the rest were shot. Through 14 November 1941, Einsatzgruppe B reported the killing of 45,467 people; thereafter, Nebe returned to Berlin and resumed his duties as head of the Kripo.

=== President of the ICPC and Stalag Luft III murders ===
Following the 1942 assassination of Heydrich, Nebe assumed the additional post of President of the International Criminal Police Commission (ICPC), the organization today known as Interpol, in June 1942. After the Anschluss in 1938, the organization had fallen under the control of Nazi Germany and was headed by Heydrich until his death. Nebe served in this capacity until January 1943, when he was replaced by Ernst Kaltenbrunner.

In March 1944, after the "Great Escape" from Stalag Luft III prisoner-of-war camp, Nebe was ordered by Heinrich Müller, Chief of the Gestapo, to select and kill 50 of the 73 recaptured prisoners in what became known as the "Stalag Luft III murders". Also in 1944, Nebe suggested that the Roma interned at Auschwitz would be good subjects for medical experiments at the Dachau concentration camp, after Himmler had asked Ernst-Robert Grawitz, a high-ranking SS physician, for advice.

=== 1944 plot against Adolf Hitler ===
Nebe was involved in the 20 July plot against Adolf Hitler; he was to lead a team of 12 policemen to kill Himmler, but the signal to act never reached him. Following the unsuccessful assassination attempt, Nebe fled and went into hiding. He was arrested in January 1945 after a former mistress betrayed him. Nebe was condemned to death by the People's Court on 2 March and, according to official records, was executed at Plötzensee Prison in Berlin on 21 March 1945 by being hanged from a meat hook, in accordance with Hitler's order that the bomb plotters were to be "hanged like cattle."

== Assessment ==
Historians have a negative view of Nebe and his motives, despite his participation in the 20 July plot. Robert Gellately writes that Nebe's views were virulently racist and antisemitic. Martin Kitchen casts Nebe as an opportunist, who saw the SS as the police force of the future, and as an "energetic and enthusiastic mass murderer, who seized every opportunity to undertake yet another massacre." Yet, according to Kitchen, he "was clearly unable to stand the strain and was posted back to Berlin."

Comprehensive reports filed by the Einsatzgruppen were analyzed by historian Ronald Headland in his 1992 book Messages of Murder. These documents provide insights into its leadership's worldview. Headland writes that the reports "bear witness to the fanatic commitment of the Einsatzgruppen leaders to their mission of extermination"; their ideology and racism are evident in the "constant debasement of the victims" and "ever present racial conceptions concerning Jews, Communists, Gypsies and other 'inferior' elements". Headland concludes that Nebe was an ambitious man who may have volunteered to lead an Einsatzgruppen unit for careerist reasons, to curry favor with Heydrich. Any misgivings he may have entertained as to the feasibility of the undertaking failed to prevent him from overseeing the murder of close to 50,000 people in the five months Nebe commanded his unit.

Gerald Reitlinger describes Nebe's reasons for joining the Einsatzgruppen as "placation" and a desire to hold on to his position in the Criminal Police Department, where, since 1934, Gestapo men were gaining influence, and which was later taken over by Heydrich. Reitlinger writes: "If Nebe did in fact retain his office till 1944, it was because of the five months he spent in Russia, or, as his friend Gisevius politely referred to, 'at the front'." Reitlinger calls Nebe a "very questionable member" of the German military resistance at the time of the 20 July bomb plot.

Alex J. Kay writes that "the role, character and motivation of those involved both in planning—and in some cases carrying out—mass murder and in the conspiracy against Hitler deserve to be investigated more closely". He places Nebe in this category, with Franz Halder, chief of staff of the Army High Command (OKH), and Georg Thomas, head of the Defence, Economy and Armament Office in the Armed Forces High Command (OKW).

=== Apologetics ===
Several apologetic accounts produced by the conspirators behind the 20 July plot described Nebe as a professional police officer and a dedicated member of the German resistance. In 1947, Hans Bernd Gisevius described Nebe's position at the head of Einsatzgruppe B as a "brief command at the front"; Gisevius changed his story in the 1960s, when Nebe's role with the Einsatzgruppen was exposed. In the 1966 work Wo ist Nebe? ("Where is Nebe?"), Gisevius claimed that Nebe was reluctant to accept the posting, but had been persuaded to take it by the opposition leaders Hans Oster and Ludwig Beck, who had allegedly wanted Nebe to retain a key role in Heydrich's apparatus. Gisevius also claimed that Nebe exaggerated the number of victims in reports to Berlin by adding a zero to the number of those killed. A Swedish police official active in the ICPC during the war years, Harry Söderman, described Nebe and Karl Zindel, a key RSHA figure responsible for persecution of the Roma, in his 1956 book as "professional policemen.... very mild Nazis".

The historian Christian Gerlach, writing about the 20 July conspirators and their complicity in war crimes of the Wehrmacht, calls Nebe a "notorious mass murderer". He discusses the role of Henning von Tresckow and his adjutant, Fabian von Schlabrendorff, who were members of the military opposition to Hitler, and writes:

Schlabrendorff claimed that he and Tresckow had convinced themselves that "under the mask of the SS leader lurked a committed anti-Nazi.... who invented pretexts for sabotaging Hitler's murderous orders. We succeeded in saving the lives of many Russians. The Russian population often expressed their thanks to us". [....] According to Schlabrendorff, Tresckow personally brought Nebe to the army group [of conspirators]. Nothing was said about the 45,467 murder victims of Einsatzgruppe B by November 1941, the point at which Nebe returned to Berlin.

Gerlach doubts that Nebe falsified Einsatzgruppe B reports and puts Schlabrendorff's claims in the context of bomb plotters' memoirs and the then-prevalent assessments of the opposition group within the high command of Army Group Center: "Especially with reference to the murder of the Jews, [it is said that] 'the SS' had deceived the officers by killing in secret, filing incomplete reports or none at all; if general staff officers protested, the SS threatened them." Gerlach concludes: "This is, of course, nonsense."

The historian Waitman Wade Beorn writes that "some have argued that [Nebe] deliberately inflated the numbers of Jews he reported killed; yet all evidence indicates that he was quite content to play his role in Nazi genocide and that his subsequent displeasure with the regime may have stemmed from the imminent Nazi defeat, but not opposition to the Holocaust". Bernhard Wehner, Nebe's former colleague at the Kripo stated that "Nebe was worried the Allies would punish him for his crimes" - his only reason for joining the resistance.

Government offices
Preceded by himself, as Director of Reichskriminalpolizeiamt (RKPA)	Chief of Kriminalpolizei (Kripo); 1939–1944	Succeeded by Friedrich Panzinger
Preceded by Reinhard Heydrich	President of the ICPC; 1942–1943	Succeeded by Ernst Kaltenbrunner
