= Friedrich Panzinger =

German Nazi SS officer and Holocaust perpetrator (1903–1959)

- Born: 1 February 1903; Munich, German Empire
- Died: 8 August 1959 (aged 56); Munich, West Germany
- Military career
- Allegiance: Nazi Germany
- Branch: Sturmabteilung, Schutzstaffel and Sicherheitsdienst
- Service years: 1933–1945
- Rank: SS-Oberführer
- Commands: Einsatzgruppe A

Friedrich Panzinger (1 February 1903 – 8 August 1959) was a German Schutzstaffel (SS) officer during the Nazi era. He served as the head of the Reich Security Main Office (RSHA) Amt IV A, from September 1943 to May 1944 and the commanding officer of three sub-group Einsatzkommando of Einsatzgruppen A (mobile killing squads) in the Baltic States and Belarus. From 15 August 1944 forward, he was chief of RSHA Amt V, the Kriminalpolizei (Kripo; 'Criminal Police'). After the war, Panzinger was arrested in 1946 and imprisoned by the Soviet Union for being a war criminal. Released in 1955, he was a member of the Bundesnachrichtendienst (BND; transl. Federal Intelligence Service). In 1959, Panzinger committed suicide in his jail cell after being arrested for war crimes.

== Biography ==
Panzinger attended night school and began studying law. He took part in a recruitment test for the police and was admitted as a police officer in the civil service in the Munich Police Directorate in 1919. As a police officer in Bavaria, Panzinger worked with Franz Josef Huber, and Josef Meisinger, both future Schutzstaffel (SS) officials. He finally completed a law degree in 1932. In the summer of 1933 Panzinger joined the Sturmabteilung (SA). He joined the Nazi Party with the number 1,017,341.

In April 1937, Panzinger joined the SS with member number 322,118. He was then employed as a Kriminalkommissar ('Chief Inspector') in the state police headquarters in Berlin. On 29 June 1940 he began working in the Sicherheitspolizei (SiPo; 'Security Police') in Sofia, Bulgaria. In August 1940 he assumed the position of Secretary of Section IV A (Enemies) of the Gestapo, where his sub-office focused on communism, Marxism and enemy propaganda within Nazi Germany until 4 September 1943. Panzinger's office consisted of the following subdivisions:

- IV A 1 (Communism, Marxism and subsidiary organizations, war crimes, illegal and enemy propaganda)
- IV A 2 (Sabotage defense, counter-sabotage, political-police officer defense, political forgery)
- IV A 3 (Reactionaries, opposition, legitimism, liberalism, emigration, treacherous affairs and opposition)
- IV A 4 (Protection service, assassination attempts, monitoring, special order, investigation squad)

From 4 September 1943 to 6 May 1944, Panzinger succeeded Humbert Achamer-Pifrader as the commander of Einsatzgruppen A (a mobile killing squad), composed of three sub-group Einsatzkommando that oversaw the security police matters in the area of Army Group North in the Baltic states and Belorussia. Panzinger's unit carried out the murder of potential opponents and those deemed racially inferior. During this time, Panzinger was also the Befehlshaber der Sicherheitspolizei und des SD ('Commander of the Security Police and SD') in Riga. Panzinger was assigned to the headquarters of the SD and Gestapo in Ukraine.

A reorganization of Amt IV of the Reich Security Main Office (RSHA) in March 1944 led to a breakdown of territory divisions between Panzinger and Achamer-Pifrader. While Panzinger took over leadership of sub-office IV A, he also served under Achamer-Pifrader in sub-office IV B. Panzinger's group now stood as follows:

- IV A 1 (Opposition): Panzinger
- IV A 2 (Sabotage): Horst Kopkow
- IV A 3 (Abwehr): SS-Obersturmbannführer Walter Huppenkothen
- IV A 4 (Ideological opponents): SS-Obersturmbannführer Adolf Eichmann
- IV A 5 (Special cases): SS-Standartenführer and government director Rudolf Mildner
- IV A 6 (Index, files, protective custody): SS-Sturmbannführer, government and police superintendent Dr. Emil Berndorff

In July 1944, after the 20 July plot to kill Hitler, Panzinger was appointed Chief of the Headquarters of the Gestapo, reporting directly to SS-Gruppenführer Heinrich Müller. Shortly thereafter, Panzinger was appointed Chief of RSHA Amt V, the Kriminalpolizei (Kripo; Criminal Police), also known as the Reichskriminalpolizeiamt (RKPA). He held that position until the end of the war. He succeeded Arthur Nebe, who was denounced and executed subsequent to the failed July assassination attempt on Hitler. He collaborated directly with RSHA chief, Ernst Kaltenbrunner. Panzinger was responsible for the murder of prisoner of war French general Gustave Marie Maurice Mesny on 19 January 1945 near the village of Nossen.

=== Post-war arrest and suicide ===
After the war, Panzinger was arrested in 1946 and imprisoned by the Soviet Union for being a war criminal. In Moscow on 22 March 1952 he was twice sentenced to 25 years of forced labor. As a so-called Nichtamnestierter ('non-amnestied'), he was released in September 1955 and repatriated to then West Germany. He worked for a time on the staff of the Bundesnachrichtendienst ('Federal Intelligence Service'; BND) under Reinhard Gehlen. Later, in 1959, he was employed by a trust company. That same year, after charges were brought against him for the murder of Maurice Mesny, Panzinger committed suicide by poisoning himself in his cell on 8 August 1959.
