= Reichskriminalpolizeiamt =

Nazi Germany's central criminal investigation department (1936-1939)

Reichskriminalpolizeiamt (RKPA)
- Active: 1936–1939
- Country: Nazi Germany
- Type: Criminal investigation department
- Part of: Sicherheitspolizei (1936–1939)

Structure
- Subunits: 14 Kriminalpolizeileitstellen; 51 Kriminalpolizeistellen

Commanders
- Notable commanders: Reinhard Heydrich (overall SiPo command); Arthur Nebe (RKPA chief)

Reichskriminalpolizeiamt (RKPA), was Nazi Germany's central criminal investigation department, founded in 1936 after the Prussian central criminal investigation department (Landeskriminalpolizeiamt) became the national criminal investigation department for Germany. It was merged, along with the secret state police department, the Gestapo, as two sub-branch departments of the Sicherheitspolizei (SiPo). The SiPo was under Reinhard Heydrich's overall command. In September 1939, with the founding of the Reich Security Main Office (RSHA), the SiPo as a functioning state agency ceased to exist as a department and was merged into the RSHA.

== Organisation ==
The central organisation contained a national surveillance register and eleven centers for national crimes.

- Fraud
- Drugs
- Missing persons
- Pornography
- Trafficking
- International pickpockets
- Gambling
- "Romani people"
- Serious violent crimes
- Professional fraud
- Professional burglary

The regional and local organisations included:

- 14 Kriminalpolizeileitstellen (regional criminal investigation units).
- 51 Kriminalpolizeistellen (local criminal investigation units).

== Merger ==
In 1936, the RKPA was formed after the Prussian central criminal investigation department (Landeskriminalpolizeiamt) became the national criminal investigation department for Germany. The state police agencies in Germany were then statutorily divided into the Ordnungspolizei (uniformed police) and the Sicherheitspolizei (state security police; SiPo). The RKPA was merged, along with the secret state police, the Geheime Staatspolizei or Gestapo as two sub-branch departments of the SiPo. Reinhard Heydrich was placed in overall command of the SiPo and its central command office, the Hauptamt Sicherheitspolizei. He was already head of the Sicherheitsdienst (SD) and Gestapo. Arthur Nebe was appointed the Reichskriminaldirektor of the Reichskriminalpolizeiamt, and reported to Heydrich.

In September 1939, the Reich Security Main Office (RSHA) was created as the command organisation for the various state investigation and security agencies. The Hauptamt Sicherheitspolizei was officially abolished and its departments were folded into the RSHA. The Reichskriminalpolizeiamt became Amt V (Department V), the Kriminalpolizei (Criminal Police) in the RSHA. On 15 August 1944, Friedrich Panzinger took over as chief of Amt V in the RSHA until the end of the war in Europe.
