= Hauptamt Sicherheitspolizei =

Central command office for certain state police agencies in Nazi Germany until 1939

Prinz-Albrecht-Straße 8 (modern Niederkirchnerstraße) building in Berlin was the location of the Hauptamt Sicherheitspolizei

Hauptamt Sicherheitspolizei (Main Office of the Security Police) was a central state police agency command office in Nazi Germany entrusted with overseeing the Kriminalpolizei (Criminal Police; Kripo) and the Geheime Staatspolizei (Secret State Police; Gestapo) for the years 1936–1939.

== Foundation ==
On 17 June 1936 Adolf Hitler decreed the unification of all police forces in the Reich and named Heinrich Himmler as Chief of German Police. Himmler immediately reorganised the police into two groups: the Ordnungspolizei (Order Police; Orpo), consisting of both the national uniformed police and the municipal police, and the Sicherheitspolizei (Security Police; SiPo), consisting of the Kripo and Gestapo. Reinhard Heydrich was appointed chief of the SiPo and was already head of the party Sicherheitsdienst (Security Service; SD) and the Gestapo.

In 1936, the Hauptamt Sicherheitspolizei was founded by Himmler, in order to create a centralized command office under Nazi control of the German criminal investigation and secret state police organisations. Therefore, the central office of the national criminal police department, then known as the Reichskriminalpolizeiamt (RKPA), along with the central office of the Gestapo were integrated into the Hauptamt Sicherheitspolizei under Heydrich's overall command.

In September 1939, the Reichssicherheitshauptamt or Reich Security Main Office (RSHA) was created as the command organisation for the various state investigation and security agencies. The Hauptamt Sicherheitspolizei was officially abolished and its departments were folded into the RSHA. The Gestapo became Amt IV (Department IV) and the Reichskriminalpolizeiamt became Amt V (Department V), the Kriminalpolizei in the RSHA.

== Organisation ==
Hauptamt Sicherheitspolizei was organised as a central office with three branches.

- Hauptbüro (central office): Reinhard Heydrich; deputy: Siegfried Taubert
- Amt Verwaltung und Recht (administration and law branch) with nine groups: Werner Best
  - V.1 Law: Karl Zindel
  - V.2 Finances: Rudolf Siegert
  - V.3 Personnel I (Gestapo): Hans-Joachim Tesmer
  - V.4 Personnel II (Kripo): Johannes Thiele
  - V.5 Training: Johannes Thiele
  - V.6 Passports and identification cards: Johannes Krause
  - V.7 Interpol och border police: Dr Wetz
  - V.8 Wehrmacht och national defense: Heinz Jost
  - V.9 Technology: Walter Staudinger
- Amt Politische Polizei (political police branch) with two divisions and nine groups:
  - PP.IIA Communists and other marxists
  - PP.IIB Churches, sects, political refugees, Jews, and free masons
  - PP.IIC Reactionary opposition, Austria
  - PP.IID Protective custody, Nazi concentration camps
  - PP.IIE Economy, social policy, associations
  - PP.IIG Broadcasting surveillance
  - PP.IIH Party matters
  - PP.IIJ Interpol
  - PP.IIP Press
  - PP.IIS Homosexuality, abortions
  - PP.III Counter espionage
- Amt Kriminalpolizei (criminal investigation branch) with three divisions:
  - S-Kr.1: Johannes Krause
  - S-Kr.2: Karl Zindel
  - S-Kr.3: Johannes Thiele
