= Kriminalpolizei =

German criminal police organisation

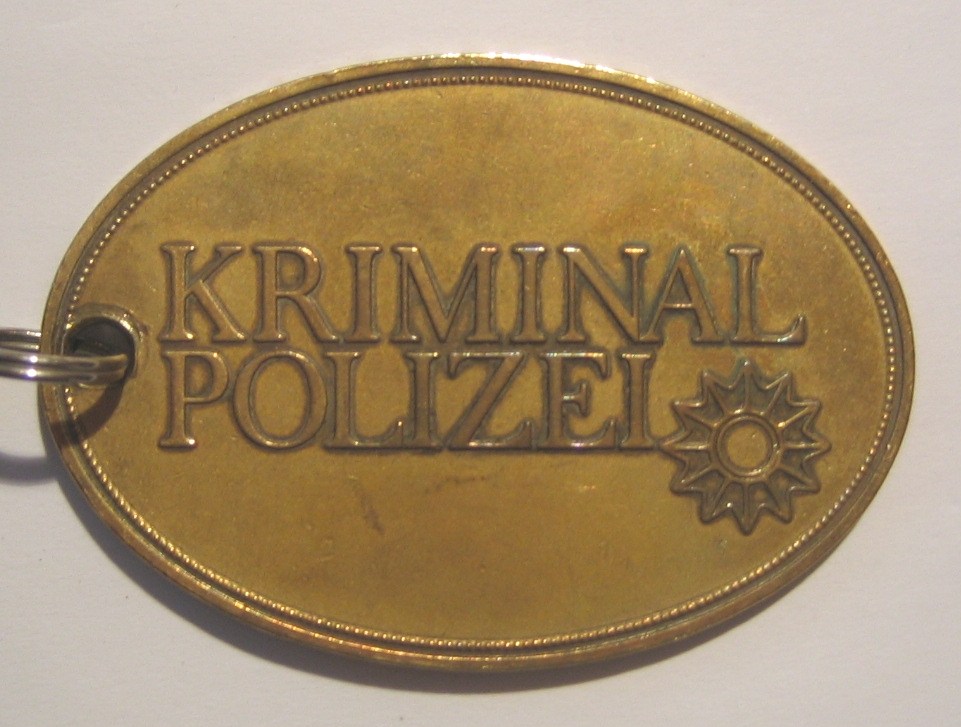
The badge of the Federal Criminal Police Office personnel

Kriminalpolizei (German pronunciation: [ˌkrɪmiˈnaːlpoliˌt͡saɪ̯], "criminal police") is the standard term for the criminal investigation agency within the police forces of Germany, Austria, and the German-speaking cantons of Switzerland. In Nazi Germany, the Kripo was the criminal police department for the entire Reich. Today, in the Federal Republic of Germany, the state police (Landespolizei) perform the majority of investigations. Its Criminal Investigation Department is known as the Kriminalpolizei or more colloquially, the Kripo.

== Foundation ==
In 1799, six police officers were assigned to the Prussian Kammergericht (superior court of justice) in Berlin to investigate more prominent crimes. They were given permission to work in plainclothes, when necessary. Their number increased in the following years.

In 1811, their rules of service were written into the Berliner Polizeireglement (Berlin Police Regulations), and in 1820, the rank of Kriminalkommissar was introduced for criminal investigators. In 1872, the new Kriminalpolizei was made a separate branch of police service distinguishing it from the uniformed police called Schutzpolizei.

Based on the experience with this new kind of police force, other German states—such as Bremen in 1852—reformed their police forces and by the end of the nineteenth century the Kriminalpolizei had been established nationwide. During the early part of the 20th century and post-World War I, the Kripo continued to serve as the German state's investigative agency for all criminal activity.

== Nazi Germany ==
After Adolf Hitler assumed national power in January 1933, the Kriminalpolizei came to be under the control of members of the Schutzstaffel (SS). The Nazis began a programme of "coordination" of all aspects of German life, in order to consolidate their hold on power. In July 1936, the Prussian central criminal investigation department (Landeskriminalpolizeiamt) became the central criminal investigation department for Germany, the Reichskriminalpolizeiamt. It was combined, along with the secret state police, the Geheime Staatspolizei (Gestapo) into two sub-branch departments of the Sicherheitspolizei (SiPo). Reinhard Heydrich was in overall command of the SiPo. Arthur Nebe was appointed head of the Reichskriminalpolizeiamt and reported to Heydrich.

In September 1939, the Reich Security Main Office (RSHA) was created as the overarching command organisation for the various state investigation and security agencies. The SiPo was officially abolished and its departments were folded into the RSHA. The Reichskriminalpolizeiamt became Amt V (Department 5), the Kriminalpolizei (Criminal Police) in the RSHA. Nebe was replaced as commander of the Kripo in August 1944 by Friedrich Panzinger.

The Kriminalpolizei were mostly plainclothes detectives and agents, and worked in conjunction with the Gestapo, the Ordnungspolizei (Orpo; uniformed police), and the Geheime Feldpolizei (secret military police). The Kripo was organised in a hierarchical system, with central offices in all towns and smaller cities. These, in turn, answered to headquarters offices in the larger German cities, which answered to Amt V of the RSHA in Berlin. The Kripo was mainly concerned with serious crimes such as rape, murder and arson. A main area of the group's focus was also on "blackout burglary," considered a serious problem during bombing raids when criminals would raid abandoned homes, shops and factories for valuables. The Kripo was one of the sources of manpower used to fill the ranks of the Einsatzgruppen and several senior Kripo commanders, Arthur Nebe among them, were assigned as Einsatzgruppen commanders. The Einsatzgruppen mobile death squad units perpetrated atrocities in the occupied Soviet Union, including mass murder of Jews, communists, prisoners of war, and hostages, and played a key role in the Holocaust.

== Post World War II ==
In 1945, the occupying Allied Powers began their own programme of de-Nazification. It was understood that, in a totalitarian state, few people could participate in public service without also being members of the Nazi Party. Party membership alone was not viewed as sufficient grounds for dismissal, but allegations of involvement or complicity in Nazi war crimes or crimes against humanity were investigated and any police official convicted was sentenced in the usual way.

However, the Allied Powers felt the rule of law would be jeopardised by the mass-sacking of police officials who had served the Nazi state and that maintaining the continuity of a civilian and indigenous police force from the outset, together with all its accumulated practical skills and experience, was the most efficient way of restoring democracy to the German people. Thus the Kriminalpolizei adapted once more to the changes in oversight and accountability and, as with other public servants, took the political and economic change of the post-war years in its stride.

Eastern Germany organised centralized Volkspolizei with Criminal Investigation Department (Hauptabteilung Kriminalpolizei).

== Present day ==
The Federal Republic of Germany divides police responsibilities between federal and state authorities. The state police or Landespolizei of the federal states perform the majority of investigations in Germany.

Within the Landespolizei, the Criminal Investigation Department is known as the Kriminalpolizei or Kripo. The various Kriminalpolizei departments are organised according to state law and report, ultimately, to the Interior Ministry of their state. As the vast majority of police work is performed at state level, the Kriminalpolizei conducts most criminal investigations in Germany.

Kriminalpolizei detectives investigate crimes and incidents and work in plainclothes. They collect evidence, interview victims and witnesses and question suspects. Detectives are also involved in the location of missing persons and the recovery of stolen property. Investigators may be assigned to precinct detective squads or one of dozens of specialized investigative units that have borough, citywide or regional jurisdiction.

Kripo candidates are mostly regular state police officers who have done well in police school and in their first years of street duty. After rigorous screening and examination, a small number are chosen to receive a technical education in criminology at a police college. Those completing the course then serve a three-year apprenticeship before attaining full status as an investigator.

Joint investigation teams are often formed with German Federal Police and customs investigators to combat drug smuggling or organised crime activities. Each state also has a state investigation bureau or Landeskriminalamt, generally located in the state capital, to assist the Kripo in cases that require specialist forensic or investigative resources.

German police departments have separate Staatsschutz departments within the Kripo to investigate politically motivated crime. German intelligence agencies have no executive police powers. Their operatives are not authorized to carry out arrests, searches of premises, interrogations or confiscations. If they establish that judicial or police measures are required, they hand the matter over to the courts, public prosecutors or Kripo state security (Staatsschutz) officers who decide independently what action is justified.

The Bundeskriminalamt, the German Federal Investigation Bureau, and the federal police, Bundespolizei, have their own investigators but these are not referred to as Kriminalpolizei. It is technically possible to transfer from the federal police to the Kripo, but in practice there is little demand for this.

== Switzerland ==
The responsibility for law and order in Switzerland basically lies with the cantons where the cantonal police (Kantonspolizei) are responsible for investigations. The Swiss federal structure is reflected in a number of cantonal police services, which are organised in different ways, but in the German-speaking cantons, the criminal investigation departments are generally known as Kriminalpolizei.

== See also ==
- Landespolizei
- Sicherheitspolizei (Weimar Republic)
- Sicherheitspolizei (Nazi-era)
- Kripos (Norway)
