= Ernst Kaltenbrunner =

Austrian SS official (1903–1946)

- Kaltenbrunner in 1943

Director of the Reich Security Main Office
- In office 30 January 1943 – 8 May 1945
- Appointed by: Adolf Hitler
- Preceded by: Reinhard Heydrich / Heinrich Himmler (acting)
- Succeeded by: Office abolished

Director of the Sicherheitsdienst (SD)
- In office 30 January 1943 – 8 May 1945
- Preceded by: Reinhard Heydrich / Heinrich Himmler (acting)
- Succeeded by: Office abolished

President of the International Criminal Police Commission (Note: Now known as Interpol.)
- In office 30 January 1943 – 12 May 1945
- Leader: Oskar Dressler as Secretary-general
- Preceded by: Arthur Nebe
- Succeeded by: Florent Louwage

Higher SS and Police Leader of Austria
- In office 13 March 1938 – 30 January 1943
- Preceded by: Office established
- Succeeded by: Rudolf Querner

Additional positions
- April–May 1945: Commander-in-chief of Southern Germany
- 1943–1945: Commander of the Einsatzgruppen
- 1938–1945: Member of the Greater German Reichstag
- March 1938: State Secretary of Public Security of Austria
- 1931–1933: District Speaker of the Nazi Party in Upper Austria

Personal details
- Born: 4 October 1903 Ried im Innkreis, Austria-Hungary
- Died: 16 October 1946 (aged 43) Nuremberg, Germany
- Party: Nazi Party
- Spouse: Elisabeth Eder (m. 1934)
- Domestic partner: Gisela Gräfin von Westarp (1943–1945)
- Children: 5
- Education: University of Graz
- Profession: Lawyer
- Cabinet: Seyss-Inquart government
- SS service
- Allegiance: Nazi Germany
- Branch: Schutzstaffel (SS)
- Service years: 1931–1945
- Rank: SS-Obergruppenführer
- Criminal information
- Status: Executed by hanging
- Convictions: War crimes Crimes against humanity
- Trial: Nuremberg trials
- Penalty: Death
- Ernst Kaltenbrunner's voice Kaltenbrunner's closing statement at the Nuremberg trials Recorded 31 August 1946

Ernst Kaltenbrunner (4 October 1903 – 16 October 1946) was an Austrian lawyer, high-ranking SS official during the Nazi era, major perpetrator of the Holocaust, and convicted war criminal. After the assassination of Reinhard Heydrich in 1942, and a brief period under Heinrich Himmler, Kaltenbrunner was named the third director of the Reich Security Main Office (RSHA), which included the offices of Gestapo, Kripo and SD, serving from January 1943 until the end of World War II in Europe. He was also the president of Interpol during the same time period.

Kaltenbrunner obtained a doctorate in law from the University of Graz in 1926. He joined the Nazi Party in 1930 and the SS in 1931, and by 1935 he was considered a leader of the Austrian SS. In 1938, he assisted in the Anschluss and was given command of the SS and police force in Austria. In January 1943, Kaltenbrunner was appointed chief of the RSHA, succeeding Reinhard Heydrich, who had been assassinated in June 1942.

A committed antisemite, Kaltenbrunner played a pivotal role in orchestrating the Holocaust, which intensified under his leadership. He oversaw the coordination of security and law enforcement agencies involved in widespread extermination, the suppression of resistance movements in occupied territories, extensive arrests, deportations, and executions. He was the highest-ranking member of the SS to face trial (Himmler having committed suicide in May 1945) at the Nuremberg trials, where he was found guilty of war crimes and crimes against humanity. Kaltenbrunner was sentenced to death, and was executed by hanging on 16 October 1946.

== Personal life ==
Kaltenbrunner was born in Ried im Innkreis, Austria-Hungary, and growing up had a close relationship with his mother (born Theresia Utwardy). His father Hugo was a lawyer, and Kaltenbrunner spent his early years and primary education in Raab, later attending the Realgymnasium in Linz. Raised in a nationalist family, his ideological understanding of the world was shaped to some extent by the völkisch Pan-Germanism movement in Austria, since his father was an adherent to its ideals. Like his father, the younger Kaltenbrunner's pan-Germanism—replete with antisemitism and the notion that political conflict was a racial struggle—was cultivated in the nationalist student fraternities known as Burschenschaften. (Note: Pan-Germanists like Kaltenbrunner sought German unity based on racial purity, particularly among the educated German-Austrian elite in the late 19th century. This ideology rejected liberalism, socialism, democracy, Catholicism, Slavic nationalism, and the Habsburg multinational state, blaming them for obstructing a utopian vision of cultural and economic security. Pan-Germans traced these influences to Enlightenment rationalism and the French Revolution, identifying Jews as the chief beneficiaries of modernization and urbanization. They idealized a "pure" Germanic society rooted in rural, medieval traditions while portraying Jews and urban culture as corrupting forces. This worldview framed modernity as a threat and called for a "conservative revolution" to restore a mythical past.) Kaltenbrunner was incidentally also childhood friends with Adolf Eichmann, the infamous SS officer who later played a key role in implementing the Nazis' "Final Solution" against Europe's Jews. (Note: It was Kaltenbrunner who presented Eichmann with his Nazi membership application in April 1932 and seven months later, it was Kaltenbrunner who suggested to Eichmann that he should also join the SS.)

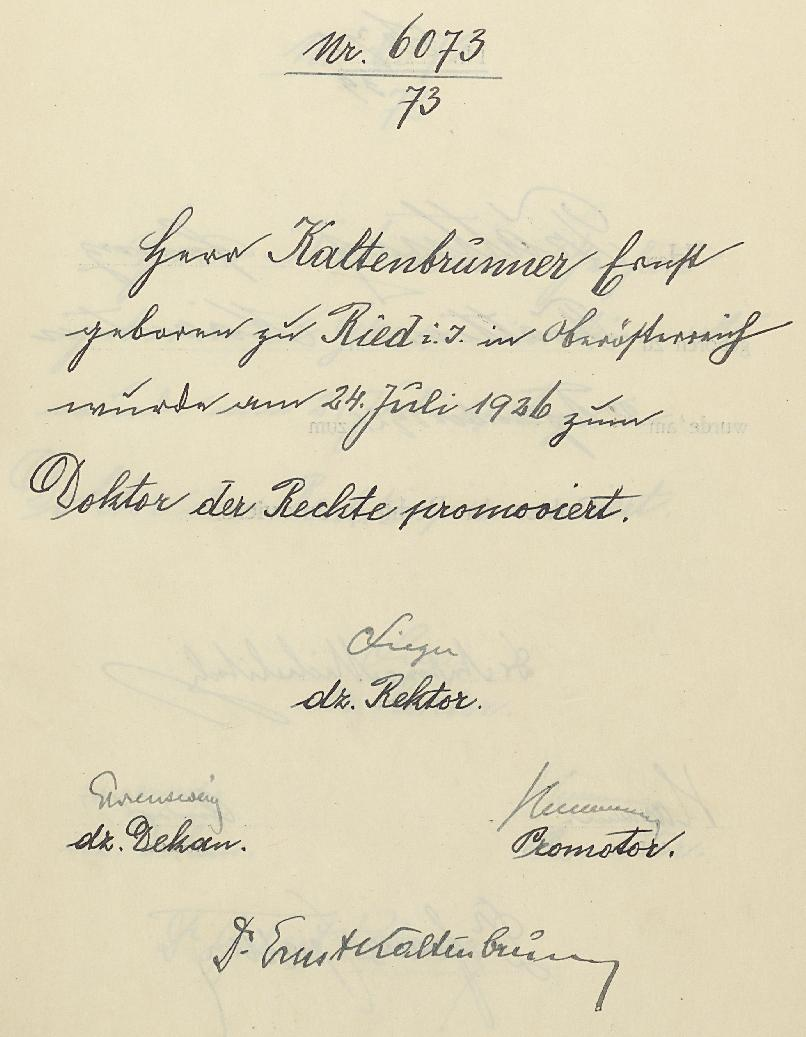
Kaltenbrunner's graduation record, 1926

After finishing gymnasium in 1921, Kaltenbrunner first studied chemistry at the University of Graz, where his father had matriculated, but switched to law in 1923. While studying at Graz, he joined the Arminia fraternity, became active in student politics, and participated in demonstrations against Marxism and clerical influence. He obtained his doctorate in 1926. Kaltenbrunner then worked at a law firm in Salzburg for a year before opening his own law office in Linz. He had deep scars on his face reportedly from duelling in his student days, although some sources attribute them to a drunk-driving crash. (Note: See: "The Nuremberg Trials". Archived from the original on 12 March 2001.)

By 1928, Kaltenbrunner was bored, lonely, and unfulfilled according to historian Peter Black; however Kaltenbrunner's work as a provincial lawyer in Linz also brought him into the right-wing "gymnastic circles in Linz" where he joined the Deutsch-Volkischer Turnverein, an organization with close ties to the paramilitary formation of the Austrian Heimwehr. Black described this latter organization as "a training ground for the illegal Nazi SA and SS". In the summer of 1929, Kaltenbrunner joined the Heimwehr, which Black claims merged his "emotional need for membership in a community" with his political ideals.

On 14 January 1934, Kaltenbrunner married Elisabeth Eder (20 October 1908 – 20 May 2002), who was also a Nazi Party member; the couple had three children. In addition to the children from his marriage, Kaltenbrunner had twins, Ursula and Wolfgang (b. 1945) with his long-time mistress, Gisela Gräfin von Westarp (27 June 1920 – 2 June 1983). All the children survived the war.

== SS career ==
On 18 October 1930, Kaltenbrunner joined the Nazi Party as member number 300,179. (Note: Kaltenbrunner later told his children that he left the Heimwehr because its leaders were "incompetent and politically fickle" and because it "had changed from a nonpartisan, anti-Marxist movement to the political line of the Christian Socials." An additionally important factor in Kaltenbrunner joining the Nazis identified by historian Peter Black, was nothing less than the "Nazis’ commitment to Anschluss", since the idealistic Austrian viewed the union between Germany and Austria as one that heralded a glorious future.) In 1931, he was the Bezirksredner (district speaker) for the Nazi Party in Upper Austria. Kaltenbrunner joined the Schutzstaffel (SS) on 31 August 1931 after encouragement by then leader of Hitler's bodyguard, SS-Standartenführer Sepp Dietrich; his SS number being 13,039. Black writes that "Kaltenbrunner found in the Nazi movement and the SS what he politically desired and emotionally needed: a world where the ideal of the racial community was prized, where the theory of racial struggle was accepted as an obvious fact, where all doubts about the meaning of existence were swept away."

Kaltenbrunner first became a Rechtsberater (legal consultant) for the Nazi Party in 1929 and later held this same position for SS Abschnitt (Section) VIII, beginning in 1932. That same year he began working at the law practice of his father, who had taken ill. In October 1932, Ernst Röhm appointed Kaltenbrunner as an SA- und SS-Gruppenrechtsberater, making it his job to provide free legal counsel for members of either unit should they be arrested for "performing their duty". By 1933, Kaltenbrunner had become head of the National-Socialist Lawyers' League in Linz.

In January 1934, Kaltenbrunner was briefly jailed at the Kaisersteinbruch detention camp with other Nazis for conspiracy by the Engelbert Dollfuss government. While there, he led a hunger strike against the inadequate food rations, poor sanitary conditions, and unfair treatment by the Heimwehr guards at the camp, which forced the government to release 490 of the party members. In 1935, he was jailed again on suspicion of high treason; more specifically, Kaltenbrunner was accused of spreading Nazi propaganda materials to the army. This charge was dropped, but he was sentenced to six months imprisonment for conspiracy and he lost his license to practice law. Although many of the accused and arrested Austrian Nazis emigrated to Germany, Kaltenbrunner remained in Austria—a fact he shared with an acquaintance in 1935—at Himmler's insistence, who saw in the Austrian a useful associate for strengthening the SS there.

From mid-1935 Kaltenbrunner was head of the illegal SS Abschnitt VIII in Linz and was considered a leader of the Austrian SS. To provide Heinrich Himmler, Reinhard Heydrich and Heinz Jost with new information, Kaltenbrunner repeatedly made trips to Bavaria. He would hide on a train and on a ship that traveled to Passau, then return with money and orders for Austrian comrades. During his trips between the two countries, he frequently carried detailed reports gathered by the Nazi underground in Austria, including photos Kaltenbrunner had taken in autumn 1936 of confidential documents that detailed Austria's foreign policy. During January 1937, Himmler appointed Kaltenbrunner chief of the entire Austrian SS. Kaltenbrunner was arrested again by Austrian authorities on charges of heading the illegal Nazi Party organization (the Nazi Relief Office) in Oberösterreich. He was released in September.

Acting on orders from Hermann Göring, Kaltenbrunner assisted in bringing about the Anschluss with Germany (13 March 1938); he was awarded the role of State Secretary for Public Security in the Seyss-Inquart cabinet of 11 to 13 March 1938. Controlled from behind the scenes by Himmler, Kaltenbrunner still led, albeit clandestinely, the Austrian SS as part of his duty to "coordinate" and manage the Austrian population – this entailed the Nazification of all aspects of Austrian society. Then on 21 March 1938, he was promoted to SS-Brigadeführer. At the 10 April 1938 parliamentary election, he was elected to the Reichstag as a deputy from Ostmark. He retained this seat until the fall of the Nazi regime on 8 May 1945. Amid this activity, he helped establish the Mauthausen-Gusen concentration camp near Linz. Mauthausen was the first Nazi concentration camp opened in Austria following the Anschluss. On 11 September 1938, Kaltenbrunner was promoted to the rank of SS-Gruppenführer (equivalent to a lieutenant general in the German Army) while holding the position of leader of SS-Oberabschnitt Österreich (re-designated SS-Oberabschnitt Donau in November 1938). Also in 1938, he was appointed Higher SS and Police Leader (Höherer SS- und Polizeiführer; HSSPF) for Oberabschnitt Donau, which was the primary SS command in Austria (he held that post until 30 January 1943).

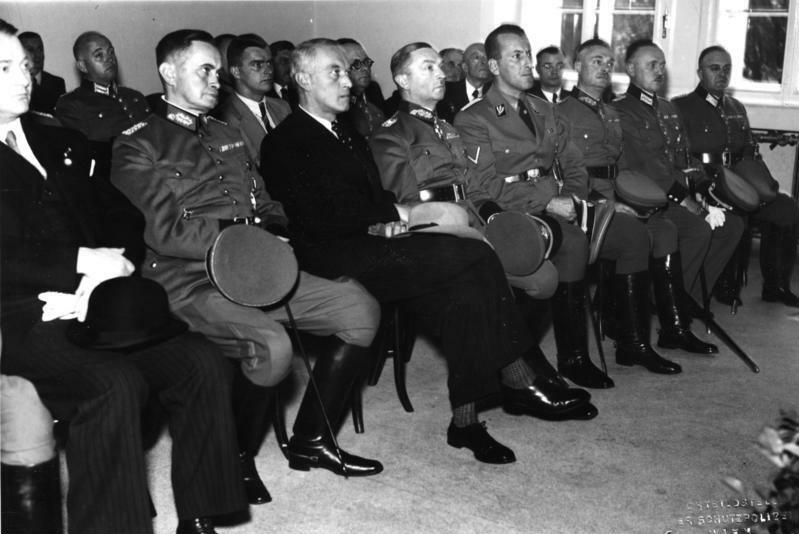
Kaltenbrunner with Ordnungspolizei officials in Vienna in 1940 following the 1938 Anschluss

=== World War II ===
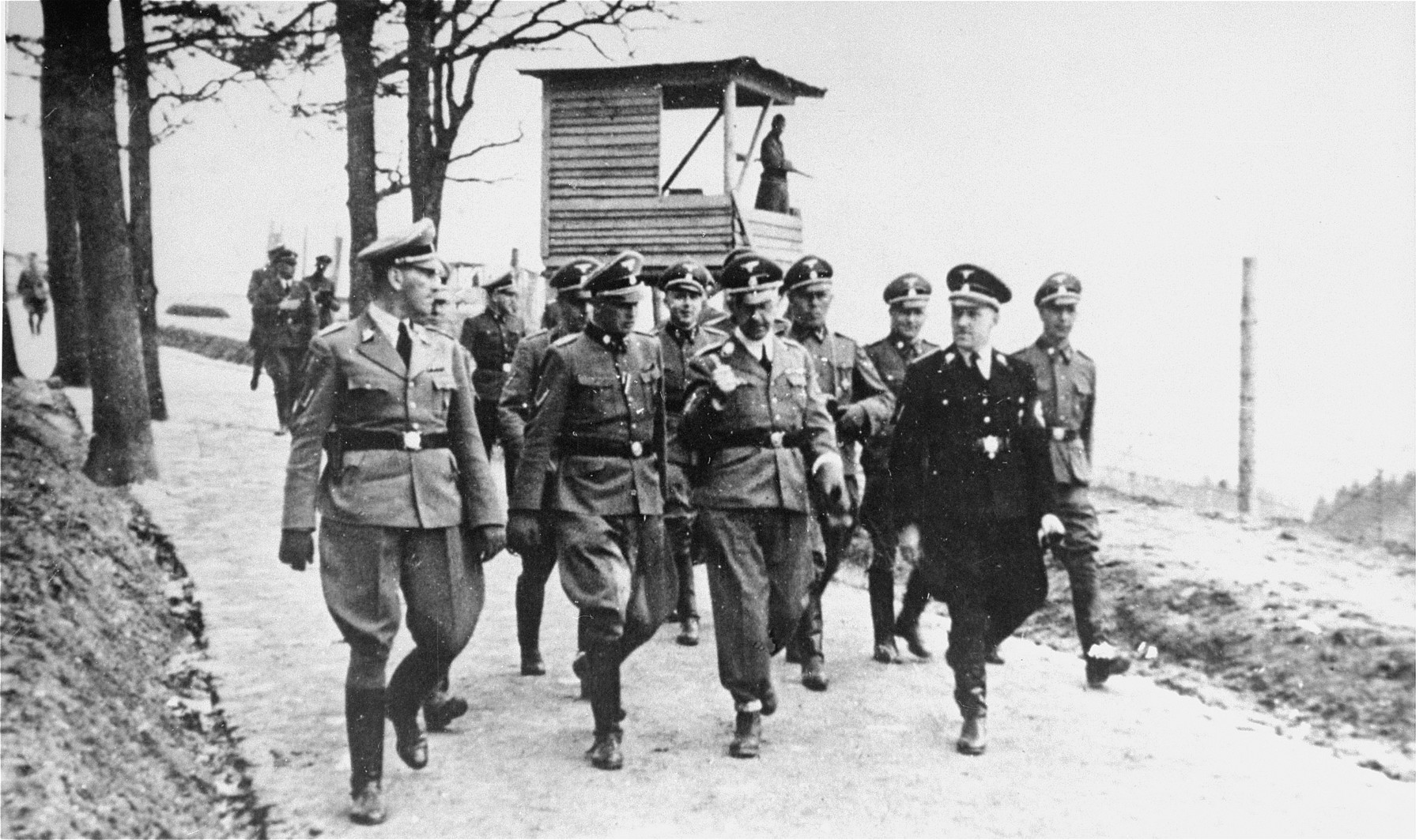
Kaltenbrunner, Heinrich Himmler and August Eigruber (in black) inspect Mauthausen concentration camp in 1941, in the company of camp commander Franz Ziereis (center left)

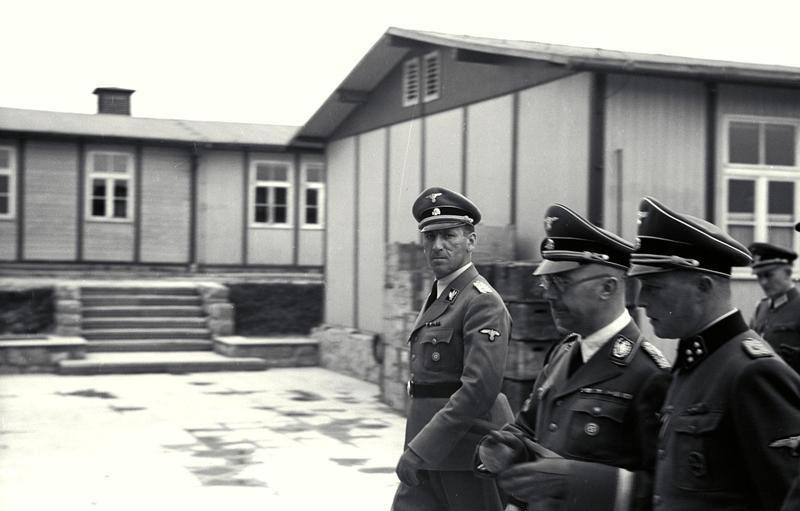
Kaltenbrunner with Himmler and Ziereis at Mauthausen in April 1941

In June 1940, Kaltenbrunner was appointed Vienna's chief of police and held that additional post for a year. In July 1940, he was commissioned as an SS-Untersturmführer into the Waffen-SS Reserve. Alongside his many official duties, Kaltenbrunner also developed an intelligence network across Austria, moving southeastwards, which eventually brought him to Himmler's attention for appointment as chief of the Reich Security Main Office (RSHA) in January 1943. The RSHA was composed of the SiPo (Sicherheitspolizei; the combined forces of the Gestapo and Kripo) along with the SD (Sicherheitsdienst, Security Service). Kaltenbrunner replaced Heydrich, who had been assassinated in June 1942. Kaltenbrunner held this position until the end of World War II. Hardly anyone knew Kaltenbrunner, and upon his appointment, Himmler transferred responsibility both for SS personnel and for economics from the RSHA to the SS Main Economic and Administrative Office. Nonetheless, Kaltenbrunner was promoted to SS-Obergruppenführer und General der Polizei on 21 June 1943. He also replaced Heydrich as president (serving from 1943 to 1945) of the International Criminal Police Commission (ICPC), the organization today known as Interpol.

Fearing a collapsing home-front due to the Allied bombing campaigns, and worried that another "stab-in-the-back" at home could arise as a result, Kaltenbrunner immediately tightened the Nazi grip within Germany. From what historian Anthony Read relates, Kaltenbrunner's appointment as RSHA chief came as a surprise given the other possible candidates like the head of the Gestapo, Heinrich Müller, or even the SD foreign-intelligence chief, Walter Schellenberg. Historian Richard Grunberger also added the name of Wilhelm Stuckart, the future minister of the German Interior, as another potential candidate for head of the RSHA; however, he suggests that Kaltenbrunner was most likely selected since he was a comparative "newcomer", expected to be more "pliable" in Himmler's hands.

Like many of the ideological fanatics in the regime, Kaltenbrunner was a committed antisemite. According to former SS-Sturmbannführer Hans Georg Mayer, Kaltenbrunner was present at a December 1940 meeting among Adolf Hitler, Joseph Goebbels, Himmler and Heydrich where it was decided to gas all Jews incapable of heavy physical work. Under Kaltenbrunner's command, the genocide of Jews picked up pace as "the process of extermination was to be expedited and the concentration of the Jews in the Reich itself and the occupied countries were to be liquidated as soon as possible." Kaltenbrunner stayed constantly informed over the status of concentration-camp activities, receiving periodic reports at his office in the RSHA.

To combat homosexuality across the greater Reich, Kaltenbrunner pushed the Ministry of justice in July 1943 for an edict mandating compulsory castration for anyone found guilty of this offence. While this was rejected, he still took steps to get the army to review some 6,000 cases to prosecute homosexuals.

During the summer of 1943, Kaltenbrunner conducted his second inspection of the Mauthausen-Gusen concentration camp. International Military Tribunal evidence reports that on this occasion 15 prisoners were selected by the detention chief, Unterscharführer Winkler, to demonstrate for Kaltenbrunner three methods of killing: by a gunshot to the neck, hanging, and gassing; after the executions had been carried out, Kaltenbrunner visited the crematorium and later the quarry. (Note: According to the IMT documents, ...about 15 prisoners under detention were selected by the detention chief, Unterscharführer Winkler, in order to show Dr. Kaltenbrunner three ways of extermination: by a shot in the neck, hanging, and gassing...Dr. Kaltenbrunner went to the crematorium after the execution and later he went into the quarry.) In October 1943, he told Herbert Kappler, the head of German police and security services in Rome, that the "eradication of the Jews in Italy" was of "special interest" for "general security". Four days later, Kappler's SS and police units began rounding up and deporting Jews by train to Auschwitz concentration camp.

In 1944, during an arranged meeting in Klessheim Castle near Salzburg, when Hitler was in the process of strong-arming Admiral Horthy into a closer integration between Hungary and Nazi Germany, Kaltenbrunner was present for the negotiations and escorted Horthy out once they were over. Accompanying Horthy and Kaltenbrunner on the journey back to Hungary, Adolf Eichmann brought with him a special Einsatzkommando unit to begin the process of rounding up and deporting Hungary's 750,000 Jews. It was said that even Himmler feared him, as Kaltenbrunner was an intimidating figure with 1.94m (6'4½") in height, facial scars, and volatile temper.

Kaltenbrunner was also a longtime friend of Otto Skorzeny and recommended him for many secret missions, allowing Skorzeny to become one of Hitler's favourite agents. Kaltenbrunner also allegedly headed Operation Long Jump, an alleged plan to assassinate Stalin, Churchill, and Roosevelt in Tehran in 1943. (Note: This mission was thwarted by Soviet intelligence agent Gevork Vartanian. See the following article:"Armenian intelligence agent, a hero of the Soviet Union Gevorg Vardanian passed away". 10 January 2012.)

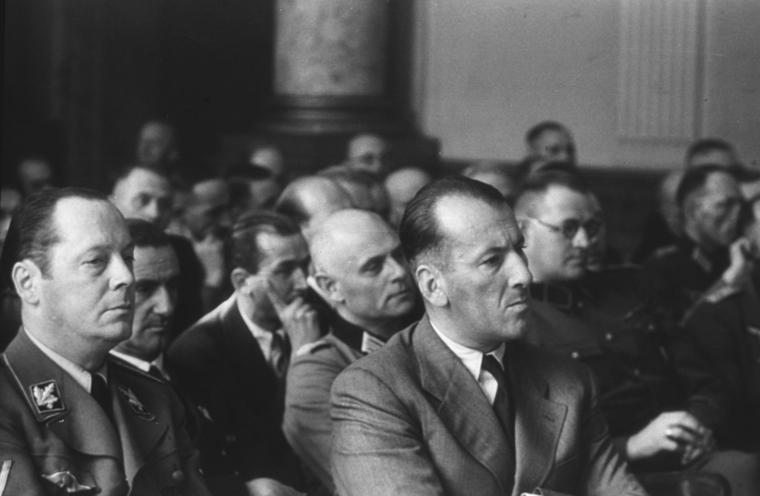
Kaltenbrunner (front row, second from left) as a spectator at a People's Court show trial following the failed 20 July plot in 1944

Immediately in the wake of the 20 July Plot on Hitler's life in 1944, Kaltenbrunner was summoned to Hitler's wartime headquarters at the Wolfsschanze (Wolf's Lair) in East Prussia to begin the investigation into who had planned the assassination attempt. Once it was revealed that an attempted military coup against Hitler had been launched, Himmler and Kaltenbrunner had to tread carefully, as the military was not under the jurisdiction of the Gestapo or the SD. When the attempt failed, the conspirators were soon identified. Kaltenbrunner called for the execution of those implicated in the plot. An estimated 5,000 people were eventually executed, with many more sent to concentration camps. (Note: Noted Hitler biographer, Sir Ian Kershaw, puts the figure of executed persons at exactly 4,980.)

Not only was Kaltenbrunner involved in investigating the July plot, but he was also responsible for the destruction of the Zossen documents—a clandestine archive of Nazi crimes and coup-planning materials assembled by Hans von Dohnanyi and Hans Oster of the Abwehr since 1933, stored in a safe at the OKH headquarters complex at Zossen, Brandenburg. On 22 September 1944, the documents were discovered in a safe at the former Abwehr headquarters at Zossen, which enabled Kaltenbrunner to report triumphantly to Bormann that concrete plans to topple Hitler had existed as early as the Blomberg–Fritsch crisis of February 1938, and that Abwehr chief Wilhelm Canaris (among others) had been implicated in them. Kaltenbrunner personally supervised the transport of the Zossen documents to Schloss Mittersill in the Tyrol, where they were burned.

Historian Heinz Höhne counted Kaltenbrunner among the fanatical Hitler loyalists and described him as being committed "to the bitter end". Field reports from the SD in October 1944 about deteriorating morale in the military prompted Kaltenbrunner to urge the involvement of the RSHA in military court-martial proceedings, but this was rejected by Himmler, who thought it unwise to interfere in Wehrmacht (military) affairs. In December 1944, Kaltenbrunner was granted the additional rank of General of the Waffen-SS. On 15 November 1944, he was awarded the Knights Cross of the War Merit Cross with Swords. In addition, he was awarded the Nazi Party Golden Party Badge and the Blutorden (Blood Order). Using his authority as Chief of the RSHA, Kaltenbrunner issued a decree on 6 February 1945 that allowed policemen to shoot people at their own discretion deemed "disloyal", without any form of judicial review.

On 12 March 1945, a meeting took place in Vorarlberg between Kaltenbrunner and Carl Jacob Burckhardt, president of the International Committee of the Red Cross (1945–48). Just over a month later, Himmler was informed that SS-Obergruppenführer (general) Karl Wolff had been negotiating with the Allies for the capitulation of Italy. When questioned by Himmler, Wolff explained that he was operating under Hitler's orders and attempting to play separate Allies against one another. Himmler believed him, but Kaltenbrunner did not, and told Himmler that an informant claimed that Wolff had also negotiated with Cardinal Schuster of Milan and was about to surrender occupied Italy to the Allies. Himmler angrily repeated the allegations; Wolff, feigning offence, challenged Himmler to present these statements to Hitler. Unnerved by Wolff's demands, Himmler backed down, and Hitler sent Wolff back to Italy to continue his purported disruption of the Allies. (Note: According to a U.S. Army official publication written by Ernest J. Fisher, Jr, "... Wolff had finally gone to Berlin for a face-to-face confrontation with Hitler and the Reichsfuehrer SS. Two days later Wolff, proving an exception to the rule that those summoned peremptorily to the Fuehrer's headquarters rarely came back, returned to Italy with assurances that nothing had been compromised." Through intermediaries, Wolff explained to Dulles that he had convinced Hitler that his discussions with the Allied leaders "had been only a ploy to gain time and divide the Allied coalition. Satisfied, the Fuehrer ordered him back to his post with no restrictions other than to forbid travel to Switzerland." German journalist Heinz Höhne characterizes this acceptance of Wolff's gambit as a charge for him to "seek better terms with the U.S. forces", but this may have been nothing more than another expression for stalling the Allies accordingly, given Hitler's later refusal to surrender under any circumstances and his vitriol against his closest confidants for having independently attempted to negotiate with the Allies.)

On 18 April 1945, three weeks before the war ended, Himmler named Kaltenbrunner commander-in-chief of the remaining German forces in southern Europe. Kaltenbrunner attempted to organize cells for post-war sabotage in the region and Germany but accomplished little. Hitler made one of his last appearances on 20 April 1945 outside the subterranean Führerbunker in Berlin, where he pinned medals on boys from the Hitler Youth for their bravery. (Note: See: "Hitler – Last Known Film Footage". AwesomeStories.com.) Kaltenbrunner was among those present, but realizing the end was near, he then fled from Berlin.

=== Arrest ===
On 12 May 1945 Kaltenbrunner was apprehended along with his adjutant, Arthur Scheidler, and two SS guards in a remote cabin at the top of the Totes Gebirge mountains near Altaussee, Austria, by a search party initiated by the 80th Infantry Division, Third U.S. Army. Information had been gained from Johann Brandauer, the assistant burgermeister of Altaussee, that the party was hiding out with false papers in the cabin. This was supported by an eyewitness sighting by the Altaussee mountain ranger five days earlier. Special Agent Robert E. Matteson from the U.S. Army's Counterintelligence Corps Detachment organized and led a patrol consisting of Brandauer, four ex-Wehrmacht soldiers, and a squad of U.S. soldiers to effect the arrest. The party climbed over mountainous and glacial terrain for six hours in darkness before arriving at the cabin. After a short standoff, all four men exited the cabin and surrendered without a shot fired. Kaltenbrunner claimed to be a doctor and offered a false name. However, upon their arrival back to town his last mistress, Countess Gisela von Westarp, and the wife (Iris) of his adjutant Arthur Scheidler chanced to spot the men being led away; the ladies called out to both men and embraced them. This action resulted in their identification and arrest by U.S. troops.

In 2001, Ernst Kaltenbrunner's personal Nazi security seal was found in an Alpine lake in Styria, Austria, 56 years after he had thrown it away to hide his identity. The seal was recovered by a Dutch citizen on holiday. The seal has the words "Chef der Sicherheitspolizei und des SD" (Chief of the Security Police and SD) engraved on it. Experts have examined the seal and believe it was discarded in the final days of the European war in May 1945.

=== Nuremberg trials ===
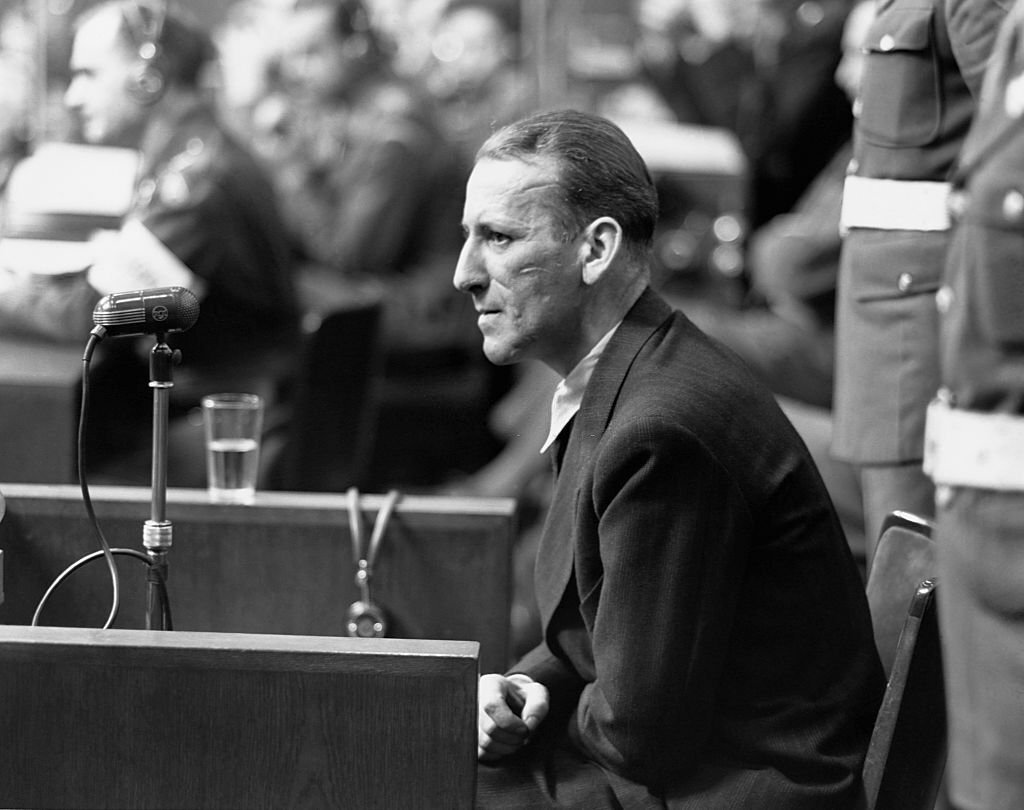
Kaltenbrunner testifying as a witness on his own behalf at the International Military Tribunal.

At the Nuremberg trials, Kaltenbrunner was charged with conspiracy to commit crimes against peace, war crimes and crimes against humanity. Due to the areas over which he exercised responsibility as an SS general and as chief of the RSHA, he was acquitted of crimes against peace, but held responsible for war crimes and crimes against humanity.

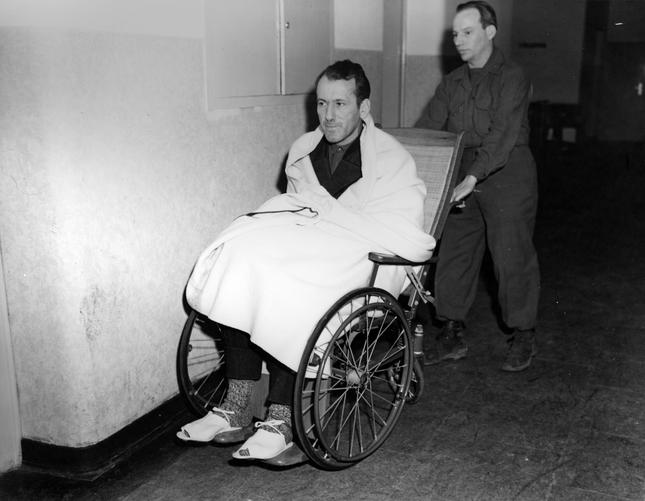
Kaltenbrunner wheeled into court during the Nuremberg trials after a brain hemorrhage during interrogation.

During the initial stages of the Nuremberg trials, Kaltenbrunner was absent because of two episodes of subarachnoid hemorrhage, which required several weeks of recovery time. He was examined by Chief Medical Officer Lt. Col. Rene Juchli who reported that Kaltenbrunner was suffering from gallstones. After his health improved, the tribunal denied his request for pardon. When he was released from a military hospital he pleaded not guilty to the charges of the indictment against him. Kaltenbrunner said all decrees and legal documents that bore his signature were "rubber-stamped" and filed by his adjutant(s). He also said Gestapo Chief Heinrich Müller had illegally affixed his signature to numerous documents in question.

Despite his reputation as "the man who terrified millions" and his intimidating appearance, Kaltenbrunner was, of the high-ranking Nazis on trial, one of the least capable of coping with the pressures of prison life. American psychiatrist Douglas Kelley, who spent months interviewing and evaluating the prisoners, described him as "a crybaby ...the hardness of character which marked him as an executioner had been replaced with this soft, sobbing personality", who crumbled into fits of depression, and was deeply frightened by the prospects of the trial.

Kaltenbrunner argued in his defence that his position as RSHA chief existed only theoretically and said he was only active in matters of espionage and intelligence. He maintained that Himmler, as his superior, was the person culpable for the atrocities committed during his tenure as chief of the RSHA. Kaltenbrunner also asserted that he had no knowledge of the Final Solution before 1943 and went on to claim that he protested against the ill-treatment of the Jews to Himmler and Hitler. Further denials from Kaltenbrunner included statements that he knew nothing of the Commissar Order and that he never visited Mauthausen concentration camp, despite documentation of his visit. At one point, Kaltenbrunner went so far as to avow that he was responsible for bringing the Final Solution to an end. In response to his denials, people in the courtroom laughed. During the trial, Hans Bernd Gisevius described Kaltenbrunner as "even worse than that monster Heydrich".

==== Conviction and execution ====
On 30 September 1946, the International Military Tribunal (IMT) found Kaltenbrunner not guilty of crimes against peace, but guilty of war crimes and crimes against humanity (counts three and four). On 1 October 1946, the IMT sentenced him to death by hanging.

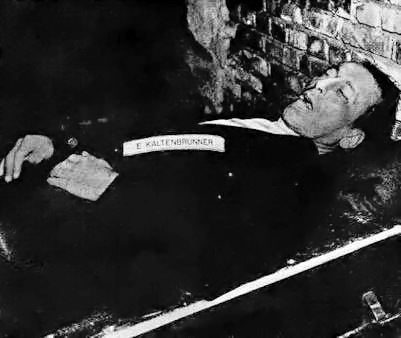
Kaltenbrunner's body after execution by hanging on 16 October 1946

Kaltenbrunner was executed on 16 October 1946, around 1:15 am, in Nuremberg. His body, like those of the other nine executed men and that of Hermann Göring (who committed suicide the previous day), was cremated at the Eastern Cemetery in Munich and the ashes were scattered in a tributary of the River Isar.

=== Dates of rank ===
- SS-Mann – 31 August 1931
- SS-Truppführer – 1931
- SS-Sturmhauptführer – 25 September 1932
- SS-Standartenführer – 20 April 1936
- SS-Oberführer – 20 April 1937
- SS-Brigadeführer – 21 March 1938
- SS-Gruppenführer – 11 September 1938
- SS-Untersturmführer der Reserve der Waffen-SS – 1 July 1940
- Generalleutnant der Polizei – 1 April 1941
- SS-Obergruppenführer und General der Polizei – 21 June 1943
- General der Waffen-SS und Polizei – 1 December 1944

Awards and decorations

- Honour Chevron for the Old Guard (1934)
- SS Honour Ring (1938)
- Sword of honour of the Reichsführer-SS (1938)
- Anschluss Medal (1938)
- Sudetenland Medal (1938) with Prague Castle Bar (1939)
- Golden Party Badge (1939)
- SS Long Service Award For 4, 8, and 12 Years Service
- Nazi Party Long Service Award in Bronze and Silver
- Blood Order (31 May 1942)
- German Cross in Silver (1943)
- Knights Cross of the War Merit Cross with Swords (1944)

== See also ==
- Allgemeine SS
- Holocaust (miniseries) – TV production in which Kaltenbrunner is portrayed by Hans Meyer.
- Inside the Third Reich – television film in which Kaltenbrunner is portrayed by Hans Meyer.
- List of SS-Obergruppenführer
- List of major perpetrators of the Holocaust
- List of defendants at the International Military Tribunal

Government offices
Preceded by Heinrich Himmler; Acting	Director of the Reich Security Main Office; 30 January 1943 – 12 May 1945	Office abolished
Preceded by Arthur Nebe	President of the ICPC; 30 January 1943 – 12 May 1945	Succeeded by Florent Louwage
Military offices
Office established	Commander-in-Chief of Southern Germany; 18 April 1945 – 2 May 1945	Succeeded by Albert Kesselring
