= Reich Security Main Office =

Nazi German police and intelligence organization (1939–1945)

- Reichssicherheitshauptamt (RSHA)
- Flag for the Chief of the SiPo and SD

RSHA overview
- Formed: 27 September 1939
- Preceding agencies: Sicherheitspolizei (SiPo); Sicherheitsdienst (SD)
- Dissolved: 8 May 1945
- Type: • Secret police • Intelligence agency
- Jurisdiction: Germany; Occupied Europe
- Headquarters: Prinz-Albrecht-Straße 8, Berlin; 52°30′26″N 13°22′57″E
- Employees: 50,648 (February 1944 est.)
- Minister responsible: Heinrich Himmler, (1939–1945)
- RSHA executives: Reinhard Heydrich (1939–1942), Chief of SiPo and SD; Heinrich Himmler (1942–1943), Acting Chief of SiPo and SD; Ernst Kaltenbrunner (1943–1945), Chief of SiPo and SD
- Parent RSHA: Ministry of the Interior (nominally); Allgemeine SS
- Child agencies: Gestapo; Sicherheitsdienst (SD); Sicherheitspolizei (SiPo); Kriminalpolizei (Kripo)

The Reich Security Main Office (Note: The Reichssicherheitshauptamt is variously translated in sources as "Reich Security Main Office", "Reich Main Security Office", "Reich Central Security Main Office", "Reich Security Central Office", "Reich Head Security Office", or "Reich Security Head Office".) (German: Reichssicherheitshauptamt [ˈʁaɪ̯çsˌzɪçɐhaɪ̯t͡sˌhaʊ̯ptʔamt], RSHA) was an organization under Heinrich Himmler in his dual capacity as Chef der Deutschen Polizei (Chief of German Police) and Reichsführer-SS, the head of the Nazi Party's Schutzstaffel (SS). The organization's stated duty was to fight all "enemies of the Reich" inside and outside the borders of Nazi Germany. From its very inception, the RSHA was a central institution for the Nazis, playing a pivotal role in orchestrating and executing the Holocaust.

== Formation and development ==
In 1934, the Nazi regime accelerated the centralization of state power, abolishing the sovereignty of Germany's federal states and subordinating them directly to the Reich government. Even before the formal creation of the Reich Security Main Office (RSHA), the Gestapo under Himmler had already asserted nationwide authority, laying the groundwork for a unified security apparatus. These moves toward central control were further reinforced by the establishment of the Volksgerichtshof as a political court to enforce Nazi ideology. Then on 27 September 1939, Himmler officially established the RSHA. His assumption of control over all security and police forces in Germany was a significant factor in the growth in power of the Nazi state. With the formation of the RSHA, Himmler combined under one roof the Nazi Party's Sicherheitsdienst (SD; SS intelligence service) and the Sicherheitspolizei (SiPo; "Security Police"), which was nominally under the Interior Ministry. (Note: The RSHA's purpose was "ostensibly to harmonize the activities of the SD, the Gestapo and the police," but instead merely added another layer of management to an already confusing and "overlapping array of agencies," according to historian David Cesarini.) The SiPo was composed of two sub-departments, the Geheime Staatspolizei (Gestapo; "Secret State Police") and the Kriminalpolizei (Kripo; "Criminal Police"). In correspondence, the RSHA was often abbreviated to RSi-H to avoid confusion with the SS-Rasse- und Siedlungshauptamt (RuSHA; "SS Race and Settlement Office"). The organization's main goal was to protect Nazi Germany against enemies "inside" the country but later became instrumental (by design) in dealing with any opposition in occupied territories. Dealing with any and all forms of "discontent with the war" was certainly one of its roles.

The creation of the RSHA represented the formalization, at the highest level, of the relationship under which the SD served as the intelligence agency for the security police. A similar coordination existed in the local offices, where the Gestapo, criminal police, and SD were formally separate offices. This coordination was carried out by inspectors on the staff of the local higher SS and police leaders. One of the principal functions of the local SD units was to serve as the intelligence agency for the local Gestapo units. In the occupied territories, the formal relationship between local units of the Gestapo, criminal police, and SD was slightly closer.

The RSHA continued to grow at an enormous rate during World War II in Europe. Routine reorganization of the RSHA did not change the tendency for centralization within Nazi Germany, nor did it change the general trend for its members to develop direct relationships to Adolf Hitler, adhering to Nazi Germany's typical pattern of the leader-follower construct. For the RSHA, centrality within Nazi Germany was pronounced since the organization completed the integration of government and Nazi Party offices as to intelligence gathering and security. Departments like the SD and Gestapo (within the RSHA) were controlled directly by Himmler and his immediate subordinate SS-Obergruppenführer and General of Police Reinhard Heydrich; the two held the power of life and death for nearly every German and were essentially above the law. Other figures high in the RSHA like Gestapo chief and Heydrich's deputy Heinrich Müller were similarly empowered—evidenced after the invasion of the Soviet Union—when the latter was charged with evaluating thousands of Soviet soldiers, determining which among them was suitable to retain for reconstructive slave labor and who would be otherwise too dangerous and hence, outright murdered. Heydrich considered either task equivalently important.

Facing a shortage of personnel and vast occupied territories, German military officials in Ukraine initially created auxiliary units, which later fell under SS and Police Leaders (HSSPF) and RSHA authority. By early 1942, Heydrich, acknowledging staffing shortfalls, authorized Einsatzgruppen to recruit indigenous forces for security work, expanding upon earlier efforts like Einsatzgruppe A. Under RSHA guidance, particularly Walter Schellenberg's Office VI, the RSHA also launched Operation Zeppelin, attempting (unsuccessfully) to recruit Soviet POWs and non-Russian ethnic groups for sabotage operations behind Soviet lines.

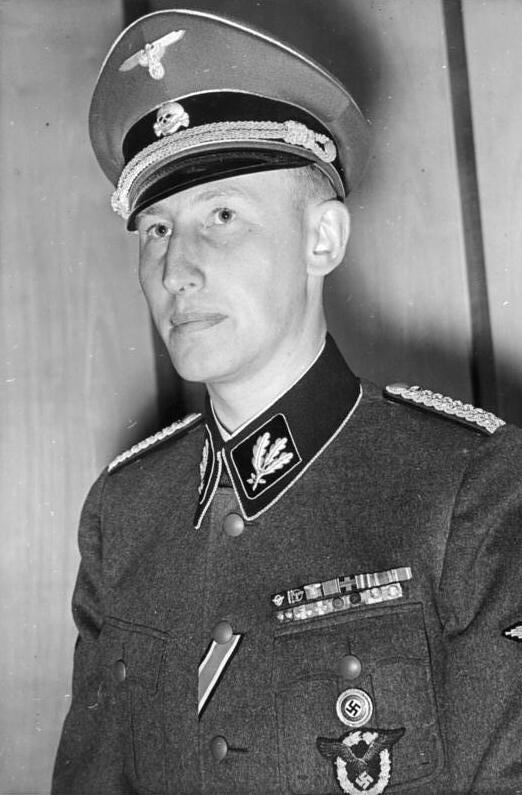
Reinhard Heydrich, the original chief of the RSHA, as an SS-Gruppenführer in August 1940

Heydrich remained the RSHA chief until his assassination in 1942. In January 1943 Himmler delegated the office to SS-Obergruppenführer and General of Police Ernst Kaltenbrunner, who headed the RSHA until the end of the war in Europe. The head of the RSHA was also known as the CSSD or Chef der Sicherheitspolizei und des SD (Chief of the Security Police and of the Security Service).

== Organisation ==
The RSHA "became a typical overblown bureaucracy", wrote British author Gerald Reitlinger. "The complexity of RSHA was unequalled... with at least a hundred... sub-sub-sections, a modest camouflage of the fact that it handled the progressive extermination which Hitler planned for the ten million Jews of Europe".

=== Structure and functions ===
The RSHA functioned as more than a police authority; it was conceived as a uniquely National Socialist institution that fused state and party structures. Its task extended beyond conventional policing to safeguarding the Volksgemeinschaft and Aryan "life force" against enemies defined in racial and ideological terms. In this framework, policy-making was effectively transformed into policing, since the boundaries of race and Volk could not be fixed by law.

The RSHA was deliberately designed as a flexible and mobile "fighting administration" (kämpfende Verwaltung), capable of expanding or dissolving departments, shifting priorities, and creating ad hoc task forces as political needs dictated. Its leaders were not mere bureaucrats; they combined administrative authority with direct participation in repression and terror, moving between central offices in Berlin and operational posts in occupied territories. This combination of ideological mission and structural adaptability made the RSHA the institutional embodiment of the Nazi ambition to construct a racial order free of legal or moral constraints.

The organisation at its simplest was divided into seven offices (Ämter):

- Amt I, "Administration and Legal", originally headed by SS-Gruppenführer Dr. Werner Best. In 1940, he was succeeded by SS-Brigadeführer Bruno Streckenbach. In April 1944, Erich Ehrlinger took over as department chief.
- Amt II, "Ideological Investigation", headed by SS-Brigadeführer Professor Franz Six.
- Amt III, "Spheres of German Life" or the Inland-SD, headed by SS-Gruppenführer Otto Ohlendorf, was the SS information gathering service for inside Germany. It also dealt with ethnic Germans outside of Germany's prewar borders, and matters of culture.
- Amt IV, "Suppression of Opposition". This was the Geheime Staatspolizei, better known by the sobriquet Gestapo. It was headed by SS-Gruppenführer Heinrich Müller. SS-Obersturmbannführer Adolf Eichmann, one of the main architects of the Holocaust, was head of the Amt IV sub-department known as Referat IV B4. It was responsible for the deportation of Jews to concentration or extermination camps.
- Amt V, "Suppression of Crime" Kriminalpolizei (Kripo), originally led by SS-Gruppenführer Arthur Nebe and later by SS-Oberführer Friedrich Panzinger. This was the Criminal Police, which dealt with serious non-political crimes, such as rape, murder, and arson. Amt V was also known as the Reichskriminalpolizeiamt (Reich Criminal Police Department or RKPA).
- Amt VI, "Foreign Intelligence Service" or Ausland-SD, originally led by SS-Brigadeführer Heinz Jost and later by SS-Brigadeführer Walter Schellenberg.
- Amt VII, "Ideological Research and Evaluation" was a reconstitution of Amt II overseen by SS-Brigadeführer Professor Dr. Franz Six. Later it was headed by SS-Obersturmbannführer Paul Dittel. It was responsible for the creation of anti-semitic, anti-masonic propaganda, the sounding of public opinion, and monitoring of Nazi indoctrination by the public.

=== Leadership ===
No.	Portrait	Chief of SiPo and SD	Took office	Left office	Time in office	Party
1	Reinhard Heydrich	SS-Obergruppenführer; Reinhard Heydrich (1904–1942)	27 September 1939	4 June 1942 †	2 years, 250 days	NSDAP
–	Heinrich Himmler	Reichsführer-SS; Heinrich Himmler (1900–1945); Acting	4 June 1942	30 January 1943	240 days	NSDAP
2	Ernst Kaltenbrunner	SS-Obergruppenführer; Ernst Kaltenbrunner (1903–1946)	30 January 1943	12 May 1945	2 years, 102 days	NSDAP

== Ideology and leadership culture ==
The RSHA leadership corps was socially and generationally uniform: about three-quarters were born after 1900, most from lower-middle-class families, and many were the first in their families to attend university. Around two-thirds completed higher education and nearly one-third earned doctorates, making the RSHA a vehicle for upwardly mobile, academically trained elites. Law and political science dominated their studies, though a significant share specialized in the humanities, particularly within the Sicherheitsdienst (SD). More than half had been politically active as students, especially in the National Socialist Student Association, which styled itself as a revolutionary vanguard.

Their worldview was shaped less by doctrine than by a radical belief in will, action, and leadership. They dismissed bourgeois norms and legalistic traditions, arguing that deeds and success alone legitimized authority. Many embraced the idea of the Volk as a "community of blood and fate" (Bluts- oder Schicksalsgemeinschaft), seeing themselves as a "spiritual elite" committed to building a utopian racial order.

Himmler's vision of a pagan religion of blood and ancestry gained little direct support, but his emphasis on genealogy, race, and the creation of a new SS nobility strongly influenced the RSHA leadership. Historian Michael Wildt describes their shared Weltanschauung as uncompromising, driven by an imperative to translate ideology into radical practice. The RSHA thus emerged as a distinctly National Socialist institution—flexible, mobile, and overtly ideological—linking intellectual utopianism with systematic repression and genocide.

== Role in the Holocaust ==
Activities within Nazi Germany superintended by the RSHA included gathering intelligence, criminal investigation, overseeing foreigners, monitoring public opinion, and Nazi indoctrination. The RSHA was also "the central office for the extra-judicial NS (National Socialist) measures of terror and repression from the beginning of the war until 1945". The list of persecuted people included Jews, Communists, Freemasons, pacifists, and Christian activists.

In addition to dealing with identified enemies, the RSHA advocated expansionist policies for the Reich and the Germanization of additional territory through settlement. After France's defeat in June 1940, it was the RSHA that was tasked with facilitating the proposed Madagascar Plan; the plan called for forcibly relocating 4 million Jewish deportees to the island of Madagascar, over a four-year period. The Madagascar Plan also required France to cede the island to Germany so the Nazis could create a "superghetto" overseen by the SiPo. By mid-August, the RSHA finalized a plan to deport four million Jews to Madagascar, using two ships per day. Eichmann and his team detailed procedures for registering Jews, confiscating their property to fund the operation, and establishing the island as an SS-controlled open-air prison without Jewish self-governance. The RSHA's promotion of the Madagascar Plan in mid-1940 led to the temporary suspension of ghettoization efforts in Poland, as Nazi officials anticipated deporting Jews overseas. However, Britain's refusal to surrender, the cancellation of Operation Sea Lion, and with Germany's inability to control the sea-lanes, the plan was unfeasible. Also, the RSHA estimated it would take some four years to transport all the Jews to Africa's east coast. As a result, the Nazi regime, unable to remove Jews from Europe, increasingly resorted to harsher internal measures under conditions shaped more by wartime strategic realities than by ideological consistency. New opportunities to relocate the Jews elsewhere consequent the invasion of the Soviet Union also led Hitler to decide against Madagascar in favor of sending them to the East.

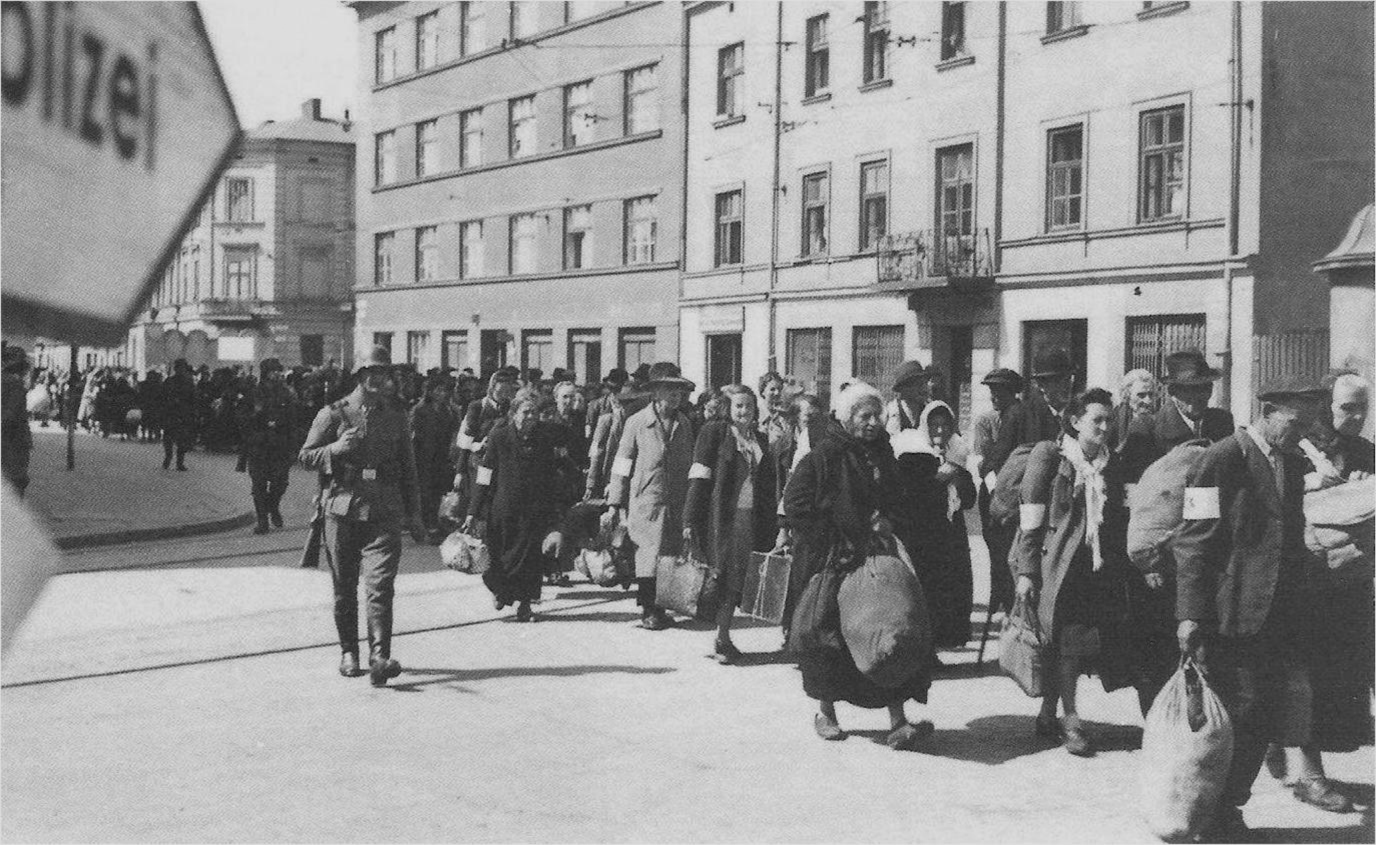
SS guards overseeing Jews being rounded up in March 1943 during the liquidation of the Krakow Ghetto

Generalplan Ost (General Plan East), the secret Nazi plan to colonize Central and Eastern Europe exclusively with Germans—displacing inhabitants in the process through genocide and ethnic cleansing in order to obtain sufficient Lebensraum—also stemmed from officials in the RSHA, among other Nazi organizations. To this end, the RSHA, particularly through the Einsatzgruppen and Gestapo, orchestrated the systematic murder of Slavic populations, Jews, and other "undesirable" groups, clearing the way for German settlers by overseeing forced labor, starvation policies, and mass executions. Additionally, the RSHA's intelligence and planning divisions collaborated with the SS and other agencies to classify populations, determined who would be Germanized or exterminated, and coordinated genocidal policies, making it a key participant in Nazi racial imperialism.

In its role as the national and Nazi security service, the RSHA coordinated activities among various agencies with wide-ranging responsibilities within the Reich. According to German historian, Klaus Hildebrand, the RSHA was "particularly concerned with racial matters". Adolf Eichmann stated in 1937 that "the anger of the people expressed in riots [was] the most effective means to rob the Jews of a sense of security". Entry into the Second World War afforded the RSHA the power to act as an intermediary in conquered or occupied territories, which according to Hans Mommsen, lent itself to implementing the extermination of Jewish populations in those places. An order issued by the RSHA on 20 May 1941 to block emigration of any and all Jews attempting to leave Belgium or France as part of the "imminent Final Solution of the Jewish question" demonstrates its complicity for the systematic extermination of Jews. By November 1941, the RSHA had delivered three gas vans to the Chełmno extermination camp and within a month (8 December 1941) the Nazi's mass murder campaign using gas began.

Part of the RSHA's efforts to encourage occupied nations to hand over their Jews included coercing them by assigning Jewish advisory officials. Working with Eichmann's Reich Association of Jews in Germany, they deliberately deceived Jews still living in Germany and other countries by promising them good living quarters, medical care, and food in Theresienstadt (a camp which was a way station to facilities like Auschwitz) if they turned over their assets to the RSHA through a fictitious home-purchase plan. Systematic mass deportations of Jews to Auschwitz thus began in late March 1942 and were supervised by Eichmann, whose RSHA office was responsible for Jewish affairs and evacuations, the man Heydrich called his "expert" concerning the transportation of Jews to occupied Poland. These transports to Auschwitz came from all over occupied Europe but started with Jews from Slovakia and France. Within the RSHA, Eichmann employed techniques such as deliberate gaps in documentation and strategic ambiguity to deflect accountability. These same methods resurfaced during his trial, where he deliberately confused legal proceedings to evade a clear judgment of his personal culpability. His role in the RSHA also highlights the organization's systemic approach to deception, manipulation, and the weaponization of bureaucracy as a tool of mass murder.

It was to the leaders of the RSHA specifically—comprised by the top brass of the SS (most prominently Heydrich at first)—that reports about the murders and/or evacuation of Jews were sent. In January 1942, Heydrich sent SS-Oberführer Emanuel Schäfer to Serbia, who later (June 1942) "reported with pride" to the RSHA how Serbia was "now free of Jews" after having overseen the murder of some 17,000 persons. From March 1942 through November 1943, the horrific endeavor Operation Reinhard commenced under the RSHA's oversight, whereby they established extermination camps at Belzec, Sobibor, and Treblinka, which resulted in the systematic murder of approximately 1.7 million Jews.

=== Wannsee Conference ===
The Wannsee Conference, held on 20 January 1942, in a villa in Berlin's affluent suburb of Wannsee, was a pivotal meeting in the Nazi regime's bureaucratic machinery of genocide, comprised by "representatives from the RSHA and state secretaries and other officials from the ministerial bureaucracy". Convened by RSHA chief, Reinhard Heydrich, the meeting brought together fifteen high-ranking Nazi officials from various government organizations, including the Gestapo, SS, and the civil administration. (Note: Even before the meeting was called, the RSHA had gathered data on the total number of Jews in Europe's various countries for long-term logistical planning purposes.) Among the key topics of discussion was the fate of Mischlinge (people of mixed Jewish and non-Jewish descent) and Jews in mixed marriages. Some officials proposed sterilization, while others argued for direct deportation. The meeting lasted approximately 90 minutes, during which mass murder was spoken of in purely administrative terms, reflecting the dehumanizing efficiency of Nazi policy. Contrary to some misconceptions, the purpose of the conference was not to decide whether to exterminate Europe's Jewish population—that decision had already been made—but to formalize the logistical and administrative details necessary to carry out the "Final Solution to the Jewish question." (Note: As early as 31 July 1941, Hermann Göring had already commissioned Heydrich “to make all the necessary preparations—organizational, technical, and material—for a total solution of the Jewish question throughout the German sphere of influence in Europe.” Former Gestapo office chief in Minsk, Georg Heuser, later testified that before the Wannsee Conference “only eastern Jews” were to be executed while German Jews were supposed to be resettled in the east. He stated that "after the Wannsee Conference, we were told that all Jews were to be liquidated".)

In callous and detached language, Heydrich outlined plans to deport 11 million Jews from both occupied and neutral European countries to the East, where they would be subjected to forced labor under conditions designed to ensure mass death. Those who survived this process would be "treated accordingly," a euphemism for outright extermination in killing centers such as Auschwitz, Treblinka, Belzec, and Sobibor. The Wannsee Protocol, the official record of the meeting according to the RSHA, later became crucial evidence in post-war trials, exposing the role of Nazi bureaucrats in the Holocaust. Historians avow that the conference remains a chilling example of how genocide can be facilitated not just by ideological fervor, but also through cold, technocratic planning by educated officials operating within a modern state apparatus.

=== Oversight of Einsatzgruppen ===
The RSHA also oversaw the Einsatzgruppen, death squads that were formed under the direction of Heydrich and operated by the SS. Originally part of the SiPo, in September 1939 the operational control of the Einsatzgruppen was taken over by the RSHA. Men for the Einsatzgruppen were drawn from the RSHA's Security Police, SD, Gestapo, Kripo, Orpo, and Waffen-SS. Heydrich and Bruno Streckenbach, head of personnel at the RSHA, personally selected Einsatzgruppen leaders from these units. These committed Nazis and antisemitic ideologues were highly educated, often holding doctorates in law, and had years of experience in policing and security. Their first missions were conducted during early territorial expansions (Austria, Sudetenland, Bohemia-Moravia) to target political opponents, when the Einsatzgruppen units followed the invasion forces of the German Army into Eastern Europe. Although designed only as temporary units on their initial use, these RSHA-controlled units became permanent by 1942, with Einsatzgruppen A, B, C, and D becoming notorious for atrocities, especially against Polish intellectuals, whom they systematically arrested or executed based on pre-compiled lists. Additional Einsatzgruppen operated in other regions like North Africa, Croatia, Hungary, and Slovakia, continuing their role in political repression and genocide. Not infrequently, commanders of Einsatzgruppen and Einsatzkommando sub-units were also desk officers from the main office of the RSHA. Historian Raul Hilberg estimates that between 1941 and 1945 the Einsatzgruppen, related agencies, and foreign auxiliary troops co-opted by the Nazis, (Note: Hilberg outlines the participation of non-German auxiliaries assigned to the Orpo and Einsatzgruppen in these killing operations within his work, Perpetrators, Victims, Bystanders: The Jewish Catastrophe, 1933–1945. He also discusses the overall complicity of non-German governments.) killed more than two million people, including 1.3 million Jews.

== Rosenstrasse protest and RSHA involvement ==
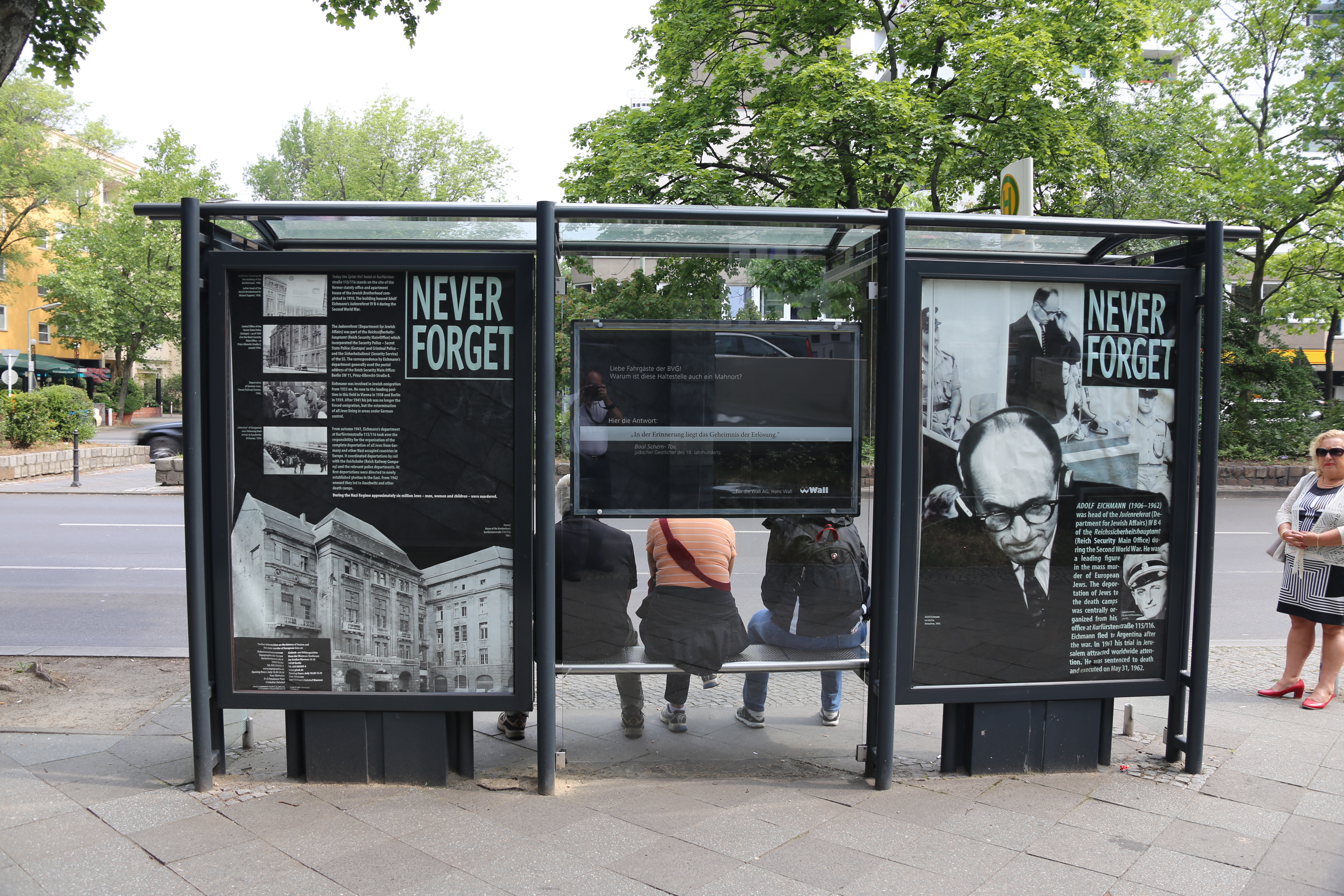
Display on bus stop at the site of Adolf Eichmann's former office in Berlin at Kurfurstenstrasse 115 (now occupied by a hotel building). After the founding of the RSHA in 1939, Eichmann became director of RSHA sub-section (Referat) IV D 4 (Clearing Activities, or Räumungsangelegenheiten) (1940), and, after March 1941, IV B 4 (Jewish Affairs, or Judenreferat). Both offices organized the deportation of Jews. From this position, Eichmann played a central role in transporting over 1.5 million Jews from all over Europe to Nazi killing centers.

As early as 1941, Propaganda Minister Joseph Goebbels began to complain that large numbers of Jews had not been transported out of Germany because of their work in the armaments industry. They were protected from deportation as they were considered to be irreplaceable labourers, and many were also married to Aryan Germans. These Jews believed that these factors ensured their safety. But by late 1942, Hitler and the RSHA were ready to rid Berlin of its remaining German Jews. In September 1942, Hitler decided that these labourers would still be protected, but that they were to be sent out of the country. Meanwhile, Auschwitz administrators were lobbying the government to send them more armaments workers, as they had struck a bargain with the arms producer IG Farben to construct a camp specifically for arms development using slave labour. As a result, the RSHA decreed the Fabrik-Aktion, an initiative to register all Jews working in armaments production. The primary targets of this action were Jews who were married to Aryans.

The RSHA planned to remove all German Jews from Berlin in early 1943 (the deadline to deport these Jews was 28 February 1943, according to a diary entry Goebbels wrote in early February). On 27 February 1943, the RSHA sent plainclothes Gestapo officials to arrest intermarried Jews and charge them with various crimes. Around 2,000 intermarried Jewish men were taken to Rosenstrasse 2–4, where they were held. Goebbels complained that many of the arrests had been "thwarted" by industrialists since some 4,000 Jews were expected to be detained. Angry wives—as "Women of German blood"—began protesting against this action in front of the building on Rosenstrasse where the men were being held. On 6 March, all but 25 of the intermarried Jews were released; the 25 still held were sent to Auschwitz. On 8 March, RSHA head Ernst Kaltenbrunner told Interior Minister Wilhelm Frick that the deportations had been limited to Jews who were not intermarried.

== Post-war accountability ==
After the fall of Nazi Germany in 1945, the Allied powers sought to hold accountable those responsible for the crimes of Nazi Germany through the creation of an international court. Although the RSHA was not tried as an individual entity at the International Military Tribunal (IMT) in Nuremberg, its constituent branches—the Gestapo, Sicherheitsdienst (SD), and SS—were all declared criminal organisations. Because the RSHA effectively centralized these agencies under one bureaucratic and operational umbrella, this ruling meant that many of its personnel were liable for prosecution simply by virtue of their involvement, unless they could prove they were coerced or unaware of the organization's crimes.

One of the highest-ranking RSHA officials to face justice was Ernst Kaltenbrunner, who led the RSHA from 1943 until the war's end in Europe. As Heydrich's successor, Kaltenbrunner was deeply involved in orchestrating the Final Solution, overseeing the activities of concentration camps and directing the Einsatzgruppen—mobile killing squads responsible for mass executions in Eastern Europe—even though he tried to present himself as a sacrificial lamb for Himmler. Despite attempts during his trial to minimize his role or claim ignorance, the tribunal found substantial evidence linking him directly to numerous atrocities. He was found guilty of war crimes, crimes against humanity, and was executed by hanging on 16 October 1946.

Beyond Kaltenbrunner's conviction, the subsequent Nuremberg Trials (1947–1949) brought additional RSHA personnel to justice. Particularly notable was the Einsatzgruppen Trial, in which 24 senior commanders of these killing units were prosecuted. Responsible for the deaths of over a million civilians—primarily Jews—these men were among the most direct perpetrators of the Holocaust. This trial, led by Chief Prosecutor Benjamin Ferencz, became a landmark in the development of international criminal law, establishing genocide and crimes against humanity as prosecutable offenses. Fourteen defendants received death sentences, though only four were carried out. In the RuSHA Trial, RSHA officials involved in racial policy, Germanization, and child abduction programs were also held to account, further highlighting the role of RSHA bureaucracies in violating international norms.

Many RSHA members avoided prosecution altogether, particularly as Cold War tensions soon overshadowed the postwar justice effort. In West Germany, the denazification process faltered, and numerous mid-level RSHA officials were reintegrated into civil service or intelligence agencies, such as the newly formed Bundesnachrichtendienst (BND). East Germany, by contrast, made more frequent public use of RSHA crimes in its political rhetoric but often prosecuted only a limited number of individuals, dropping to as few as 23 person by 1955, and just one person each in 1957 and 1958. The overall result was an uneven application of justice, with only a fraction of RSHA personnel ever facing legal consequences; in some cases, figures high in the RSHA hierarchy were given minimal sentences, such as known perpetrator SS-Standartenführer (Colonel) Walter Huppenkothen, who was a directorate chief in the RSHA headquarters that only served three years of a six-year sentence.

Nevertheless, the trials of RSHA officials—especially Kaltenbrunner and the Einsatzgruppen leaders—had lasting legal and moral significance. They helped define the concepts of crimes against humanity and bureaucratic complicity in mass murder. Furthermore, they exposed how the machinery of genocide relied not just on fanatics or frontline perpetrators, but on administrators, planners, and technocrats—figures who, through paperwork and procedure, made industrial-scale murder possible. The legacy of these proceedings continues to influence international law and collective memory to this day.

== See also ==
- Glossary of Nazi Germany
- List of SS personnel
- OVRA – Fascist Italy's secret police, similar to the Gestapo
- SS-Wirtschafts-Verwaltungshauptamt (WVHA, the economic & administrative department of the SS)
- Red Orchestra – RSHA operations against a wartime Soviet espionage ring.
