= Sicherheitspolizei =

State security police of Nazi Germany

Security Police
- Sicherheitspolizei (SiPo)
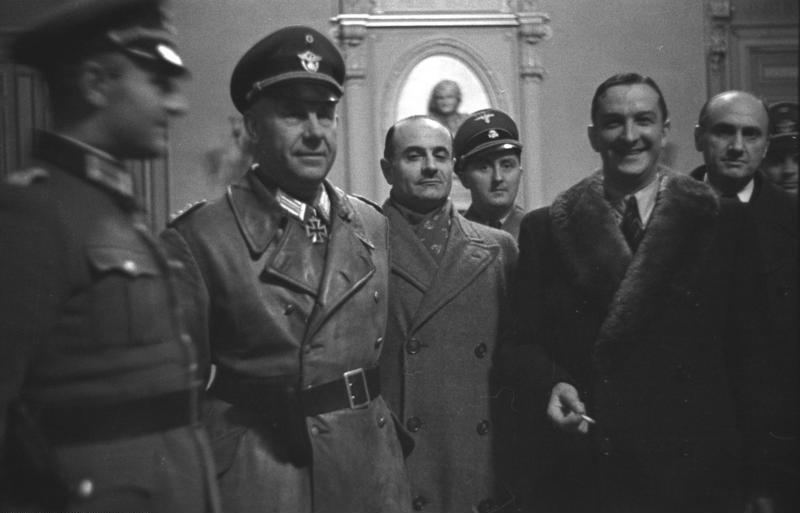
- SiPo officers in Marseille during World War II

Agency overview
- Formed: 26 June 1936
- Preceding agency: Gestapo and Kripo
- Dissolved: 22 September 1939
- Superseding agency: Reich Security Main Office (RSHA)
- Type: security police and criminal police combined
- Jurisdiction: Germany; Occupied Europe
- Headquarters: Prinz-Albrecht-Straße, Berlin
- Employees: 245,000 (1940)
- Ministers responsible: Wilhelm Frick (nominal authority) 1936–1939, Interior Minister; Heinrich Himmler 1936–1939, Chef der Deutschen Polizei
- Agency executive: SS-Gruppenführer Reinhard Heydrich 1936–1939, Director, SiPo and Gestapo

The Sicherheitspolizei often abbreviated as SiPo, is a German term meaning "security police". In the Nazi era, it referred to the state political and criminal investigation security agencies. It was made up by the combined forces of the Gestapo (secret state police) and the Kriminalpolizei (criminal police; Kripo) between 1936 and 1939. As a formal agency, the SiPo was incorporated into the Reich Security Main Office (RSHA) in 1939, but the term continued to be used informally until the end of World War II in Europe.

== Origins ==
The term originated in August 1919 when the Reichswehr set up the Sicherheitswehr as a militarised police force to take action during times of riots or strikes. Owing to limitations in army numbers, it was renamed the Sicherheitspolizei to avoid attention. They wore a green uniform, and were sometimes called the "Green Police". It was a military body, recruiting largely from the Freikorps, with NCOs and officers from the old Imperial German Army.

== Nazi era ==
Standard for the chief of SiPo

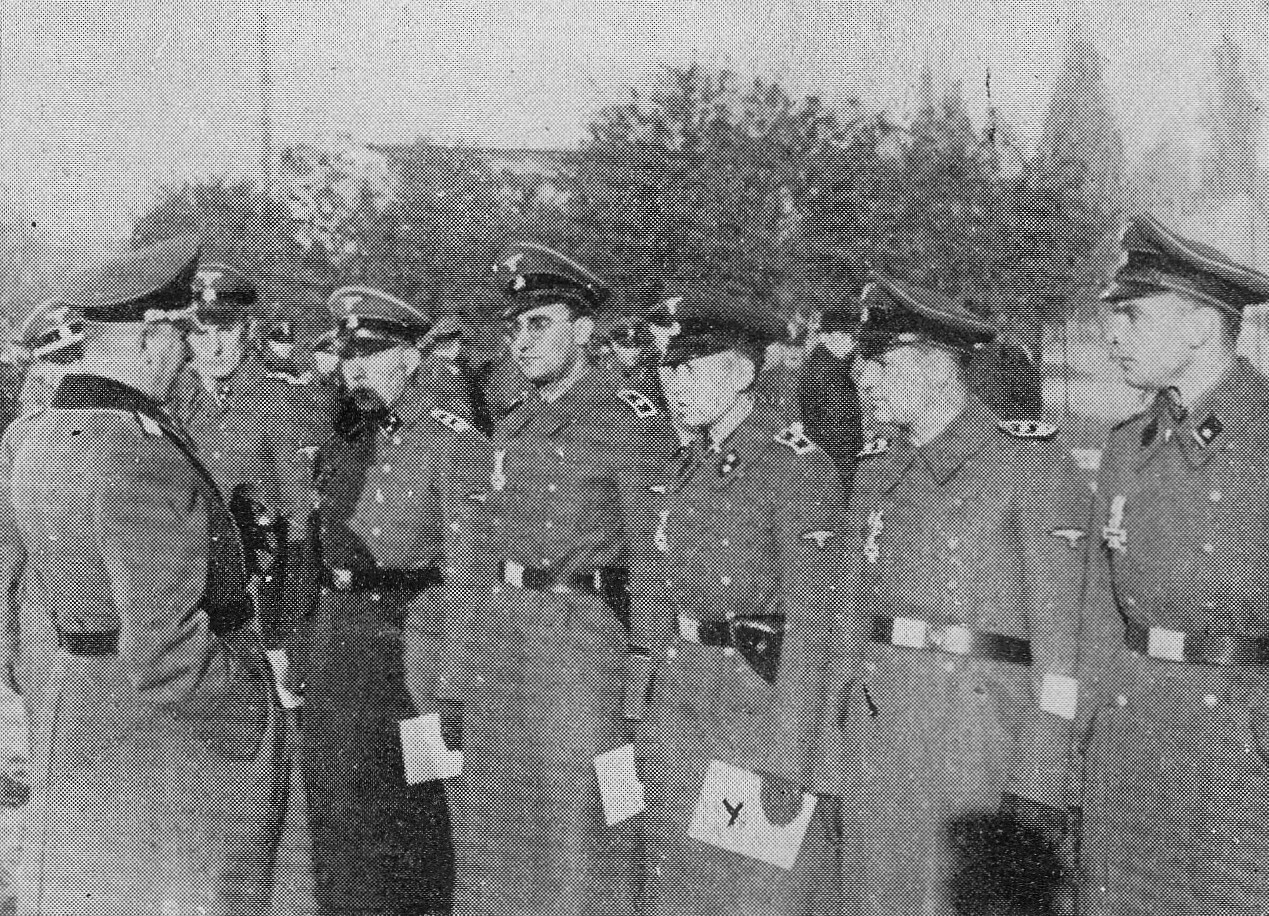
SiPo officers in occupied Warsaw

When the Nazis came to national power in 1933, Germany, as a federal state, had myriad local and centralized police agencies, which often were un-coordinated and had overlapping jurisdictions. Heinrich Himmler and Reinhard Heydrich's plan was to fully absorb all the police and security apparatus into the structure of the Schutzstaffel (SS). To this end, Himmler first took command of the Gestapo (itself developed from the Prussian Secret Police). Then on 17 June 1936 all police forces throughout Germany were united, following Adolf Hitler's appointment of Himmler as Chef der Deutschen Polizei (Chief of German Police). As such he was nominally subordinate to Interior Minister Wilhelm Frick, but in practice Himmler answered only to Hitler.

Himmler immediately reorganised the police, with the state agencies statutorily divided into two groups: the Ordnungspolizei (Order Police; Orpo), consisting of both the national uniformed police and the municipal police, and the Sicherheitspolizei (Security Police; SiPo), consisting of the Kripo and Gestapo. Heydrich was appointed chief of the SiPo and was already head of the party Sicherheitsdienst (Security Service; SD) and the Gestapo. The two police branches were commonly known as the Orpo and SiPo (Kripo and Gestapo combined), respectively.

The idea was to fully identify and integrate the party agency (SD) with the state agency (SiPo). Most of the SiPo members were encouraged or volunteered to become members of the SS and many held a rank in both organisations. Nevertheless, in practice there was jurisdictional overlap and operational conflict between the SD and Gestapo. The Kripo kept a level of independence since its structure was longer-established. Himmler founded the Hauptamt Sicherheitspolizei in order to create a centralized main command office under Heydrich's overall command of the SiPo.

The Einsatzgruppen were formed under the direction of Heydrich and operated by the SS under the SiPo and SD. The Einsatzgruppen had its origins in the ad hoc Einsatzkommando formed by Heydrich to secure government buildings and documents following the Anschluss in Austria in March 1938. Originally part of the SiPo, two units of Einsatzgruppen were stationed in the Sudetenland in October 1938. When military action turned out not to be necessary because of the Munich Agreement, the Einsatzgruppen were assigned to confiscate government papers and police documents. They also secured government buildings, questioned senior civil servants, and arrested as many as 10,000 Czech communists and German citizens.

== Merger ==
In September 1939, with the founding of the Reich Security Main Office (Reichssicherheitshauptamt; RSHA), the Sicherheitspolizei as a functioning state agency ceased to exist as the department was merged into the RSHA. Further, the RSHA obtained overall command of the Einsatzgruppen units from that time forward. Members of the Einsatzgruppen units at this point were drawn from the SS, the SD and the police. They were used during the invasion of Poland to forcefully de-politicise the Polish people and murder members of groups most clearly identified with Polish national identity: the intelligentsia, members of the clergy, teachers, and members of the nobility. When the units were re-formed prior to the invasion of the Soviet Union in 1941, the men of the Einsatzgruppen were recruited from the SD, Gestapo, Kripo, Orpo and Waffen-SS. These mobile death squads were active in the implementation of the Final Solution in the territories overrun by the Nazi forces.

== See also ==
- Glossary of Nazi Germany
- Police forces of Nazi Germany
