= Czech exonyms =

The following is a list of Czech exonyms, Czech names for places that do not speak Czech that differ from the name used locally or officially. Many are native names from ancient times that are no longer used in the native language. Note that a large number of the names on the list below are archaic – no longer in use in contemporary Czech.

Exonyms should not be confused with romanization, i.e., transliteration of names using a different script into a variant of the Latin alphabet according to a given set of rules. The Czech language usually employs different romanization systems than English (for example, the standard Czech romanization of the Chinese name 青岛 is Čching-tao, as opposed to its Hanyu Pinyin transliteration Qīngdǎo or to Wade–Giles Ch'ing-tao).

Language	English or native name	Czech exonym
Albania Albánie
Albanian	Berat	Albánský Bělehrad
Albanian	Durrës	Drač
Albanian	Fushë-Krujë	Krujské Pole
Albanian	Gjirokastër	Džirokastr
Albanian	Shkodër	Skadar
Algeria Alžírsko
Arabic	الجزائر (al-Jazā'ir/al-Džazá'ir)	Alžír
Arabic	وهران (Wahrān/Wahrán)	Oran
Armenia Arménie
Armenian	Երեւան (Erevan)	Jerevan
Austria Rakousko (Note: The Czech name "comes from a medieval castle on the Austro-Czech border called Radgos, which is today known as Raabs. The Czechs used the name of the castle for the whole country and called it Rakuš or Rakus, which eventually became Rakousko.")
German		List of Czech exonyms for places in Austria
Belarus Bělorusko
Belarusian – Russian	Гроднa (Hrodna) – Гроднo (Grodno)	Hrodno
Belarusian – Russian	Навагрудак (Navahrudak) − Новогрудок (Novogrudok)	Novogrodek
Belarusian – Russian	Заслаўе (Zaslawye/Zaslauje) − Заславль (Zaslavl')	Zaslav, Záslaví
Belgium Belgie
French – Dutch	Anvers – Antwerpen	Antverpy
French – Dutch	Bruges – Brugge	Bruggy
French – Dutch	Louvain – Leuven	Lovaň
French – Dutch	Liège – Luik	Lutych
Bulgaria Bulharsko
Bulgarian	Търговище (Tǎrgovište)	Trhoviště
China Čína
Mandarin Chinese – Uyghur	北京 (Běijīng/Pej-ťing)	Peking
Mandarin Chinese – Uyghur	广州 (Guǎngzhōu/Kuang-čou)	Kanton
Mandarin Chinese – Uyghur	哈尔滨 (Hārbīn/Cha-er-pin)	Charbin
Mandarin Chinese – Uyghur	喀什 (Kāshí/Kcha-š') – قەشقەر (Qeshqer/Kešker)	Kašgar
Mandarin Chinese – Uyghur	南京 (Nánjīng/Nan-ťing)	Nanking
Mandarin Chinese – Uyghur	莎车 (Shāchē/Ša-čche) – يەكەن (Yeken/Jeken)	Jarkand
Croatia Chorvatsko
Croatian	Zagreb	Záhřeb
Cuba Kuba
Spanish	La Habana	Havana
Cyprus Kypr
Greek – Turkish	Λευκωσία (Lefkosía/Lefkósia) – Lefkoşa	Nikósie
Denmark Dánsko
Danish	København	Kodaň
Egypt Egypt
Arabic	الإسكندرية (al-Iskandariyya/al-Iskandaríja)	Alexandrie
Arabic	الغردقة (al-Ghardaqah/al-Ghardaka)	Hurghada
Arabic	الأقصر (al-Uqṣur/al-Uksur)	Luxor
Arabic	السويس (as-Suways/as-Suwajs)	Suez
Estonia Estonsko
Estonian	Pärnu	Pernava
Estonian	Viljandi	Vilín
Finland Finsko
France Francie
French	Crécy-en-Ponthieu	Kresčak
French	Lourdes	Lurdy
French	Metz	Mety
French	Paris	Paříž
French	Reims	Remeš
French	Strasbourg	Štrasburk
Germany Německo (Note: "This comes from the Czech adjective němý, which means mute. This term was originally used for all foreigners, as they could not speak Czech, and were thus essentially mute.")
German		List of Czech exonyms for places in Germany
Greece Řecko
Greek	Αθήνα (Athína/Athina)	Athény
Greek	Κέρκυρα (Kérkyra/Kerkyra)	Korfu
Greek	Κόρινθος (Kórinthos/Korinthos)	Korint
Greek	Ιωάννινα (Ioánnina/Ióannina)	Janina
Greek	Πειραιάς (Peiraiás/Piraeus)	Pireus
Greek	Θεσσαλονίκη (Thessaloníki/Thessaloniki)	Soluň
Greek	Θήβα (Thíva/Thiva)	Théby
Hungary Maďarsko (Note: Uhersko is an archaic name for Hungary. It can still be seen used in places such as Uherské Hradiště and Uherský Brod in Moravia.)
Hungarian	Budapest, Buda	Budapešť, Budín
Hungarian	Debrecen	Debrecín
Hungarian	Dunaújváros	Dunajské Nové Město
Hungarian	Esztergom	Ostřihom
Hungarian	Gödöllő	Jedlová
Hungarian	Győr	Ráb
Hungarian	Kisvárda	Malý Varadín
Hungarian	Miskolc	Miškovec
Hungarian	Mosonmagyaróvár	Uherské Staré Hrady
Hungarian	Nagykanizsa	Velká Kaniža
Hungarian	Pécs	Pětikostelí
Hungarian	Salgótarján	Šalgov-Tarjany
Hungarian	Sopron	Šoproň
Hungarian	Szeged	Segedín
Hungarian	Székesfehérvár	Stoličný Bělehrad
Hungarian	Szombathely	Kamenec
Hungarian	Vác	Vacov
India Indie
Gujarati – English	અમદાવાદ (Amdāvād/Amdávád) – Ahmedabad	Ahmadábád
Bengali	কলকাতা (Kolkata)	Kalkata
Marathi – English	मुंबई (Mumbaī/Mumbaí) – Mumbai	Bombaj
Hindi – English	बनारस (Banāras/Banáras) – Varanasi	Varanásí
Israel Izrael
Hebrew – Arabic	יפו (Yafo/Jafo) - ݐافا (Yāfā/Yáfá)	Jaffa
Hebrew – Arabic	ירושלים (Yerushaláyim/Jerušalajim) – القُدس (al-Quds/al-Kuds)	Jeruzalém
Hebrew – Arabic	נצרת (Natzrát/Nacrat) – الناصرة (an-Nāsira/an-Násira)	Nazaret
Hebrew – Arabic	טבריה (Tverya/Tverja) – طبرية (Ṭabariyyah/Tabarija)	Tiberias
Iraq Irák
Arabic – Kurdish	الموصل (al-Mawsil/al-Mausíl) – Mûsil	Mosul
Italy Itálie (Note: Vlašsko is an archaic name for Italy. It can still be seen used in places such as the Italian Court (Vlašský dvůr) in Kutná Hora.)
Italian	Florence (Italian: Firenze)	Florencie
Italian	Genoa (Genova)	Janov
Italian	Gorizia	Gorice
Italian	Milan (Milano)	Milán
Italian	Naples (Napoli)	Neapol
Italian	Pompeii	Pompeje
Italian	Rome (Roma)	Řím
Italian	Syracuse (Siracusa)	Syrakusy
Italian	Taranto	Tarent
Italian	Turin (Torino)	Turín
Italian	Trento	Trident
Italian	Trieste	Terst
Italian	Venice (Venezia)	Benátky
Ivory Coast Pobřeží slonoviny
Japan Japonsko
Japanese	東京 (Tōkyō/Tókjó)	Tokio
Laos Laos
Lao	ວຽງຈັນ (Viang-chan/?)	Vientiane
Latvia Lotyšsko
Latvian	Cēsis	Venden
Latvian	Daugavpils	Dvinohrad
Latvian	Liepāja	Libava
Latvian	Rēzekne	Režica
Latvian	Ventspils	Vindava
Lebanon Libanon
Libya Libye
Arabic	طرابلس (Ṭarābulus/Tarábulus)	Tripolis
Lithuania Litva
Lithuanian	Alytus	Olita
Lithuanian	Jonava	Janovo
Lithuanian	Kaunas	Kovno
Lithuanian	Panevėžys	Panevézy, Ponevěž
Lithuanian	Šiauliai	Šavli
Lithuanian	Trakai	Troky
Lithuanian	Vilnius	Vilno
Luxembourg Lucembursko
German	Diekirch	Kostelec
German	Luxemburg	Lucemburk
Moldova Moldavsko
Romanian	Bălți	Bělce
Romanian	Chișinău	Kišiněv
Montenegro Černá Hora
Morocco Maroko
Arabic	فاس (Fās/Fás)	Fez
Arabic	مكناس (Maknās/Maknás)	Meknes
Arabic	مراكش (Murrākush/Murrákuš)	Marrákeš
Arabic	وجدة (Wajda/Wadžda)	Udžda
Arabic	طنجة (Ṭanja/Tandža)	Tanger
Palestine Palestina
Arabic – Hebrew	بيت لحم (Bait Lahm/Bajt Lahm) – בית לחם (Beit Lehem/Bejt Lechem)	Betlém
Arabic – Hebrew	الخليل (al-Khalīl/al-Chalíl) – חברון (Hevron/Chevron)	Hebron
Arabic – Hebrew	ٲرݐحا (Arīhā/Aríhá) - יריחו (Yeriho)	Jericho
Arabic – Hebrew	نابلس (Nāblus/Náblus) – שכם (Shkhem/Šchem)	Nábulus
Poland Polsko
Polish	Białogard	Bělehrad
Polish	Bielsko-Biała	Bílsko-Bělá
Polish	Baborów	Bavorov
Polish	Bogdanowice	Bohdanovice
Polish	Bolesławiec	Boleslav
Polish	Brzeg	Břeh
Polish	Bydgoszcz	Bydhošť
Polish	Bystrzyca Kłodzka	Kladská Bystřice
Polish	Chełmno	Chlumno
Polish	Chełmża	Chlumže
Polish	Chomiąża	Chomýž
Polish	Częstochowa	Čenstochová
Polish	Drezdenko	Drezno
Polish	Duszniki Zdrój	Dušníky
Polish	Gdynia	Gdyně
Polish	Gliwice	Hlivice
Polish	Głogów	Hlohov
Polish	Głogówek	Horní Hlohov
Polish	Głubczyce	Hlubčice
Polish	Głuchołazy	Hlucholazy
Polish	Gniezno	Hnězdno
Polish	Grodków	Hrádek
Polish	Gubin	Hubno
Polish	Inowrocław	Inovroclav, Mladá Vratislav
Polish	Jawor	Javory
Polish	Jelenia Góra	Jelení Hora
Polish	Kędzierzyn-Koźle	Kandřín-Kozlí
Polish	Kietrz	Ketř
Polish	Kluczbork	Klučborek
Polish	Kołobrzeg	Kolobřeh
Polish	Koszalin	Kozlín
Polish	Kostrzyn nad Odrą	Kostřín
Polish	Krasne Pole	Krásne Loučky
Polish	Kudowa-Zdrój	Lázně Chudoba
Polish	Lądek-Zdrój	Lázně Landek
Polish	Legnica	Lehnice
Polish	Lidzbark Warmiński	Lizberk
Polish	Lisięcice	Lištice
Polish	Międzylesie	Mezilesí
Polish	Mieroszów	Frýdlant ve Slezsku
Polish	Nowa Cerekwia	Nová Cerekev
Polish	Nowy Sącz	Nový Sadec
Polish	Oleśnica	Olešnice
Polish	Opole	Opolí
Polish	Oświęcim	Osvětim
Polish	Pielgrzymów	Pelhřimovy
Polish	Pszczyna	Pština
Polish	Racibórz	Ratiboř
Polish	Sandomierz	Sandoměř
Polish	Słupsk	Sloup
Polish	Sopot	Sopoty
Polish	Środa Śląska	Slezská Středa
Polish	Stara Lomnica	Stará Lomnice na Kladsku
Polish	Świnoujście	Svinoústí
Polish	Szczecin	Štětín
Polish	Szczecinek	Nový Štětín
Polish	Szklarska Poręba	Sklářská Poruba
Polish	Tarnowskie Góry	Tarnovice
Polish	Wambierzyce	Vambeřice
Polish	Włodzienin	Vladěnín
Polish	Wojnowice	Vojanovice
Polish	Wrocław	Vratislav
Polish	Żagań	Zaháň
Polish	Żary	Žarov
Polish	Zgorzelec	Zhořelec
Polish	Ziębice	Minstrberk
Polish	Zielona Góra	Zelená Hora
Polish	Złoty Stok	Rychleby
Portugal Portugalsko
Portuguese	Lisbon (Lisboa)	Lisabon
Romania Rumunsko
Romanian	Alba Iulia	Karlovský Bělehrad
Romanian	Baia Mare	Velký Důl
Romanian	Baia Nouă	Nové Doly
Romanian	Botoșani	Botušany
Romanian	Bozovici	Božovice
Romanian	Brașov	Brašov
Romanian	Cluj-Napoca	Kluž
Romanian	Eșelnița	Ješelnice
Romanian	Iablanița	Jablonice
Romanian	Iași	Jasy
Romanian	Liubcova	Lubková
Romanian	Oradea	Velký Varadín
Romanian	Orșova	Oršava
Romanian	Piatra Neamț	Moldavský Kamenec
Romanian	Satu Mare	Velká Vesnice
Romanian	Sibiu	Sibiň
Romanian	Sighetu Marmației	Marmarošská Sihoť
Romanian	Sighișoara	Segešvár, Šigišov
Romanian	Șopotu Nou	Bušava
Romanian	Târgoviște	Trhoviště
Romanian	Timișoara	Temešvár
Russia Rusko
Russian	Калининград (Kaliningrad)	Kaliningrad, Královec
Russian	Орёл (Oryol)	Orel
Russian	(Sankt Peterburg)	Petrohrad
Russian	Советск (Sovetsk)	Sovětsk/Tylže
Saudi Arabia Saúdská Arábie
Arabic	المدينة المنورة (al-Madīnah al-Munawwarah/al-Madína al-Munawwara)	Medína
Arabic	مكة (Makkah/Makka)	Mekka
Serbia Srbsko
Serbian	Београд, Beograd	Bělehrad
Slovenia Slovinsko
Slovene	Ljubljana	Lublaň
Somalia Somálsko
Somali – Arabic	Muqdisho – مقديشو (Maqadīshū/Makadíšú)	Mogadišu
Somali – Arabic	Hargaysa – هرجيسا (Harjaisā/Hardžajsá)	Hargeysa
South Africa Jihoafrická republika
English – Afrikaans	Cape Town – Kaapstad	Kapské Město
Spain Španělsko
Switzerland Švýcarsko
German – French	Basel – Bâle	Basilej
German – French	Genf – Genève	Ženeva
German – French	Sankt Gallen – Saint-Gall	Svatý Havel
German – French	Sankt Moritz – Saint-Moritz	Svatý Mořic
Syria Sýrie
Arabic	دمشق (Dimashq/Dimašk)	Damašek
Thailand Thajsko
Thai	กรุงเทพฯ (Krung Thep)	Bangkok
Turkey Turecko
Turkish	İzmir	Smyrna
Turkish	İznik	Nikaia
Turkmenistan Turkmenistán
Turkmen	Aşgabat	Ašchabad
Ukraine Ukrajina
Ukrainian	Чернігів (Chernihiv/Černihiv)	Černigov, Černihov
Ukrainian	Чернівці (Chernivtsi/Černivci)	Černovice
Ukrainian	Чорнобиль (Chornobyl/Čornobyl)	Černobyl
Ukrainian	Харків (Kharkiv/Charkiv)	Charkov
Ukrainian	Хотин (Khotyn/Chotyn)	Chotim
Ukrainian	Київ (Kyiv/Kyjiv)	Kyjev
Ukrainian	Кривий Ріг (Krivyi Rih/Kryvyj Rih)	Krivoj Rog
Ukrainian	Львів (Lviv)	Lvov
Ukrainian	Новгород-Сіверський (Novhorod-Siverskyi/Novhorod-Siverskyj)	Novgorod Severský
Ukrainian	Запоріжжя (Zaporizhzhya/Zaporižžja)	Záporoží
United Kingdom Spojené království
English	London	Londýn
United States Spojené státy americké
Uzbekistan Uzbekistán
Uzbek	Toshkent	Taškent
Language	Native name	Czech exonym

== See also ==
- List of European exonyms
