= List of Czech exonyms for places in Austria =

This is a list of Czech language exonyms for places located in Austria.

- Bad Aussee Uže
- Badgastein Gastýn
- Bludenz Bludenec
- Braunau am Inn Brunov
- Bregenz Brežnice
- Bruck an der Leitha Most nad Litavou
- Bruck an der Mur Most nad Murou
- Deutschlandsberg Lonč
- Deutsch Wagram Německý Ogrun
- Donau Dunaj
- Drosendorf-Zissersdorf Drozdov
- Dürnkrut Suché Kruty
- Eisenstadt Železné Město
- Eggenburg Eggenburk
- Enns Enže
- Freistadt Cáhlov
- Geras Jerus
- Gmünd Cmunt
- Graz Štýrský Hradec
- Groß-Siegharts Velké Sighartice
- Heidenreichstein Kamýk
- Hardegg Hardek
- Höflein an der Hohen Wand Horní Hevlín
- Hohenau Cáhnov
- Horn Rohy
- Innsbruck Insbruk, Inšpruk
- Kärnten Korutany
- Klagenfurt Celovec
- Krems Kremže
- Laa an der Thaya Lava nad Dyjí
- Leibniz Lipnice
- Linz Linec
- Litschau Líčov
- Matzen Macno
- Neusiedl am See Nezider
- Niederabsdorf Dolní Opatov
- Niederösterreich Dolní Rakousy
- Oberösterreich Horní Rakousy
- Poysdorf Pušdorf
- Raabs an der Thaya Rakousy nad Dyjí
- Retz Reteč
- Ringelsdorf Střezník
- Salzburg Salcburk, Solnohrad
- Sankt Pölten Svatý Hippolyt
- Schrems Skřemelice
- Schwarzenau Švarcenava
- Spittal an der Drau Špitál nad Drávou
- Stockerau Štokrava
- Steiermark Štýrsko
- Steyr Štýr
- Traun Travna
- Unserfrau-Altweitra Stará Vitoraz
- Villach Bělák
- Völkermarkt Velikovec
- Waidhofen an der Thaya Bejdov nad Dyjí, Český Bejdov
- Waidhofen an der Ybbs Bejdov nad Jivici
- Weitra Vitoraz
- Wien Vídeň
- Wiener Neudorf Vídeňská Nová Ves
- Wiener Neustadt Vídeňské Nové Město
- Ybbs Jivice
- Zistersdorf Čistějov
- Zwettl Světlá

== See also ==
- List of Czech exonyms for places in Germany
- Czech exonyms
- List of European exonyms

== Bibliography ==
- Rank, Josef (1871). Nový slovník kapesní jazyka českého i německého (in Czech and German). Prague.
