= Krasne Pole =

Krasne Pole may refer to:

- Krásné Pole, borough and municipal district of Ostrava, Czech Republic
- Krasne Pole, Głubczyce County, a village in Poland
- Krasne Pole, Markivka Raion, a village in Markivka Raion, Ukraine
