= Rogożany =

- Village
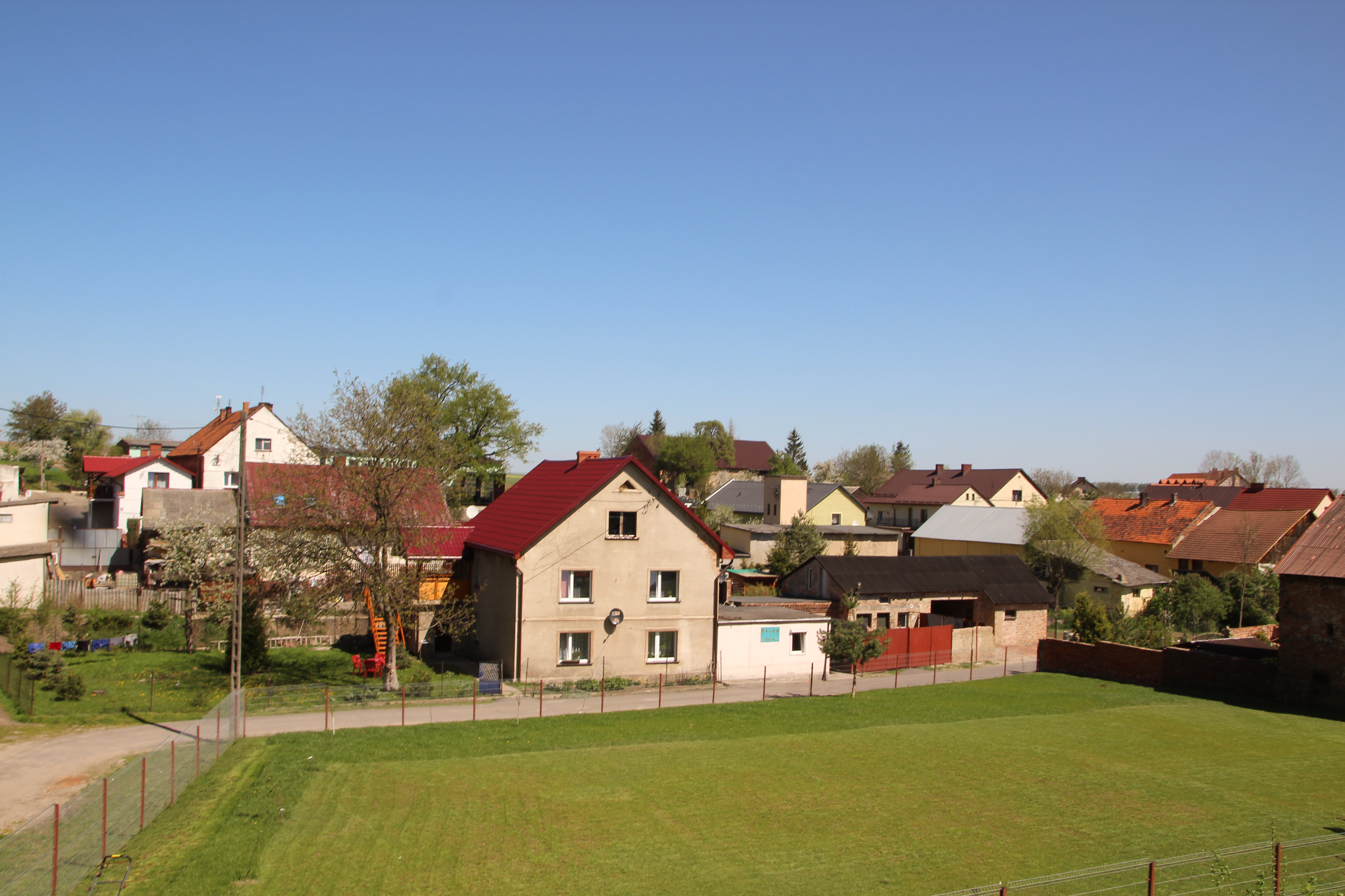

- Location within Poland
- Coordinates: 50°5′31″N 17°54′25″E
- Country: Poland
- Voivodeship: Opole
- County: Głubczyce
- Gmina: Kietrz
- Population: 219 (2,007)

Rogożany [rɔɡɔˈʐanɨ] is a village in the administrative district of Gmina Kietrz, within Głubczyce County, Opole Voivodeship, in south-western Poland, close to the Czech border.
