= Gniewkowice =

- Village
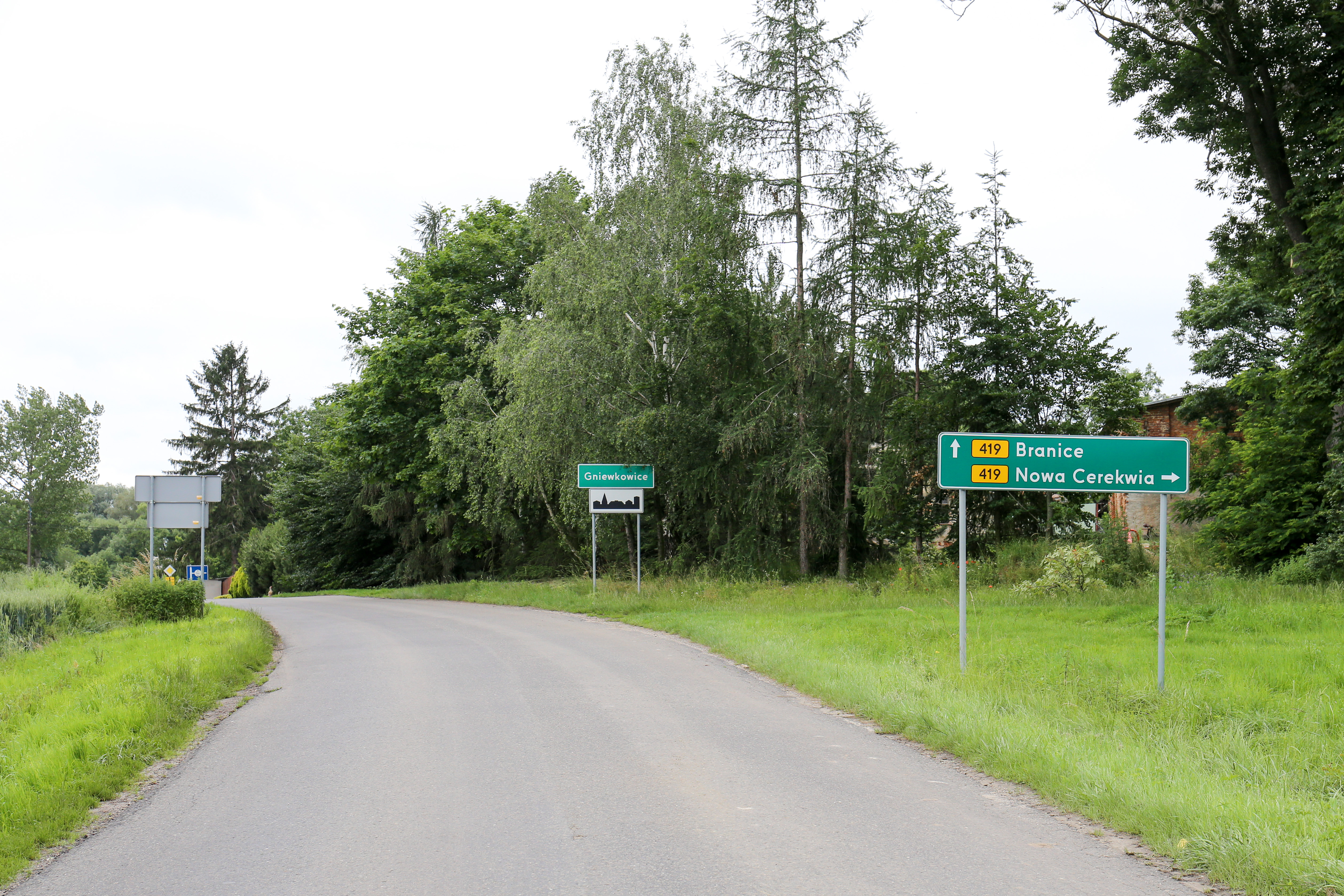

- Location within Poland
- Coordinates: 50°3′34″N 17°55′37″E
- Country: Poland
- Voivodeship: Opole
- County: Głubczyce
- Gmina: Kietrz

Gniewkowice [ɡɲɛfkɔˈvit͡sɛ] (German Annahof) is a village in the administrative district of Gmina Kietrz, within Głubczyce County, Opole Voivodeship, in south-western Poland, close to the Czech border.
