= Angela Zigahl =

German teacher and politician (1885–1955)

Member of the Landtag of Prussia for Oppeln
- In office 1925 – July 1933

Personal details
- Born: 25 December 1885 Dirschel, Kingdom of Prussia, German Empire (now Dzierżysław, Poland)
- Died: 1955 (aged 69–70) Duderstadt, Lower Saxony, West Germany
- Party: Centre Party (until 1933); Uncertain (1933–1954); CDU (1954–1955)
- Education: University of Bonn; Ludwig-Maximilians-Universität München; University of Münster

Angela Zigahl (25 December 1885 – 1955) was a German teacher and politician who served in the Landtag of Prussia from 1925 until 1933. A member of the Centre Party, she represented the Oppeln constituency. Following World War II, Zigahl was a member of the Sonne Commission, an American-led body which sought to resolve the post-war refugee crisis in West Germany.

== Biography ==
Angela Zigahl was born on 25 December 1885 in the town of Dirschel in Upper Silesia, then part of the Kingdom of Prussia within the German Empire. After attending the Bolts School in Dirschel and the lyceum in Ratibor, she began attending the girls school (oberlyzeum) in Duderstadt in the Province of Hanover. She later attended the University of Bonn, the Ludwig-Maximilians-Universität München, and the University of Münster, studying "philosophy, German history, geography, and economics". Zigahl passed her state teaching examinations in 1915, and began teaching at the lyceum in Cologne. She later taught at the girls school in Neisse in Upper Silesia, where she became a studienrätin and educational counselor.

In 1918, Zigahl was elected to the Neisse city council as a member of the Centre Party. She served on the city council until 1925, following her election to the Landtag of Prussia in the previous year's election, representing the Oppeln constituency. A member of the Association of Catholic German Teachers (VkdL), Zigahl primarily supported Catholic positions and promoted the interests of college-educated teachers during her tenure. In 1926, she spoke in support of a bill proposed by the state government which would limit the ability of married female civil servants to continue working in their positions, arguing that the majority of women voluntarily retired upon marriage. She also supported a proposed amendment to the bill which would allow these women to retain their pensions and would protect these positions from being filled by married men. While in the Landtag, Zigahl served on the Officials Committee, and in spring 1933, she was part of a parliamentary group investigating the furloughing of several Centre Party officials from Prussian ministerial offices.

Zigahl was re-elected in the 1928, 1932, and 1933 Prussian elections. She was forced to leave office in July 1933 following the Nazi seizure of power, when the Nazi government barred women from serving in political office. Germania, the official Centre Party newspaper, states that it is unclear if she joined the Nazi Party after leaving office, as many Centre Party officials did when the party was banned later in 1933. A Gestapo dossier on Zigahl states that she retired after leaving office, was not politically active during the Nazi era, and moved to the Charlottenburg neighborhood of Berlin. After World War II, Zigahl was appointed to the Sonne Commission, a 14-member body consisting of nine Americans and five Germans which was part of the Economic Cooperation Administration. Led by American banker Hans Christian Sonne and German sociologist Ludwig Neundörfer, the Sonne Commission was tasked with devising strategies to integrate the large influx of war refugees into West German society. Zigahl was placed in charge of social welfare issues, and led efforts to create jobs for refugee women, particularly mothers, as "an economic stopgap".

By 1954, Zigahl had moved to the town of Fulda in Hesse. Now a member of the Christian Democratic Union, she ran for the Landtag of Hesse in the 1954 election, running as a party list candidate. She was not elected, placing last (17th) in the party lists. Zigahl died in Duderstadt in 1955.
