= Ludmierzyce =

- Village
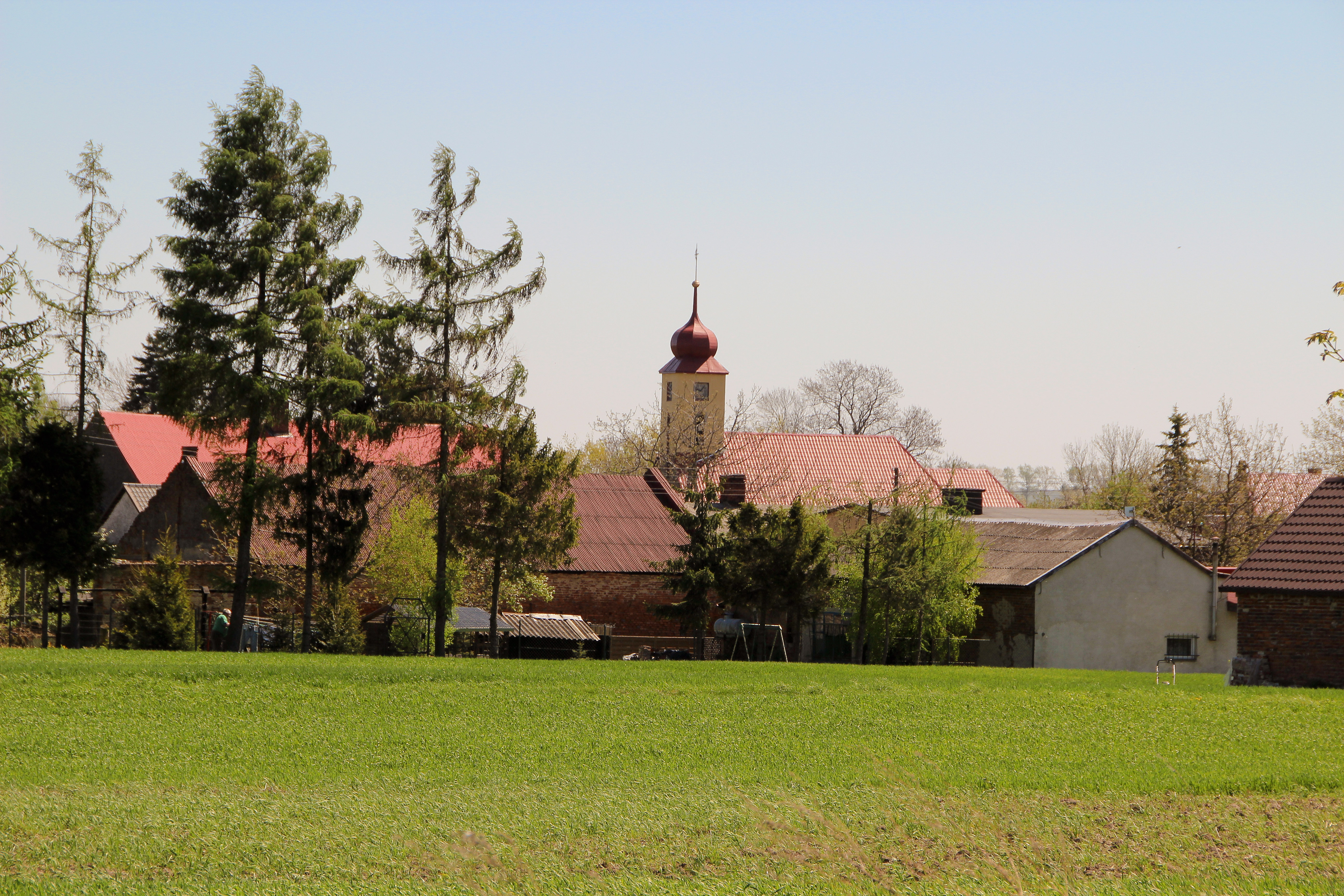

- Location within Poland
- Coordinates: 50°2′N 17°54′E
- Country: Poland
- Voivodeship: Opole
- County: Głubczyce
- Gmina: Kietrz
- Elevation: 279 m (915 ft)
- Population: 127 (2,007)

Ludmierzyce [ludmjɛˈʐɨt͡sɛ] is a village in the administrative district of Gmina Kietrz, within Głubczyce County, Opole Voivodeship, in south-western Poland, close to the Czech border.
