= Nowa Cerekwia =

- Village
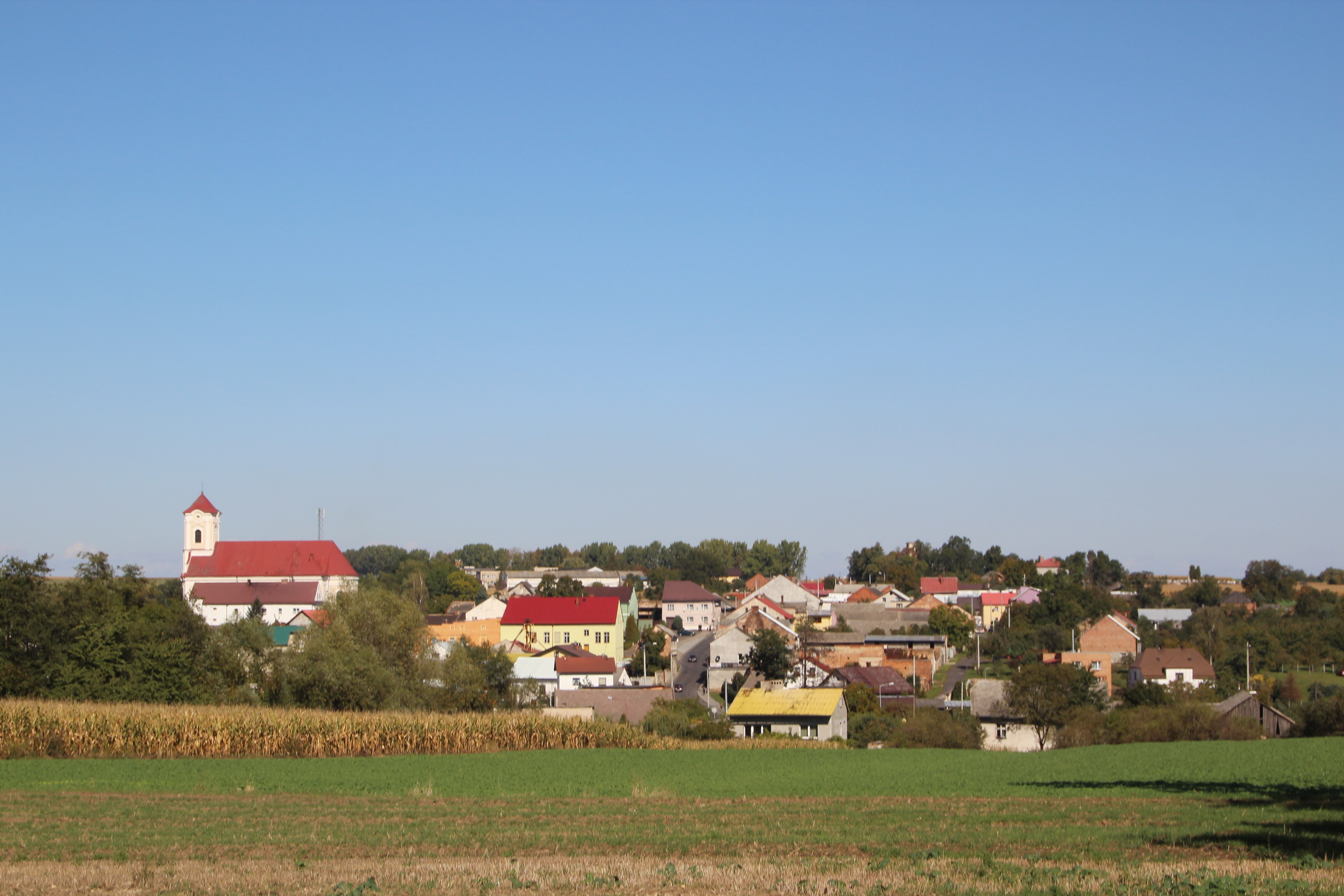

- Location within Poland
- Coordinates: 50°5′N 17°55′E
- Country: Poland
- Voivodeship: Opole
- County: Głubczyce
- Gmina: Kietrz
- Population: 922 (2,007)
- Postal Code: 48-133
- Car plates: OGL
- SIMC: 0496099

Nowa Cerekwia [ˈnɔva t͡sɛˈrɛkfja] is a village in the administrative district of Gmina Kietrz, within Głubczyce County, Opole Voivodeship, in south-western Poland, close to the Czech border.
