= Wojnowice, Opole Voivodeship =

Wojnowice, Poland
- Village
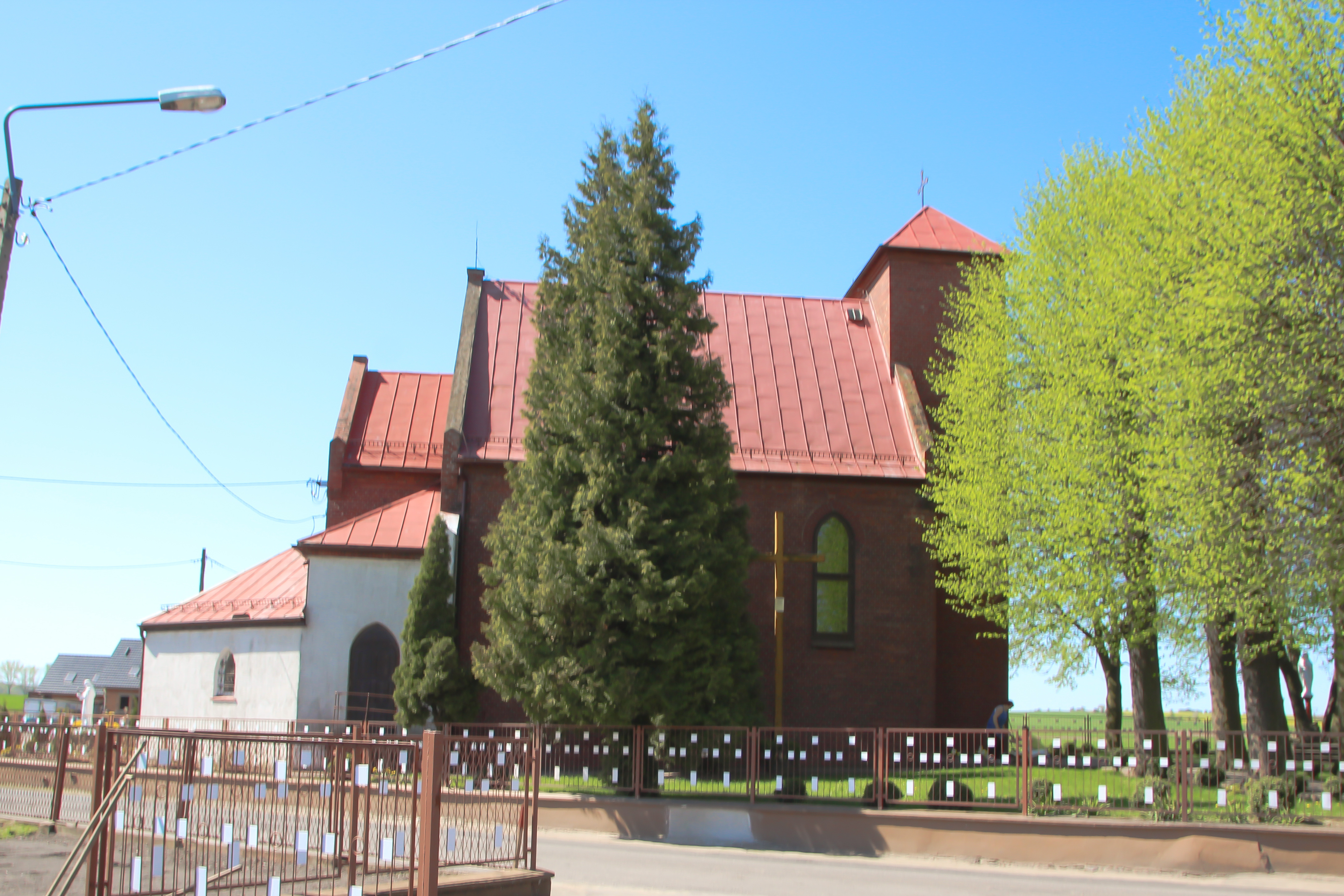

- Location within Poland
- Coordinates: 50°7′N 17°53′E
- Country: Poland
- Voivodeship: Opole
- County: Głubczyce
- Gmina: Kietrz
- Population: 522 (2,007)
- Website: http://www.wojnowice.net/

Wojnowice [vɔi̯nɔˈvit͡sɛ] is a village in the administrative district of Gmina Kietrz, within Głubczyce County, Opole Voivodeship, in south-western Poland, close to the Czech border.
