= Duderstadt =

- Town
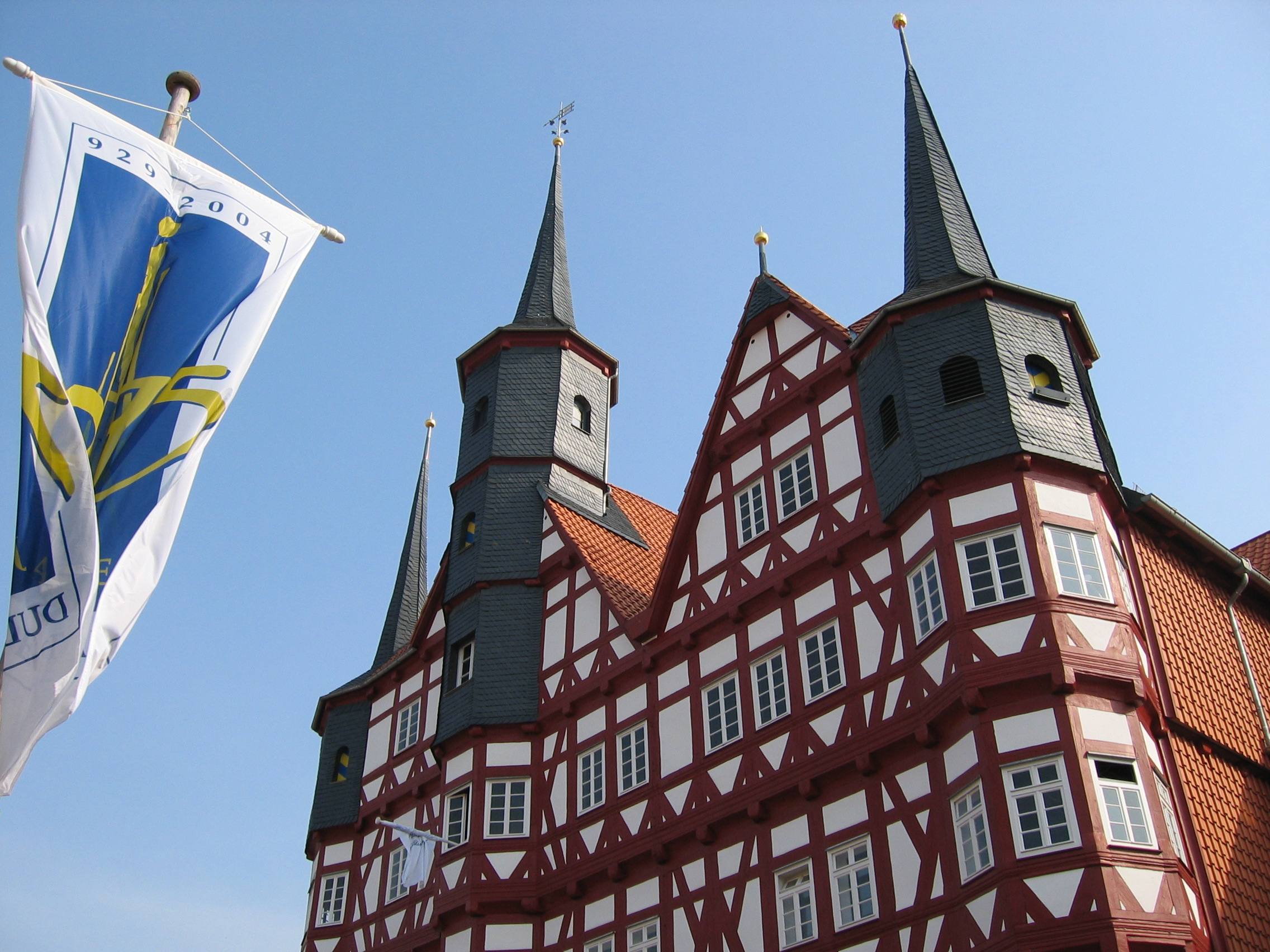
- The historic town hall (April 2004)

- Coat of arms

- Location of Duderstadt within Göttingen district
- Interactive map of Duderstadt
- Location within Germany Location within Lower Saxony
- Coordinates: 51°30′45″N 10°15′35″E
- Country: Germany
- State: Lower Saxony
- District: Göttingen
- Subdivisions: 15 districts

Government
  - Mayor (2019–24): Thorsten Feike (FDP)

Area
  - Total: 95.64 km^{2} (36.93 sq mi)
- Elevation: 180 m (590 ft)

Population (2025-12-31)
  - Total: 20,173
  - Density: 210.9/km^{2} (546.3/sq mi)
- Time zone: UTC+01:00 (CET)
  - Summer (DST): UTC+02:00 (CEST)
- Postal codes: 37115
- Dialling codes: 05527
- Vehicle registration: GÖ, DUD
- Website: www.duderstadt.de

Duderstadt (German pronunciation: [ˈduːdɐˌʃtat]) is a city in southern Lower Saxony, Germany, located in the district of Göttingen.

It is the centre and the capital of the northern part of the Eichsfeld ("Untereichsfeld"). It was once the private wealth of the Roman Catholic archbishop of Mainz.

The earliest documentary mention of Duderstadt was in 929 AD, and the city celebrates its anniversaries counting from that year.

It is located on the German Timber-Frame Road.

== Architecture ==
The city contains many historical buildings in the half-timber style, most notably along the Market Street, which stretches from the St. Cyriakuskirche (Catholic, built 1250–1490), also called "Oberkirche" (upper church), down to the St. Servatiuskirche (Protestant, built 1370–1520), also called "Unterkirche" (nether church).

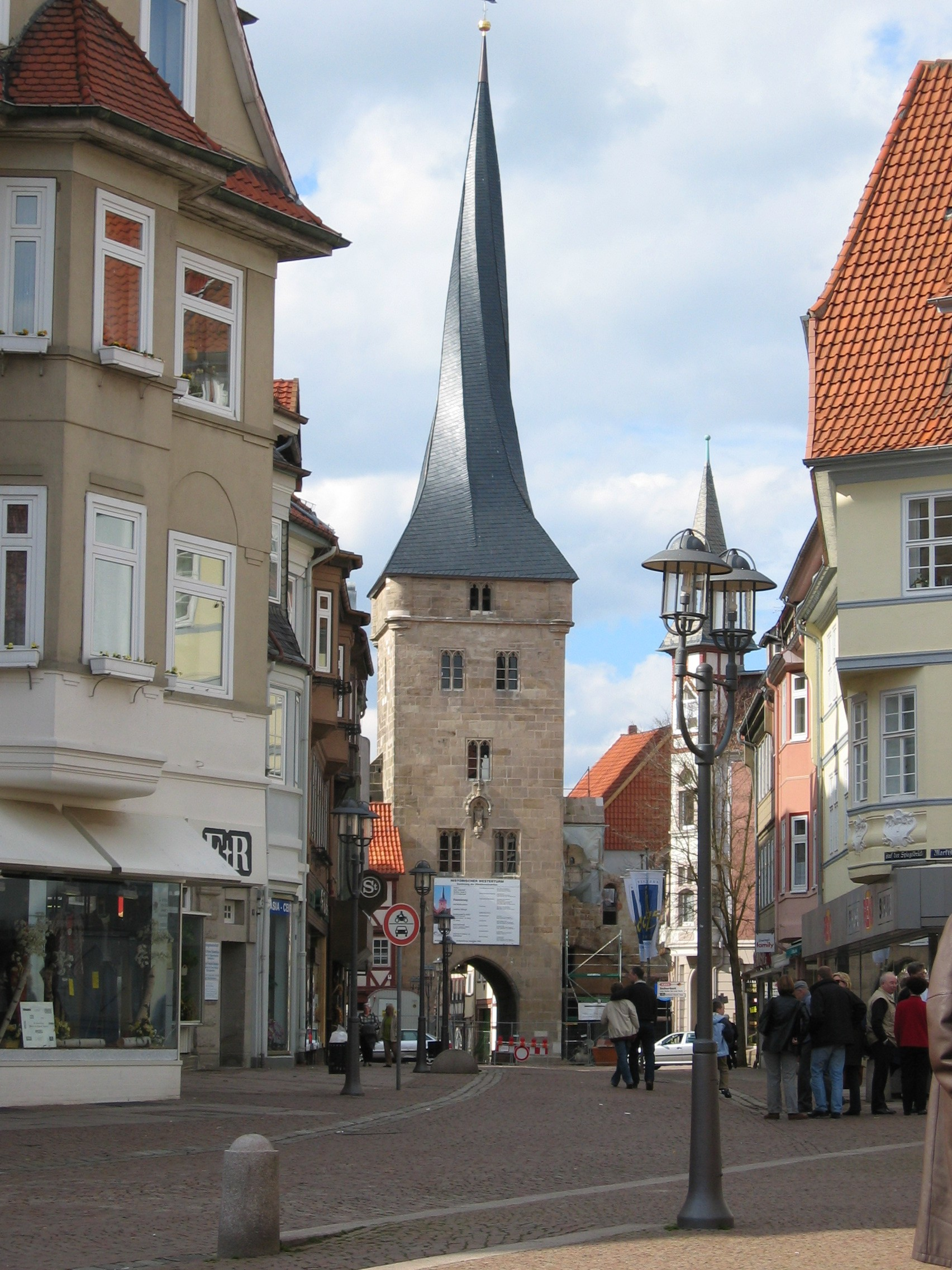
Old town gate Westerturm

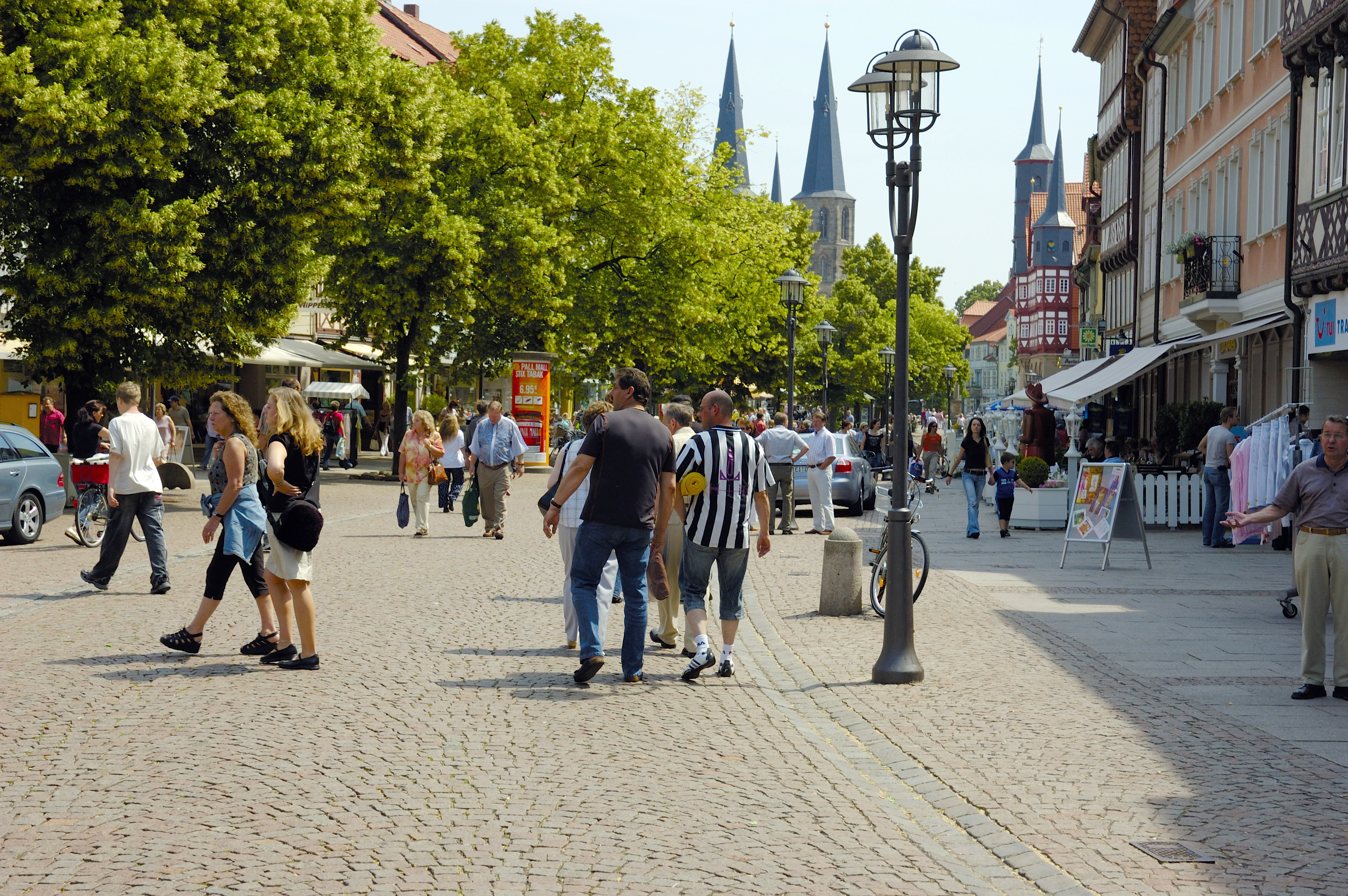
Main road Marktstraße

Built in 1343, the Westerturm is one of at least eight gate towers and peels of the city's fortress wall, it burned down in 1424 and was rebuilt over the course of 12 years. The Westerturm has a very distinctive twisted roof. Though not the only tower in Germany with a twisted roof, its execution was particularly successful. There are a number of folk tales to explain the twist: one tale claims that an unoiled weather vane caused the wind to twist the roof. Another claims that when the devil was driving the men of Duderstadt to drink, the women drove him away, but not before he grabbed the tower and twisted it while passing over the wall, making his escape.

Construction of the Rathaus (city council building) began in 1302, with additional wings and components added until 1674. It was completely restored in the 1980s and most recently in 2002. At particular hours, a carillon plays from one of the towers as a bust of the "Anreis" (also: "Anreischke") comes out and nods.

== The "Anreischke" ==
The city Innenstadt is surrounded by a 3 kilometres (2 miles) long earthen wall which was constructed by a traveling master fortress builder named Andreas. The city council (Rat) of Duderstadt contracted with Andreas in 1506 to build the wall. Since the surrounding farmers were also to be protected by the wall, the Rat conscripted them to work on the construction of the wall. Andreas was reportedly a cruel taskmaster, and the farmers detested him. They soon also blamed the citizens of Duderstadt for their woes, and took to calling all of them "Anreischke", after Andreas, which was pronounced "Anreis" in the "platt" (low) German spoken by the farmers.

The citizens of Duderstadt, in turn, had a wooden bust of Andreas constructed and attached to a clockwork. Every two hours since then, the wooden "Anreischke" would come out and nod to the farmers coming to market, to remind them of the detested Andreas, and of their dependency on the city.

That wooden Anreischke nods until this day from the Rathaus tower at 9 am, 11, 1 pm, 3, 5 and 7.

== Otto Bock ==
A Duderstadt-headquartered company is the Otto Bock corporation, named after its founder. Otto Bock produces state-of-the-art prosthetic limbs and other health products. Though now an international company, it is still headquartered in Duderstadt. Revenue in 2003 was 355.5 million euros. Otto Bock was a significant contributor to economic growth in the region in the postwar period.

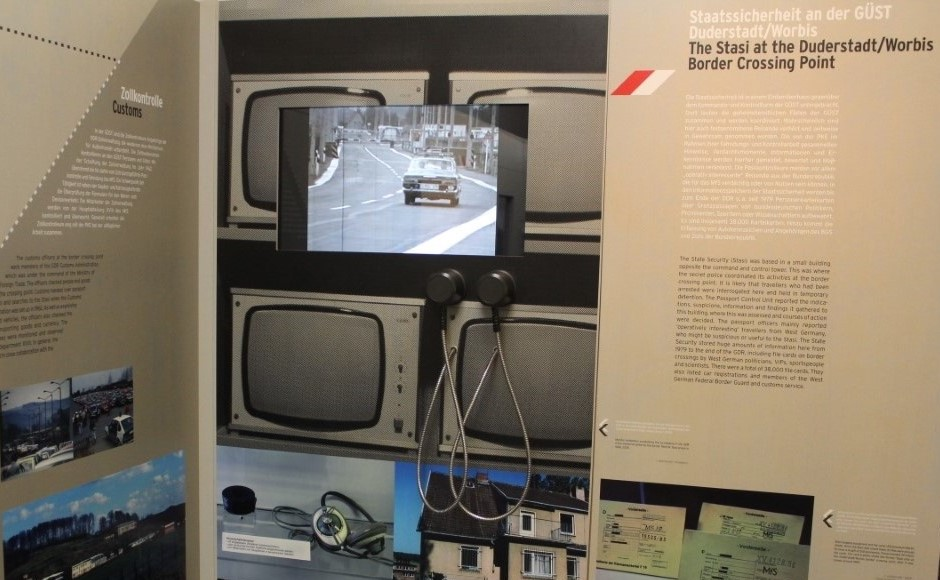
The exhibition at the Borderland Museum Eichsfeld is displayed in both German and English and attracts visitors worldwide.

== Culture ==
The Duderstadt Heimatmuseum has a collection of locally significant artifacts. Exhibitions include temporary ones and a room with a glass floor installed in the late twentieth century so that visitors can see the original stone wall construction underneath the building.

Not far from Duderstadt, the Borderland Museum Eichsfeld in Teistungen addresses various aspects of the inner-German border, the German division and the history of the GDR. The museum area also includes a circular hiking trail along the former Iron Curtain.

== Notable people ==
- Georg von Kopp (1837–1914), Cardinal of the RC Church; Bishop of Fulda (1881–1887) and Prince-Bishop of Breslau (1887–1914).
- Theodor Barth (1849–1909), politician, member of the Reichstag
- Angela Zigahl (1885–1955), teacher and politician, died locally
- Tilo Medek (1940–2006), a German classical composer, musicologist and music publisher; died locally
