= Pelhřimovy =

- Former village
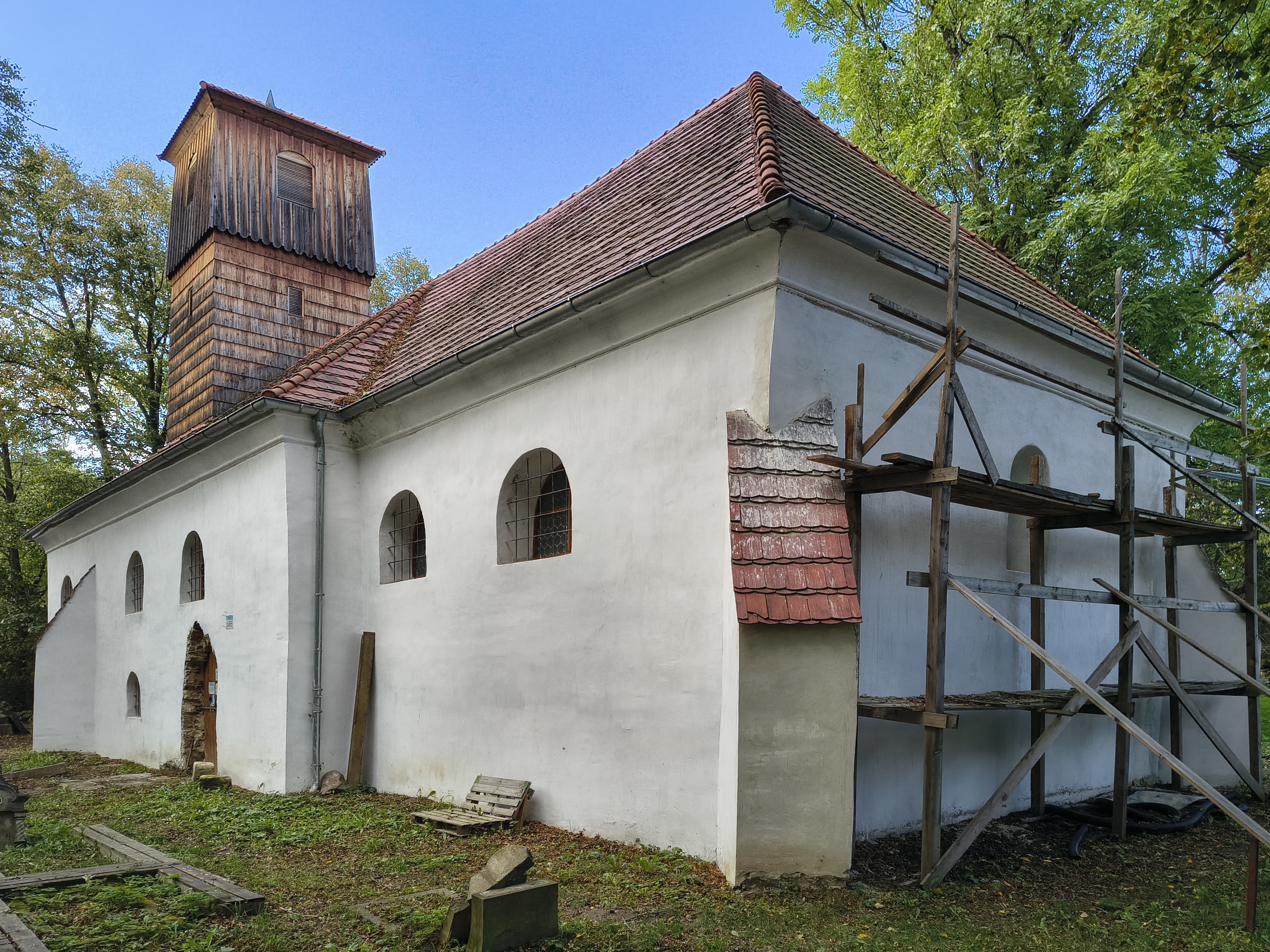
- Church of St. George

- Location within Czech Republic
- Coordinates: 50°10′43″N 17°39′46″E
- Country: Czech Republic
- District: Bruntál District
- Municipality: Slezské Rudoltice

Pelhřimovy (German: Mährisch Pilgersdorf) is a former village near Slezské Rudoltice, Bruntál District, Czech Republic. It is located in the southeastern part of the Zlatohorská Highlands along the stream Wielki Potok (also Potok Grozowy or Troja in Polish). The other part of the village still exists on the other side of the border in Poland, as Pielgrzymów.

== Attractions ==
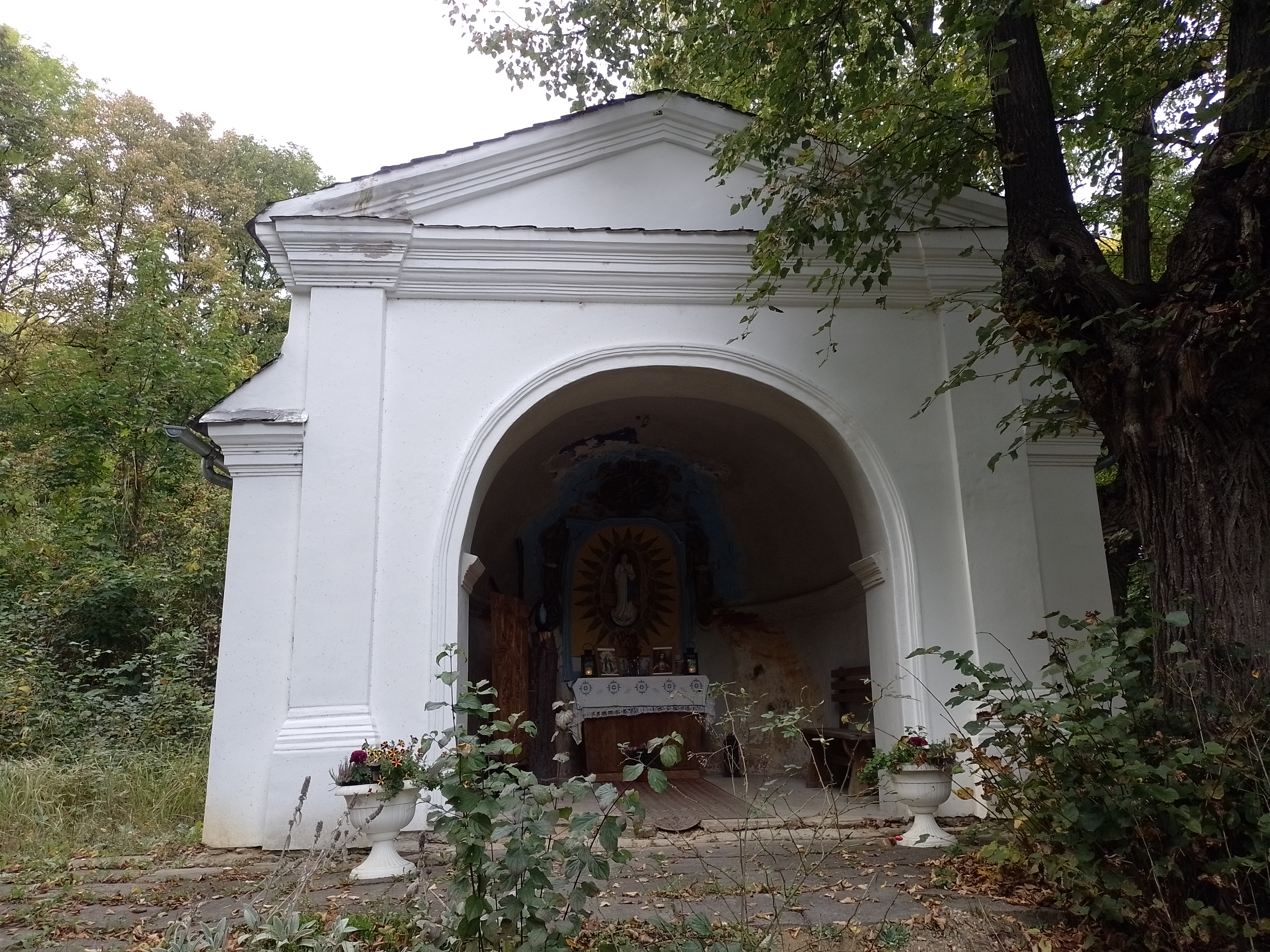
Chapel of Saint Anne, renovated in 2016

In Pelhřimovy is the ruined Church of St. George. On the Polish side of the river lies its twin village, Pielgrzymów. By 1742 it belonged to the Silesian Krnov principality.

== History ==
The first recorded mention of Pelhřimovy was in 1377, during the period of colonization carried out by Bruno von Schauenburg in the mid-13th century. Until the end of World War II, the town was a pure Sudeten German community. The 1930 census recorded 217 inhabitants. Most of the houses were heavily damaged during the Second World War II. In July and August 1946, the local Sudeten German population was expelled. Beginning at the end of February 1946, new settlers arrived. Among them were Slovaks and later mainly Volhynian Czechs. After February 1948, the Ministry of the Interior banned settlement within 300 meters of the state border on ideological grounds. Between 1949 and 1950, the village was demolished. On 2 February 1950, MNV Slezské Rudoltice was handed over to the local administrative commission, which had overseen the municipality since 1945. The formerly independent municipality officially became part of the Silesian Rudoltice on 22 August 1951. Of the original 70 residential houses only two remain, which are used for recreation and have house numbers 113 and 114, respectively.

In 2020, the Polish Army entered some parts of the village as a result of a misunderstanding during the COVID-19 response, and "occupied" parts of the village for two weeks. During this time, several Czech citizens were unable to access the area, and the Chapel of Saint Anne located some 30 meters from the border.
