= Dzierżysław, Opole Voivodeship =

Dzierżysław
- Village
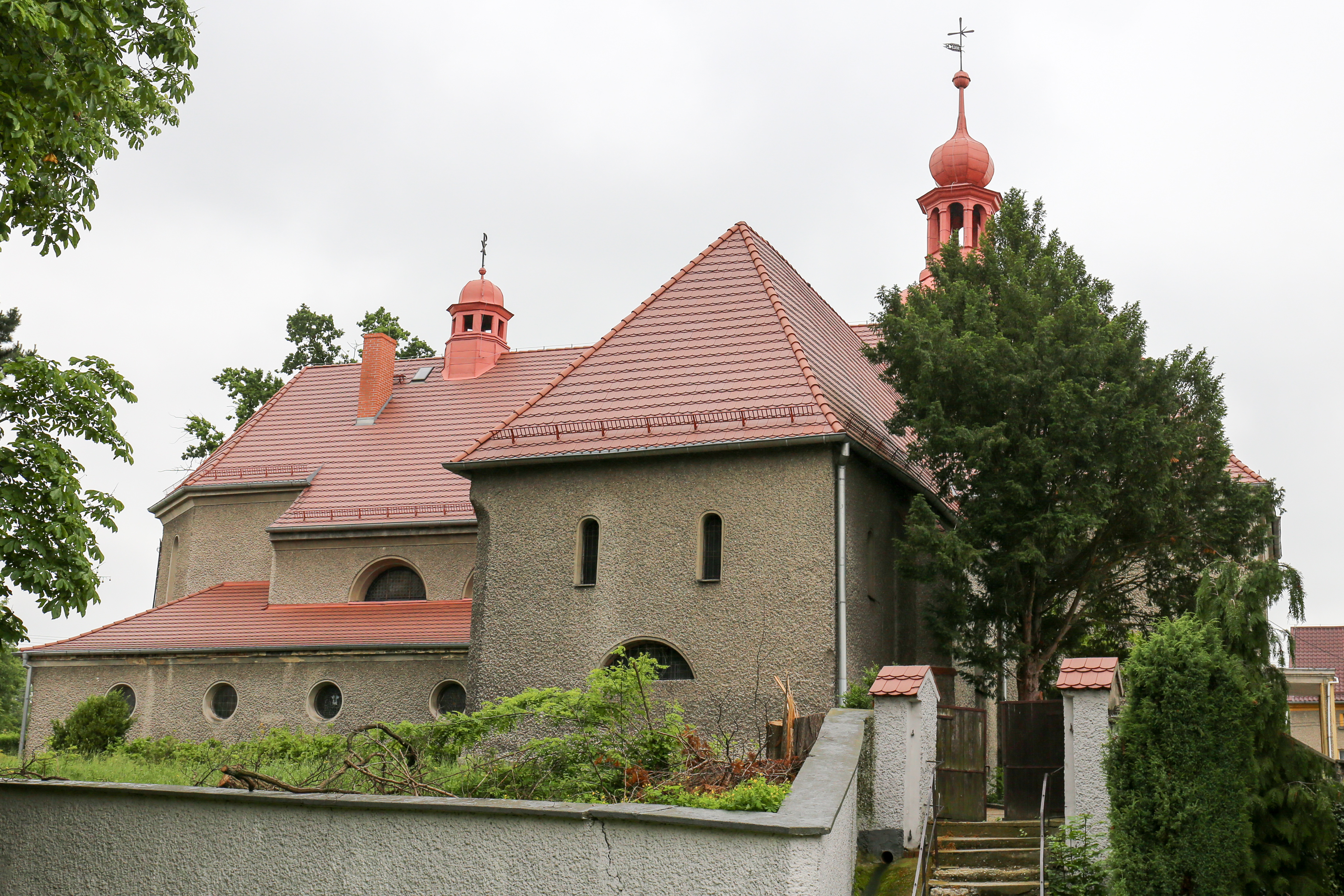
- Saint Bartholomew church in Dzierżysław
- Interactive map of Dzierżysław
- Location within Poland
- Coordinates: 50°2′N 17°57′E
- Country: Poland
- Voivodeship: Opole
- County: Głubczyce
- Gmina: Kietrz
- Population: 615 (2,007)
- Time zone: UTC+1 (CET)
  - Summer (DST): UTC+2 (CEST)
- Vehicle registration: OGL

Dzierżysław [d͡ʑɛrˈʐɨswaf] is a village in the administrative district of Gmina Kietrz, within Głubczyce County, Opole Voivodeship, in south-western Poland, close to the Czech border.

== History ==
The name of the village comes from the Old Polish male name Dzierżysław.

During World War II, the Germans operated the E201 forced labour subcamp of the Stalag VIII-B/344 prisoner-of-war camp in the village. In July 1945, first Polish settlers arrived. On September 11, Polish militia interned the village people whose houses were plunderd in the meantime. Eventually, public notices informed the locals that their home had been assigned to Poland. Officials and clergymen were deported July 6, all others July 23, 1945.
