= Slezské Rudoltice =

- Municipality
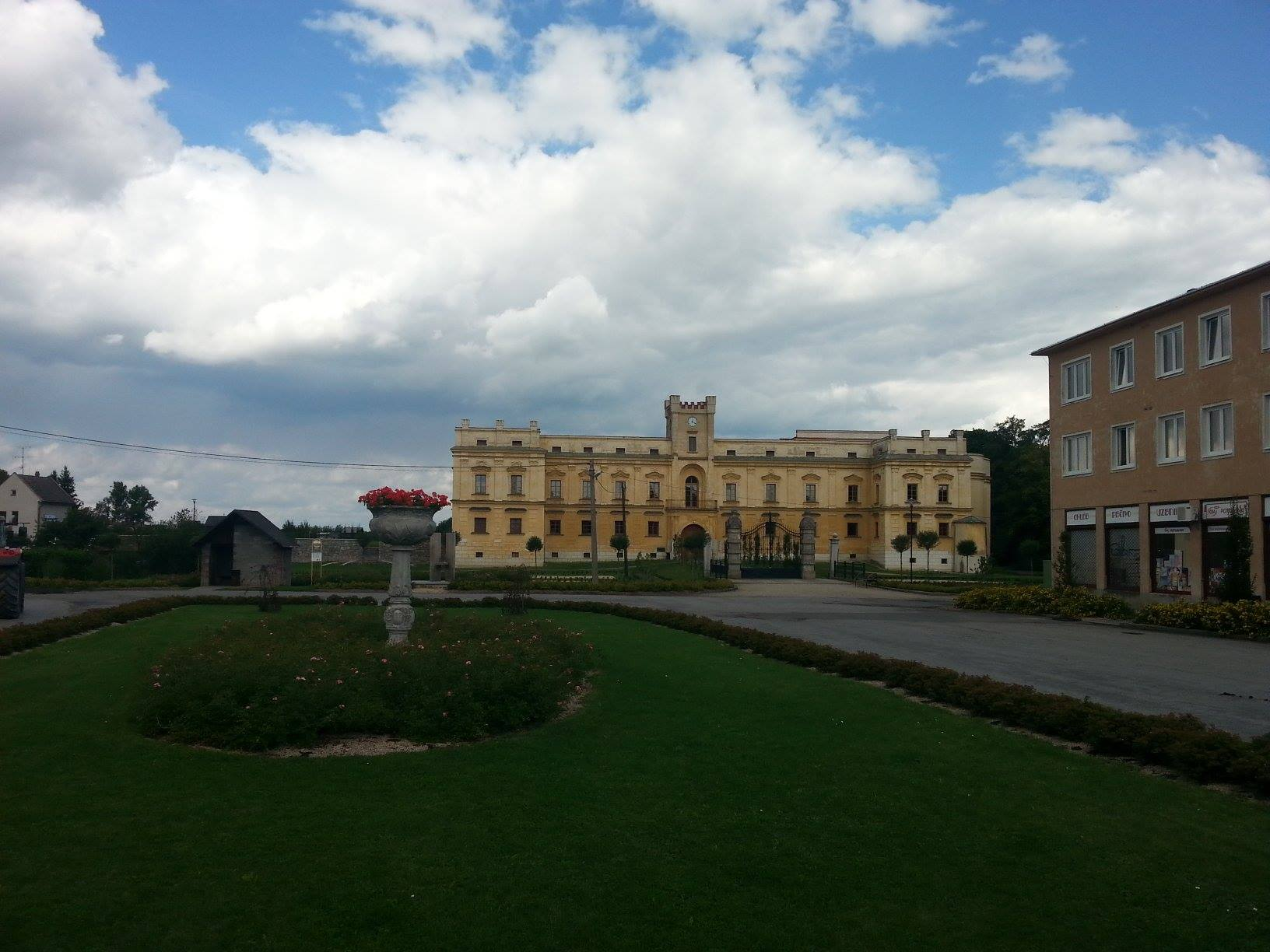
- Centre of Slezské Rudoltice

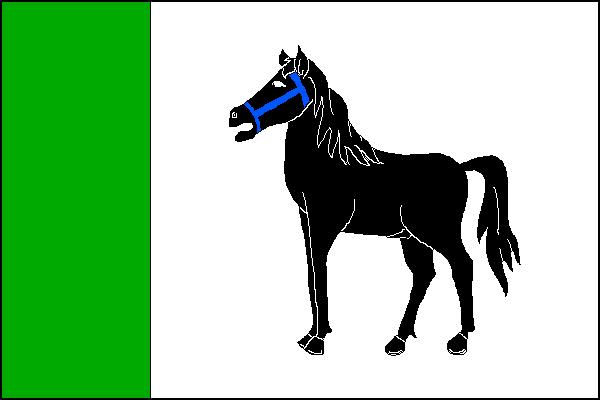
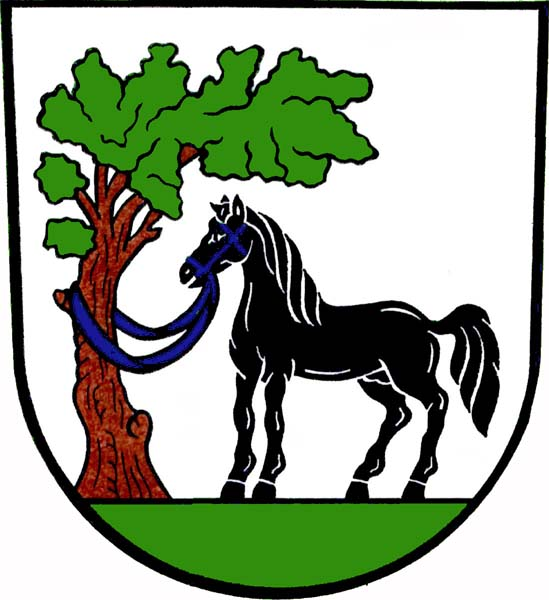
- Flag Coat of arms

- Location in the Czech Republic
- Coordinates: 50°12′25″N 17°40′52″E
- Country: Czech Republic
- Region: Moravian-Silesian
- District: Bruntál
- First mentioned: 1255

Area
  - Total: 23.22 km^{2} (8.97 sq mi)
- Elevation: 275 m (902 ft)

Population (2026-01-01)
  - Total: 504
  - Density: 21.7/km^{2} (56.2/sq mi)
- Time zone: UTC+1 (CET)
  - Summer (DST): UTC+2 (CEST)
- Postal code: 793 97
- Website: www.slezskerudoltice.cz

Slezské Rudoltice (German: Rosswald) is a municipality and village in Bruntál District in the Moravian-Silesian Region of the Czech Republic. It has about 500 inhabitants.

== Administrative division ==
Slezské Rudoltice consists of five municipal parts (in brackets population according to the 2021 census):

- Slezské Rudoltice (407)
- Amalín (30)
- Koberno (30)
- Víno (13)

== Geography ==
Slezské Rudoltice is located about 28 kilometres (17 mi) northeast of Bruntál and 56 km (35 mi) northwest of Ostrava. It is situated in the Osoblažsko microregion on the border with Poland. It lies in the Zlatohorská Highlands. The Lužná Stream, a tributary of the Osoblaha, originates in the western part of the municipal territory and flows across the territory.

== History ==
The first written mention of Rudoltice is from 1255. It was one of the settlements that were founded in the area shortly before at the initiative of the bishop Bruno von Schauenburg. The area was then settled by German colonisers.

The local medieval fortress was rebuilt into a small Renaissance castle in 1548–1565. In 1630, after the Rudoltice fief was shortly owned by Maximilian, Prince of Dietrichstein, it was acquired by the Counts of Hodice. From 1661 to 1778, Rudoltice was an estate associated in particular with Albert of Hodice (1706–1778), thanks to which it flourished. He had rebuilt the castle in the Baroque style and turned Rudoltice a cultural centre of Silesia. Rudoltice began to be nicknamed "Silesian Versailles" and among the guests at the castle were the composer Carl Ditters von Dittersdorf and the Prussian king Frederick the Great. However, Albert of Hodice indebted the estate, and therefore it had to be divided and sold out in order to pay off debts. Valuable things and furniture from the castle were also sold out.

In 1938, Rudoltice was annexed by Nazi Germany and administered as a part of the Reichsgau Sudetenland. After World War II, the German-speaking population was expelled and the village was resettled by Czechs. The neighbouring village of Pelhřimovy was razed to the ground after the Germans left and disappeared.

The current municipality of Slezské Rudoltice was created in 1947 by merger of Městys Rudoltice and Ves Rudoltice (including Amalín). In 1949, the villages of Víno and Nový Les, and the area of the abandoned village of Pelhřimovy were annexed to the municipality. In 1960, Koberno was joined.

== Demographics ==
Historical population

Year	Pop.	±%
1869	1,976	—
1880	2,064	+4.5%
1890	1,936	−6.2%
1900	1,805	−6.8%
1910	1,718	−4.8%

Year	Pop.	±%
1921	1,667	−3.0%
1930	1,536	−7.9%
1950	555	−63.9%
1961	665	+19.8%
1970	755	+13.5%

Year	Pop.	±%
1980	671	−11.1%
1991	611	−8.9%
2001	652	+6.7%
2011	519	−20.4%
2021	480	−7.5%

Source: Censuses

== Transport ==
Slezské Rudoltice is located on the narrow-gauge Třemešná ve Slezsku–Osoblaha railway. The municipality is served by three stops: Amalín, Slezské Rudoltice and Koberno. However, the Koberno stop is located outside the municipal territory.

== Sights ==
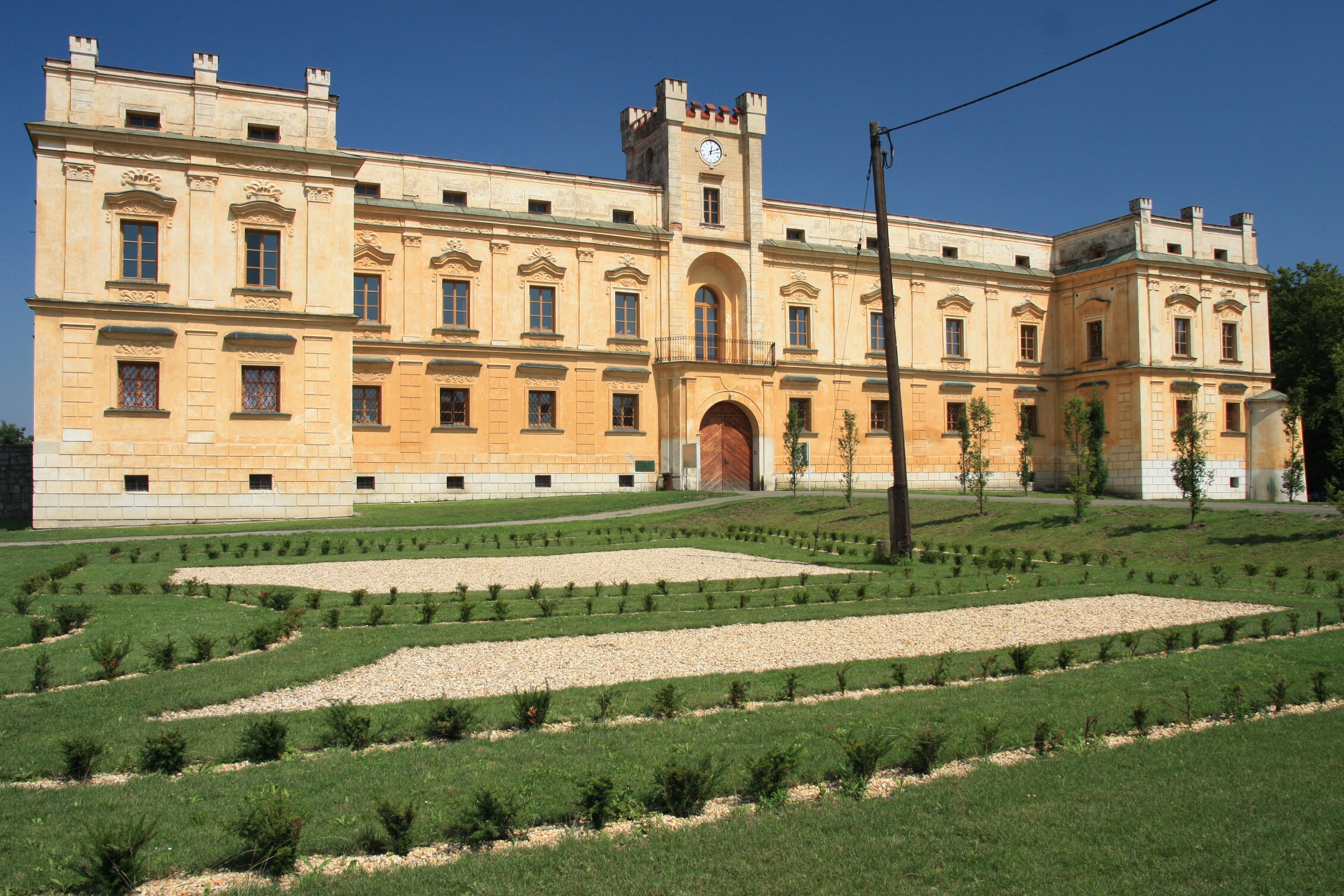
Slezské Rudoltice Castle

The main landmark is Slezské Rudoltice Castle. Since 2008 it has been owned by the municipality which opened it to public. Part of the castle is a small park of French and English type with a pond.

The second notable landmark of the municipality is the Church of Saint Catherine. An originally Romanesque church in Rudoltice was first documented in the late 17th century. The church fell into disrepair and was demolished in 1871, and the new Neo-Romanesque church was built on its site in 1871–1874.

The Church of Saint George is located in Pelhřimovy. It is a Gothic church from the 15th century. Together with two cottages and a ruined cemetery, they are the last remains of the abandoned village.

The narrow-gauge railway serves not only for transport but also as a tourist attraction. Steam trains run on it on weekends during the tourist season.
