= Theodor Barth =

German politician and publicist (1849–1909)

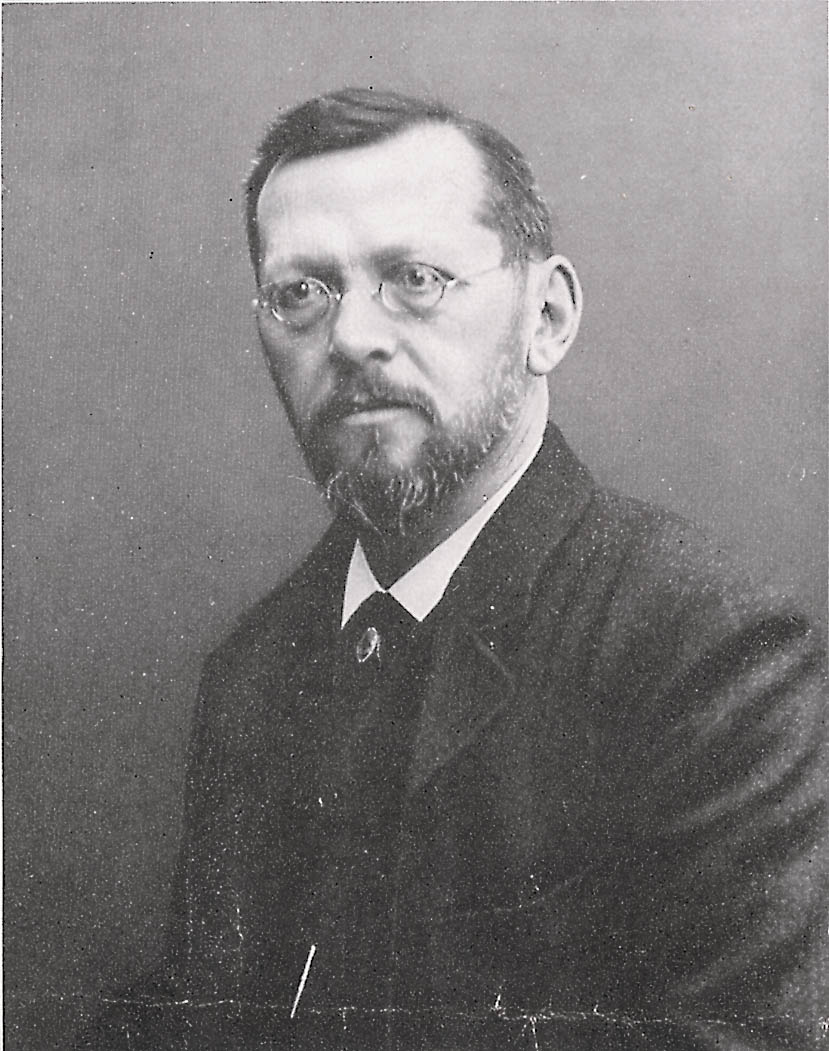

Reichstag
- In office 1881–1903

Personal details
- Born: 16 July 1849 Duderstadt
- Died: 3 June 1909 (aged 59) Baden-Baden
- Party: National Liberal Party; Liberal Union; German Free-minded Party; Free-minded Union; Democratic Union
- Spouse: Henriette Dreyer (⚭ 1880)
- Children: 2 sons, 3 daughters
- Occupation: Politician, publicist

Theodor Barth (16 July 1849 – 3 June 1909) was a German liberal politician, publicist and economist. He was a member of the Reichstag between 1881 and 1884, between 1885 and 1898, and between 1901 and 1903.

== Career ==
Barth started his political career with the National Liberal Party. He soon rejected the Manchesterism of the old liberals, though, and claimed that liberalism needed a social programme. To that end, he sought the cooperation of the Social Democrats, and at multiple times voted against his own party. In the German Freeminded Party (Freisinnige Partei), founded in 1884, Barth would soon find himself opposed to the leadership of Eugen Richter. When the Freeminded Party split in 1893, Barth became a member of the Freeminded Union (Freisinnigen Vereinigung), instead of the Freeminded People's Party of Richter. In 1903, Friedrich Naumann would join the Freeminded Union as well. Barth however would found the Democratic Union (Demokratische Vereinigung) in 1908, together with Rudolf Breitscheid and Hellmut von Gerlach, after the Freeminded Union's participation in the Bülow-Block coalition in the 1907 elections.

Barth founded the liberal weekly Die Nation (The Nation) in 1883 and remained as editor until his death in 1909.

== See also ==
- Liberalism
- Liberalism in Germany
