= Krásné Pole =

Municipal part of Ostrava, Czech Republic

- Municipal district of Ostrava
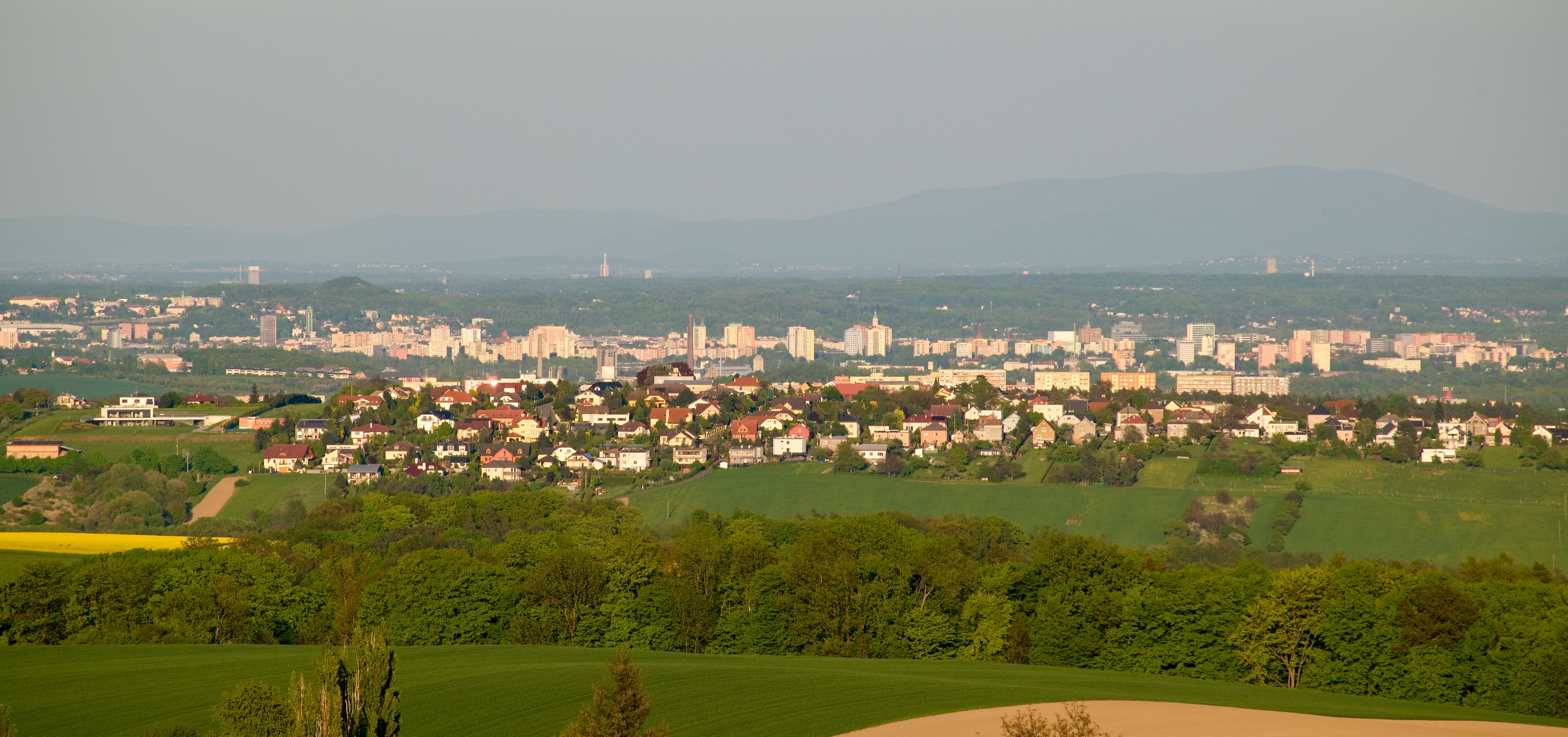
- Areal view of Krásné Pole, other parts of Ostrava can be seen in the background

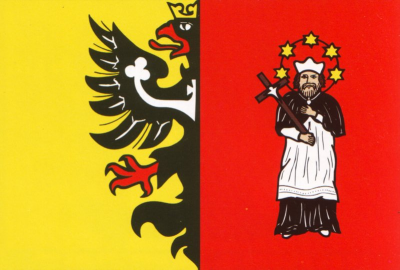
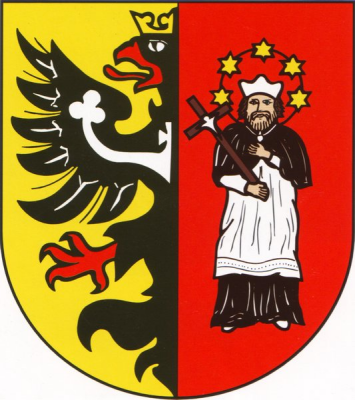
- Flag Coat of arms

- Location of Krásné Pole in Ostrava
- Coordinates: 49.8441°N 18.1225°E
- Country: Czech Republic
- Region: Moravian-Silesian Region
- City: Ostrava

Area
  - Total: 6.59 km^{2} (2.54 sq mi)

Population (2021)
  - Total: 2,652
  - Density: 402/km^{2} (1,040/sq mi)
- Time zone: UTC+1 (CET)
  - Summer (DST): UTC+2 (CEST)
- Postal code: 725 26
- Website: https://krasnepole.ostrava.cz/cs

Krásné Pole is a borough and municipal district of the city of Ostrava, Czech Republic, situated in the western part of the city. Originally, it was a separate village, until it merged with Ostrava in April 1976. On 24 November 1990, it became one of the 23 self-governing boroughs of Ostrava. With its elevation of 334 meters (1,096 feet), it is the highest-located borough of Ostrava.

== Etymology ==
The adjective krásné (neuter form of krásný) means beautiful in Czech, and the noun pole means field, the name therefore translates to English as 'Beautiful Field'. The name was likely chosen due to the panoramic view of the Beskid Mountains visible from the area.

== Gallery ==
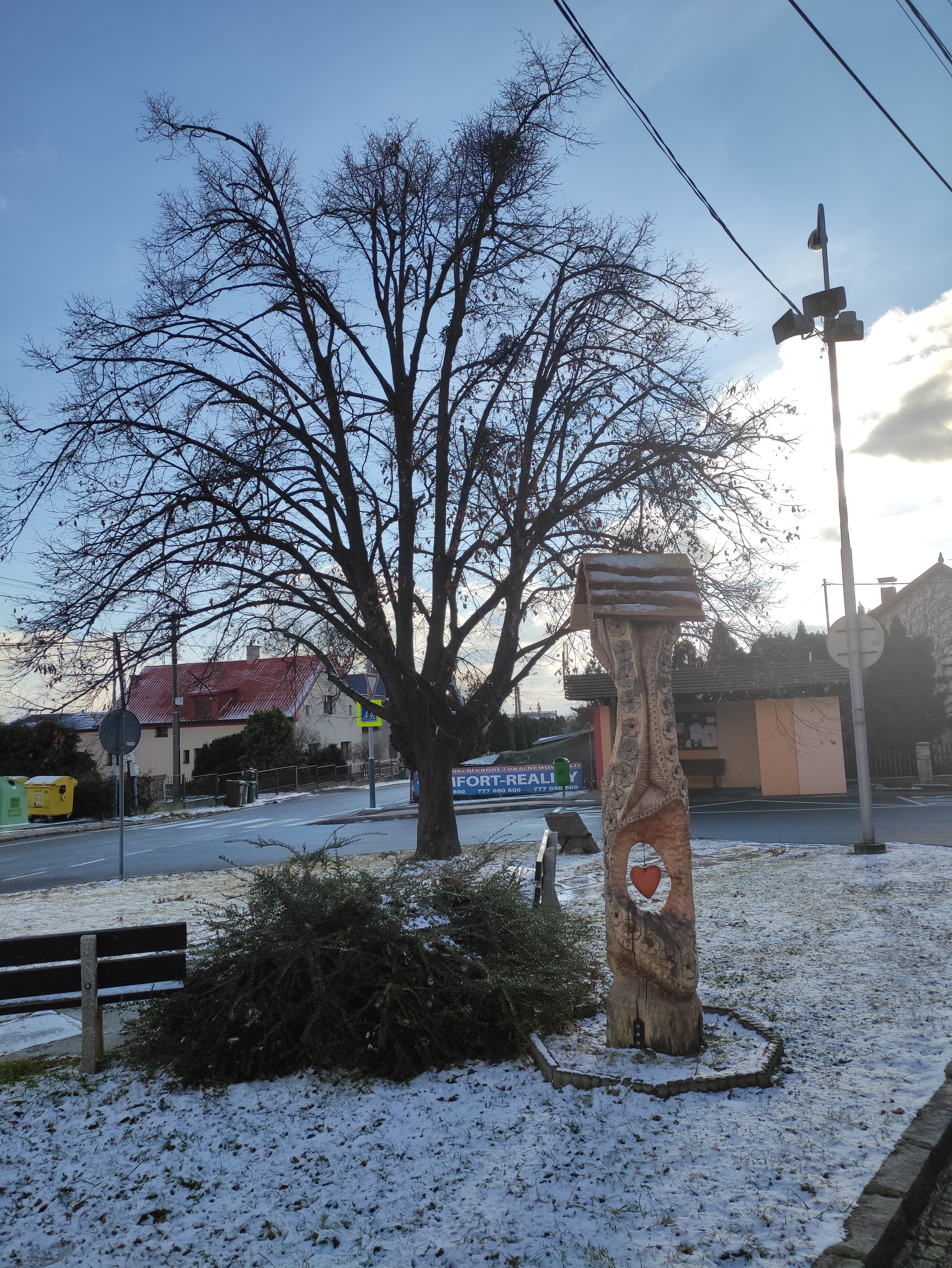
The Linden of the Republic

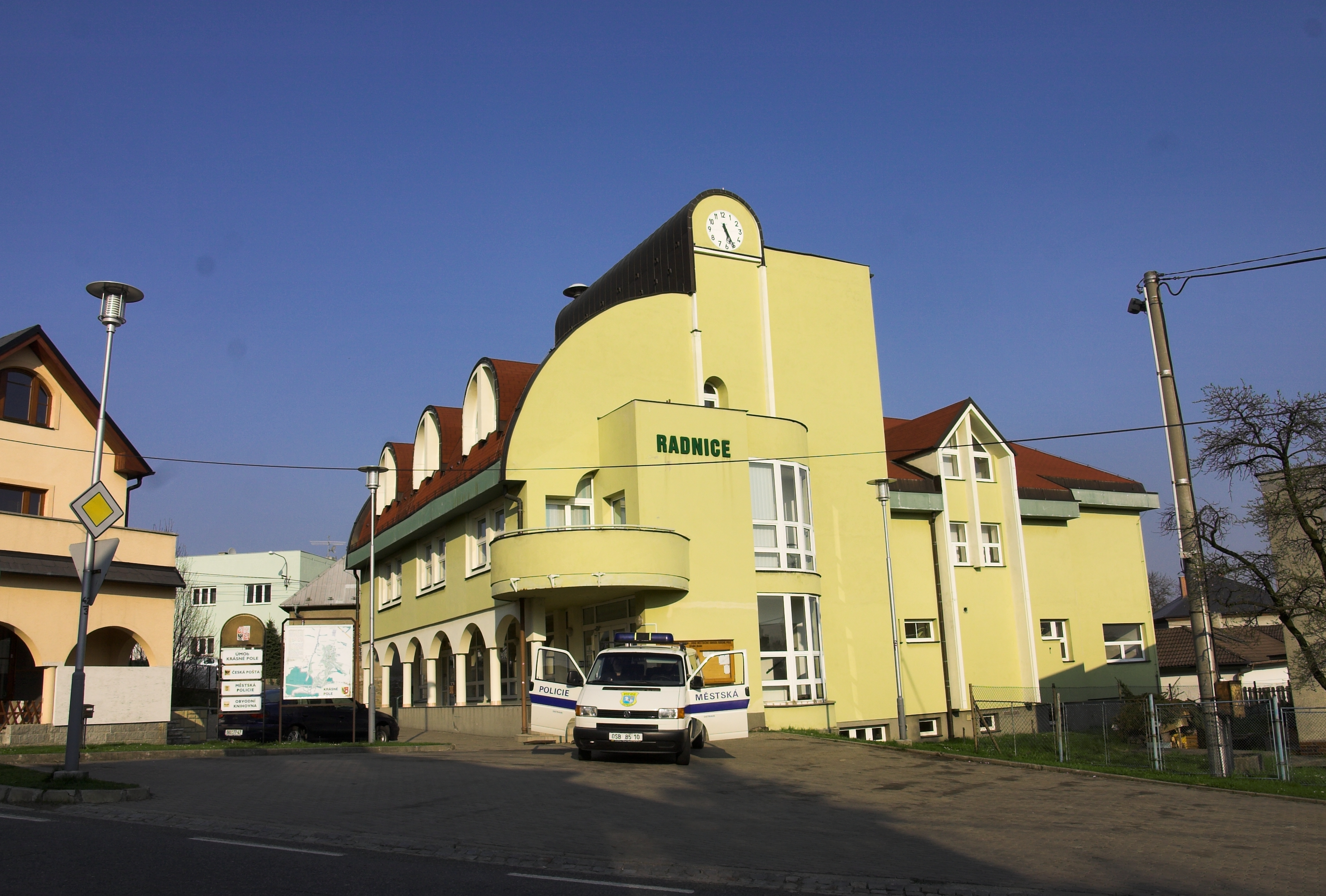
Municipal district office of Krásné Pole

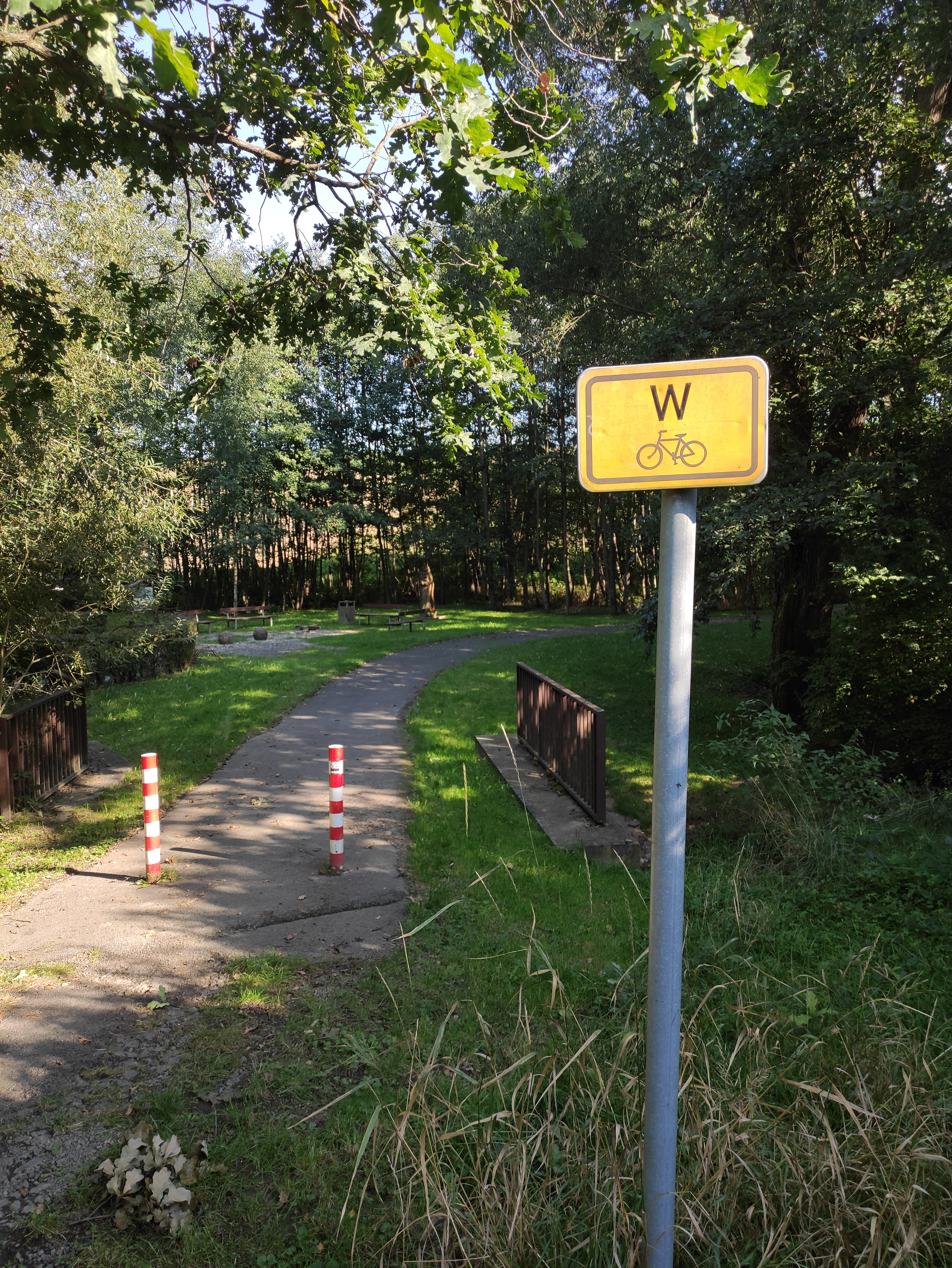
Bikeway in Krásné Pole
