= Lisięcice =

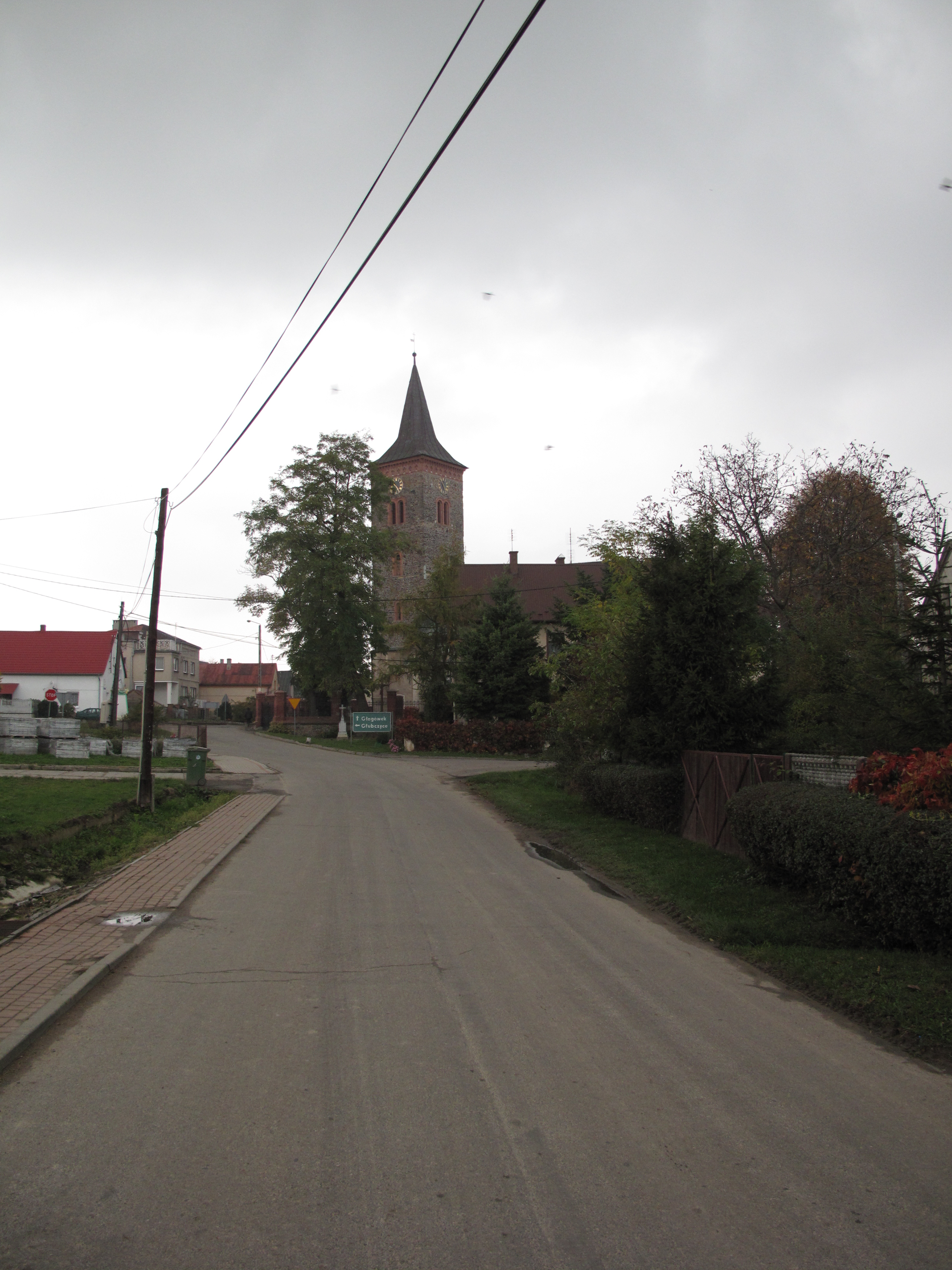
- Church of the Exaltation of the Holy Cross

- Location within Poland
- Coordinates: 50°15′44″N 17°52′37″E
- Country: Poland
- Voivodeship: Opole
- County: Głubczyce
- Gmina: Głubczyce
- Time zone: UTC+1 (CET)
  - Summer (DST): UTC+2 (CEST)
- Postal code: 48-118
- Area code: +48 77
- Car plates: OGL

Lisięcice [liɕɛ̃ˈt͡ɕit͡sɛ] is a village located in the Opole Voivodeship (south-western Poland), Głubczyce County, Gmina Głubczyce.

== Monuments ==
The following monuments are listed by the Narodowy Instytut Dziedzictwa.

- kościół par. pw. Podwyższenia Krzyża, z XV w., 1667 r., 1812 r

15th century Parish church.

- zagroda nr 61

Historic homestead.

- zagroda nr 72

Historic homestead.

- zagroda nr 171, z poł. XIX w.

Historic homestead from the 19th century.

== Gallery ==
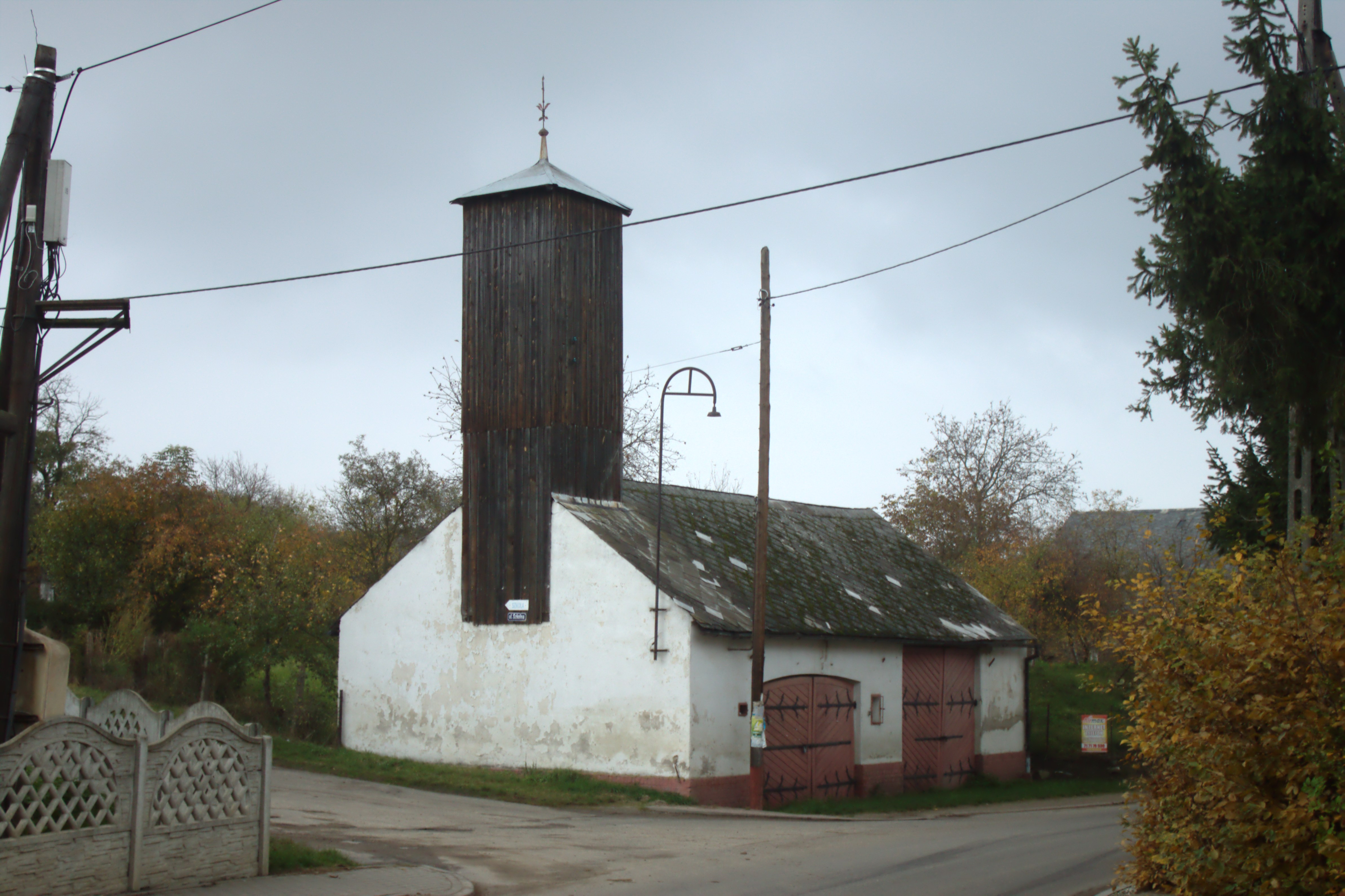
Fire department station

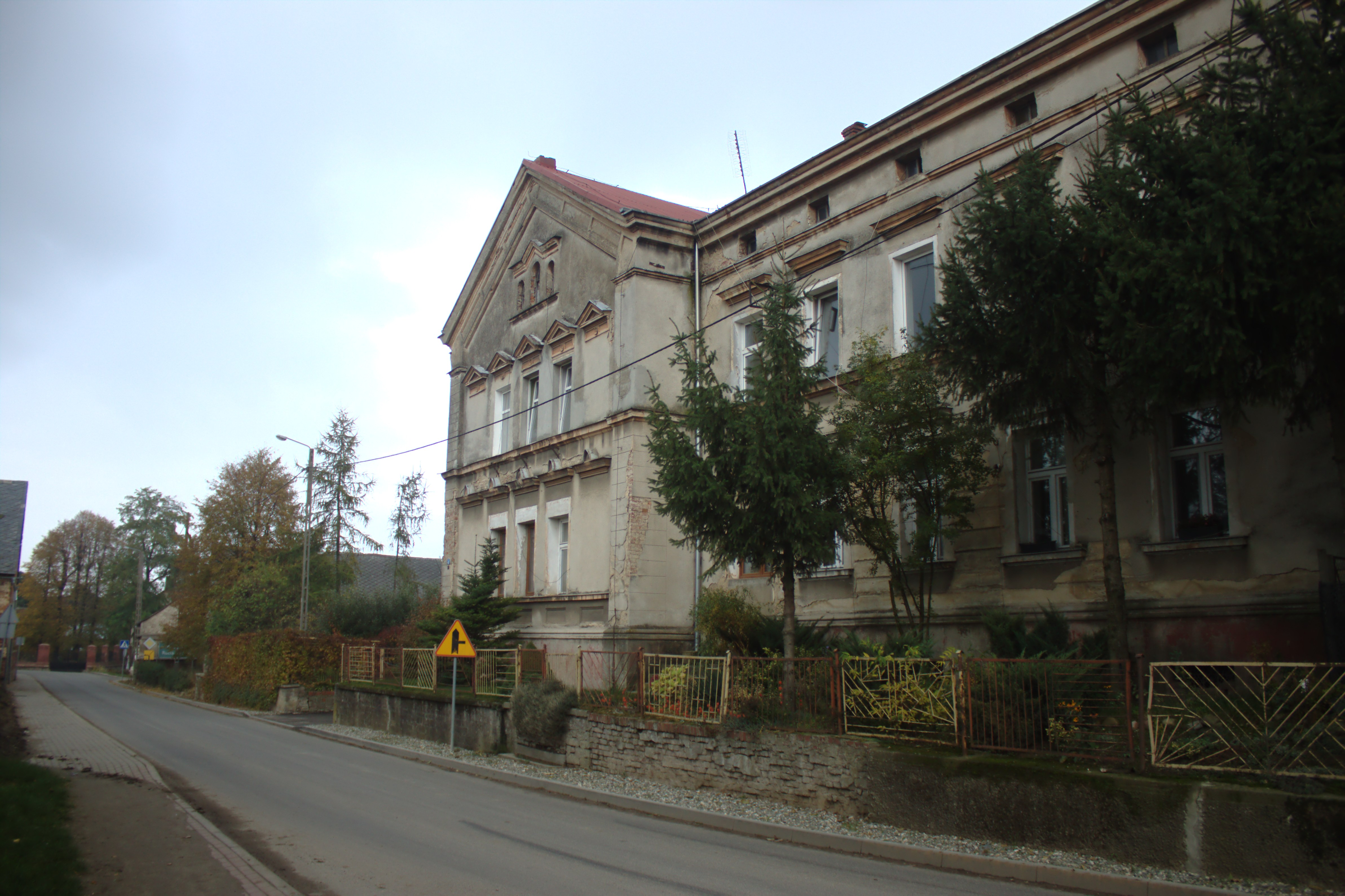
House

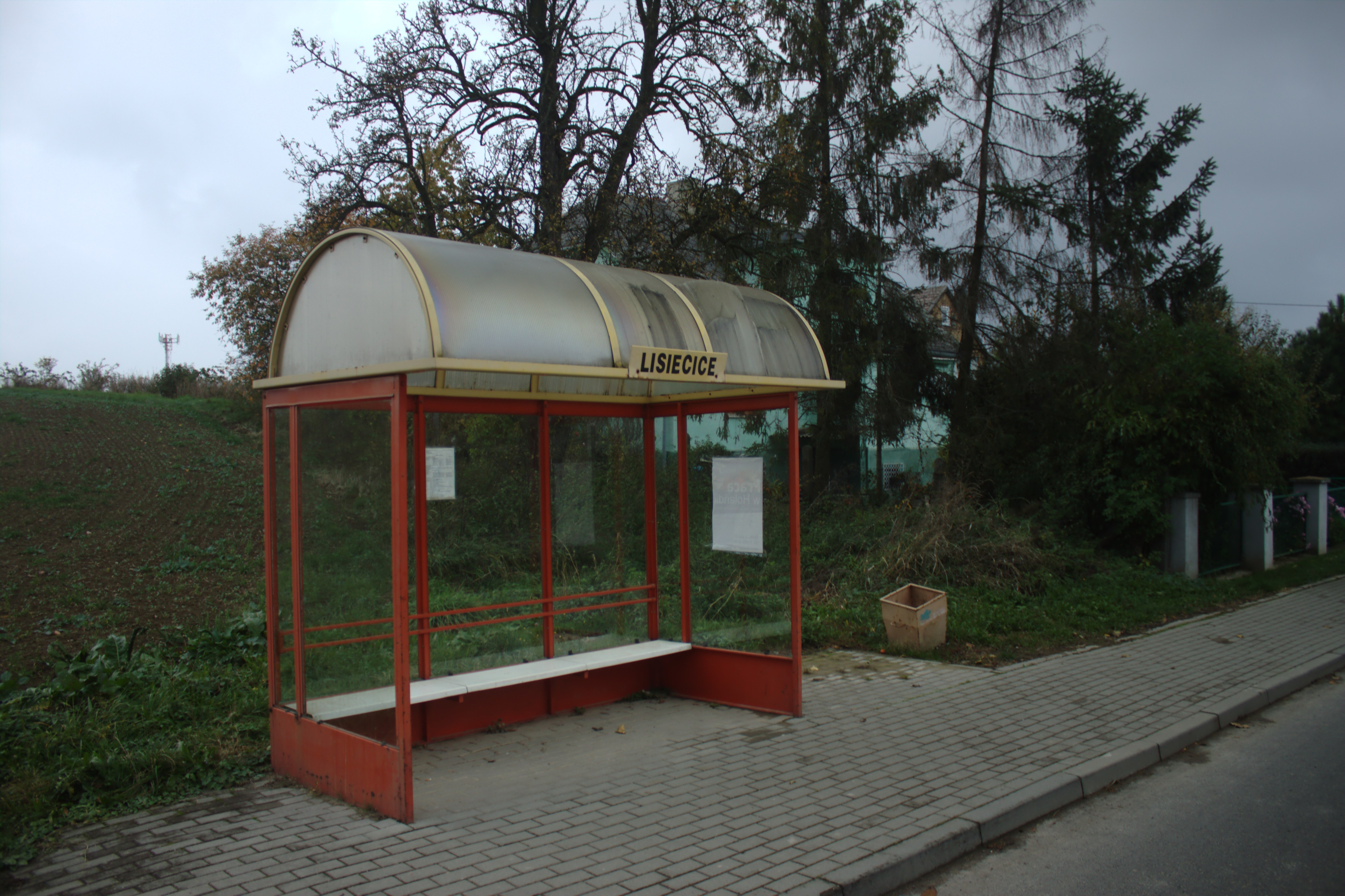
Bus stop
