= Pielgrzymów =

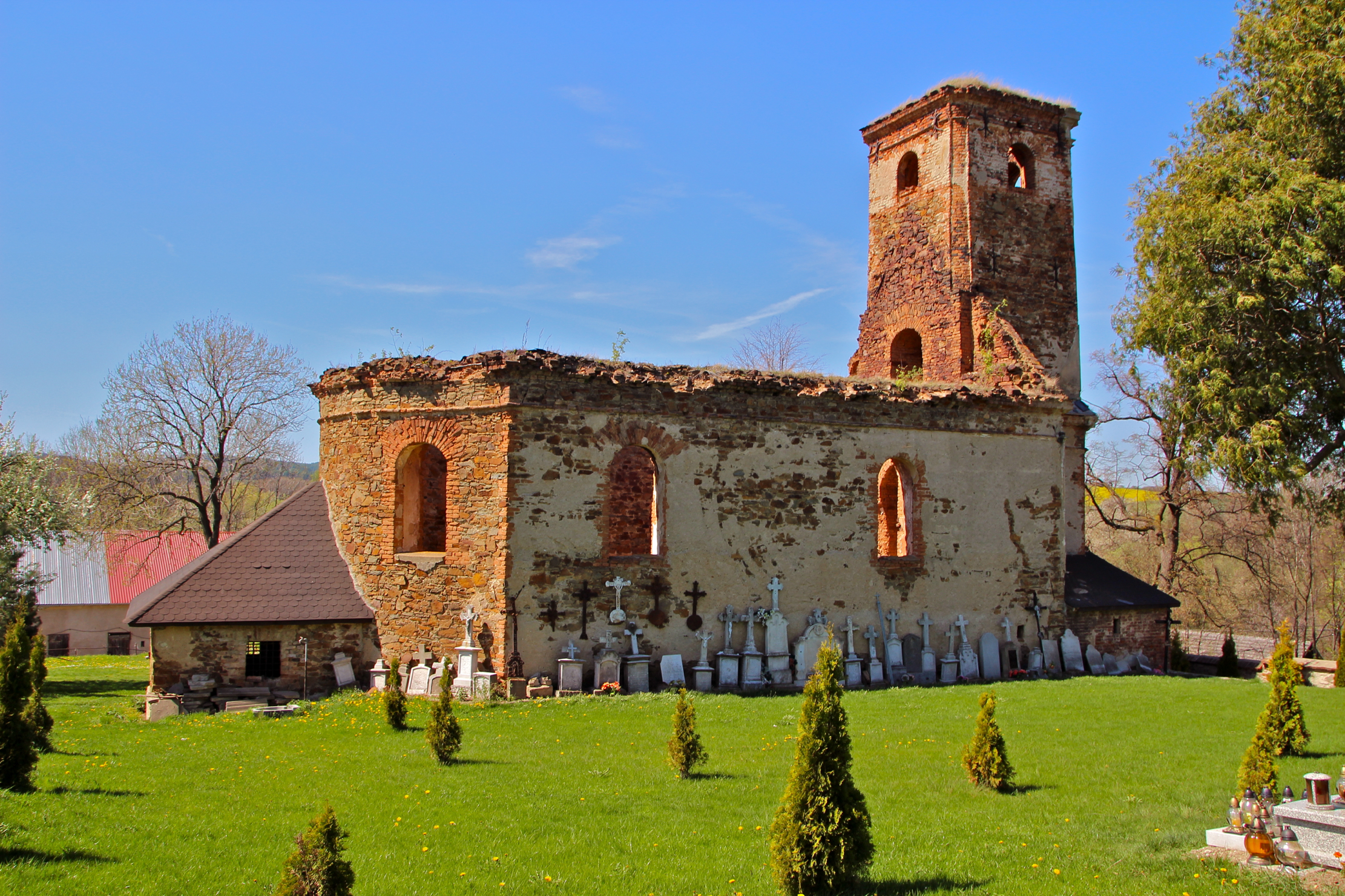
- Ruins of Saint Joseph's Church

- Location within Poland
- Coordinates: 50°10′35″N 17°39′39″E
- Country: Poland
- Voivodeship: Opole Voivodeship
- County: Głubczyce
- Gmina: Głubczyce
- Time zone: UTC+1 (CET)
  - Summer (DST): UTC+2 (CEST)
- Area code: +48 77
- Car plates: OGL

Pielgrzymów [pjɛlˈɡʐɨmuf] (German: Pilgersdorf) is a village located in south-western Poland, within Głubczyce County, Opole Voivodeship, near the border with the Czech Republic.

== History ==
The present-day Polish village Pielgrzymów and the present-day Czech former village Pelhřimovy, directly across the Czech side of the border, were once a single village, which was settled by Germans. After the Silesian Wars, the newly drawn border divided the village in two. By the Munich Agreement, the village parts were briefly reunited. However, after defeat of the Nazi regime, Czechoslovak authority over Pelhřimovy was re-established. By the implementation of the Oder-Neisse border, the Silesian part fell under Polish rule. In both villages, Germans were expelled for new Polish and Czech settlers to take their place. The Polish settlers came from Galicia, while Czech settlers were from Volhynia. The division continued through the Communist era of 1945–1989, and the border was not easily crossed until the two countries joined the Schengen Area in 2007.

This village partition led to an incident in 2020 during the COVID-19 pandemic, when the Polish Army entered some parts of the Czech village as a result of a misunderstanding. They "occupied" parts of the village for two weeks. During this time, several Czech citizens were unable to access the area, and the dilapidated chapel located some 30 meters behind the border.
