= Kietrz =

Town in Opole Voivodeship, Poland

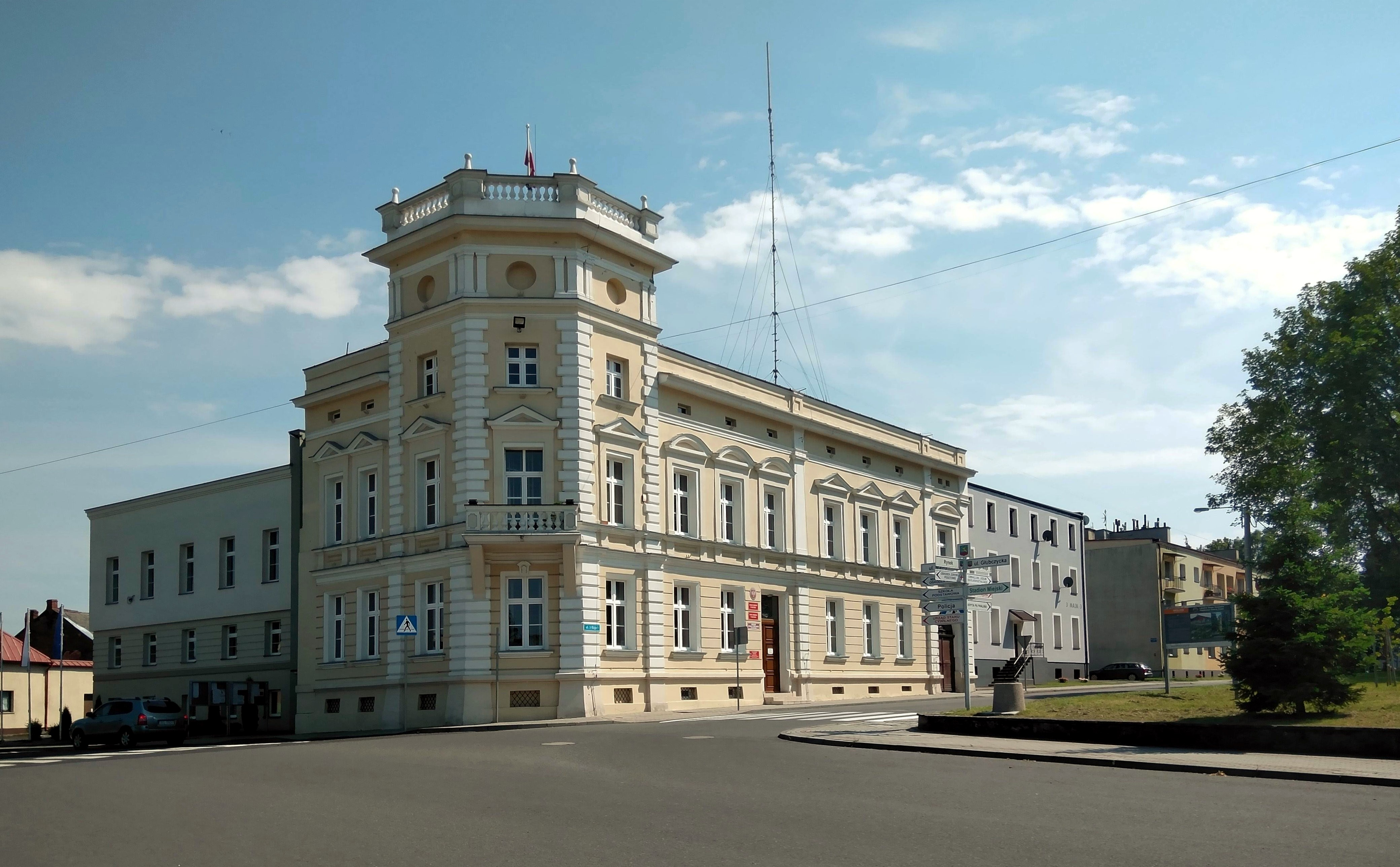
- Town Hall

- Flag Coat of arms
- Interactive map of Kietrz
- Location within Poland
- Coordinates: 50°4′45″N 18°0′32″E
- Country: Poland
- Voivodeship: Opole Voivodeship
- County: Głubczyce
- Town rights: 1321

Area
  - Total: 18.87 km^{2} (7.29 sq mi)

Population (2019-06-30)
  - Total: 6,005
  - Density: 318.2/km^{2} (824.2/sq mi)
- Time zone: UTC+1 (CET)
  - Summer (DST): UTC+2 (CEST)
- Postal codes: 48-130, 48-133
- Area code: +48 77
- Vehicle registration: OGL
- Website: http://www.kietrz.pl

Kietrz ([kʲɛtʂ]; Czech: Ketř) is a town in Głubczyce County, Opole Voivodeship, in southern Poland, near the border with the Czech Republic. As of 2019, it has a population of 6,005.

== History ==
It was granted town rights in 1321.

During World War II, in 1941, Nazi Germany established the Stalag 338 and Stalag 348 prisoner-of-war camps for Polish and French POWs, which, however, were soon relocated to Kryvyi Rih and Rzeszów, respectively. From 1942 to 1945, the Germans operated a Polenlager forced labour camp for Poles in the town. In January 1945, a German-conducted death march of prisoners of the Auschwitz concentration camp and its subcamps passed through the town.

== Sights ==
Kietrz contains several Baroque structures, including the Saint Thomas church, the Holy Cross chapel and several religious statues at the central square and park.

== Notable people ==
- Alfons Luczny (1894–1986), Luftwaffe general
- Olga Tokarczuk (born 1962), Polish writer, Nobel laureate

== Twin towns – sister cities ==
See twin towns of Gmina Kietrz.
