= List of Czech exonyms for places in Germany =

This is a list of Czech language exonyms for cities, towns, municipalities, islands, rivers, etc. in Germany. Note that due to the complex Czech-German history, several listed names in eastern Germany have been in actual use as native names, and are thus not exonyms.

== Settlements ==
- Aachen Cáchy
- Altenburg Starohrad
- Bad Doberan Dobřany
- Bad Kissingen Chýžice
- Bad Muskau Mužakov
- Bad Schandau Žandov
- Bautzen Budyšín
- Bayerisch Eisenstein Bavorská Železná Ruda
- Bayreuth Barout
- Bischofswerda Biskupice
- Brandenburg an der Havel Braniboř
- Braunschweig Brunšvik
- Bremen Brémy
- Bremerhaven Brémský Přístav
- Buchloe Buchlov
- Cham Kouba
- Chemnitz Kamenice/Saská Kamenice
- Cottbus Chotěbuz
- Crimmitschau Křemeničov
- Dohna Donín
- Dresden Drážďany
- Erlangen Erlanky
- Flöha Vlha
- Frankfurt am Main Frankfurt nad Mohanem
- Furth im Wald Brod nad Lesy
- Glauchau Hluchov
- Göppingen Gopinky
- Görlitz Zhořelec
- Göttingen Gotinky
- Guben Hubno
- Herrnhut Ochranov
- Hoyerswerda Hojeřice
- Köln Kolín nad Rýnem
- Köpenick Kopník
- Königstein Králův Kámen
- Konstanz Kostnice
- Leipzig Lipsko
- Linz am Rhein Linec nad Rýnem
- Löbau Lubij
- Lübben (Spreewald) Lubín
- Lübbenau Lubínov
- Lübeck Lubek/Bukovec
- Magdeburg Magdeburk
- Mainz Mohuč
- Marktredwitz Ředvice
- Meerane Morany
- Meißen Míšeň
- Merseburg Meziboř
- Mühlberg an der Elbe Milberk nad Labem
- München Mnichov
- Nauen Navno
- Neubrandenburg Nový Braniboř
- Neustadt an der Waldnaab Nové Město nad Nábou
- Neustrelitz Nové Střelice
- Niesky Nizký
- Nürnberg Norimberk
- Oelsnitz (Vogtland) Olešnice nad Halštrovem
- Oelsnitz (Erzgebirge) Saská Olešnice
- Oranienburg Bocov
- Oschatz Ožice
- Oybin Ojvin
- Peitz Picno
- Pirna Perno
- Plauen Plavno
- Potsdam Postupim
- Prenzlau Přemyslav
- Regen Řezná
- Regensburg Řezno
- Riesa Řezov
- Rostock Roztoky
- Schlettau Slatina
- Schweinfurt Sviní Brod/Svinibrod
- Schwerin Zvěřín
- Speyer Špýr
- Straubing Štrubina
- Trier Trevír
- Tübingen Tubinky
- Usedom Uznojm
- Waldsassen Valdsasy
- Wangen im Allgäu Vanky
- Weimar Výmar
- Wolgast Bolehošť
- Zeitz Žíč
- Zerbst Srbiště
- Zittau Žitava
- Zwiesel Svízel

== Other ==
- Alster Alstera (river)
- Chemnitz Kamenice (river)
- Donau Dunaj (river) (Note: Only partially located in Germany.)
- Ems Emže (river)
- Havel Havola (river)
- Klosterwasser Klášterní voda (river)
- Main Mohan (river)
- Naab Nába (river)
- Peene Pěna (river)
- Rote Weißeritz Červená Bystřice (river)
- Rhein Rýn (river)
- Rheinland Porýní
- Rügen Rujána (island)
- Schwarze Elster Černý Halštrov (river)
- Spreewald Sprévský les (forest)
- Unstrut Unstruta (river)
- Usedom Uznojem (island)
- Weser Vezera (river)
- Zwickauer Mulde Cvikovská Mulda (river)

== See also ==
- Czech exonyms
- List of European exonyms

== Bibliography ==
- Rank, Josef (1871). Nový slovník kapesní jazyka českého i německého (in Czech and German). Prague.
