= Ringelsdorf-Niederabsdorf =

- Municipality
- Coat of arms

- Location within Austria
- Coordinates: 48°34′N 16°52′E
- Country: Austria
- State: Lower Austria
- District: Gänserndorf

Government
  - Mayor: Wolfgang Weigert

Area
  - Total: 32.47 km^{2} (12.54 sq mi)
- Elevation: 170 m (560 ft)

Population (2018-01-01)
  - Total: 1,260
  - Density: 38.8/km^{2} (101/sq mi)
- Time zone: UTC+1 (CET)
  - Summer (DST): UTC+2 (CEST)
- Postal code: 2272
- Area code: 02536

Ringelsdorf-Niederabsdorf is a town in the district of Gänserndorf in the Austrian state of Lower Austria.

== Geography ==
Ringelsdorf-Niederabsdorf lies in the eastern Weinviertel on the Zaya River, exactly at the meeting of the borders with Slovakia and the Czech Republic. About 15.68 percent of the municipality is forested.
