= Krasne Pole, Głubczyce County =

Krasne Pole
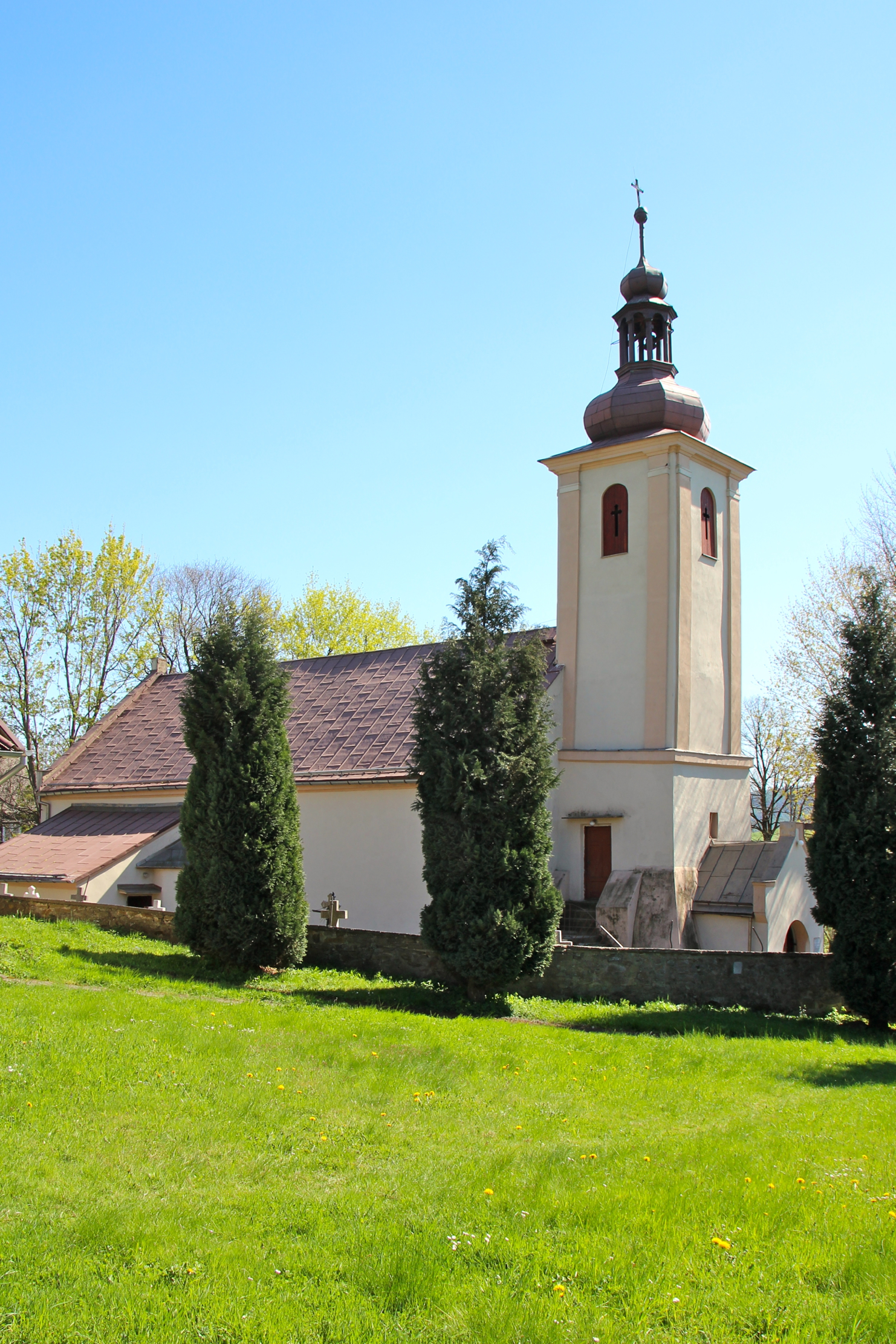

- Location within Poland
- Coordinates: 50°7′26″N 17°38′49″E
- Country: Poland
- Voivodeship: Opole
- County: Głubczyce
- Gmina: Głubczyce
- Time zone: UTC+1 (CET)
  - Summer (DST): UTC+2 (CEST)
- Area code: +48 77
- Car plates: OGL

Krasne Pole [ˈkrasnɛ ˈpɔlɛ] is a village located in Poland, in the Opole Voivodeship, Głubczyce County and Gmina Głubczyce, near the border with the Czech Republic. It is approximately 16 km (10 mi) south-west of Głubczyce and 64 km (40 mi) south of the regional capital Opole.

== History ==
The present-day Polish village Krasne Pole and the present-day Czech village Krásné Loučky, directly across the Czech border, were once a single village. After the Silesian Wars, the newly drawn border divided the village in two. The division continued through the Communist era of 1945–1990, and the border was not easily crossed until the two countries joined the Schengen Area in 2007.
