= Gmina Kietrz =

Gmina Kietrz Kietrz Commune
- Gmina
- Flag Coat of arms
- Interactive map of Gmina Kietrz
- Coordinates (Kietrz): 50°4′45″N 18°0′32″E
- Country: Poland
- Voivodeship: Opole
- County: Głubczyce
- Seat: Kietrz

Area
  - Total: 139.93 km^{2} (54.03 sq mi)

Population (2019-06-30)
  - Total: 10,899
  - Density: 77.889/km^{2} (201.73/sq mi)
  - Urban: 6,005
  - Rural: 4,894
- Time zone: UTC+1 (CET)
  - Summer (DST): UTC+2 (CEST)
- Vehicle registration: OGL
- Website: http://www.kietrz.pl

Gmina Kietrz is an urban-rural gmina (administrative district) in Głubczyce County, Opole Voivodeship, in southern Poland, on the Czech border. Its seat is the town of Kietrz, which lies approximately 19 kilometres (12 mi) south-east of Głubczyce and 66 km (41 mi) south of the regional capital Opole.

The gmina covers an area of 139.93 square kilometres (54.0 sq mi), and as of 2019, its total population was 10,899.

== Location ==
Gmina Kietrz is bordered by the gminas of Baborów, Branice, Głubczyce and Pietrowice Wielkie. It also borders the Czech Republic.

== Twin towns – sister cities ==
Gmina Kietrz is twinned with:

- Bílovec, Czech Republic
- Oldřišov, Czech Republic
- Tysmenytsia, Ukraine
