= Otto Bovensiepen =

German lawyer, policeman and SS officer

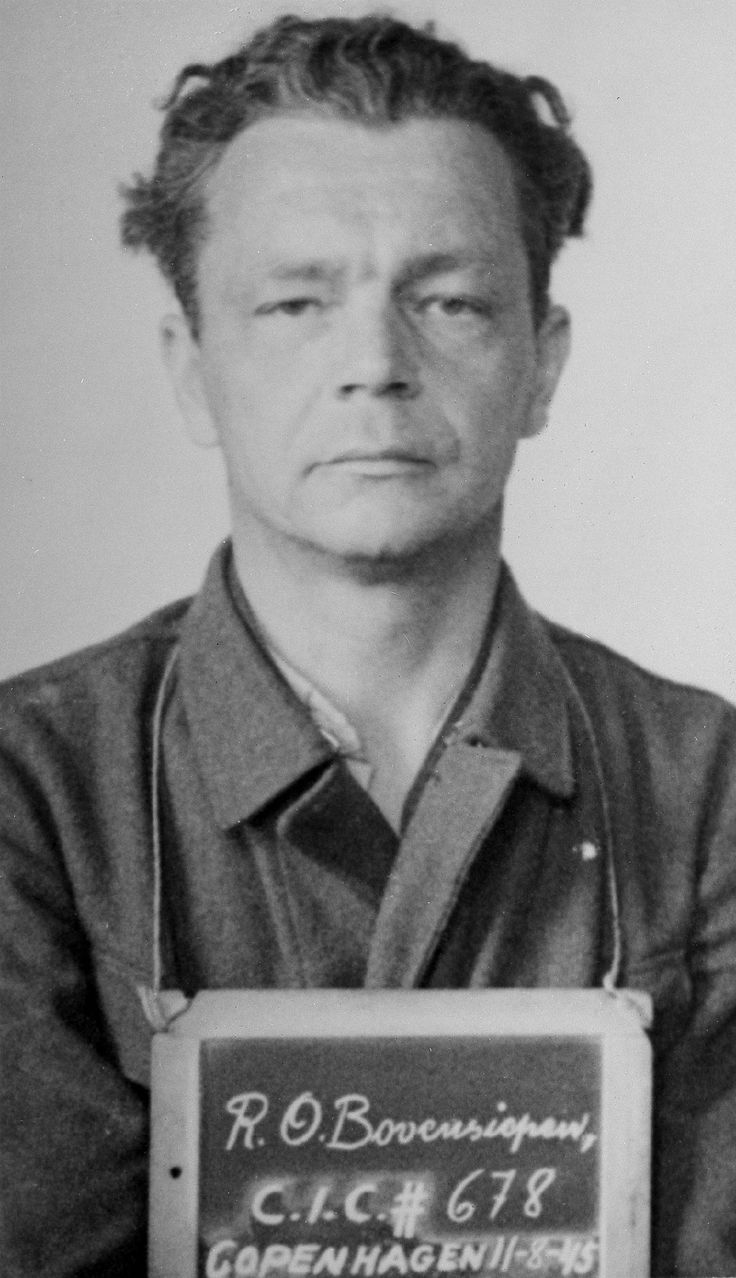
- Bovensiepen in custody at Copenhagen, 11 August 1945
- Born: 8 July 1905; Duisburg, Rhine Province, Kingdom of Prussia, German Empire
- Died: 18 February 1979 (age 73); Zusmarshausen, Bavaria, West Germany
- Education: University of Bonn
- Military career
- Allegiance: Nazi Germany
- Branch: Schutzstaffel
- Service years: 1936–1945
- Rank: SS-Standartenführer
- Unit: Reich Security Main Office
- Commands: Gestapo chief of Berlin; Inspector of SiPo and SD, Kassel; Commander of SiPo and SD, occupied Denmark
- Conflicts: World War II

Richard Otto Bovensiepen (8 July 1905 – 18 February 1979) was a German lawyer and police official who headed the Gestapo in several German cities, including Berlin. He also was an SS-Standartenführer who served as the Commander of the Security Police and the SD in occupied Denmark from January 1944 until the end of the Second World War in May 1945. He was tried and sentenced to death for war crimes in Denmark in 1948, but his sentence was commuted and he was released by a general amnesty in 1953. A subsequent prosecution in Germany for the deportation of Jews to extermination camps was dismissed in 1971 due to his poor health.

== Early life ==
Bovensiepen was born in Duisburg and, after graduating from high school in 1925, studied law at the University of Bonn where he was a member of the Bonn student corp Bonner Burschenschaft Frankonia. While still a student, he joined the Nazi Party on 3 May 1926 (membership number 35,782). He passed his first state law examination on 22 October 1929, and the second on 15 July 1933. He was employed as a court Assessor at the Duisburg district court and as a legal assistant in the Finance and Tax Department of the Duisburg city government. He eventually attained the rank of Oberregierungsrat (senior government councilor) in the civil service.

== Gestapo and SS career in Germany ==
On 15 November 1933, Bovensiepen joined the Gestapo at the Düsseldorf police headquarters. That month, he also joined the Sturmabteilung, the Nazi Party's paramilitary unit. On 24 June 1934, he was appointed acting chief of the Magdeburg Gestapo headquarters, becoming the permanent director on 1 August. On 5 February 1935, he was transferred to become the chief of the Recklinghausen police headquarters. After similarly heading the Dortmund, Bielefeld, and Köslin state police forces, Bovensiepen, who joined the SS on 1 November 1936 (SS number 280,071), was commissioned as an SS-Untersturmführer on 20 April 1937 and headed the Halle police headquarters from 1 October 1937 to 17 March 1941. In March 1938, shortly after the Anschluss with Austria, he was charged with establishing the new Gestapo office in Eisenstadt. He remained there until August and then returned to his permanent post in Halle.

Bovensiepen was promoted to SS-Sturmbannführer on 15 February 1941 and, on 18 March, was assigned to Berlin where he headed the largest Gestapo office in the Reich and soon was promoted to SS-Obersturmbannführer on 20 April. Bovensiepen played a leading role in tracking down communist resistance groups in the city, and was known to advocate "enhanced interrogations" to break communist resistance groups. His next advancement came when Reinhard Heydrich, chief of the Reich Security Main Office (RSHA), appointed him Deputy Inspekteur der Sicherheitspolizei und des SD (IdS) in Berlin in December 1941. He remained in Berlin until Ernst Kaltenbrunner, Heydrich's successor as the RSHA chief, next appointed him provisionally on 30 April 1943, and permanently on 2 October 1943, as IdS for Wehrkreis IX in Kassel. He was promoted to SS-Standartenführer and Oberst of police, effective 9 November 1943.

== Police and intelligence chief in Denmark ==
In January 1944, Bovensiepen, was named the Befehlshaber der Sicherheitspolizei und des SD (BdS – Commander of the Security Police and the SD) in occupied Denmark. He succeeded Rudolf Mildner who had been dismissed for failing to prevent the escape to Sweden by sea of the great majority of Danish Jews. Bovensiepen set about fighting the Danish resistance movement with counter-terror and counter-sabotage tactics, and later admitted during interrogation that he had ordered "the application of torture in certain cases" involving figures who were hostile to Nazi rule in Denmark, in order to "get a confession out of a prisoner if a speedy clarification of a matter was necessary". Bovensiepen explained that the previous BdS was not rigorous enough in the application of counter-terrorism actions, and that the orders for more vigorous action had come from Adolf Hitler himself, who was dissatisfied with the situation in Denmark and ordered a change of leadership. Bovensiepen admitted to personally ordering torture in 2 instances, and when asked whether he believed his actions were permitted by the rules of war, he stated that he was obeying orders he had received, and that in Germany "the orders of the Führer could not be debated".

== Postwar life and prosecutions ==
Captured after the Germany's surrender in May 1945, Bovensiepen was brought to trial in Copenhagen District Court in what became known as the Großer Kriegsverbrecherprozess (Kopenhagen) (Great War Crimes Trial) and was sentenced to death on 20 September 1948. On appeal, the sentence was commuted to life imprisonment on 17 March 1950. Bovensiepen was released on 1 December 1953 as part of a general amnesty and returned to Germany. He obtained employment in a leading West German insurance company in Mülheim an der Ruhr and rose to the post of managing director.

In 1963, the Berlin public prosecutor's office began investigated Bovensiepen for the deportation of more than 40,000 German Jews to the ghettos in occupied eastern Europe and to the extermination camps during his tenure as Gestapo chief in Berlin. The trial against Bovensiepen and two other defendants before the Berlin Regional Court began in December 1969. During the proceedings, Bovensiepen suffered a heart attack and the trial was suspended. He was declared unfit to face trial by a number of medical experts in 1970. The trial proceedings finally were dismissed on 19 November 1971 due to permanent incapacity to stand trial. Bovensiepen died in February 1979 at Zusmarshausen.

== See also ==
- Rescue of the Danish Jews

== Sources ==
- Klee, Ernst (2007). Das Personenlexikon zum Dritten Reich. Wer war was vor und nach 1945. Frankfurt-am-Main: Fischer-Taschenbuch-Verlag. ISBN 978-3-596-16048-8.
- McDonough, Frank (2017). The Gestapo: the Myth and Reality of Hitler's Secret Police. New York: Skyhorse Publishing. ISBN 978-3-596-16048-8.
