= Anton Dunckern =

German Nazi SS general and police official

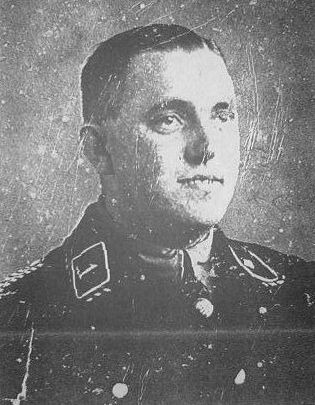
- Anton Dunckern c. 1933–1937
- Born: 29 June 1905; Munich, Kingdom of Bavaria, German Empire
- Died: 9 December 1985 (aged 80); Munich, West Germany
- Education: Ludwig-Maximilians-Universität München
- Military career
- Allegiance: Weimar Republic; Nazi Germany
- Branch: Freikorps; Schutzstaffel
- Service years: 1922–1923; 1930–1945
- Rank: SS-Brigadeführer
- Units: Gestapo; Sicherheitspolizei (SiPo) and Sicherheitsdienst (SD)
- Commands: Inspekteur SiPo and SD, Wehrkreis XI; Commander Einsatzgruppe II; Commander SiPo and SD, Lorraine-Saarpfalz; SS and Police Leader, Metz
- Conflicts: World War II
- Criminal information
- Convictions: French Military; War crimes
- Penalty: 20 years hard labor

Anton Leonhard Dunckern (29 June 1905 – 9 December 1985) was a German lawyer and Nazi Party member. He joined the SS and rose to the rank of SS-Brigadeführer. During the Second World War, he commanded the German security police and SS intelligence service in Lorraine. As the SS and police leader in Metz, he was taken prisoner when the city was liberated by the Allies. He was tried as a war criminal in France in 1953 and received a sentence of 20 years at hard labor but obtained an early release.

== Early life ==
Dunckern was born in Munich, the son of a judicial bailiff. He grew up in Munich and attended the local Volksschule and Gymnasium. Early on in life Dunckern got involved in far right-wing politics. In 1922, when he was seventeen, he joined the Freikorps Lauterbach, an association of volunteers serving as auxiliaries to the regular Reichswehr, where he met Heinrich Himmler. They became close friends at that time, remaining on a first-name basis for the rest of their lives. In 1923, Dunckern became a member of the Freikorps Oberland– an organization similar to the Corps of Hartmann Lauterbacher– with which he took part in Adolf Hitler's failed Beer Hall Putsch of November 1923. Dunckern then studied law at the Ludwig-Maximilians-Universität München, passing the first state examination in 1930. He completed a legal clerkship and passed the second state examination in early 1933.

== Career in the SS and police ==
In September 1930, Dunckern joined the Nazi Party and the Schutzstaffel (SS), which by that time was spearheaded by his friend Himmler. Being a personal friend of the Reichsführer-SS and a highly educated academician, Dunckern managed to advance swiftly within the ranks of the SS after the Nazi seizure of power in January 1933. During the coup that brought the Nazis to power in Bavaria in March 1933 Dunckern, on behalf of Himmler, commanded the SS troops that occupied and guarded the government buildings in Munich. In April, he was appointed as an officer in the Bavarian Political Police, which at that time was Himmler's power center within the state apparatus.

When Himmler and his deputy Reinhard Heydrich moved from Munich to Berlin in April 1934 to take control of the Gestapo, they took Dunckern along. In the following months, he participated in reorganizing the Gestapo in accordance with the plans of the SS-leaders, thus decisively contributing to consolidating their power.

During the Night of the Long Knives from 30 June to 2 July 1934, Dunckern played a key role in clamping down on his masters' adversaries in Berlin. He led the SS troop that occupied the offices of Hitler's conservative Vice-Chancellor, Franz von Papen. During this raid, Papen's chief of press, Herbert von Bose, the organiser of the political opposition to Nazi rule within the government apparatus, was shot and several other staffers were taken prisoner and taken to concentration camps. On the night of 30 June to 1 July, Dunckern led a group of Gestapo agents who tried to execute Paul Schulz, the disgraced former Nazi politician and protégé of Gregor Strasser, in a forest outside of Berlin. Schulz was arrested, taken into the Grunewald forest, and shot in the back. However, he survived his injuries, played dead, and then fled when his would-be killers turned away to fetch a tarpaulin for the body.

From July to December 1934, Dunckern reorganized the Gestapo in Breslau (today, Wrocław) and Liegnitz (today, Legnica) in Silesia. In March 1935, after the return of the Saar to Germany, he was appointed Gestapo chief in Saarbrücken in command of all the Gestapo within the area. In the spring of 1938, Dunckern was transferred to the Security Service Main Office in Berlin where he worked directly under Heydrich. On 1 February 1939, he was appointed Commander of the SD-Oberabschnitt "Mitte" in Braunschweig, followed a few weeks later by appointment as the Inspekteur der Sicherheitspolizei und des SD (Inspector of the Security Police and the SD) for Wehrkreis (military district) XI supervising all the security police and the SS intelligence service in his area.

=== War service in France ===
In July 1940, after the fall of France, Dunckern led Einsatzgruppe II and then was appointed Befehlshaber der Sicherheitspolizei und des SD (Commander of the Security Police and the SD) in Saar-Lorraine, renamed Lorraine-Saarpfalz in October. In 1942, he was promoted to the rank of SS-Brigadeführer.

Following the Allied invasion of Europe in the summer of 1944, Himmler elevated Dunckern to SS and police leader and placed him in charge of the defence of Metz in October 1944. During the liberation of Metz by American troops of the 3rd US Army on the night of 19 November 1944 Dunckern was taken prisoner. Due to the fact that Dunckern by that time was the highest-ranking SS officer to have been captured within his area of command, General George Patton took it upon himself to interrogate the prisoner personally. Patton, deciding that Dunckern was a "viper" and a "low type" of policeman, had him classified as a political detainee instead of a prisoner of war.

== Post-war life and prosecution ==
Until early April 1945, Dunckern was kept as a prisoner in England. Afterward, he was transferred to a camp for captured generals in the US. In the summer of 1946, Dunckern was returned to Europe. From the summer of 1946 until the autumn of 1947, he was imprisoned in a camp for generals in Garmisch in southern Germany. He subsequently was imprisoned in a military penitentiary in Metz until the spring of 1953. From 31 May to 1 July 1953, Dunckern was tried as a war criminal before the French Military Court of the 6th Region in Metz. He was convicted and sentenced to 20 years of hard labor.

In June 1954, Dunckern was granted an early release from a prison in the Loos, Nord district of Lille. He returned to Germany, where he settled in Munich, opening a law firm in 1956. Following a severe encephalitis attack in 1962 he became paraplegic. Due to his old age and feeble health, he gave up his law license in 1970.

In 1970 and 1971, the district attorney in Munich investigated Dunckern due to the suspicion that he had aided mass killing in his capacity as chief of police in Metz during the war. Specifically, it was alleged that the forces commanded by Dunckern had been involved in the deportation of French Jews to death camps in Eastern Europe from 1942 to 1944. Since Dunckern denied the charges and, since no evidence could be uncovered proving the opposite, the investigation was discontinued in May 1971.

Dunckern died in 1985 following a lengthy ailment. He is buried in the Ostfriedhof (eastern graveyard) of Munich. In accordance with his instructions, Dunckern's sister burned all his private papers after his death.

== Sources ==
- Dieter Wolfanger: „Der erste Gestapo-Chef des Saarlandes und spätere Befehlshaber der Sicherheitspolizei und des SD in Lothringen-Saarpfalz“, in: Jahrbuch für westdeutsche Landesgeschichte 18 (1992), pp. 303–324.
- Ernst Klee: Das Personenlexikon zum Dritten Reich, Frankfurt 2007, p. 122.
- Andreas Schulz/Günter Wegmann Die Generale der Waffen-SS und der Polizei Biblio Verlag 2003 Band 1, pp. 264–266.
