= Humbert Achamer-Pifrader =

Bohemian colonel and Nazi SS member (1900–1945)

Oberführer Humbert Achamer-Pifrader
- Born: Humbert Achamer-Pifrader; 21 November 1900; Teplitz-Schönau, Bohemia, Austria-Hungary
- Died: 25 April 1945 (aged 44); Linz, Austria, Greater German Reich
- Military career
- Allegiance: Austria-Hungary; Austria; Nazi Germany
- Branch: Schutzstaffel
- Rank: SS-Oberführer
- Commands: Inspector of SiPo and SD, Wiesbaden; Commander, Einsatzgruppe A Commander of SiPo and SD, Riga
- Conflicts: World War I; Italian Front; World War II †
- Awards: German Cross; Iron Cross; War Merit Cross

Humbert Achamer-Pifrader (21 November 1900 – 25 April 1945) was an Austrian jurist who was also a member of the SS. He was commander of Einsatzgruppe A from September 1942 to September 1943.

== Biography ==
Achamer-Pifrader was born in Teplitz-Schönau. His mother was Elisabeth Pifrader. Achamer-Pifrader fought on the Italian Front in World War I as a one-year volunteer. He was positioned by Otto Steinhäusl in the police headquarters in Salzburg in 1926, and transferred to the civil service after two years of military and technical training. In addition to his professional activities, he began to study law and political science at the University of Innsbruck and received his doctorate of law there on 7 July 1934.

Achamer-Pifrader joined the Austrian Nazi Party on 10 November 1931 (membership number 614,104). In June 1935, he fled to the German Reich because of the Nazi ban in Austria, where he entered the service of the Bavarian Political Police immediately. In early September 1935, he joined the SS (membership number 275,750) and rose steadily in this Nazi organization. In April 1936, he was transferred to the Gestapo in Berlin, where he worked on "Austrian affairs".

After the beginning of the Second World War, Achamer-Pifrader was head of the Gestapo in Darmstadt. He was promoted to SS-Standartenführer in 1941. From July 1942, he was the Inspekteur der Sicherheitspolizei und des SD (Inspector of Security Police and SD), headquartered in Wiesbaden. In September 1942, he became, in succession to Franz Walter Stahlecker and Heinz Jost, commander of Einsatzgruppe A, which was responsible for the mass murder of (mostly Jewish) civilians. In addition, he was the Befehlshaber der Sicherheitspolizei und des SD (Commander of the Security Police and SD) in Riga during that time.

Achamer-Pifrader was promoted to SS-Oberführer on 1 January 1943, and on 31 August 1943, awarded with the Iron Cross 2nd Class and also the War Merit Cross, 1st class. In September 1943, he returned to the Reich Security Main Office (RSHA) as Inspector of the Security Police and the SD in Berlin. In 1944, he took over as chief of the Security Police field units of RSHA Unit IV B. During the assassination attempt against Adolf Hitler on 20 July 1944, Achamer-Pifrader was sent by RSHA to the Bendlerblock where the conspirators were gathered with orders to question Claus von Stauffenberg about his abrupt departure from the Wolf's Lair, but he was arrested there at 5:30 p.m. by the conspirators. After the failure of the coup, he was involved in the investigations and arrests of the conspirators. He was awarded the German Cross in silver for his efforts.

On 25 April 1945, Achamer-Pifrader died in an air raid on Linz.

Achamer-Pifrader married Maria Hauser (born 1906 in Salzburg) in 1929, with whom he had three children.

== Literature ==
- Helmut Krausnick / Hans-Heinrich Wilhelm: Die Truppe des Weltanschauungskrieges, DVA, Stuttgart 1981 ISBN 3-421-01987-8.
