= Heinrich Seetzen =

German SS officer (1906–1945)

- Born: June 22, 1906; Rüstringen, Grand Duchy of Oldenburg, German Empire
- Died: 28 September 1945 (aged 39); Hamburg-Blankenese, British occupation zone in Germany
- Education: University of Marburg; University of Kiel
- Military career
- Allegiance: Nazi Germany
- Branch: Schutzstaffel
- Service years: 1935–1945
- Rank: SS-Standartenführer
- Unit: Gestapo
- Commands: Sonderkommando 10a Inspekteur der Sicherheitspolizei und des SD, Kassel; Breslau; Einsatzgruppe B Befehlshaber der Sicherheitspolizei und des SD, "Rußland-Mitte und Weißruthenien"
- Conflicts: World War II
- Awards: Iron Cross, second class War Merit Cross, 1st class with swords

Heinrich Otto Seetzen, also known as Heinz Seetzen, (22 June 1906 – 28 September 1945) was a German lawyer, police official and member of the Nazi Schutzstaffel (SS) who rose to the rank of SS-Standartenführer and Oberst of police. He headed several Gestapo offices in Nazi Germany and was the Inspector for the security police (SiPo) and the intelligence service (SD) in two military districts. During the Second World War, he was a perpetrator of the Holocaust, responsible for the mass murder of civilians in Ukraine and in Belarus. At the end of the war, he lived for several months under an assumed name but he was arrested and committed suicide while in custody.

== Early life ==
Seetzen was born in 1906 as the only child of a delicatessen owner in Rüstringen, that is today part of Wilhelmshaven. While still a student, he joined the Jungstahlhelm, the youth group of the antisemitic and nationalistic German veterans' organization. After earning his Abitur in 1925, Seetzen studied law at the University of Marburg and the University of Kiel. While at Marburg, he joined the ultra-nationalist and racially exclusive Turnerschaft Philippina-Saxonia Marburg duelling fraternity. After passing his Referendar examination in 1929, he clerked at various law courts and met district judge Anton Franzen, a local Nazi Party politician in Kiel. Through him, Seetzen first came into contact with National Socialist ideas and began to regularly attend Party events while studying in Kiel through 1932. Around this time, he also became friends with Reinhard Heydrich who was working to establish the Party's intelligence service.

After the Nazi seizure of power, and after passing his Assessor examination, Seetzen joined the Nazi Party (membership number 2,732,725) and its paramilitary unit, the Sturmabteilung (SA) on 1 May 1933. After an unsuccessful bid to be appointed to the post of Bürgermeister of Eutin, the unemployed Seetzen took a job as an assistant to SA-Brigadeführer Heinrich Böhmcker, the Regierungspräsident of the Eutin region (Landesteil Lübeck). Seetzen was placed in charge of the region's concentration camps at Eutin and Ahrensbök in September 1933, where at least 345 persons– mostly Communists but also Social Democrats and trade unionists– were placed into "protective custody". He was responsible for the labour deployment of the inmates. In consultation with Böhmcker, he decided whether and when they could be released and, in May 1934, he oversaw the final closure of the Eutin camp. In March 1934, Seetzen was appointed chief of the state police office (Leiter der Staatspolizeistelle) in Eutin.

== Gestapo service in Germany ==
Seetzen joined the Gestapo on 15 February 1935. He transferred from the SA into the Schutzstaffel (SS) with membership number 267,231 and he was assigned to the SD-Hauptamt (main office), headed by his friend Heydrich. He was commissioned an SS-Untersturmführer on 27 June 1935 and promoted to SS-Obersturmführer on 13 September 1936. He was assigned to head the Gestapo office in Aachen on 1 April 1935, and became a Regierungs Assessor (government attorney) six months later. He remained in Aachen until March 1938, gaining permanent civil servant status as a Regierungsrat (government councilor) on 30 January 1938 when he was advanced over the heads of some nineteen more senior officials. Following the Anschluss of March 1938, he was temporarily detailed to Vienna to help set up the Gestapo operation there. He was involved in acquiring what had been Jewish-owned properties to house Gestapo personnel and, on 1 August 1938, he skipped a rank when he was promoted directly to SS-Sturmbannfuhrer.

Seetzen returned to Aachen in the summer of 1938 and was there to oversee the Kristallnacht pogrom on 9–10 November, when 268 Jews from the Aachen area were arrested and some were beaten and interned in the Buchenwald and Sachsenhausen concentration camps. At the beginning of March 1939, Seetzen was transferred to the main Baltic Sea port of Stettin (today, Szczecin) where for the remainder of that year he headed the Staatspolizeileitstelle, (state police main office) a step up in authority from Aachen. On 1 January 1940, he took command of the Staatspolizeileitstelle in Hamburg, Germany's second largest urban center, where he remained nominally in charge until September 1942, though his deputy acted in his place when he was on assignment in the east. On 21 June 1940, he received an advancement to Oberregierungsrat (senior government councilor). On 1 July 1940, he was promoted to SS-Obersturmbannfuhrer.

== Wartime service and Holocaust actions ==
At the time of the invasion of the Soviet Union in June 1941, Seetzen was selected as the commander of Sonderkommando 10a, a sub-unit of Otto Ohlendorf's Einsatzgruppe D, which followed Army Group South and was responsible for mass killings in Ukraine. Seetzen was also installed to serve as the de facto deputy commander of the entire Einsatzgruppe. In his biographical essay on Seetzen's life, historian Lawrence D. Stokes provided a detailed description of Seetzen's direct involvement in the mass killings, based on multiple eyewitness accounts:

Seetzen knew before crossing the Rumanian frontier that he and his men would be engaging in acts of mass murder, if not perhaps in outright genocide. Moreover, he took direct part himself in these actions. For example, at Belzy in Bessarabia on 15 July 1941 Seetzen helped the police and Waffen-SS to execute the city's entire council of Jewish elders. A few days later he instructed a section of SK 10a at Kodyma to co-operate with the Wehrmacht in shooting around 100 Jews who allegedly belonged to the Communist Party. The first Jewish women and children were killed along with males, around 200 persons in all, by Seetzen and his unit in August on a collective farm near Beresovka. In the steppe region north of Odessa they murdered whole families whose bodies were pushed down a dried-up well … [Seetzen] ordering some victims thrown alive into the deep hole. The number of those massacred at each site on his command steadily escalated: 1,000 at Berdjansk, 2,000 at Melitopol around 8 October 1941, and four times that many Jews in the city of Mariupol before the end of the same month. Seetzen was frequently described wearing a warm-up suit, standing like a general on a mound of earth beside an anti-tank ditch with a cigar in his mouth, and firing his machine pistol at the helpless people lying naked on top of one another in the pit. Afterwards he could calmly sit down at his headquarters to enjoy a good meal.

After quitting Rostov-on-the-Don with the retreating Wehrmacht at the end of November, Sonderkommando 10a spent the winter months of 1941-42 in Taganrog on the Sea of Azov. There it received a gas van to facilitate the killing operations while easing the psychological strain on the murderers. According to one driver with the unit, Seetzen "maliciously" laughed at the screaming and banging of those locked in the vehicle as it drove off with the exhaust fumes engulfing them. When SK 10a was able to return to Rostov in summer 1942 he set up a Jewish council (Judenrat) to assist in registering the 1,500-2,000 members of the community who had not escaped with the Red Army. They were then transported to a ravine outside the city where Seetzen and a firing squad gunned them down. Altogether, over the space of little more than a year he and his unit brutally executed at least 15,000 innocent human beings, most of them Jews but also Soviet prisoners of war, civilian hostages, real or alleged partisans, Gypsies, and others.

On 13 July 1942, Seetzen returned to Germany and, on 18 August, he was promoted to SS-Standartenführer and Oberst of police. He simultaneously was appointed the Inspekteur der Sicherheitspolizei und des SD (IdS) for Wehrkreis IX, headquartered in Kassel. His duties, in addition to supervising the work of the Gestapo, KriPo and SD units under his command, included ideological training and recruitment in his locality, setting up and controlling so-called "labor education camps" for foreign workers, overseeing the evacuation of Jews and others to the east, and tracking down– and sometimes executing– escaped prisoners of war. In May 1943, Seetzen was transferred to the IdS position in Wehrkreis VIII in Breslau (today, Wrocław). From the start of this new appointment, he was deeply involved in the coercive measures taken against Poles and Jews in Silesia. Among the places that fell within his jurisdiction was Auschwitz extermination camp, and he is documented as personally having made at least four trips there. Seetzen also had a connection to the reprisals that were ordered in response to the "Great Escape" of seventy-six Allied airmen in Sagan (today, Żagań) on 24 March 1944. Adolf Hitler ordered fifty of the escapees shot upon recapture as a deterrent to other prisoners. It was Gestapo and KriPo personnel who were assigned to Seetzen's IdS command in Breslau that performed most of the killings.

In April 1944, Seetzen was sent briefly to Prague as the commander of the security police (SiPo). He next returned to the eastern front on 28 April 1944 to serve as Befehlshaber der Sicherheitspolizei und des SD (BdS) for Rußland-Mitte (central Russia) and Weißruthenien. He concurrently served as the commander of Einsatzgruppe B, which perpetrated mass killings in Belarus. When it finally withdrew from Soviet soil in the summer of 1944, still killing as it went, the Einsatzgruppe is estimated to have massacred upwards of 150,000 persons, of whom at least two-thirds were Jews. Seetzen was replaced in these posts on 12 August 1944, when he was seriously wounded as his vehicle drove over a landmine. A few months later, he was awarded the Iron Cross, second class.

== Post-war arrest and suicide ==
After the war, Seetzen stayed with a female acquaintance, hiding his identity by using the alias "Michael Gollwitzer". His acquaintance reported that Seetzen was remorseful and completely finished from a moral perspective. He told her "that he was heavily burdened by guilt, that he was a criminal, and that he had essentially forfeited his life". He also openly admitted that he would commit suicide by taking potassium cyanide the moment he was captured.

The special investigation branch of the Royal Air Force was searching intensively for any Nazi officials who had been involved in the murders of the fifty escapees from Sagan. Seetzen was high on their list and they learned from a former SD colleague in Breslau that Seetzen was residing in the Hamburg area within the British occupation zone. The British military police located Seetzen in Hamburg-Blankenese on 28 September 1945. He gave his assumed name, but when he was taken into custody for questioning, he committed suicide using a cyanide capsule. In the absence of a positive identification, his body was buried as "Michael Gollwitzer" in a mass grave at Hamburg's Ohlsdorf Cemetery in October 1945. Since his status officially remained undetermined, a denazification court held a hearing in absentia, "in the event that the person concerned is still alive", and classified Seetzen as a "lesser offender" (Group III– Minderbelasteten) on 13 December 1949. He was formally identified by his widow six years after his death, on the basis of a photograph and the clothing he had been wearing when captured.

== SS and police ranks ==
SS and police ranks
Date	Rank
27 June 1935	SS-Untersturmführer
13 September 1936	SS-Obersturmführer
1 August 1938	SS-Sturmbannführer
1 July 1940	SS-Obersturmbannführer
18 August 1942	SS-Standartenführer und Oberst der Polizei

== Sources ==
- Apel, Linde: (2009) Hamburg Ministry of Culture, Sports and Media, in cooperation with the Research Center for Contemporary History in Hamburg and the Neuengamme Concentration Camp Memorial (eds.): In den Tod geschickt - Die Deportationen von Juden, Roma und Sinti aus Hamburg, 1940 bis 1945, Metropol Verlag, Hamburg.
- Klee, Ernst (2007). Das Personenlexikon zum Dritten Reich. Wer war was vor und nach 1945. Frankfurt-am-Main: Fischer-Taschenbuch-Verlag. ISBN 978-3-596-16048-8.
- Stokes, Lawrence D.: (April 2002) From Law Student to Einsatzgruppe Commander: The career of a Gestapo Officer, Canadian Journal of History, Volume 37, Issue 1, pp. 41–73.
- Stokes, Lawrence D.: (2004) Heinz Seetzen - Chef des Sonderkommandos 10a. In: Klaus-Michael Mallmann, Gerhard Paul (eds.): Karrieren der Gewalt. Nationalsozialistische Täterbiographien Wissenschaftliche Buchgesellschaft, Darmstadt, ISBN 3-534-16654-X.
