= Walther Bierkamp =

German Nazi lawyer and SS-Brigadeführer

- Born: 17 December 1901; Hamburg, German Empire
- Died: 15 May 1945 (age 43); Scharbeutz, Allied-occupied Germany
- Burial place: Waldfriedhof cemetery, Timmendorfer Strand
- Military career
- Allegiance: Nazi Germany
- Branch: Schutzstaffel
- Service years: 1939–1945
- Rank: SS-Brigadeführer
- Commands: Commander of SiPo and SD, "Belgium and Northern France," "General Government," "Südwest"; Commander, Einsatzgruppe D Acting Higher SS and Police Leader, "Südost"
- Conflicts: World War II
- Awards: War Merit Cross, 1st and 2nd class with Swords

Walther Karl Johannes Bierkamp (17 December 1901 – 15 May 1945), also sometimes spelled Walter Bierkamp, was a German Nazi lawyer and SS-Brigadeführer. During the Second World War, he served as the commander of the Sicherheitspolizei or SiPo (Security Police) and Sicherheitsdienst or SD (Security Service) in occupied Belgium and Northern France and later in occupied Poland and in Baden & Württemberg. He also commanded Einsatzgruppe D, in the occupied Soviet Union. He was involved in Holocaust-related war crimes in Poland and the North Caucasus area. After the end of the war in Europe, he committed suicide.

== Early life ==
Born in Hamburg, Bierkamp joined that city's far-right Freikorps Bahrenfeld and the following year he participated in the Kapp Putsch, in an attempt to overthrow the Weimar Republic. After studying law in Göttingen and Hamburg, he received his doctorate of law degree, passed his state examinations in 1928 and joined the civil service as a lawyer.

== First SS and police positions ==
Bierkamp joined the Nazi Party on 1 December 1932 (Party membership number 1,408,449). At the beginning of February 1937 he became a Senior Government Counselor (Oberregierungsrat), and the Director of the Kriminalpolizei (KriPo) in Hamburg. On 1 April 1939, he joined the Schutzstaffel (SS number 310,172). He was assigned to the SD Main Office until September when it was incorporated into the Reich Security Main Office (RSHA), headed by then SS-Gruppenführer Reinhard Heydrich. Bierkamp remained in RSHA at SS headquarters until he was appointed Inspector of the Security Police and SD (Inspekteur der Sicherheitspolizei und des SD, or IdS) in Düsseldorf on 15 February 1941, holding this position until 24 June 1942. In addition, from September 1941 to April 1942, he served as the Commander of the SiPo and SD (Befehlshaber der Sicherheitspolizei und des SD, or BdS), for Belgium and northern France, based in Paris.

== Einsatzgruppe commander and Holocaust actions in Russia and Poland ==
After training in anti-partisan warfare, on 30 June 1942 Bierkamp replaced SS-Standartenführer Otto Ohlendorf as commander of Einsatzgruppe D, an SS paramilitary death squad which was responsible for mass killings in the Soviet Union, chiefly in the area between southern Ukraine and the northern Caucasus. On 21 and 22 August 1942, approximately 500 to 600 Jews from Krasnodar were shot. In addition to shootings, the Nazis also employed gas vans to kill their victims, including 30 to 60 individuals in Krasnodar. On 1 September 1942 the Jews of Mineralnyye Vody were taken to the site of a glass factory outside the town, where they were shot in anti-tank trenches. Estimates of the number of victims vary between 200 and 500. In September 1942 the trenches also became the mass grave for Jews from Kislovodsk, Pyatigorsk, and other nearby locations. The total number murdered in the area of the glass factory is estimated as between 6,500 and 7,500. In spring 1943, Einsatzgruppe D was renamed Kampfgruppe Bierkamp (Battle Group Bierkamp) and Bierkamp remained in command of this unit until 15 June 1943.

At that time, Bierkamp was posted as the Commander of SiPo and SD forces (BdS) in the General Government with headquarters in Kraków, retaining this position until February 1945. In this capacity, as well as overseeing additional murders of the Jews in Kraków, he organized the evacuation of the area before the advancing Soviet forces. In a memorandum dated 20 July 1944, he ordered that all prisoners in the labor camps and all those working in the armaments industry were to be evacuated before the Red Army arrived. This involved perhaps up to 70,000 forced laborers. If, he wrote, unforeseen circumstances made it impossible to transport the inmates, they were to be killed on the spot and the bodies disposed of by burning them, by blowing up the buildings, or by other means. The camps were liquidated over the next two months with most inmates being sent to Auschwitz. At the time of the Warsaw Uprising, Bierkamp issued orders for the preventative arrest of thousands of men in the Kraków and Radom districts who were to be shot if the unrest spread.

== Last assignments and death ==
Bierkamp's next assignment was as the BdS "Südwest," based in Stuttgart and encompassing Baden and Württemberg. However, on 10 February 1945, the Higher SS and Police Leader (HSSPF) "Südost" in Silesia, SS-Obergruppenführer Ernst-Heinrich Schmauser, went missing and was presumed captured. SS-Obergruppenführer Richard Hildebrandt was named as his replacement on 20 February, but Bierkamp was made Acting HSSPF in Breslau (today, Wrocław) until 17 March 1945 when Hildebrandt arrived to take command. Bierkamp then returned to his BdS post in Stuttgart until mid-April 1945 when the city was liberated. From then until Germany's surrender, he was stationed in Hamburg. He committed suicide in Scharbeutz on 15 May 1945. He was buried in the Waldfriedhof cemetery at Timmendorfer Strand in Schleswig-Holstein.

== SS and police ranks ==
SS ranks
Rank	Date
1 April 1939	SS-Hauptsturmführer
20 April 1939	SS-Sturmbannführer
15 December 1940	SS-Obersturmbannführer
20 April 1941	SS-Standartenführer
1 May 1942	SS-Oberführer
15 May 1942	Oberst der polizei
9 November 1944	SS-Brigadeführer and Generalmajor of Police

== Sources ==
- Bartrop, Paul R.; Grimm, Eve E. (2019). Perpetrating the Holocaust: Leaders, Enablers, and Collaborators. ABC-CLIO. ISBN 978-1-440-85897-0.
- Klee, Ernst (2007). Das Personenlexikon zum Dritten Reich. Wer war was vor und nach 1945. Frankfurt-am-Main: Fischer-Taschenbuch-Verlag. ISBN 978-3-596-16048-8.
- Miller, Michael D.; Schulz, Andreas (2015). Leaders of the SS & German Police. Vol. 2 Reichsführer SS – Gruppenführer (Hans Haltermann to Walter Kruger). R. James Bender Publishing. ISBN 978-1-932-97025-8.
- Schiffer Publishing Ltd., ed. (2000). SS Officers List: SS-Standartenführer to SS-Oberstgruppenführer (As of 30 January 1942). Schiffer Military History Publishing. ISBN 0-7643-1061-5.
- Winstone, Martin (2014). The Dark Heart of Hitler's Europe: Nazi Rule in Poland Under the General Government. Bloomsbury Publishing. ISBN 978-0-857-72519-6.
- Yerger, Mark C. (1997). Allgemeine-SS: The Commands, Units and Leaders of the General SS. Schiffer Publishing Ltd. ISBN 0-7643-0145-4.
