= Max Thomas (SS general) =

German SS general (1891–1945)

Personal details
- Born: 4 August 1891 Düsseldorf, Rhine Province, Kingdom of Prussia, German Empire
- Died: 6 December 1945 (aged 54) Würzburg, American occupation zone in Germany
- Party: Nazi Party
- Profession: Physician

Military service
- Allegiance: German Empire; Nazi Germany
- Branch/service: Imperial German Army; Schutzstaffel
- Years of service: 1914–1919; 1933–1945
- Rank: Leutnant; SS-Gruppenführer; Generalleutnant of Police
- Unit: Field artillery regiments 7,270 & 154
- Commands: Commander of SiPo and SD in Belgium and northern France; Commander of SiPo and SD in Ukraine; Führer of Einsatzgruppe C; Higher SS and Police Leader of "Black Sea"
- Battles/wars: World War I World War II
- Awards: Clasp to the Iron Cross, 1st and 2nd class War Merit Cross, 1st and 2nd class with swords Wound Badge

Max Gereon Alexander Thomas (4 August 1891 – 6 December 1945) was a German physician, SS-Gruppenführer and Generalleutnant of police in Nazi Germany. During the Second World War, he served as the commander of the Sicherheitspolizei (security police) and the Sicherheitsdienst (SD) in Belgium and northern France and in the Reichskommissariat Ukraine, where he also commanded Einsatzgruppe C. Implicated in Holocaust-related mass murders, he killed himself after the end of the war.

== Early life and education ==
Thomas was born in Düsseldorf and interrupted his higher education on the outbreak of the First World War when he volunteered for military service in the Imperial German Army. He served in the Field Artillery Regiments 7 and 270. Commissioned as a Leutnant of reserves in 1918, he became a battery commander in Field Artillery Regiment 154. He was discharged in 1919, having been awarded the Iron Cross, 1st and 2nd class, and the Wound Badge. He resumed his studies and, in 1922, he received a doctorate in medicine. He then practiced as a specialist in psychiatry.

== SS career ==
Shortly after the Nazi seizure of power, Thomas became a member of the Nazi Party (membership number 1,848,453) on 1 May 1933. On 1 July 1933, he joined the Schutzstaffel (SS) with membership number 141,341. Thomas served as a city councilor in Fritzlar in 1933 and, in January 1935, he entered the Hauptamt (main office) of the Sicherheitsdienst (SD), the intelligence service of the SS, headed by Reinhard Heydrich. On 28 June 1937, he was transferred to the Personal Staff Reichsführer-SS. He remained on Heinrich Himmler's staff until February 1939 when he was given the command of SD-Oberabschnitt (main district) "Rhine", headquartered in Frankfurt. With the rank of SS-Standartenführer, Thomas was appointed Inspekteur der Sicherheitspolizei und des SD (IdS) in Wiesbaden in August 1939, commanding 70 officers from the Gestapo and Kriminalpolizei. Following the defeat of France and the Low Countries in the western campaign, Thomas served as the Befehlshaber der Sicherheitspolizei und des SD, or BdS, (Commander of the Security Police and SD) in Belgium and northern France from June 1940 to October 1941.

=== Einsatzgruppen command ===
In October 1941, now an SS-Brigadeführer and Generalmajor of police, Thomas succeeded Otto Rasch as Führer of Einsatzgruppen C, which was deployed at northern and central Ukraine in the Soviet Union. From October to the end of the year, the Einsatzgruppe engaged in the mass murder of thousands of Ukrainian Jews, including the massacres at Drobytsky Yar. In March 1942, Thomas was also appointed the BdS for the Reichskommissariat Ukraine in Kiev. He was responsible for executing the dissolution of the Jewish ghettos in Ukraine that resulted in the deaths of an estimated 300,000 people.

Thomas attained his last promotion to SS-Gruppenführer and Generalleutnant of police on 9 November 1942. In response to the Red Army advance into Ukraine, SS-Standartenführer Paul Blobel arrived in Kiev in July 1943 with orders to destroy the evidence of Nazi atrocities in an operation codenamed Sonderaktion 1005. The SS and police under Thomas' command were assigned to oversee the exhumation and incineration of the corpses at the site of the Babi Yar massacre by concentration camp prisoners. Shortly afterward, Thomas was seriously wounded by a land mine, was removed from his command and was appointed the Higher SS and Police Leader "Black Sea" in August 1943. However, an injury in a plane crash in December 1943 led to the termination of this assignment as well, and he was placed in the SS-Führerreserve in April 1944. He was assigned to the SS Personnel Main Office from November 1944. During the war, he was awarded the Clasp to the Iron Cross, 1st and 2nd class, the War Merit Cross, 1st and 2nd class with swords, and the Wound Badge.

== SS and police ranks ==
SS and police ranks
| Date | Rank |
|---|---|
| 13 September 1936 | SS-Untersturmführer |
| 20 April 1937 | SS-Obersturmführer |
| 9 November 1937 | SS-Hauptsturmführer |
| 20 April 1938 | SS-Sturmbannführer |
| 30 January 1939 | SS-Obersturmbannführer |
| 1 August 1939 | SS-Standartenführer |
| 1 August 1940 | SS-Oberführer |
| 1 January 1941 | SS-Brigadeführer und Generalmajor der Polizei |
| 9 November 1942 | SS-Gruppenführer und Generalleutnant der Polizei |

== Post-war ==
After Germany's surrender on 8 May 1945, Thomas went into hiding under the alias Dr. Karl Brandenburg, and worked in the practice of a Dr. Mackenstein at Kleinostheim in Lower Franconia. On 6 December 1945, he took his own life, dying at the Luitpold Hospital in Würzburg.

== Sources ==
- Gutman, Israel, ed. (1995). Encyclopedia of the Holocaust. Vol. 1. Macmillan Publishing Company. ISBN 978-0-028-64528-5.
- Klee, Ernst (2007). Das Personenlexikon zum Dritten Reich. Wer war was vor und nach 1945. Frankfurt-am-Main: Fischer-Taschenbuch-Verlag. ISBN 978-3-596-16048-8.
- Schiffer Publishing Ltd., ed. (2000). SS Officers List: SS-Standartenführer to SS-Oberstgruppenführer (As of 30 January 1942). Schiffer Military History Publishing. ISBN 0-7643-1061-5.
- Thomas, Dr. med. Max in Traces of War
