= Karl Brunner (SS general) =

German jurist and member of the SS (1900–1980)

- Born: 26 July 1900; Passau, German Empire
- Died: 7 December 1980 (aged 80); Munich, West Germany
- Military career
- Allegiance: German Empire; Nazi Germany
- Branch: Bavarian Army; Schutzstaffel
- Service years: 1917–19 (Bavaria); 1934–1945 (SS)
- Rank: SS-Brigadeführer
- Service number: NSDAP #1,903,386; SS #107,161
- Unit: Einsatzgruppe I
- Commands: Einsatzkommando 4/I

Karl Brunner (26 July 1900 – 7 December 1980) was a German lawyer, SS-Brigadeführer and Generalmajor of the police and the SS and police leader in Salzburg and Bolzano. Brunner served as head of the Einsatzkommando 4/I during the invasion of Poland and the early stages of the German occupation in 1939, tasked with the killing of Polish civilians. During his time in Northern Italy he was also responsible for the arrest, and ultimately, the deportation of the Jews in his area of jurisdiction, as well as reprisals against Italian civilians.

After the war Brunner was held at Island Farm Prisoner of War Camp. He later entered the Bavarian government service and died in 1980 without facing prosecution for his criminal conduct during the war.

== Biography ==
Brunner was born in Passau on 26 July 1900 in what was then the Kingdom of Bavaria within the German Empire. During World War I, from September 1917 onward, he served in the Bavarian 16th Infantry Regiment "Großherzog Ferdinand von Toskana", from which he was discharged in 1919.

Leaving the Bavarian Army with the rank of lieutenant, Brunner joined the Freikorps, a right-wing paramilitary militia, in 1919 and was part of the Marine-Brigade Ehrhardt in 1922–23. He also was a member of the Deutschvölkischer Schutz- und Trutzbund , the largest and most active antisemitic organization in the Weimar Republic. After studying law at the Ludwig-Maximilians-Universität München, he worked as a lawyer from 1927 onward.

In March 1933, Brunner joined the Sturmabteilung (SA), and the Nazi Party with membership number 1,903,386. In June 1934, he joined the Schutzstaffel (SS) with membership number 107,161. From January to September 1935, he worked in the SiPo, security police. From April 1937 to June 1940, he was head of the Gestapo in Munich. In this role he was responsible for securing employment in an aircraft factory for Max Troll, a communist-turned-informer who betrayed over 250 resistance members to the Gestapo between 1933 and 1936.

With the invasion of Poland, Brunner served as head of the Einsatzkommando 4/I until November 1939, tasked with the killing of Polish civilians as part of Operation Tannenberg. From early 1940 to April 1944, he was Inspector of the security police and SD in Salzburg. Simultaneously, since March 1941, he headed Amt Ia at the Reich Security Main Office. From 15 September 1943, he was also SS and police leader for the Alpine Foothills, based in Bolzano, a position he held until the end of the war.

During his time in Italy, Brunner, a fanatical Nazi, was responsible for the deportation of Italian Jews to extermination camps and reprisals against Italian civilians and partisans. Shortly after his arrival in Northern Italy, on 12 September 1943, he ordered the arrest of all Jews in his jurisdiction.

Brunner has been blamed for some the final atrocities committed by Germany in Italy, after the German surrender. After the surrender, celebrations of the Italian-speaking population broke out that saw 11 people killed in Merano on 30 April and 41 people killed at Bolzano on 3 May 1945, when Wehrmacht and SS units fired on civilians. This and the encounters between German troops and Italian partisans has been referred to as the Battle of Bolzano (Italian: Battaglia di Bolzano).

Brunner was arrested in Bolzano on 13 May 1945. He spent the next three years in British Prisoner of War Camps, the final year of it at Island Farm, and was released in May 1948. During his time in the SS, he rose to the rank Generalmajor of the police, promoted on 21 October 1942, and SS-Brigadeführer (brigadier general), promoted on 9 November 1942. He was also awarded the Iron Cross first class in January 1945.

In post-war Germany, Brunner worked for the Gehlen Organization, a predecessor of the Bundesnachrichtendienst, the domestic West German intelligence service. In 1956, he re-entered Bavarian government service, rising to the rank of a Regierungsrat in the district of Pfaffenhofen. Brunner never faced any charges for his criminal conduct in the SS during the war.
