= Rudolf Mildner =

German Nazi SS officer

- Born: 10 July 1902; Janov, Austrian Silesia; Austria-Hungary
- Died: 31 December 1951 (Legally declared dead)
- Military career
- Allegiance: Austria-Hungary; Nazi Germany
- Branch: Austro-Hungarian Army; Schutzstaffel
- Service years: 1917–1918; 1935–1945
- Rank: SS-Standartenführer
- Unit: Gestapo
- Commands: Befehlshaber der Sicherheitspolizei und des SD, Denmark; Kommandeur der Sicherheitspolizei und des SD, Vienna
- Conflicts: World War I World War II
- Awards: War Merit Cross, 2nd class

Rudolf Mildner (10 July 1902, Janov – unknown) was an Austrian-German SS-Standartenführer. He served as the chief of the Gestapo at Katowice and was the head of the political department at Auschwitz concentration camp, conducting "third degree" methods of interrogation from March 1941 until September 1943. As such, he frequently sent prisoners to Auschwitz for incarceration or execution. He visited Auschwitz on several occasions. He was the commander of the SiPo and SD in occupied Denmark but failed to prevent the escape of Danish Jews and was relieved of his command. In December 1944, he was appointed local commander of the SiPo and SD in Vienna. After the war, Mildner testified at the Nuremberg Trials and remained in custody until 1949. He was released and disappeared to escape prosecution. Unconfirmed reports indicated that he escaped to South America, and he was legally declared dead.

== Early life ==
Born in Johannestal, Austrian Silesia, Mildner served as a volunteer in the Austro-Hungarian Army during World War I. After the war, he served in the Freikorps Sudetenland. Mildner trained to become a police officer in Salzburg. In 1925, he entered the Austrian police service. During that time he furthered his education by attending night school.

== Nazi career ==
He became a member of the Nazi Party (NSDAP) in 1931 with number 614,080. He achieved a doctorate of law at the University of Innsbruck in 1934. In 1935, he was forced to leave Austria and move to Germany. There he became a German citizen and entered the SS (number 275,741). Milder obtained a position in the political police department in Munich.

After the 1938 Anschluss, Mildner became chief of the Gestapo in Linz and, in 1939, in Salzburg, Austria. From December 1939 to early 1941, he led the Gestapo at Chemnitz. In March 1941 he was named as the head of the Gestapo in Kattowitz (today, Katowice). It was through this office that Mildner became connected with the Auschwitz concentration camp and served as head of a "kangaroo court", which sentenced some 2,000 Poles to death. At the Nuremberg trial of the major Nazi war criminals on 2 January 1946, a letter dated 3 December 1941 from the Prosecutor General in Kattowitz to the Reich Minister of Justice on police executions without criminal proceedings was submitted as part of the indictment:

"About 3 weeks ago, in Tarnowitz, in connection with the destruction of a highly treacherous organization of 350 members, the 6 (partly Ethnic Germans)main perpetrators were hanged by the police without the judiciary being aware of it. Such executions have already taken place in the past on criminal perpetrators in the district of Bielitz without the knowledge of the responsible law enforcement authority. On December 2, 1941, the head of the Katowice State Police Department, Oberregierungsrat Mildner told the undersigned orally that he had ordered these executions with the authorization of the Reichsführer of the SS as a necessary immediate measure by public hanging at the scene of the crime, and that the deterrence measures had to be continued in the future until the criminal and activist anti-German forces in the incorporated eastern area had been smashed or other immediate measures, possibly also of the courts, ensured the same deterrent effect. Thus, even today, in the area in and around Sosnowitz, 6 main ringleaders of another Polish highly treabar organization were publicly hanged as a deterrent."

Mildner's ad hoc court hearing was described by Auschwitz SS-Unterscharführer and war criminal, Perry Broad:

A 16-year-old boy was brought into the room. An unbearable famine led to him stealing some food from a store, so he was tried in a "criminal" case, like a criminal. After reading the death sentence, Mildner slowly put the document on his desk and directed a penetrating look at the pale and poorly dressed boy. "Do you have a mother?" he asked. The boy lowered his eyes and in a quiet voice replied, "Yes." "Are you afraid to die?" asked the merciless, fat butcher, who seemed to enjoy the suffering of his victim. The boy was silent, but he was shaking on his body. "Today you will be shot," Mildner said, trying to set an unrelenting tone to his voice, "Someday they would hang you anyway. In an hour you will be dead".

According to Broad, Mildner particularly psychologically abused women, telling them in drastic detail how they would be shot.

In 1942, he received the War Merit Cross, 2nd class for fighting the enemies of the Reich.

In September 1943, Mildner was transferred to occupied Denmark as the Befehlshaber der Sicherheitspolizei und des SD (BdS). He was charged with fighting the Danish resistance movement and organizing the deportation of Danish Jews, but the deportation failed and 95 percent of them succeeded in sailing safely to neutral Sweden. Mildner tried to regain status by participating in the killing of Danish playwright, priest and Nazi opponent Kaj Munk. However, the deportation failure was held against him and he was transferred out of Denmark in January 1944. He then briefly served as Inspekteur der Sicherheitspolizei und des SD (IdS) in Wehrkreis IX with headquarters in Kassel.

From March 1944 to June 1944, Mildner was the deputy chief of sub-offices IVA and IVB (Enemies of the Regime & Activities of the Sects and Churches) in the Reich Security Main Office (RSHA). In December 1944, he was appointed as Kommandeur der Sicherheitspolizei und des SD (KdS) in Vienna. He ran the Vienna office under SS-Brigadeführer Franz Josef Huber who had been promoted to BdS. In this capacity, Mildner was responsible for the court-martial and subsequent execution of resistance fighters Major Karl Biedermann, Captain Alfred Huth and First Lieutenant Rudolf Raschke, who had tried to save Vienna from destruction by handing the city over to the Allies. After Vienna was captured by the Red Army, Mildner returned to Linz as the deputy to Huber. In May 1945, he escaped to the west and was arrested by U.S. Army soldiers and testified at the Nuremberg Trials. The American army detained Mildner and "saved him from landing in the hands of war crimes investigators, because his knowledge of communist subversion was considered useful".

== Nuremberg trials ==
At Nuremberg, Mildner testified with regards to RSHA chief Ernst Kaltenbrunner. He declared that while he was Gestapo leader at Kattowitz he frequently sent prisoners to Auschwitz for imprisonment or execution. He visited Auschwitz on several occasions and was shown the extermination installations. Mildner stated that he had tried to prevent the Jewish persecution in Denmark, but was overruled by Himmler. He was released in 1949 and disappeared to escape prosecution. According to a declassified CIA Report, Mildner was allowed to escape to South America. Adolf Eichmann claimed to have met Mildner in Argentina in 1958, but this claim has not been verified. (It is alleged that in Argentina at the end of the 1950s, he was present at interviews by Willem Sassen with Adolf Eichmann). In 1960, the Vienna Public Prosecutor's Office wanted to investigate him, but did not achieve results. On 27 June 1969, the Salzburg Regional Court declared him legally dead as of 31 December 1951. The actual date and place of his death is unknown.

== See also ==
- List of people who disappeared
- Rescue of the Danish Jews

== Bibliography ==
- Goldensohn, Leon N., and Gellately, Robert (ed.): The Nuremberg Interviews, Alfred A. Knopf, New York, 2004 ISBN 0-375-41469-X
- Klee, Ernst (2007). Das Personenlexikon zum Dritten Reich. Wer war was vor und nach 1945. Frankfurt-am-Main: Fischer-Taschenbuch-Verlag. ISBN 978-3-596-16048-8.
