= Vysoká (Bruntál District) =

- Municipality
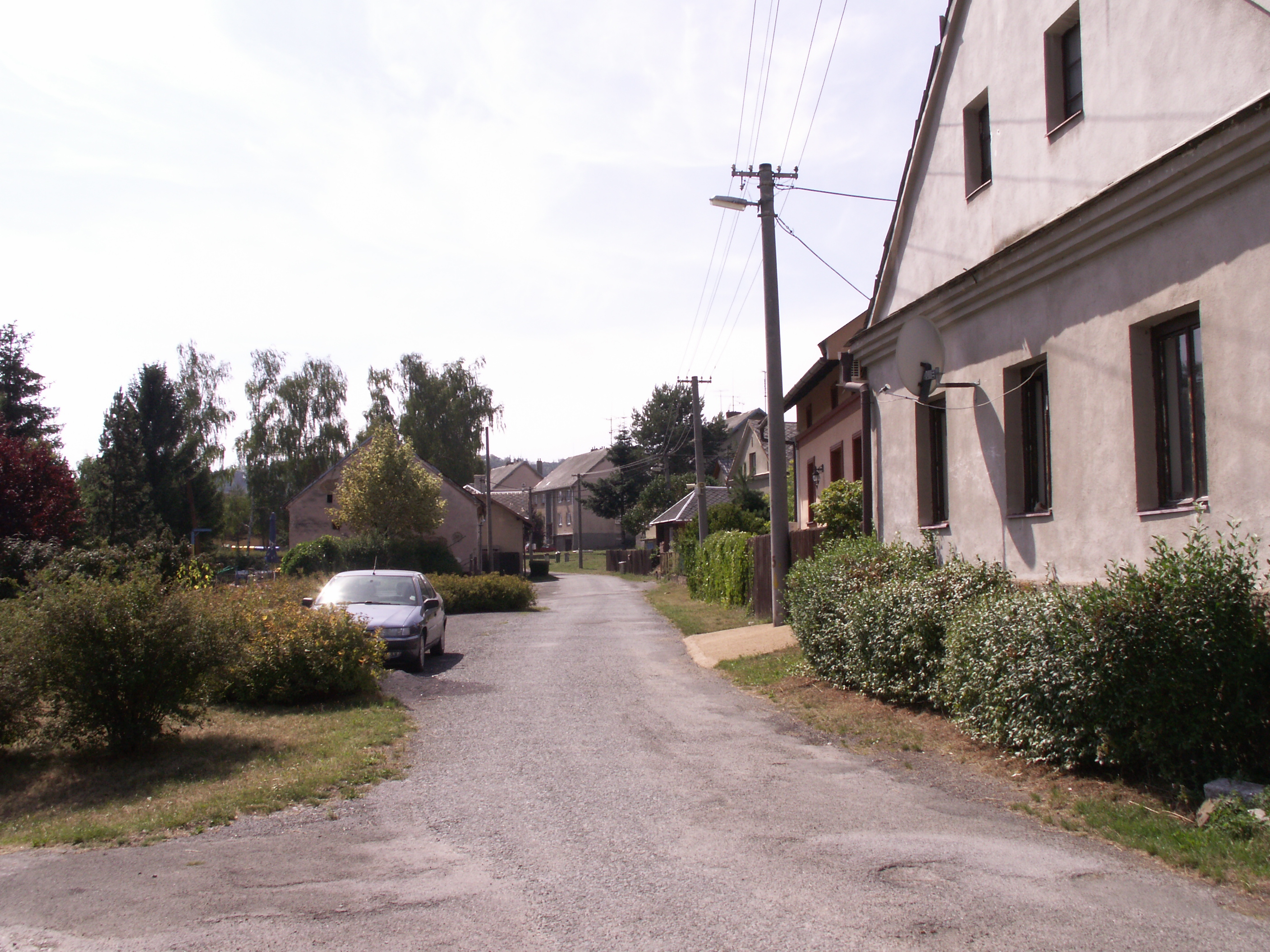
- Centre of Vysoká

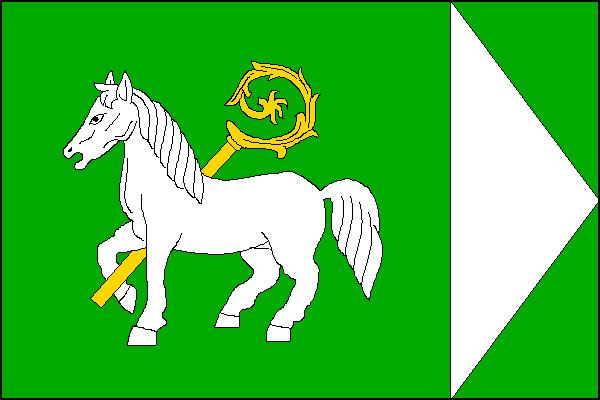
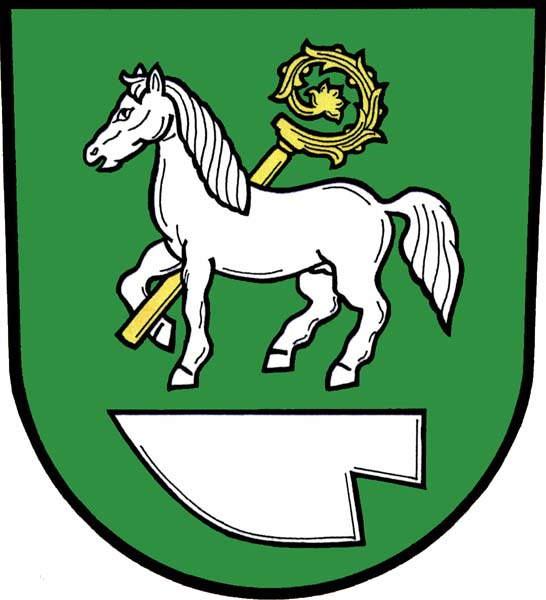
- Flag Coat of arms

- Location in the Czech Republic
- Coordinates: 50°15′41″N 17°35′25″E
- Country: Czech Republic
- Region: Moravian-Silesian
- District: Bruntál
- First mentioned: 1267

Area
  - Total: 17.12 km^{2} (6.61 sq mi)
- Elevation: 280 m (920 ft)

Population (2026-01-01)
  - Total: 322
  - Density: 18.8/km^{2} (48.7/sq mi)
- Time zone: UTC+1 (CET)
  - Summer (DST): UTC+2 (CEST)
- Postal code: 793 99
- Website: www.obec-vysoka.cz

Vysoká (German: Waißak) is a municipality and village in Bruntál District in the Moravian-Silesian Region of the Czech Republic. It has about 300 inhabitants.

== Administrative division ==
Vysoká consists of three municipal parts (in brackets population according to the 2021 census):

- Vysoká (133)
- Bartultovice (55)
- Pitárné (79)

== Geography ==
Vysoká is located about 31 kilometres (19 mi) north of Bruntál and 66 km (41 mi) northwest of Ostrava. It situated in the Osoblažsko microregion, on the border with Poland. It lies in the Zlatohorská Highlands. The highest point is near the top of the hill Strážnice at 493 m (1,617 ft) above sea level. The Osoblaha River flows across the municipality. The village of Pitárne is located at the confluence of the Osoblaha with the Mušlov Stream.

== History ==
The first written mention of Vysoká is from 1267.

== Demographics ==
Historical population

Year	Pop.	±%
1869	1,973	—
1880	2,016	+2.2%
1890	1,793	−11.1%
1900	1,699	−5.2%
1910	1,573	−7.4%

Year	Pop.	±%
1921	1,379	−12.3%
1930	1,253	−9.1%
1950	569	−54.6%
1961	552	−3.0%
1970	442	−19.9%

Year	Pop.	±%
1980	394	−10.9%
1991	305	−22.6%
2001	302	−1.0%
2011	301	−0.3%
2021	267	−11.3%

Source: Censuses

== Transport ==
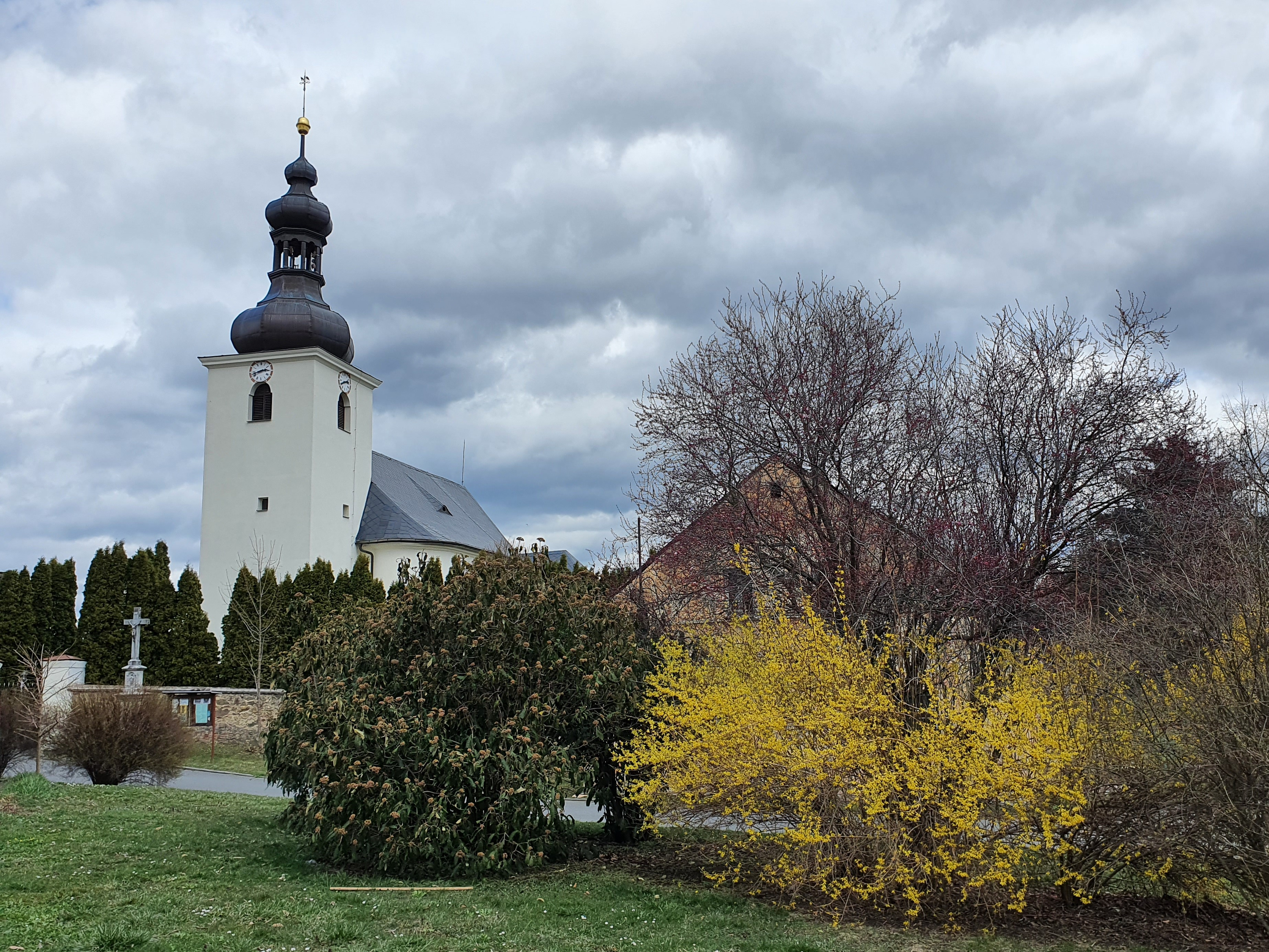
Church of Saint Urban

On the Czech–Polish border is the road border crossing Bartultovice / Trzebina. The I/57 road connects the border with Opava.

== Sights ==
The main landmark of Vysoká is the Church of Saint Urban. It was built in the Baroque style in 1766–1767.

The Church of the Visitation of the Virgin Mary is located in Pitárné. This Baroque church was built in 1773.
