= Jindřichov (Bruntál District) =

- Municipality
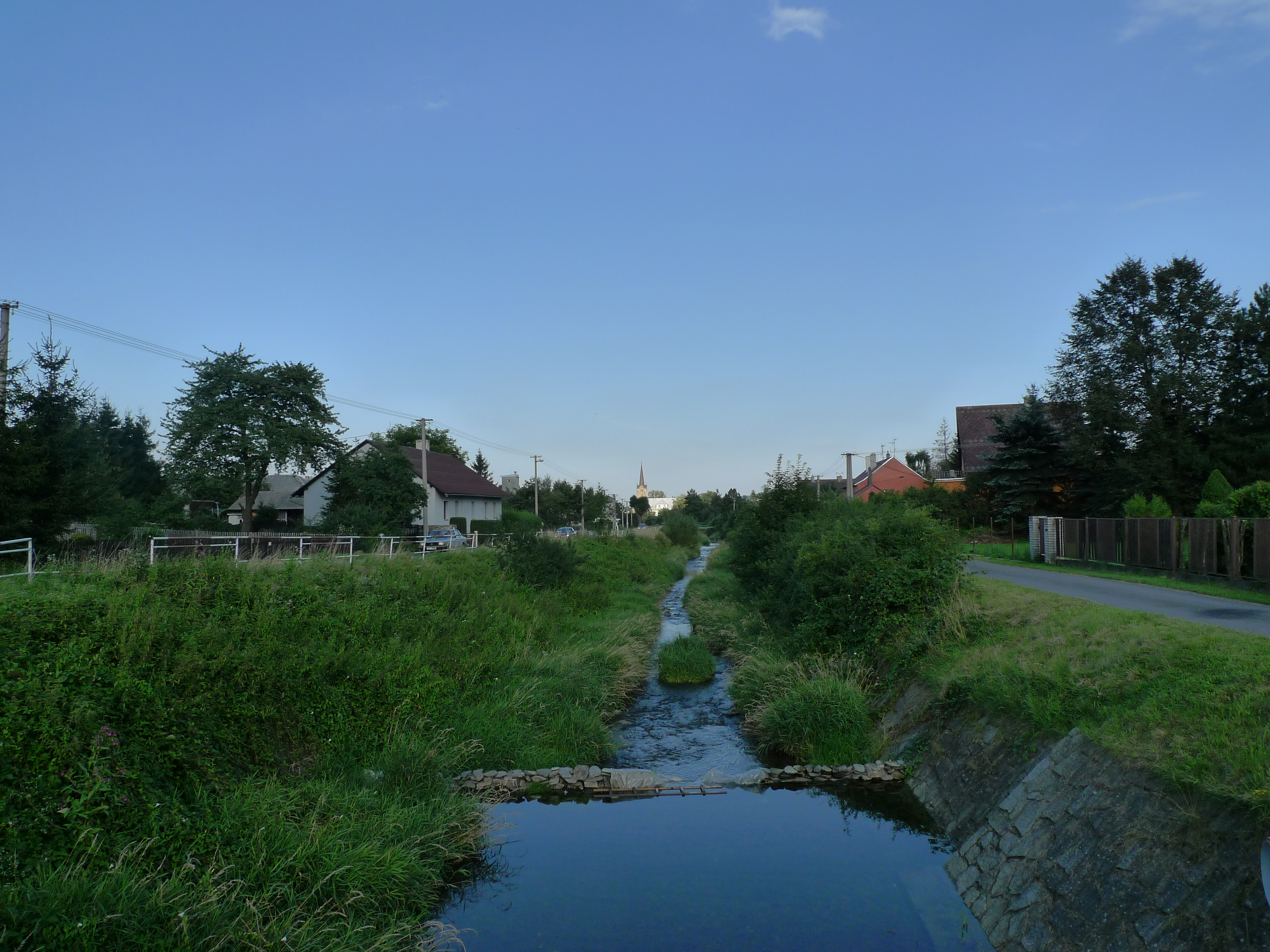
- The Osoblaha River in Jindřichov

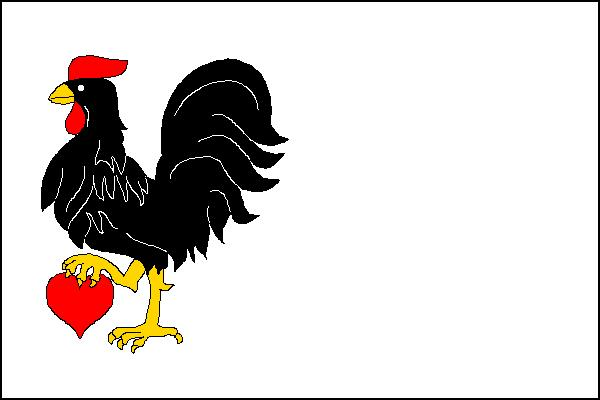
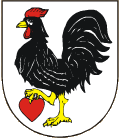
- Flag Coat of arms

- Location in the Czech Republic
- Coordinates: 50°15′7″N 17°31′9″E
- Country: Czech Republic
- Region: Moravian-Silesian
- District: Bruntál
- First mentioned: 1256

Area
  - Total: 34.71 km^{2} (13.40 sq mi)
- Elevation: 327 m (1,073 ft)

Population (2026-01-01)
  - Total: 1,126
  - Density: 32.44/km^{2} (84.02/sq mi)
- Time zone: UTC+1 (CET)
  - Summer (DST): UTC+2 (CEST)
- Postal code: 793 83
- Website: www.obecjindrichov.cz

Jindřichov (German: Hennersdorf) is a municipality and village in Bruntál District in the Moravian-Silesian Region of the Czech Republic. It has about 1,100 inhabitants.

== Administrative division ==
Jindřichov consists of two municipal parts (in brackets population according to the 2021 census):

- Jindřichov (1,063)
- Arnultovice (52)

== Geography ==
Jindřichov is located about 29 kilometres (18 mi) north of Bruntál and 70 km (43 mi) northwest of Ostrava. It is situated in the Osoblažsko microregion, on the border with Poland. The municipality lies in the valley of the Osoblaha River, in the Zlatohorská Highlands. The highest point is under the top of the Na Valštejně hill, at 740 m (2,428 ft) above sea level.

== History ==
The first written mention of Jindřichov is from 1256. The village was founded shortly before by the Olomouc bishop Bruno von Schauenburg, during the German colonisation of the region.

The most notable owners of Jindřichov were the Counts of Hodice, who had built here the castle and the church. The village was in their possession from the mid-17th century until 1739.

== Demographics ==
Historical population

Year	Pop.	±%
1869	3,168	—
1880	3,310	+4.5%
1890	3,105	−6.2%
1900	3,003	−3.3%
1910	2,863	−4.7%

Year	Pop.	±%
1921	2,538	−11.4%
1930	2,715	+7.0%
1950	1,576	−42.0%
1961	1,893	+20.1%
1970	1,860	−1.7%

Year	Pop.	±%
1980	1,635	−12.1%
1991	1,578	−3.5%
2001	1,565	−0.8%
2011	1,287	−17.8%
2021	1,115	−13.4%

Source: Censuses

== Transport ==
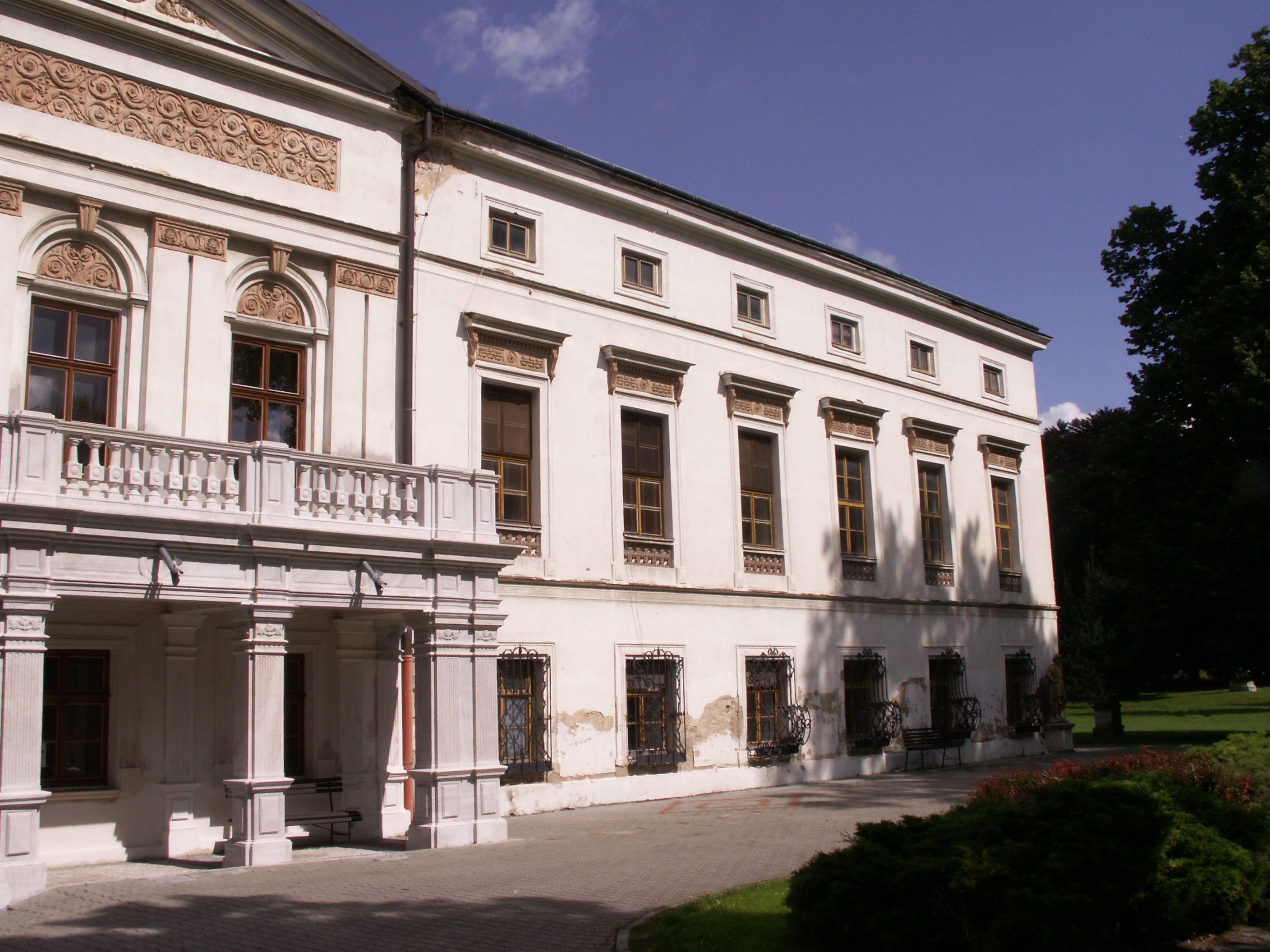
Jidnřichov Castle

Jindřichov is located on the Krnov–Jeseník railway line.

== Sights ==
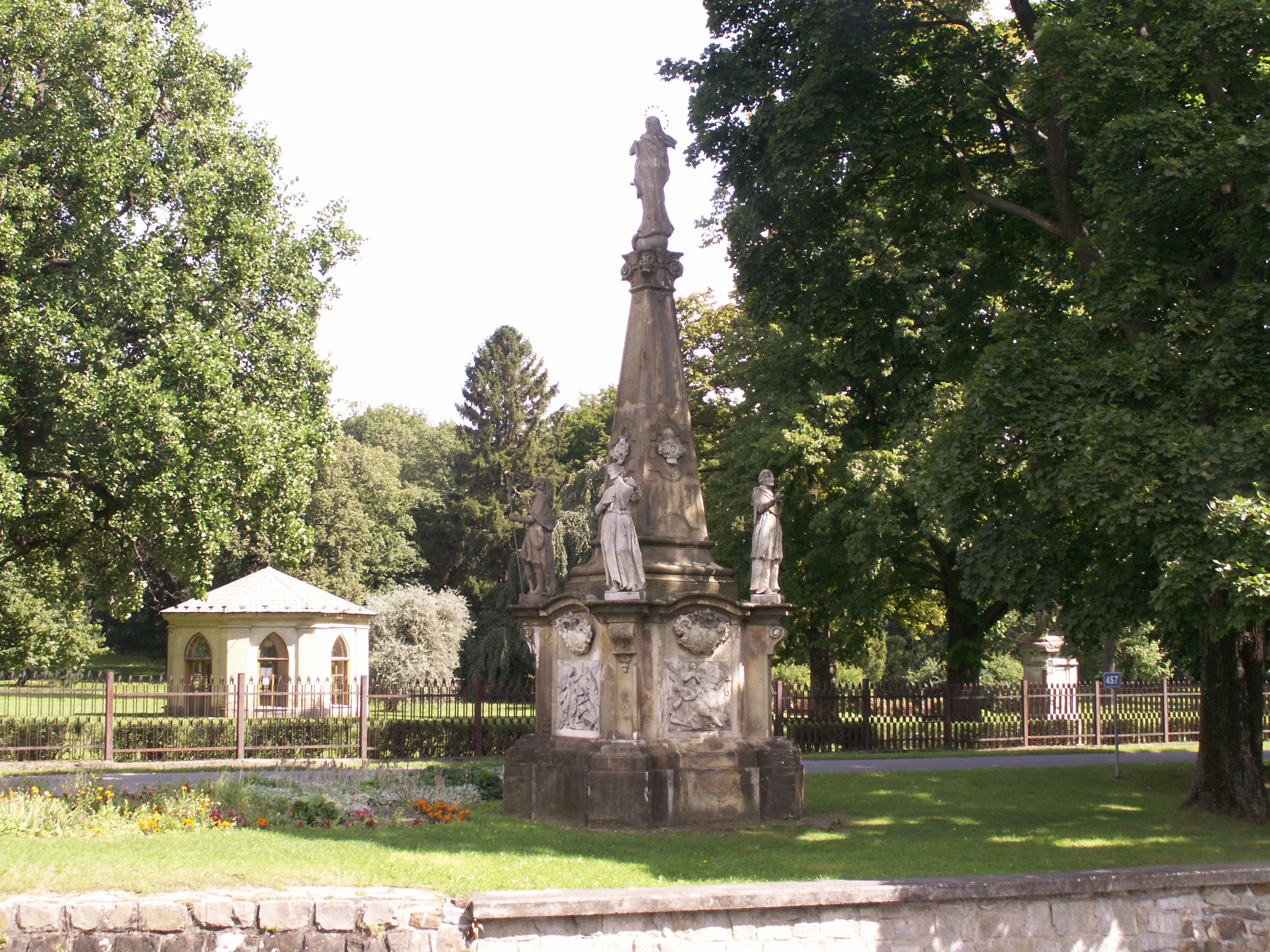
Sculptural group of the Virgin Mary

The main landmark of Jindřichov is the Jindřichov Castle with a large park. The castle was built in the Baroque style in the second half of the 17th century, as a seat for the Counts of Hodice. The castle was rebuilt in the Empire style in 1844, after it was damaged by a fire. Since 2010, the castle has been owned by Jindřichov. Today it serves as housing for the socially disadvantaged and as a multi-purpose cultural facility.

The castle is surrounded by a 4.73 hectares (11.7 acres) large park. It was founded by the Counts of Hodice in the French style in the first half of the 17th century, was adapted to the English-style park in the first half of the 19th century. There is a great variety of rare trees. The park is decorated with several sculptures, the oldest of which are two marble lions in front of the castle entrance from the 18th century. There is also a fountain and statues of St. Hubert, St. Christopher and Friedrich Schiller.

The second notable landmark is the Church of Saint Nicholas, built in 1671–1673. Valuable is also a sculptural group of the Virgin Mary near the castle entrance, which dates from 1757.

== Twin towns – sister cities ==
Jindřichov is twinned with:

- Hennersdorf, Austria
