= Prudnik (river) =

Coordinates: 50°17′54″N 17°44′51″E

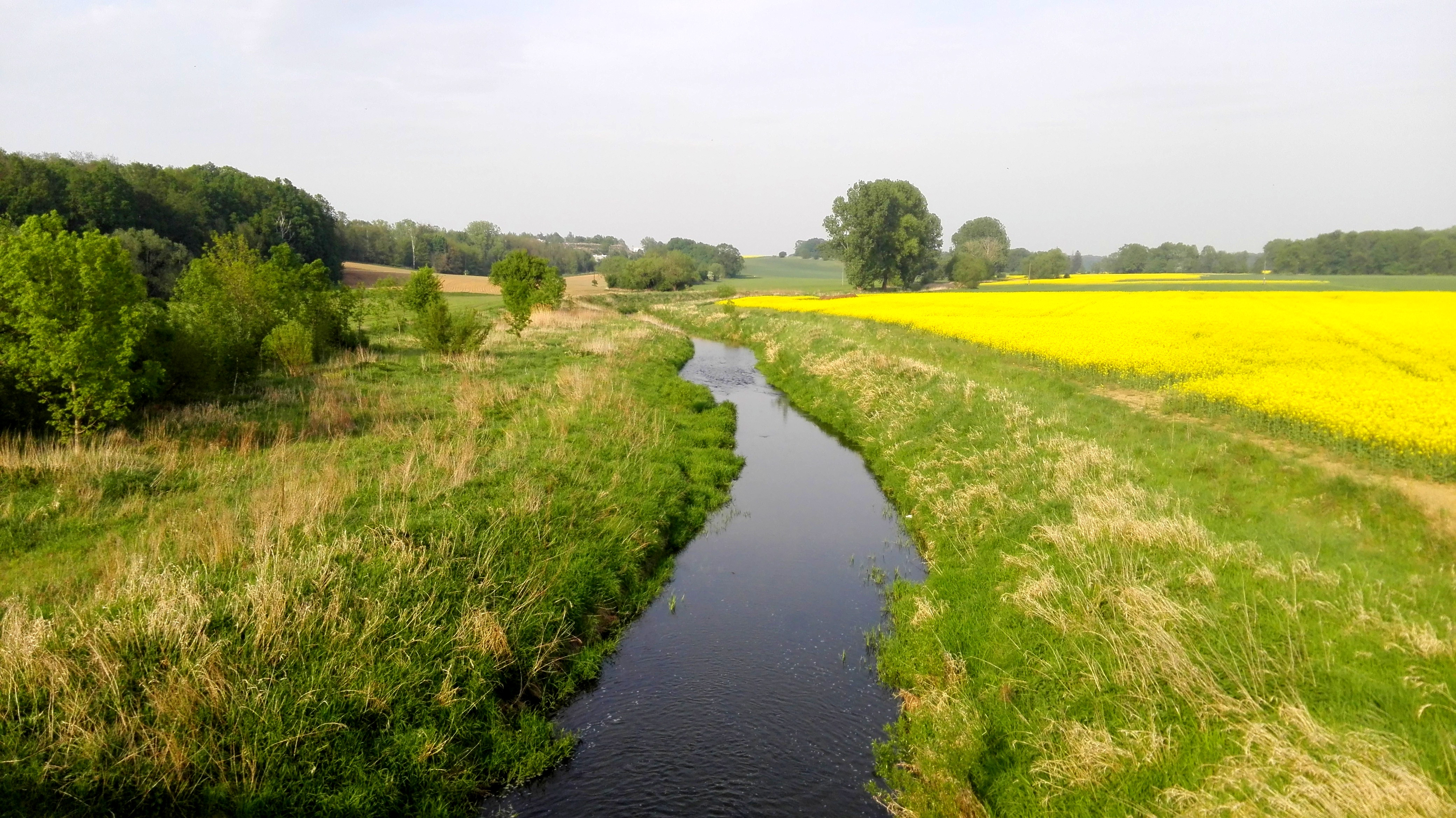

Location
- Countries: Czech Republic; Poland

Physical characteristics
- Mouth
  - location: Osobłoga
- Length: 36.07 km (22.41 mi)

Prudnik (Czech: Prudník, German: Prudnik, Braune, Brdun, Brudnick) is a river of the Czech Republic and Poland. The river originates under the mountain Czapka. Its longest confluent is Złoty Potok.

The name of the river is a Bohemized form of "Prądnik". The name of it also became a name of the city of Prudnik.
