= Max Troll =

- Born: 1902; Lower Bavaria, German Empire
- Died: 7 April 1972 (aged 69–70); Regensburg, West Germany
- Occupations: Party activist and official
- Known for: Gestapo informer (1933–1936)
- Political party: Communist Party of Germany (KPD) (1932–1936)

Max Troll (1902 – 7 April 1972) was a German communist-turned-informer who betrayed hundreds of Bavarian communists to the Bavarian Political Police, a forerunner of the Gestapo, between 1933 and 1936. Troll spent a short time in Dachau concentration camp and served in the German Army during World War II. After the war he was sentenced to ten years in jail for his role as informer and released after five, in contrast to his Gestapo handlers who were not prosecuted.

Troll was never a Nazi, opposing the regime instead, but a number of factors have been cited for his betrayal, among them financial difficulties, his treatment while being held at Dachau and the threat of physical violence against his stepbrothers should he not cooperate.

== Biography ==
=== Early life ===
Troll, the son of a truck driver, and born in Lower Bavaria, grew up in Munich. Troll worked as a labourer on building sites and as a life guard for the city of Munich, but lost his job in 1931 because of his left-wing activities and thereafter remained unemployed until 1934. Troll lived in the working class suburb of Giesing, in public housing, an area dominated by unemployment and communist activities, and joined the Communist Party of Germany (KPD) in 1932.

=== Nazi era ===
With Adolf Hitler's rise to power in Germany, the Nazis took power in Bavaria on 9 March 1933 and Troll was arrested the same day alongside his two stepbrothers and taken to Dachau concentration camp. He and his brothers were some of its first inmates. Troll was released in May and worked as an informer for the Bavarian political police, now under the control of Heinrich Himmler. The possibility exists that he either already worked as an informer when he joined the KPD in 1932, or that he may have been forced into cooperating after his release by the threat that his brothers would be killed or ill-treated at Dachau should he refuse. His difficult financial situation as well as the fact that he was broken by ill treatment while at Dachau may also have been factors. In any case, from May 1933 Troll made a concentrated effort to establish the names of Bavarian communists who had gone underground. Because of the decentralized nature of the communist movements it had become very hard for the police to track the communist resistance.

Under the code name "Theo", Troll actively recruited members for the communist resistance. He was employed at a building site at the Deutsches Museum in Munich in 1934 and successfully recruited members there. Those as well as communists who distributed illegal leaflets and collected donations for the Rote Hilfe, an organisation supporting family members of people arrested by the Nazis, were betrayed by Troll. He rose to become, in April 1935, the leader of the Rote Hilfe and, in early 1936, the leader of the KPD in Southern Bavaria. Troll travelled repeatedly to Switzerland and Czechoslovakia to obtain donations and instructions while also infiltrating the non-communist resistance in Bavaria with his informers.

Because of his work the Bavarian political police were able to wait until mid-1935 until initiating a wave of arrests, being in almost complete control of the communist resistance in Munich and able to direct it through Troll. By then, when suspicion started to fall on him, Troll had handed the names of 250 communists and sympathisers to the police as well as betrayed their organisational structure, bringing the communist resistance in Munich to an almost complete standstill. Some of the resistance members he betrayed were subsequently sentenced to death and executed. He was also involved in the destruction of the Munich cell of the Socialist Workers' Party of Germany and made contact with Catholic and monarchist resistance groups as part of the aim of the KPD to create a united peoples front, the Volksfront, to resist Hitler and the Nazis.

Troll was withdrawn as an informer by the Gestapo in 1936 and subsequently worked in the Messerschmitt aircraft factory in Regensburg, courtesy to a glowing referral provided by Karl Brunner, the head of the Gestapo in Munich.

While paid well during his times as police informer for his work, receiving up to 240 Reichsmark per month, Troll did not receive any further benefits once his role had been completed and the Gestapo actively tried to ensure that he would not be employed in any politically sensitive role. From 1940 to 1944 Troll served in the Wehrmacht until captured in 1944, and returned to Germany in 1946 after having been a prisoner of war in France. During his time in the German military his comrades noted that Troll was opposed to the Nazi regime and criticised it, something they testified to in his trial after the war.

=== Post-war ===
He was tracked down by victims of his betrayal, who extracted a written confession from him, which led to his arrest in West Germany in May 1947. He was sentenced to ten years in a labour camp by a court in Regensburg, but released after five for health reasons. The sentence against Troll in Regensburg was one of the hardest for Nazi crimes there and also included confiscation of his assets, loss of the right to vote, and a ban from working.

Attempts to prosecute him further for the death of communists he betrayed were unsuccessful as the court in Munich deemed the result of his actions as within the frame of the anti-communist laws in Germany at the time and the Cold War anti-communist attitude in the west after the war. His three former contacts in the Gestapo who he reported to were not prosecuted, although they did spend some compulsory time in detention for being members of the organisation. Some even re-entered Bavarian government service after the war.

Troll died in Regensburg on 7 April 1972 without suffering any further repercussions for his actions as informer.

The destruction of the communist resistance in Munich and the role Troll played in it became part of the novel Verrat in München und Burghausen (Betrayal in Munich and Burghausen) by Max Brym, published in 2018, which tells the story a fictional protagonist in the background of the real events.
