= Janov (Bruntál District) =

- Town
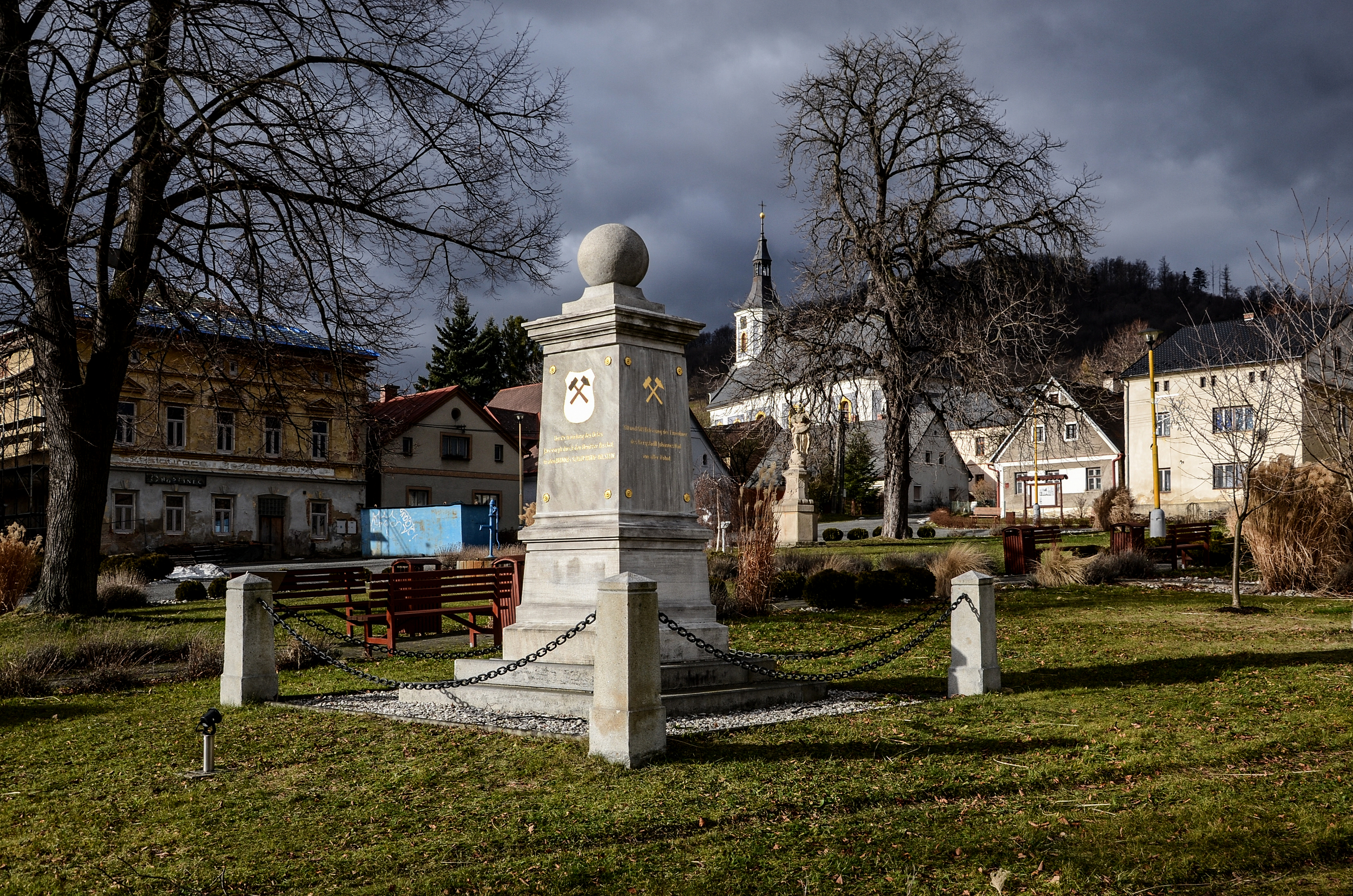
- Centre of Janov

- Flag Coat of arms

- Location in the Czech Republic
- Coordinates: 50°14′41″N 17°28′53″E
- Country: Czech Republic
- Region: Moravian-Silesian
- District: Bruntál
- First mentioned: 1267

Government
  - Mayor: Jan Borovec

Area
  - Total: 11.03 km^{2} (4.26 sq mi)
- Elevation: 410 m (1,350 ft)

Population (2026-01-01)
  - Total: 258
  - Density: 23.4/km^{2} (60.6/sq mi)
- Time zone: UTC+1 (CET)
  - Summer (DST): UTC+2 (CEST)
- Postal code: 793 84
- Website: www.mestojanov.cz

Janov (Czech pronunciation: [ˈjanof]; German: Johannesthal) is a town in Bruntál District in the Moravian-Silesian Region of the Czech Republic. It has about 300 inhabitants, making it one of the least populous towns in the country.

== Geography ==
Janov is located about 28 kilometres (17 mi) north of Bruntál and 72 kilometres (45 mi) northwest of Ostrava. It is situated in the Osoblažsko microregion, on the border with Poland. It lies in the Zlatohorská Highlands. The highest point of the municipal territory is on the slopes of the hill Solný vrch at 860 m (2,822 ft) above sea level. The town is situated in the valley of the Osoblaha River.

== History ==
Janov was probably founded in 1251 by Bishop Bruno von Schauenburg as an agricultural forest village. From its inception until 1588, Janov was part of the Osoblaha estate, owned by the bishops of Olomouc. In 1535, it was promoted to a free mining town by bishop Stanislav I Thurzo. It was assumed that there are rich deposits of precious metals around the town and its mining will bring prosperity and wealth. Although the assumptions were not met and the mining ended in 1581, the already granted privileges helped the development of Janov and gave the town an urban character.

The prosperity ended with the Thirty Years' War, when Janov was occupied by the Swedish army. In 1741, during the War of the Austrian Succession, the town was burned down by Prussians. However, it recovered. In 1938, Janov was annexed by the Nazi Germany. After World War II, the German-speaking population was expelled and the town depopulated.

== Demographics ==
Historical population

Year	Pop.	±%
1869	1,625	—
1880	1,615	−0.6%
1890	1,517	−6.1%
1900	1,394	−8.1%
1910	1,341	−3.8%

Year	Pop.	±%
1921	1,073	−20.0%
1930	1,146	+6.8%
1950	404	−64.7%
1961	613	+51.7%
1970	543	−11.4%

Year	Pop.	±%
1980	443	−18.4%
1991	385	−13.1%
2001	346	−10.1%
2011	272	−21.4%
2021	261	−4.0%

Source: Censuses

== Transport ==
There are no railways or major roads passing through the municipality.

== Sights ==
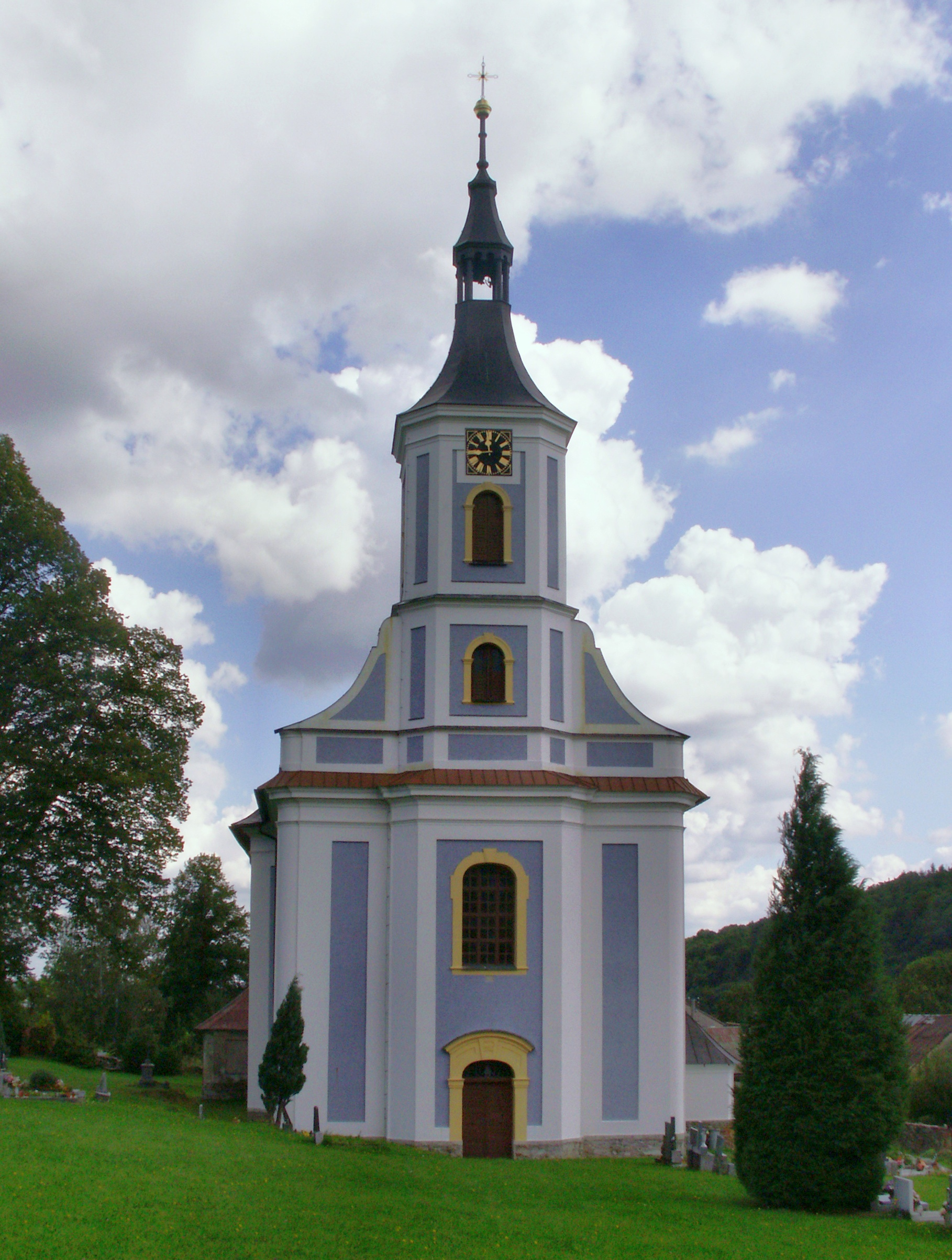
Church of the Holy Trinity

The town square is considered architecturally valuable. In the western corner of the square is the Church of the Holy Trinity, which was built in the late Baroque style in 1780–1783, with a cemetery located on the grounds. In the middle of the square are the Mining Memorial erected for the 650th anniversary of the town and a Baroque statue of the Virgin Mary Immaculate from 1739. The cemetery includes two valuable chapels from the 19th century.

A regional museum is located on the premises of the town hall.

On the right bank of the Osoblaha stands a linden tree that can be up to 1000 years old. It is one of the oldest and largest trees in the Czech Republic.

== Notable people ==
- Rudolf Mildner (1902–?), Austrian-German SS officer
