= Osobłoga =

Osobłoga Osoblaha
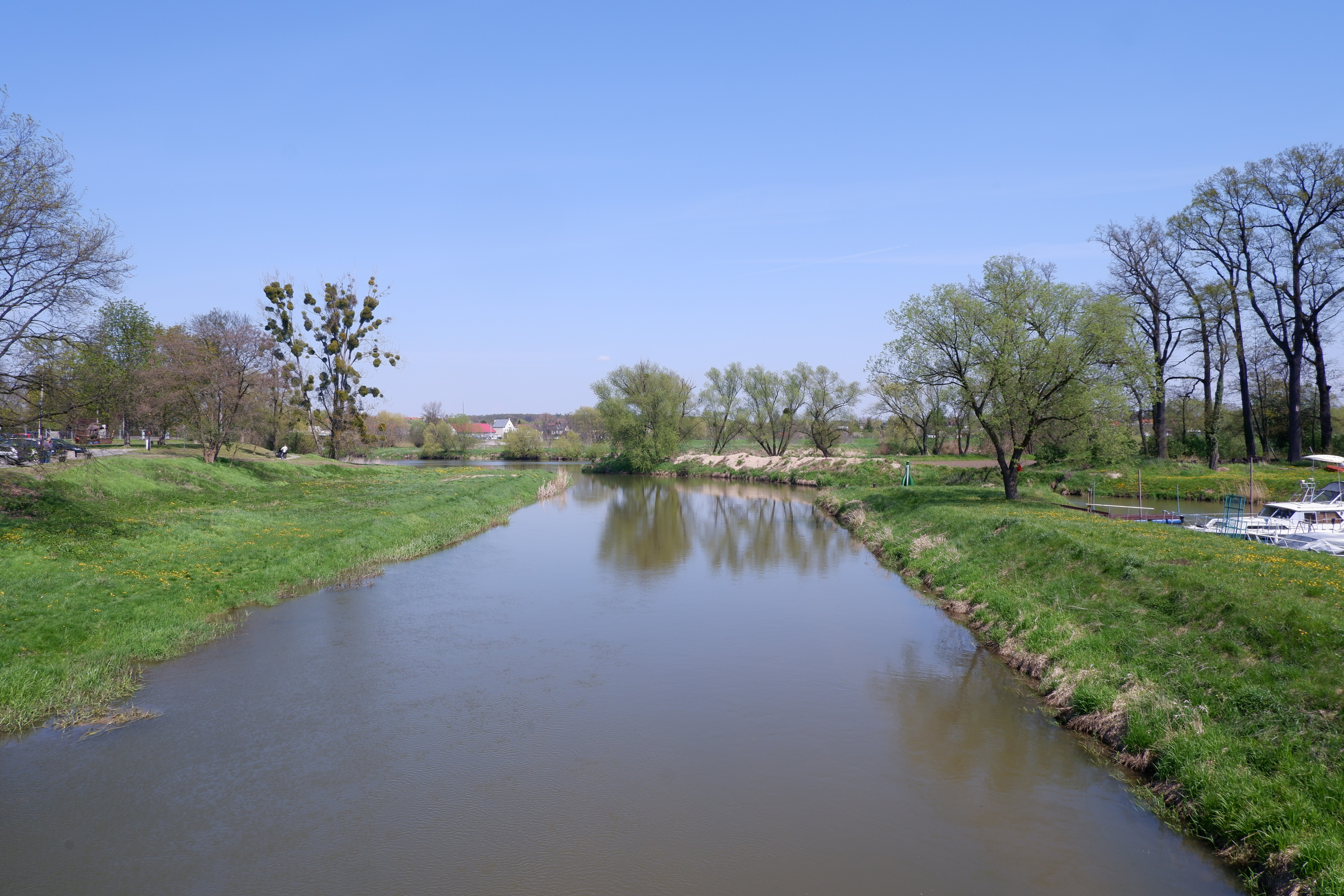
- The Osobłoga in Krapkowice

Location
- Countries: Czech Republic; Poland
- Region/ Voivodeship: Moravian-Silesian; Opole

Physical characteristics
- Source
  - location: Petrovice, Zlatohorská Highlands
  - coordinates: 50°12′42″N 17°25′25″E
  - elevation: 743 m (2,438 ft)
- Mouth
  - location: Oder
  - coordinates: 50°28′33″N 17°58′15″E
  - elevation: 158 m (518 ft)
- Length: 65.5 km (40.7 mi)
- Basin size: 921.1 km^{2} (355.6 sq mi)
- Discharge
  - average: 2.08 m^{3}/s (73 cu ft/s) on the Czech–Polish border

Basin features
- Progression: Oder→ Baltic Sea

The Osobłoga (Czech: Osoblaha, German: Hotzenplotz) is a river in the Czech Republic and Poland, a left tributary of the Oder. It flows through the Moravian-Silesian Region in the Czech Republic and through the Opole Voivodeship in Poland. It is 65.5 km (40.7 mi) long.

== Etymology ==
The origin of the name is unclear. The name is of pre-Slavic origin and there is a theory that name may be derived from the root as-, meaning 'dry'.

== Characteristic ==
The Osobłoga originates in the territory of Petrovice in the Zlatohorská Highlands at an elevation of 743 m (2,438 ft) and flows to Krapkowice, where it merges with the Oder River at an elevation of 158 m (518 ft). It is 65.5 km (40.7 mi) long, of which 36.1 km (22.4 mi) is in the Czech Republic. Its drainage basin has an area of 921.1 km^{2} (355.6 sq mi), of which 758 km^{2} (293 sq mi) is in Poland and 163.1 km^{2} (63.0 sq mi) is in the Czech Republic.

The longest tributaries of the Osobłoga are:

Tributary	Length (km)	Side
Prudnik / Prudník	36.1	left
Biała	35.2	left
Hrozová / Grozowy	19.9	right
Mušlov	13.9	right
Lužná	11.5	right

== Course ==
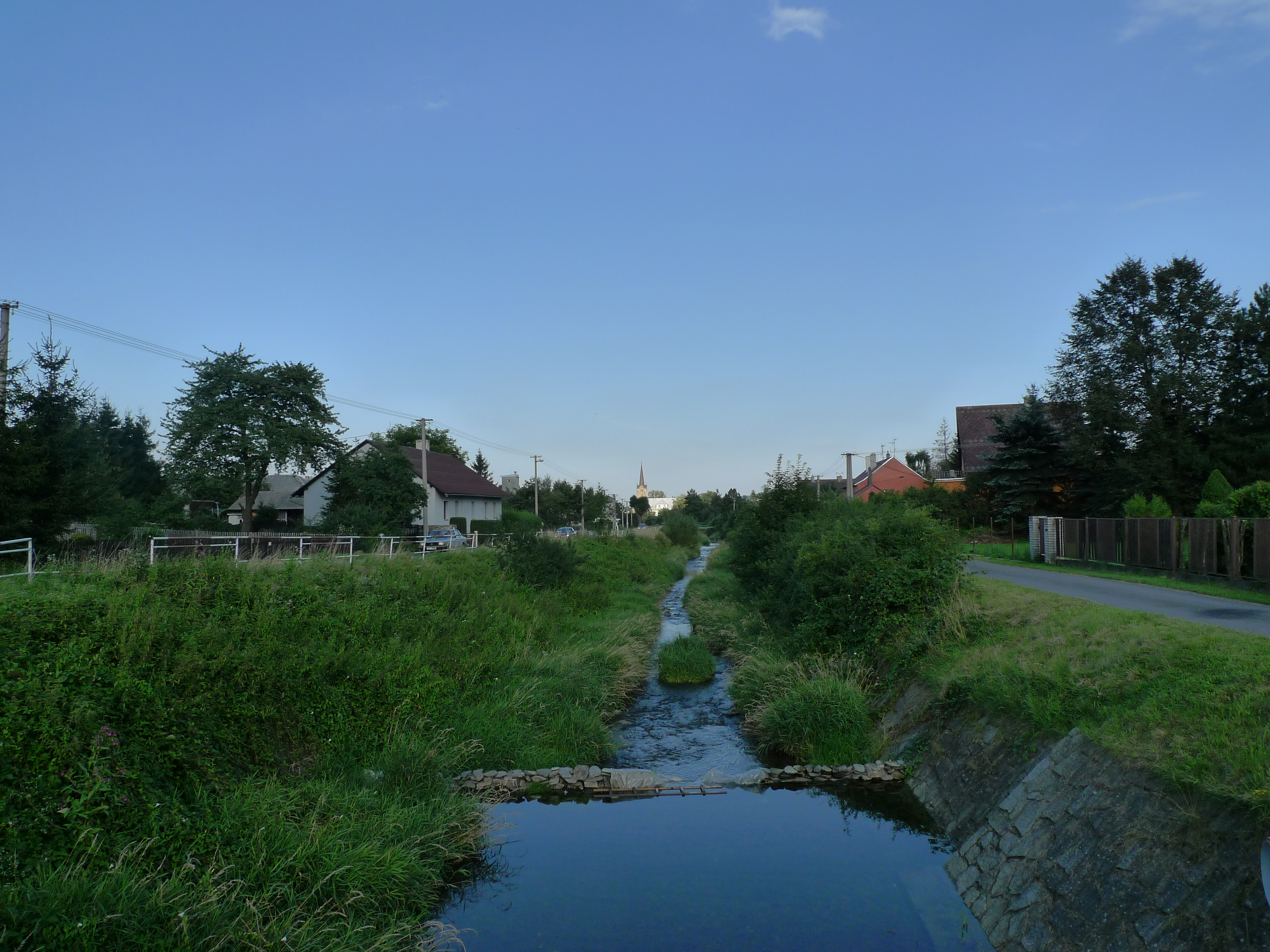
Upper course of the Osobłoga in Jindřichov

The river flows through the municipal territories of Petrovice, Janov, Jindřichov, Vysoká, Dívčí Hrad, Bohušov and Osoblaha in the Czech Republic and through the territories of the gminas of Głogówek, Głubczyce, Strzeleczki and Krapkowice in Poland.

== Bodies of water ==
There are no fishponds or reservoirs built on the Osobłoga.

== Fauna ==
Among the protected animal species living in the Osobłoga are the common minnow, Alpine bullhead and brook lamprey. The river is a nesting place for the common kingfisher.

== See also ==
- List of rivers of the Czech Republic
- List of rivers of Poland
