= Befehlshaber der Sicherheitspolizei und des SD =

Nazi SS and police official

Befehlshaber der Sicherheistpolizei und des SD
- SD sleeve insignia
- Type: Commanding officer
- Status: Abolished
- Abbreviation: BdS
- Member of: Schutzstaffel (SS)
- Reports to: Reich Security Main Office
- Appointer: Reinhard Heydrich (1939–1942); Heinrich Himmler (1942–1943); Ernst Kaltenbrunner (1943–1945)
- Precursor: Inspekteur der Sicherheistpolizei und des SD (IdS)
- Formation: 2 June 1939
- Abolished: 8 May 1945
- Deputy: Kommandeur der Sicherheitspolizei und des SD (KdS)

Befehlshaber der Sicherheitspolizei und des SD (BdS), or Commanders of the Security Police and the SD, were regional commanders of the Nazi Sicherheitspolizei (SiPo – security police) and the Sicherheitsdienst (SD – security service). They reported directly to the Reich Security Main Office (RSHA) of the Schutzstaffel (SS). The first of these positions was created in 1939 before the Second World War to administer security and intelligence functions in German-occupied Europe. They were instrumental in executing the Nazi policy of terror, mass murder and genocide during the Holocaust.

== Background ==
The Schutzstaffel (SS) was the elite paramilitary organization of the Nazi Party. In June 1936, Reichsführer-SS Heinrich Himmler was also appointed the Chief of German Police in Nazi Germany. One of Himmler's first actions was to place the Kriminalpolizei or Kripo (criminal police) and the Gestapo (secret state police) under a new umbrella organization called the Sicherheitspolizei (SiPo), or security police. He placed this under the command of Reinhard Heydrich who already headed the Gestapo. Heydrich's new office was called the Hauptamt Sicherheitspolizei (Security Police Main Office). Heydrich was also the chief of the Sicherheitsdienst (SD), the SS intelligence organization, in the separate Sicherheits Hauptamt (Security Main Office).

The local SD units were organized in SD-Oberabschnitte (main districts), whereas the more numerous Gestapo and Kripo units were organized in local Stelle (offices) and Leitstelle (lead offices). In order to establish more cohesion and coordination between these separate components, Heydrich created regional commands headed by an Inspekteur der Sicherheitspolizei und des SD (IdS) in the thirteen Wehrkreise (military districts). Each IdS oversaw and coordinated the separate local SiPo and SD units located throughout his jurisdiction. After the March 1938 Anschluss with Austria, an IdS command was established for the annexed state.

== Establishment ==
When Czechoslovakia was dismembered in March 1939, Bohemia-Moravia was not formally annexed to Germany, but established as a German protectorate. It became necessary to deploy outposts of the SiPo and SD, similar to the Leitstelle and Oberabschnitte in the Reich, to establish intelligence and security police functions in the newly occupied territory. To lead and coordinate these units, Heydrich created the post of Befehlshaber der Sicherheitspolizei und des SD (BdS) who reported directly to him, modeled on the existing IdS positions in Germany. The first BdS was appointed on 2 June 1939.

On 27 September 1939, just weeks after the outbreak of the Second World War, Himmler enacted a major reorganization of the security services by uniting them into one combined main office in SS headquarters. This new Reich Security Main Office (RSHA) was entrusted to Heydrich, bringing an even greater unity between the SiPo and the SD by combining the two separate Hauptamt.

== Organization and structure ==
Standard of a BdS if a general officer

Standard of a BdS if not a general officer

As the Wehrmacht conquered more of Europe, one BdS was appointed for each occupied country. The exceptions were the larger nations of France, the Soviet Union and Italy where multiple BdS commands were established. Each regional BdS oversaw several subordinate local offices, which in turn were led by a Kommandeur der Sicherheitspolizei und des SD (KdS). The chain of command ran from the RSHA in Berlin to the regional BdS and from them to the local KdS.

There was no specific designated rank for a BdS, but holders of the post generally ranged from SS-Standartenführer to SS-Brigadeführer. In most instances, the BdS obtained their instructions directly from Heydrich and his successors at RSHA. However, in certain emergency situations or for certain special tasks designated by Himmler, the senior SS commanders in the occupied areas, the Higher SS and Police Leaders (HSSPF) who were directly subordinate to Himmler, were authorized to utilize all units of the SS and the police and were therefore empowered to give instructions and orders to the BdS. Late in the war, as the approaching Allied forces threatened to turn border areas of the Reich into theaters of war, the existing IdS commands in Königsberg, Breslau and Salzburg were given the designation of BdS commands.

== Involvement in the Holocaust ==
The RSHA staff in Berlin actively directed anti-partisan and counter-espionage activities in the occupied territories, as well as the deportation of Jews to ghettos, concentration camps or extermination camps. The RSHA oversaw the Einsatzgruppen, death squads that were formed at the direction of Heydrich. The organizational structure of these units corresponded to the RSHA, and they sometimes were referred to as mobile RSHA units. They were recruited from all components of the RSHA (SD, Gestapo and Kripo), as well as personnel from the Ordnungspolizei (Orpo – order police) and the Waffen-SS. They operated in the German rear areas, systematically identifying and gathering up the Jewish population for extermination. As commanders of the SiPo and SD, the BdS were directly involved in the mass murders executed by the Einsatzgruppen. As the occupation administrations were established, the Einsatzgruppen and their subordinate Einsatzkommando sub-units were turned into static territorial SiPo and SD organizations headed by a BdS. In some instances, the same individual served as both the commander of the Einsatzgruppe and as the BdS; likewise, many an Einsatzkommando commander became a KdS. At the end of the war, several of the BdS took their own lives, and most of the rest were tried and convicted as war criminals, as illustrated in the following table.

== Table of selected BdS ==
Jurisdiction	HQ	BdS	Fate
Alsace	Strasbourg	Gustav Adolf Scheel; Erich Isselhorst	Arrested, 1945; sentenced to 5 years in a labor camp, 1947; released 1948; Sentenced to death, 1946 (UK) & 1947 (France); executed, February 1948
Belgium and Northern France	Brussels	Max Thomas; Walther Bierkamp	Suicide, December 1945; Suicide, May 1945
Bohemia and Moravia	Prague	Walter Stahlecker; Horst Böhme; Erwin Weinmann	Killed in action by Soviet partisans, March 1942; Missing, 1945; declared dead, 1954; Missing, 1945; declared dead, 1949
Denmark	Copenhagen	Rudolf Mildner; Otto Bovensiepen	Arrested, 1945; released, 1949; missing; declared dead, 1951; Arrested, 1945; sentenced to death, 1948; commuted to life, 1950; released 1953
France	Paris	Helmut Knochen; Friedrich Suhr	Sentenced to death, 1947 (UK) & 1954 (France); commuted to life in prison, 1958; released, 1962; Suicide in custody, May 1946
General Government	Kraków	Bruno Streckenbach; Karl Eberhard Schöngarth; Walther Bierkamp	Indicted, 1973; dismissed on health grounds 1974 Sentenced to death and executed, May 1946 (See above)
Greece	Athens	Walter Blume	Sentenced to death, 1948; commuted to 25 years, 1951; released, 1955
Italian Social Republic	Verona; Bolzano	Wilhelm Harster	Arrested, 1945; sentenced to 12 years, 1949; released, 1953; arrested 1966; sentenced to 15 years, 1967; released, 1968
Lorraine	Metz	Anton Dunckern	Arrested, 1945; sentenced to 20 years, 1953; released, 1954
Netherlands	The Hague	Wilhelm Harster; Erich Naumann; Karl Eberhard Schöngarth	(See above); Arrested, 1945; sentenced to death, 1948; executed, June 1951 (See above)
Norway	Oslo	Walter Stahlecker; Heinrich Fehlis	(See above); Suicide, May 1945
Operational Zone of the Adriatic Littoral	Trieste	Emanuel Schäfer	Arrested and sentenced to 21 months, 1951; released, 1953; rearrested and sentenced to 6.5 years, 1953; released, 1956
Ostland	Riga	Walter Stahlecker; Heinz Jost; Erich Ehrlinger; Humbert Achamer-Pifrader; Friedrich Panzinger; Wilhelm Fuchs	(See above); Arrested, 1945; sentenced to life, 1948; commuted to 10 years and released, 1951; Arrested, 1958; sentenced to 12 years, 1961; released, 1965 Killed in an airstrike, April 1945; Arrested, 1946; sentenced to 25 years, 1952; released, 1955; rearrested, suicide in custody, 1959; Arrested, 1945; sentenced to death, 1946; executed, 1947
Serbia	Belgrade	Wilhelm Fuchs; Emanuel Schäfer	(See above) (See above)
Slovakia	Bratislava	Josef Witiska	Suicide in custody, October 1946
Ukraine	Kiev	Max Thomas	(See above)

== Sources ==
- Höhne, Heinz (1971). The Order of the Death's Head: The Story of Hitler's SS. New York: Ballantine Books. ISBN 0-345-28333-3.
- Buchheim, Hans (1983). Anatomy of the SS State. Academy Chicago Publishers. ISBN 978-0-586-08028-3.
- McNab, Chris (2009). The SS: 1923–1945. London: Amber Books. ISBN 978-1-906-62649-5.
- Yerger, Mark C. (1997). The Allgemeine-SS: The Commands, Units and Leaders of the General SS. Schiffer Publishing Ltd. ISBN 0-7643-0145-4.
