= Bavarian Political Police =

1930s police force in Bavaria, Nazi Germany

- Bayerische Politische Polizei

Agency overview
- Formed: 1933
- Preceding agency: Political department of the Munich Police
- Dissolved: 1936
- Superseding agency: Gestapo
- Jurisdiction: Political opponents of the Nazi regime
- Headquarters: Munich
- Agency executives: Heinrich Himmler; Reinhard Heydrich; Jakob Beck; Walter Stepp

The Bavarian Political Police (German: Bayerische Politische Polizei), BPP, was a police force in the German state of Bavaria, active from 1933 to 1936. It served as a forerunner of the Gestapo in Bavaria, the secret police during the Nazi era, and was predominantly engaged in the persecution of political opponents of the Nazis.

The combination of political police and concentration camps under the control of the Schutzstaffel (SS) in Bavaria became the model for all of Nazi Germany, with Heinrich Himmler, within a short time, controlling all police forces in the country. Munich, Bavaria's capital, became the testing ground for the Nazi terror of the following twelve years.

== History ==
=== Background ===
Bavaria, Germany's second-largest state after Prussia, and specifically its capital Munich was the breeding ground of the Nazis. It was Munich where the Nazi Party was founded and where Adolf Hitler's political career began. The party newspaper, Völkischer Beobachter, and Hitler's Mein Kampf were published in Munich. For these reasons, the city was declared the "Capital of the movement" in 1935 and remained the spiritual capital of Nazi Germany even when Berlin was the political centre.

=== Nazi Germany ===
After Adolf Hitler's rise to power in Germany in January 1933, the Nazis took control in Bavaria on 9 March 1933. They split the Munich police's political department into a separate entity, the Bavarian Political Police (BPP). The Bavarian Political Police operated outside the state law framework. The new force experienced no significant staffing changes compared to the pre-Nazi era, with almost all previous staff being either retained or new staff coming from the existing Bavarian police force.

The Bavarian Political Police pre-dated its Prussian counterpart, the Gestapo, which was formed on 26 April 1933. In the early stages, the two organisations were rivals, with Hermann Göring controlling the Prussian version and Heinrich Himmler, the Bavarian unit. On 9 March 1933, Adolf Wagner, acting Bavarian minister of the interior under Reich Governor of Bavaria Franz Ritter von Epp, appointed Himmler chief of the Munich Metropolitan Police. After the appointment became official by 1 April 1933, Himmler was given the BPP's overall command, with the title of "Politischer Polizeikommandeur Bayern. Himmler was now subordinate, if only nominally, under Wagner and had command over all political police in the state. Himmler then appointed his second in command, Reinhard Heydrich, chief of Department IV, the political police. The Bavarian Political Police was given authority above all other police forces in the state and, from 10 April, was authorised to take people into protective custody. In addition, Himmler obtained control over the Nazi concentration camps, the ones already established and the ones planned. The first major concentration camp, initially for political prisoners, was opened at Dachau in 1933, as local jails were soon at capacity because of the large number of arrests after the Nazis took power.

The Bavarian model of control over the police and the newly established concentration camps by the SS became the blueprint for all of Germany. Within a short time, all German state police forces would be organized in the same way. This model was different from Prussia's. Prussia's state government initially retained some control over these entities. Munich became the test site for the future Nazi terror.

Staff from the Bavarian Political Police were instrumental in helping Himmler take control of the entire German police force. Key members from the Bavarian Political Police that would later rise to high ranks within the SS and the Gestapo were Heydrich, Heinrich Müller, Josef Albert Meisinger, Reinhard Flesch, Franz Josef Huber, and Edmund Trinkl.

In Bavaria, the political police at first only targeted communists and members of the Social Democratic Party of Germany, with thousands of people being taken into protective custody. Instrumental in destroying communist resistance in Munich was the informer Max Troll, who denounced over 250 fellow communists to the BPP. From June 1933, this was expanded to non-Nazi members of the national- and state parliaments being arrested, as well as members of the Bavarian People's Party.

Eventually, Himmler would gain control of all the police in Germany. On 10 February 1936, a law was passed allowing the police to act completely independent of the law, free to arrest, deport, torture, and murder people. On 17 June 1936, Adolf Hitler decreed police forces' unification in Germany and named Himmler Chief of German Police, which had previously been controlled through state law. This move gave Himmler operational control over Germany's entire detective and political police.

The Bavarian Political Police, now part of the Gestapo, became the Geheime Staatspolizei Staatspolizeileitstelle München, led by Walter Stepp, who had been in charge of the force since 1935. Sepp attempted to retain some independence from the Gestapo headquarters in Berlin and was eventually dismissed in 1937 over the issue. Sepp, in turn, had succeeded Jakob Beck, who led the Bavarian Political Police from April 1934 to February 1935, acting for Heydrich.

After integration into the Gestapo, the Bavarian branch was led by Walter Sepp (until 1937), Lothar Beutel (1937–1939), Erich Isselhorst (1939–1942) and Oswald Schäfer (1942–1945).
