= Inspekteur der Sicherheitspolizei und des SD =

Nazi SS and police official

- SD sleeve insignia
- Type: Commanding officer
- Status: Abolished
- Abbreviation: IdS
- Member of: Schutzstaffel (SS)
- Reports to: Reich Security Main Office
- Appointer: Reinhard Heydrich (1936–1942); Heinrich Himmler (1942–1943); Ernst Kaltenbrunner (1943–1945)
- Formation: 1 October 1936
- Abolished: 8 May 1945

Inspekteur der Sicherheitspolizei und des SD (IdS), or Inspectors of the Security Police and the SD, were regional commanders of the Sicherheitspolizei (SiPo – security police) and the Sicherheitsdienst (SD – security service) in Nazi Germany. These positions were created by Reinhard Heydrich in 1936 to coordinate security and intelligence functions inside the Reich. They reported directly to Heydrich in the two main offices of the SiPo and SD (in September 1939, combined into the Reich Security Main Office, or RSHA) at the Schutzstaffel (SS) headquarters. The IdS were instrumental in executing the Nazi policies of intimidation and persecution of German Jews and, ultimately, the mass murder and genocide of the Holocaust.

== Background ==
The Schutzstaffel (SS) was the elite paramilitary organization of the Nazi Party. In June 1936, Reichsführer-SS Heinrich Himmler was also appointed the Chief of German Police in Nazi Germany. One of Himmler's first actions was to place the Kriminalpolizei or Kripo (criminal police) and the Gestapo (secret state police) under a new umbrella organization called the Sicherheitspolizei (SiPo), or security police. He placed this organization under the command of Reinhard Heydrich who already headed the Gestapo. Heydrich's new office was called the Hauptamt Sicherheitspolizei (Security Police Main Office). Heydrich was also the chief of the Sicherheitsdienst (SD), the SS intelligence organization, in the separate Sicherheits Hauptamt (Security Main Office).

== Establishment ==
The local SD units were organized in SD-Abschnitte (districts) or Oberabschnitte (main districts), whereas the more numerous Gestapo and Kripo units were organized in local Stelle (offices) and Leitstelle (lead offices). On 1 October 1936, in order to establish more cohesion and coordination between these separate components, Heydrich created regional commands headed by an Inspekteur der Sicherheitspolizei und des SD (IdS) in the thirteen Wehrkreise (military districts). Each IdS oversaw and coordinated the separate local SiPo and SD units located throughout his jurisdiction.

== Expansion ==
After the March 1938 Anschluss incorporated Austria into the Reich, the annexed state was divided into two new Wehrkreise with headquarters in Vienna and Salzburg, where two new IdS commands were established. On 27 September 1939, just weeks after the outbreak of the Second World War, Himmler enacted a major reorganization of the security services by uniting them into one combined main office in SS headquarters. This new Reich Security Main Office (RSHA) was entrusted to Heydrich, bringing an even greater unity between the SiPo and the SD by combining the two separate Hauptamt (departments). Following the conquest of Poland in October 1939, two additional Wehrkreise and corresponding IdS commands were established in Danzig and Posen for the areas of Poland that were annexed to the Reich.

As the Wehrmacht conquered more of Europe, it became necessary to deploy outposts of the SiPo and SD, similar to the Leitstelle and Oberabschnitte in the Reich, to establish intelligence and security police functions in the newly occupied territories. Since there were no existing Wehrkreise in these lands, Heydrich created the new post of Befehlshaber der Sicherheitspolizei und des SD (BdS – Commander of the Security Police and the SD) modeled on the existing IdS positions in Germany. Late in the war, as the approaching Allied forces threatened to turn border areas of the Reich into theaters of war, the existing IdS commands in Königsberg, Breslau and Salzburg were redesignated as BdS commands.

== Organization and chain of command ==
Standard of an IdS if a general officer

Standard of an IdS if not a general officer

There was no specific designated rank for a IdS, but holders of the post generally ranged from SS-Obersturmbannführer to SS-Brigadeführer. When the IdS were first appointed, they reported directly to Heydrich who was the Chef der Sicherheitspolizei und des SD, and obtained their instructions directly from him. However, on 13 November 1937, Himmler authorized the creation of the position of Higher SS and Police Leader (HSSPF) in each Wehrkreis in the event of a mobilization. The HSSPF were directly subordinate to Himmler and were to serve as his deputies for the purpose of coordinating and integrating all local and regional SS and police formations into the Reich's defense organization. Once the HSSPF began to be appointed at the time of the Anschluss, they were authorized to utilize all units of the SS and the police in their jurisdiction. Heydrich and his successors at RSHA continued to be the direct administrative superiors of the IdS. However, in emergency situations or for certain special tasks designated by Himmler, the HSSPF were authorized to issue operational instructions and orders to the IdS. In those special circumstances, they could interpose themselves into the normal chain of command from the RSHA to the IdS.

== Involvement in the Holocaust ==
The IdS, as the regional commanders of the security police and intelligence agencies, were charged with protecting the German Reich from perceived subversive internal "enemies of the state", a definition that broadly encompassed Communists, Socialists, other political opponents, Freemasons, Jehovah's Witnesses, homosexuals, pacifists, the "work-shy", the "asocial" (including petty criminals, prostitutes and alcoholics) and, above all, Jews. At first, this meant that the security services were active participants in the racial policies of discrimination, intimidation, harassment, persecution and Aryanization of German Jews. When arrested by the Gestapo, individuals could be jailed, tortured and even executed. Once the Nazi policy progressed to what would become the Final Solution, the IdS and their staffs played a leading role in rounding up and deporting German Jews to ghettos, concentration camps or extermination camps, thus directly facilitating the mass murders of the Holocaust committed by the Nazi regime.

At the Nuremberg trials, the International Military Tribunal found both the SD and the Gestapo to be criminal organizations, and that their members subsequently could be convicted of the crime of membership and be punished with fines, imprisonment or death. In its judgment of 30 September 1946, the tribunal pointed out the actions taken by these organizations within the borders of the Reich that would have fallen under the purview of the IdS, taking special note of their role in the Kristallnacht pogrom of November 1938:

As the Nazi programme of anti-Semitic persecution increased in intensity the role played by these groups became increasingly important. In the early morning of 10th November, 1938, Heydrich sent a telegram to all offices of the Gestapo and SD giving instructions for the organisation of the pogroms of that date and instructing them to arrest as many Jews as the prisons could hold "especially rich ones," but to be careful that those arrested were healthy and not too old. By 11th November, 1938, 20,000 Jews had been arrested and many were sent to concentration camps. On 24th January, 1939, Heydrich, the Chief of the Security Police and SD, was charged with furthering the emigration and evacuation of Jews from Germany … Local offices of the Gestapo were used first to supervise the emigration of Jews and later to deport them to the East …

== IdS commands ==
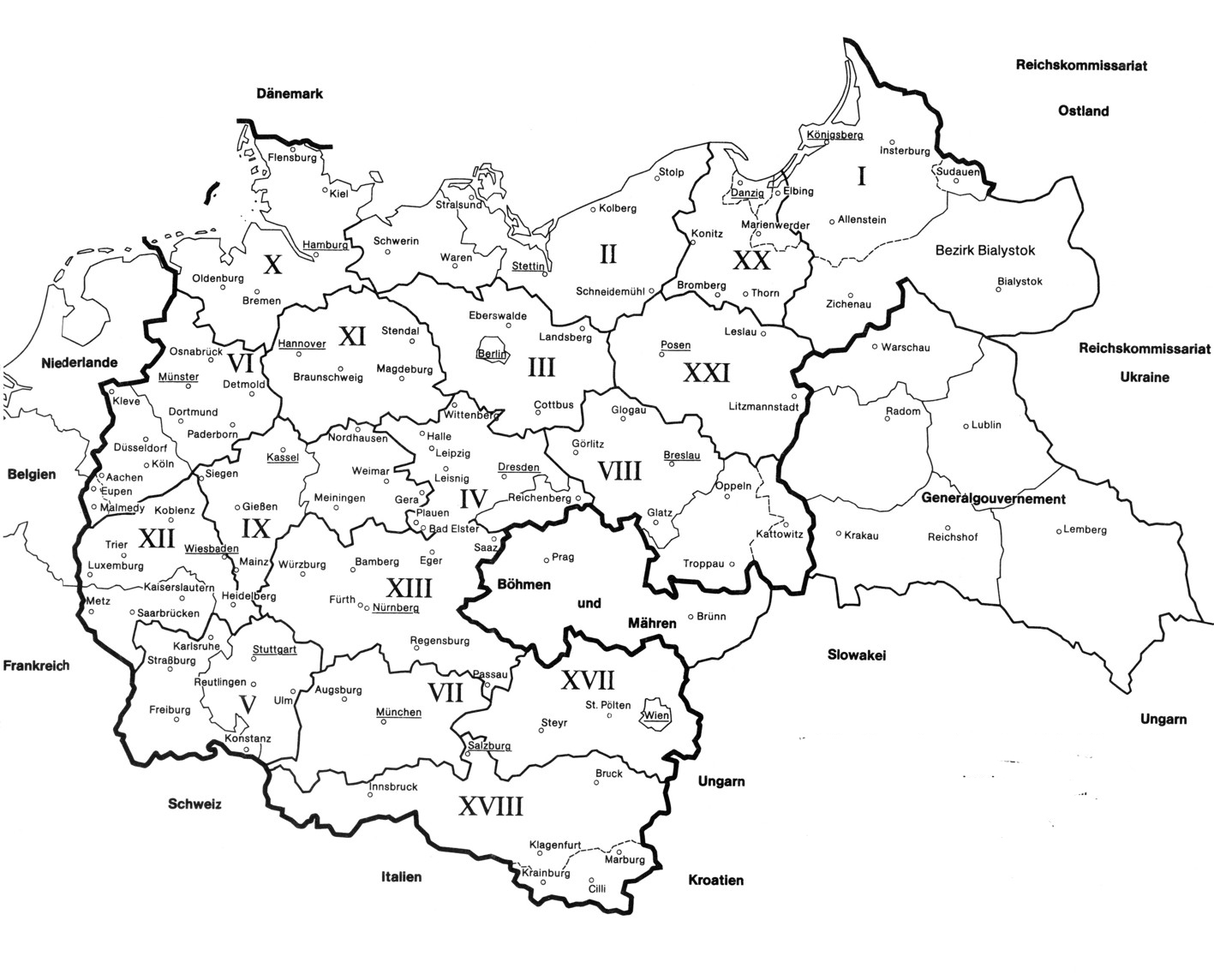
Map of the Wehrkreise in 1943-1944

| Wehrkreis | HQ | Year formed |
|---|---|---|
| I | Königsberg | 1936 |
| II | Stettin | 1936 |
| III | Berlin | 1936 |
| IV | Dresden | 1936 |
| V | Stuttgart | 1936 |
| VI | Münster | 1936 |
| VII | Munich | 1936 |
| VIII | Breslau | 1936 |
| IX | Kassel | 1936 |
| X | Hamburg | 1936 |
| XI | Hanover | 1936 |
| XII | Wiesbaden | 1936 |
| XIII | Nuremberg | 1936 |
| XVII | Vienna | 1938 |
| XIII | Salzburg | 1938 |
| XX | Danzig | 1939 |
| XXI | Posen | 1939 |

== Sources ==
- Höhne, Heinz (1971). The Order of the Death's Head: The Story of Hitler's SS. New York: Ballantine Books. ISBN 0-345-28333-3.
- Buchheim, Hans (1983). Anatomy of the SS State. Academy Chicago Publishers. ISBN 978-0-586-08028-3.
- McNab, Chris (2009). The SS: 1923–1945. London: Amber Books. ISBN 978-1-906-62649-5.
- Mitcham, Samuel W. (1985). Hitler's legions: The German army order of battle, World War II. London: Leo Cooper/Secker & Warburg. ISBN 978-0-436-28200-3.
- Yerger, Mark C. (1997). The Allgemeine-SS: The Commands, Units and Leaders of the General SS. Schiffer Publishing Ltd. ISBN 0-7643-0145-4.
