= Babi Yar memorials =

Ukrainian WWII massacre memorials around the world

Babi Yar memorials

Babi Yar, a ravine near Kyiv, was the scene of possibly the largest shooting massacre during the Holocaust. After the war, commemoration efforts encountered serious difficulty because of the policy of the Soviet Union. After the dissolution of the Soviet Union, a number of memorials were erected. The creation of the Babyn Yar Holocaust Memorial Center was initiated in 2016.

== Commemoration and Soviet policy ==
Soviet leadership did not identify Jewishness as a particular category of the victims of the Babi Yar tragedy; instead, it presented the atrocities as 'murder of peaceful Soviet people' and included the Jews among the wider Soviet populace. The first draft report of the Extraordinary State Commission (Чрезвычайная Государственная Комиссия), dated December 25, 1943 was officially censored in February 1944 as follows:

Draft version	Published version
"The Hitlerist bandits committed mass murder of the Jewish population. They announced that on September 29, 1941, all the Jews were required to arrive to the corner of Melnykova and Dorohozhytska streets and bring their documents, money and valuables. The butchers marched them to Babi Yar, took away their belongings, then shot them."	"The Hitlerist bandits brought thousands of civilians to the corner of Melnykova and Dorohozhytska streets. The butchers marched them to Babi Yar, took away their belongings, then shot them."

The Soviets accurately reported the total number of Babi Yar dead, but they did not identify their ethnicity until decades later. Even then, they did not accurately represent the number of Roma who were murdered.

== Monuments at Babi Yar ==
After the war, several attempts were made to erect a memorial at Babi Yar to commemorate the fate of the Jewish victims. A turning point was Yevgeny Yevtushenko's 1961 poem on Babi Yar, which begins "Nad Babim Yarom pamyatnikov nyet" ("There are no monuments for Babi Yar"); it is also the subject of each of the five movements of Shostakovich's Symphony No. 13.

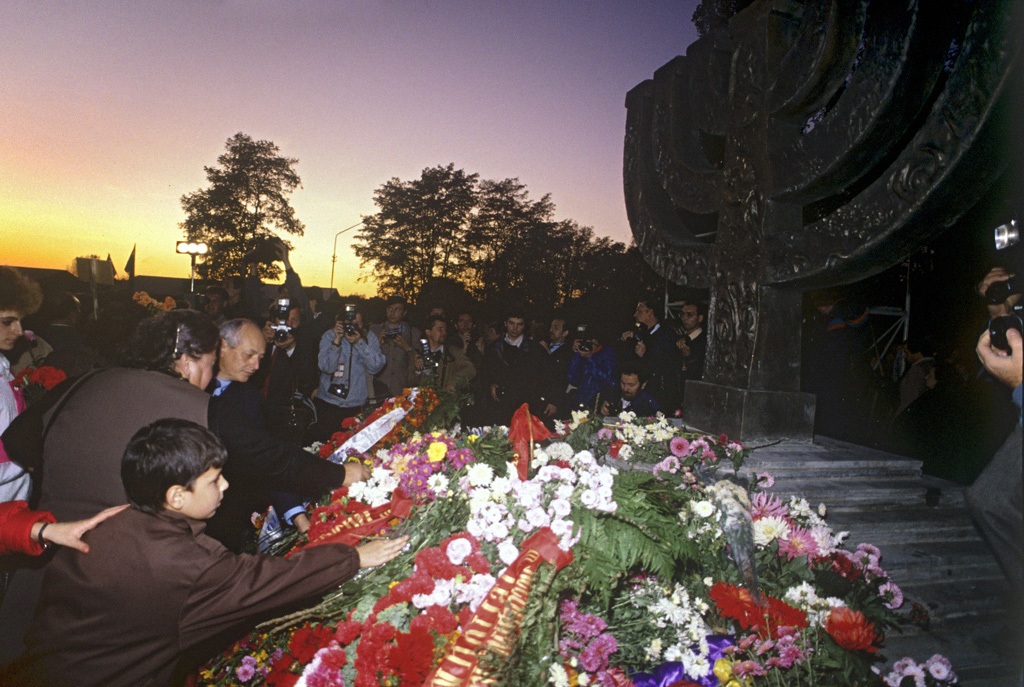
Wreath-laying ceremony as part of the week of Babi Yar tragedy commemoration (1991)

An official memorial for Soviet citizens shot at Babi Yar was erected in 1976.

After the dissolution of the Soviet Union in 1991, the Ukrainian government allowed the establishment of a separate memorial specifically identifying the Jewish victims. The creation of the Babyn Yar Holocaust Memorial Center was initiated in 2016.

The monuments to commemorate the numerous events associated with Babi Yar tragedy include:

- Monument to Soviet citizens and POWs shot by the Nazi occupiers at Babi Yar (opened in July 1976).
- Menorah-shaped monument to the Jews (about 100,000) massacred at Babi Yar (opened on Sept. 29, 1991, 50 years after the first mass killing of the Jews at Babi Yar).
- Wooden cross in memory of the 621 Ukrainian nationalists, including Olena Teliha and her husband, murdered by the German Nazis in 1942 (installed in 1992)
- Oak Cross marking the place where two Ukrainian Orthodox Christian priests were shot on November 6, 1941, for anti-German agitation; installed in 2000
- Monument to children killed at Babi Yar, opened in 2001 near the Dorohozhychi metro station.
- Magen David shaped stone marking the site for a planned Jewish community center, installed in 2001. Construction of the center was suspended, however, because of disputes over its specific location and scope of activities.
- Monument to Ostarbeiters and concentration camp prisoners; installed in 2005 at the corner of Dorohozhytska and Oranzheriyna Streets, close to the 1976 monument
- Monument to victims of the 1961 Kurenivka mudslide in Kyiv; installed in 2006, 45 years after the disaster killed hundreds of local residents and workers.
- Monument to Tatiana Markus, a member of the anti-Nazi underground in Kiev, opened December 1, 2009.
- Three tombs over a steep ravine edge with black metal crosses, installed by an unknown volunteer. One cross has an inscription: "People were killed in 1941 at this place, too. May God rest their souls."
- Мonument "The Gypsy Wagon" in memory of the victims of the Roma Genocide from 1941 to 1943, opened September 23, 2016.
- Monument Olena Teliha, unveiled on 25 February, 2017.

=== Damage ===
On the night of 16 July 2006, the memorial dedicated to the Jewish victims was vandalized. Several gravestones, the foundation of the commemorative sledge-stone, and several steps leading to the Menorah memorial were damaged. The Ministry of Foreign Affairs of Ukraine issued a statement condemning the act of vandalism.

On 1 March 2022, the complex which includes both the memorial and the cemetery for victims the Babi Yar massacre was hit by a missile attack carried out by the Russian Federation during the 2022 Russian invasion of Ukraine.

=== Images ===
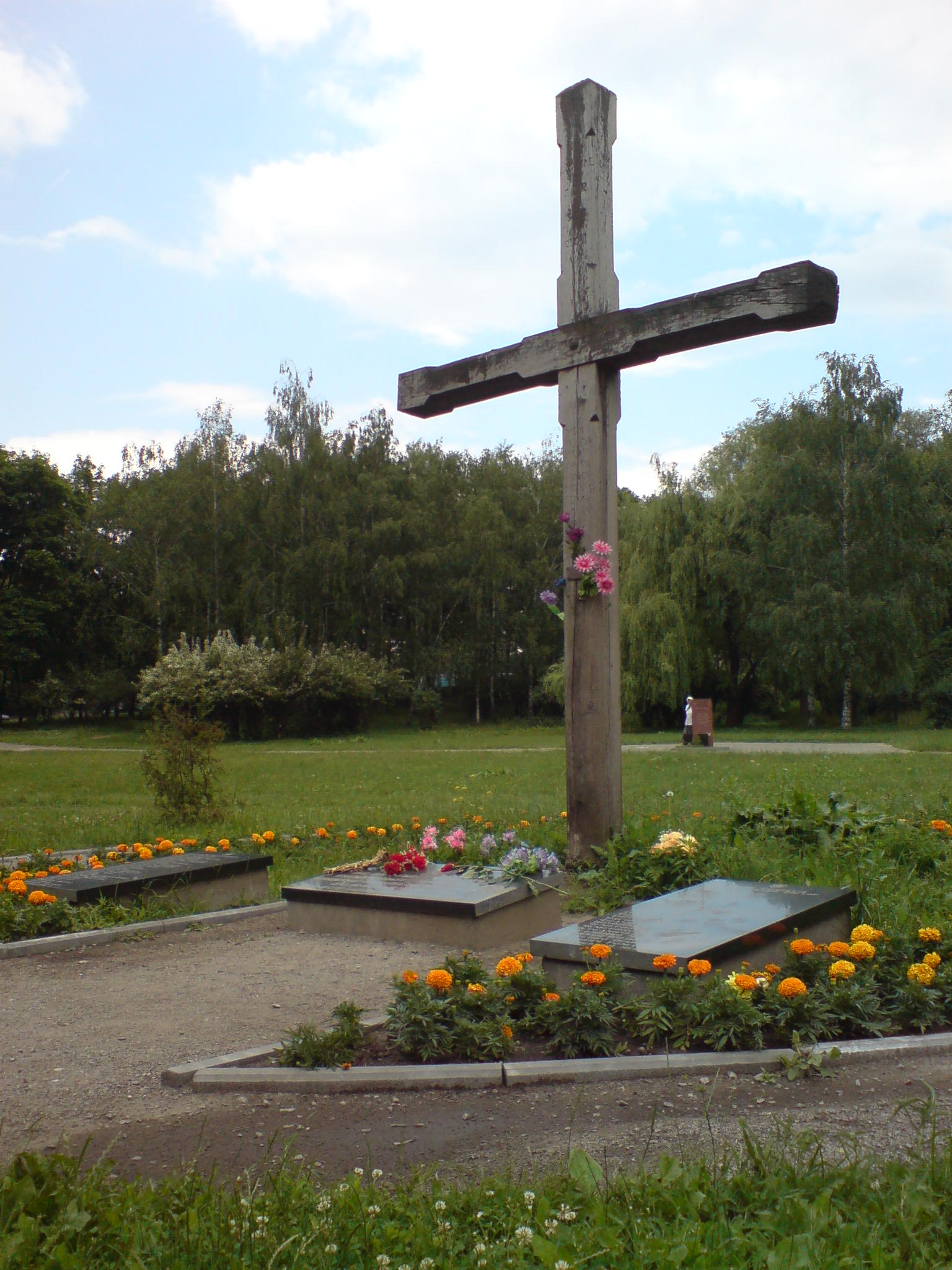
Wooden cross in memory of 621 Ukrainian nationalists murdered in 1942 (1992)

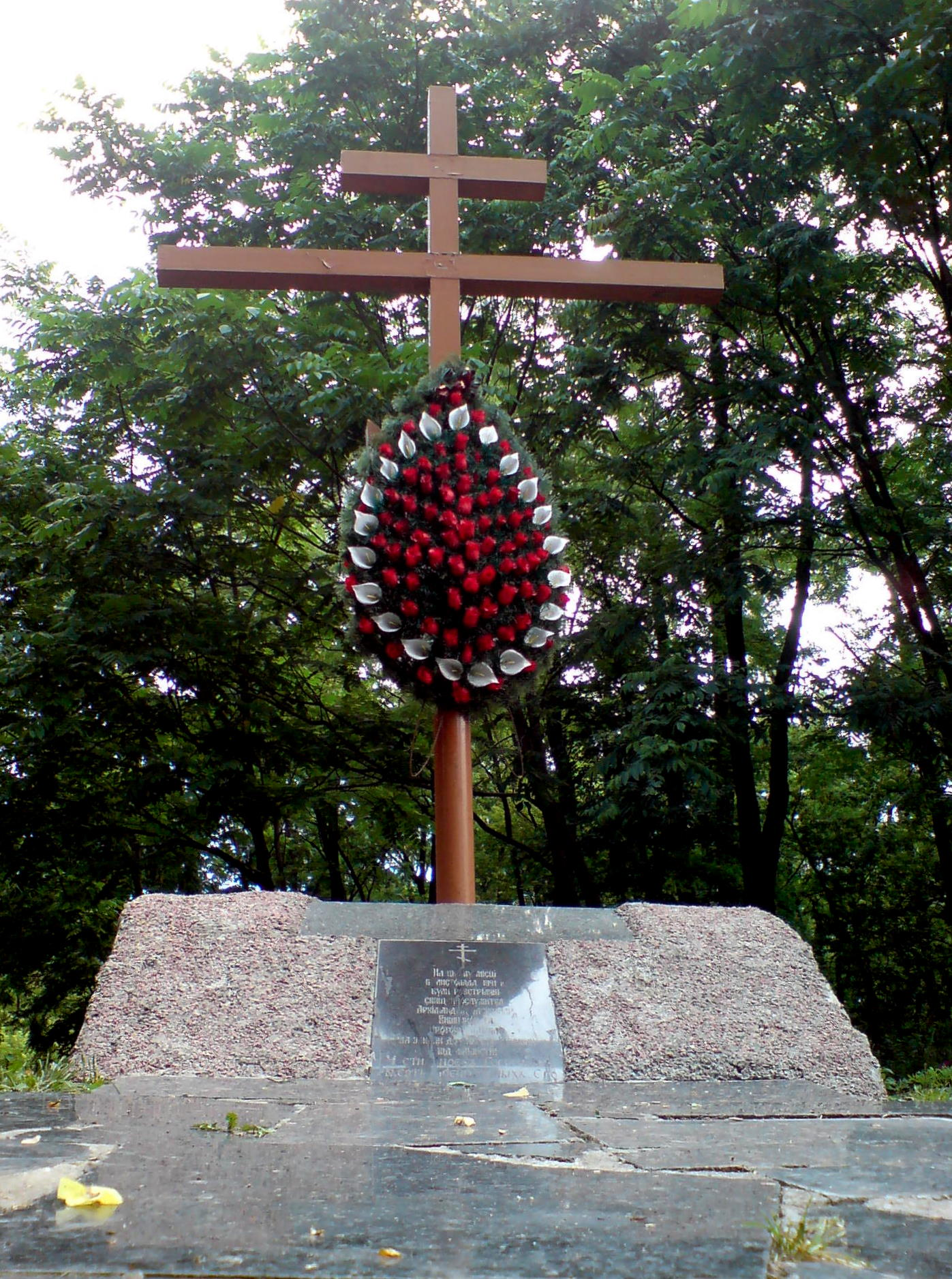
Cross at the place where two Orthodox Christian priests were murdered in November 1941 (2001)

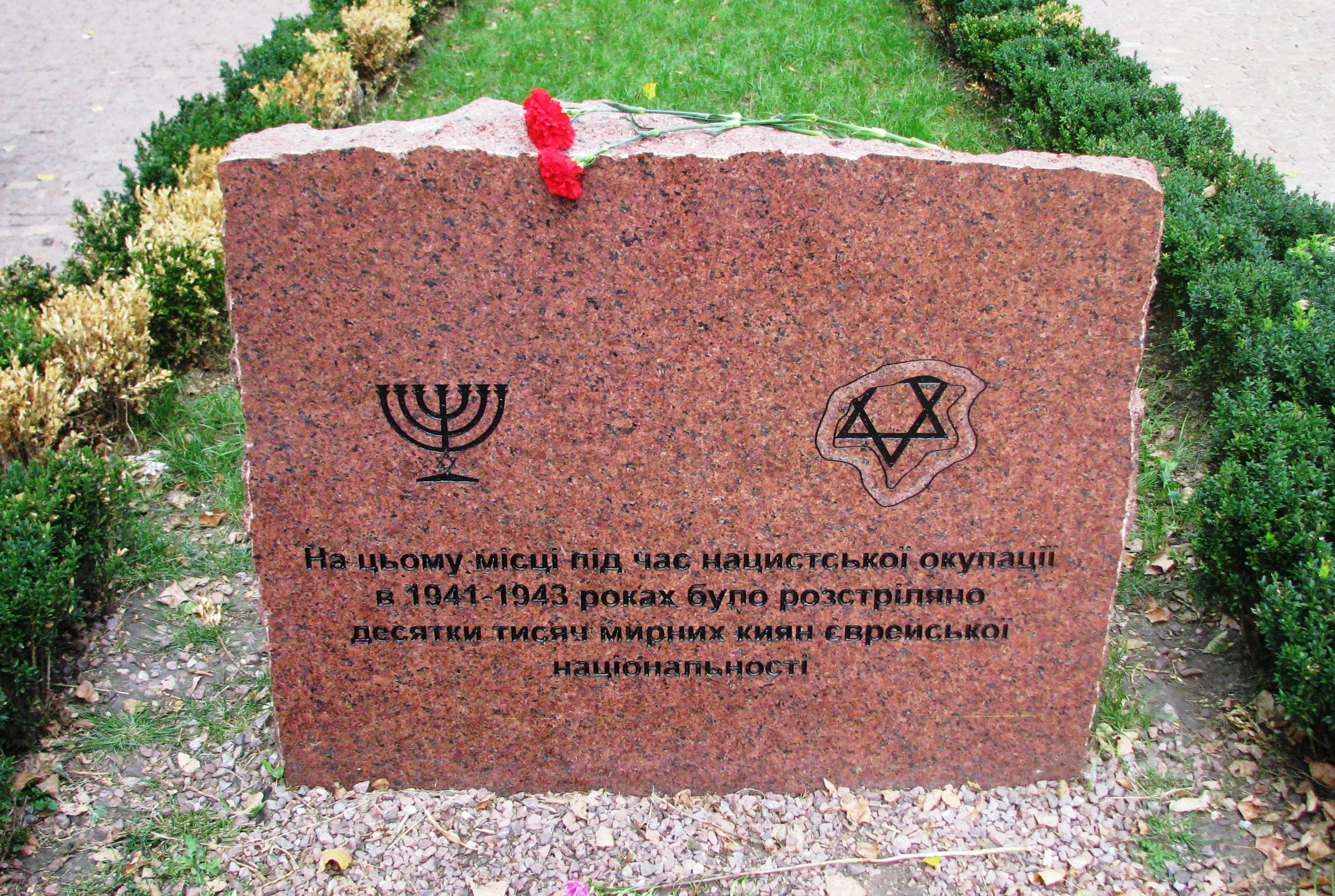
The memorial stone

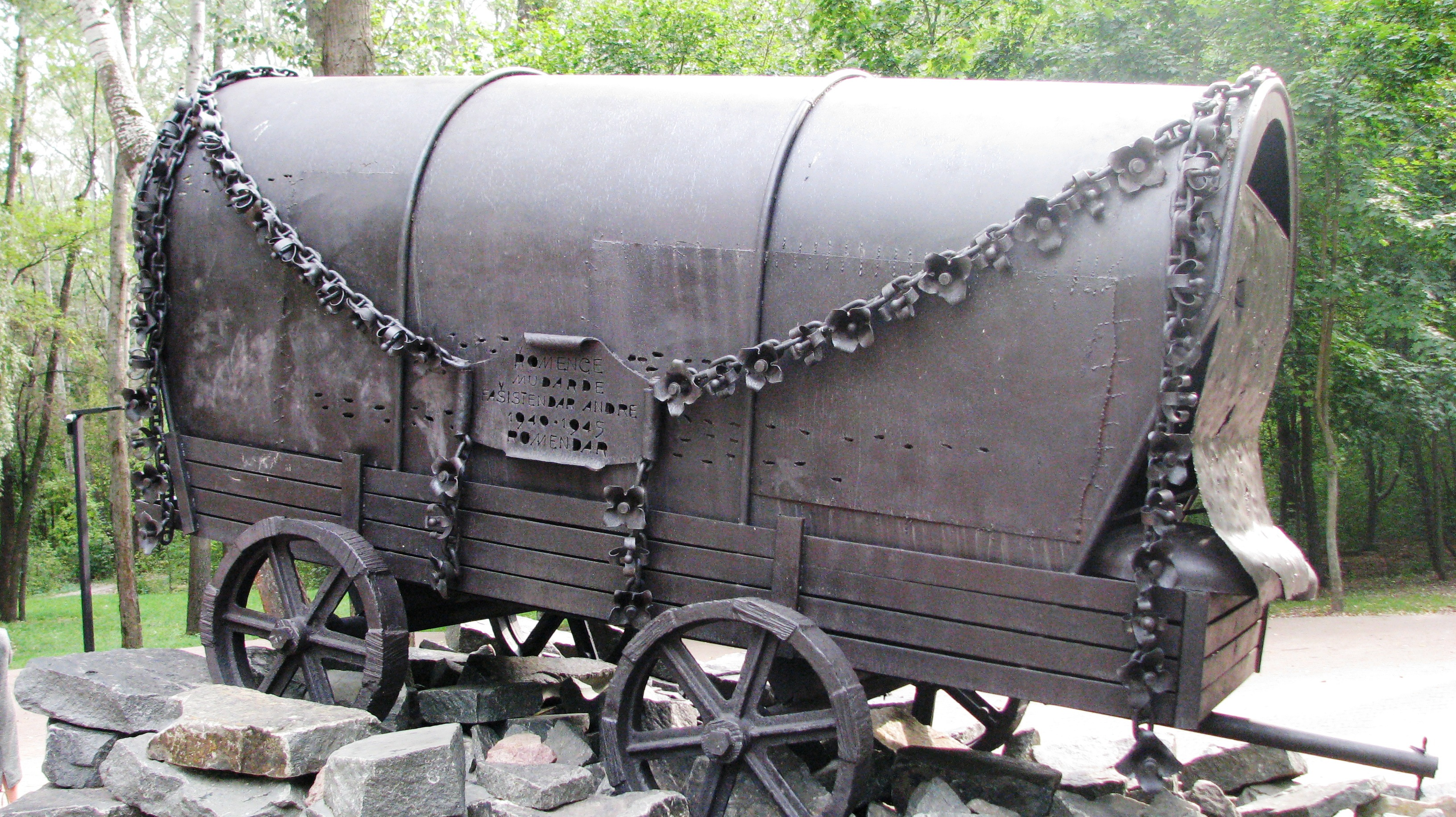
Мonument "The Gypsy wagon" to the murdered Roma (2016)

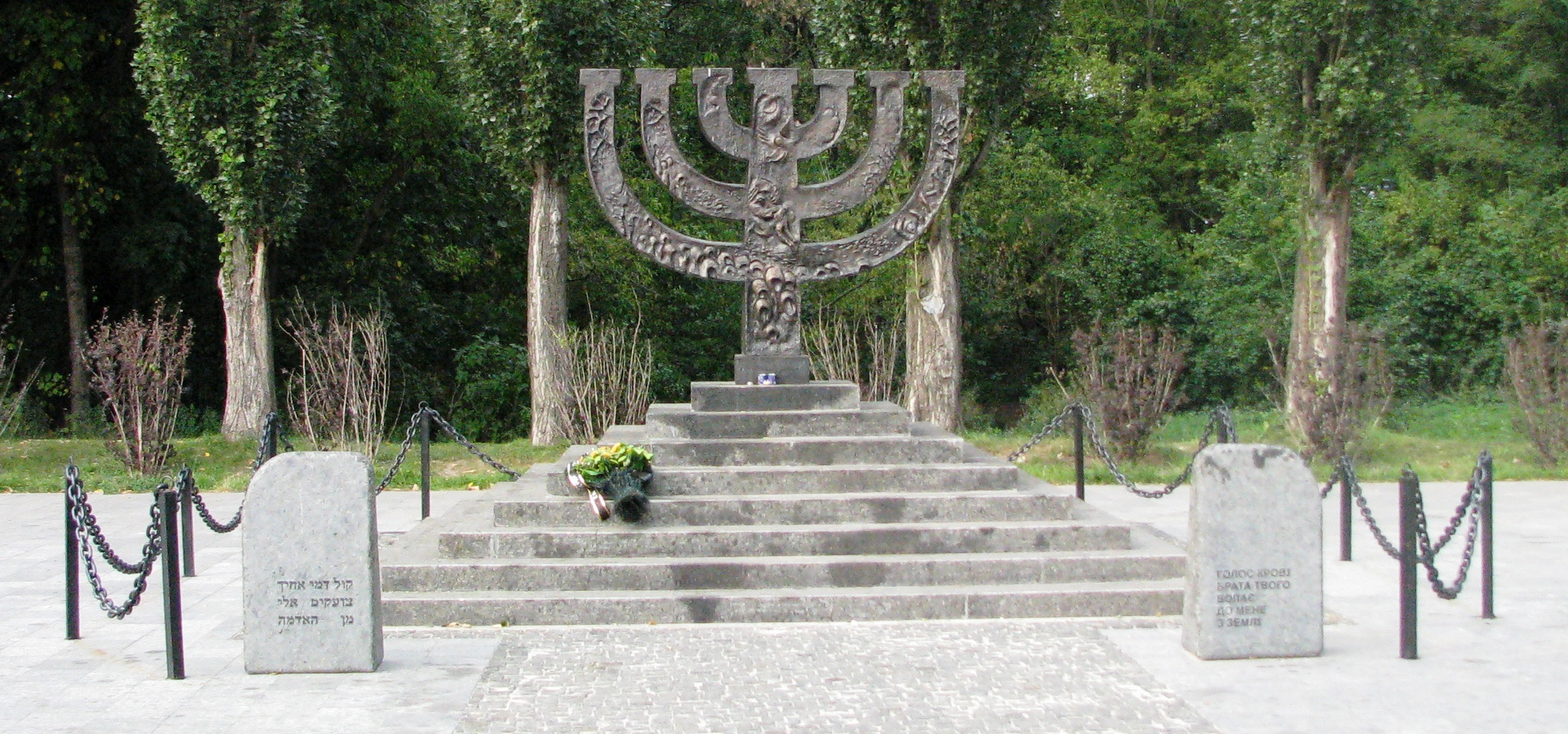
Monument "Menorah" to the murdered Jews (1991)

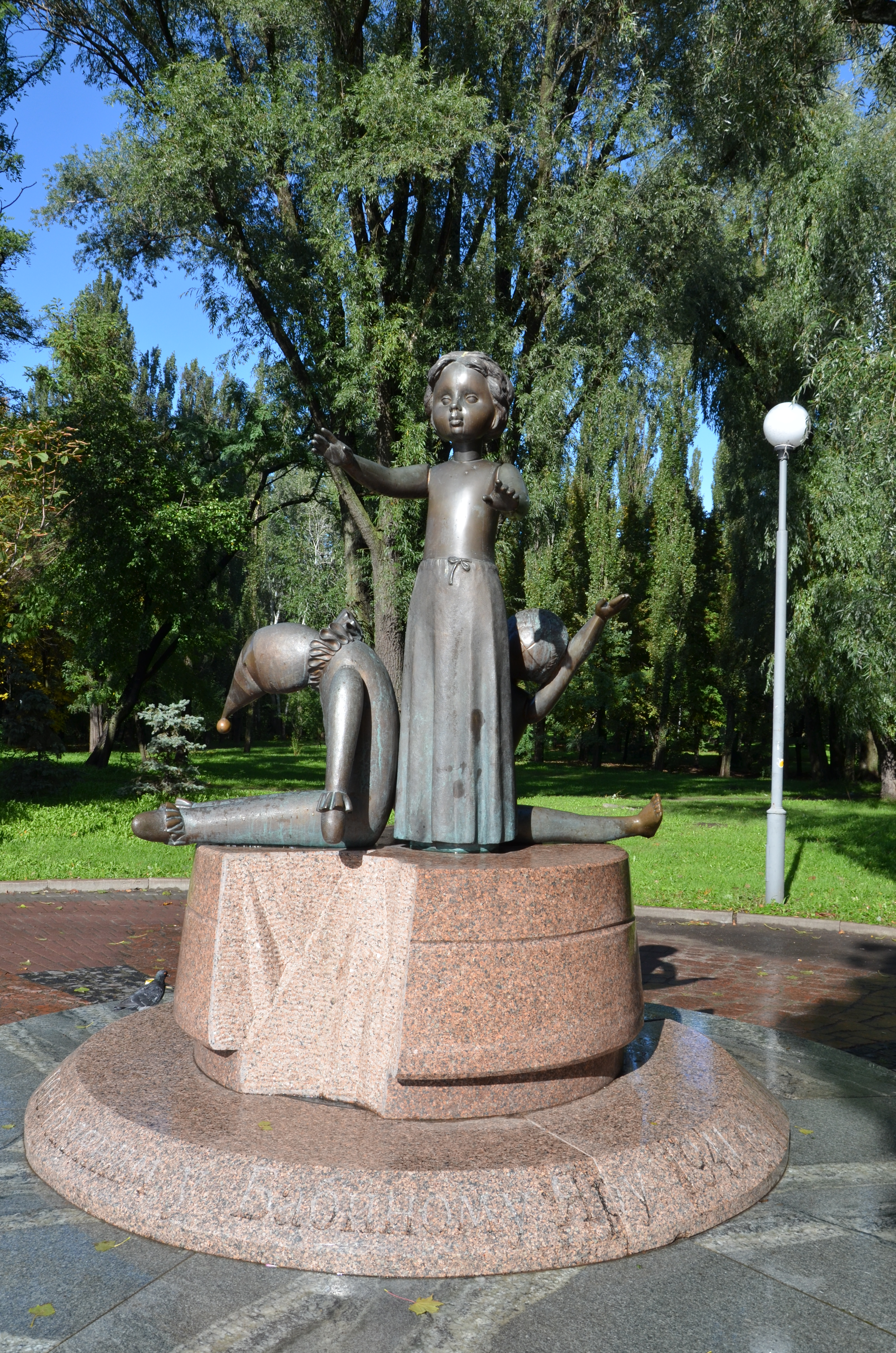
Monument to children murdered at Babi Yar (2001)

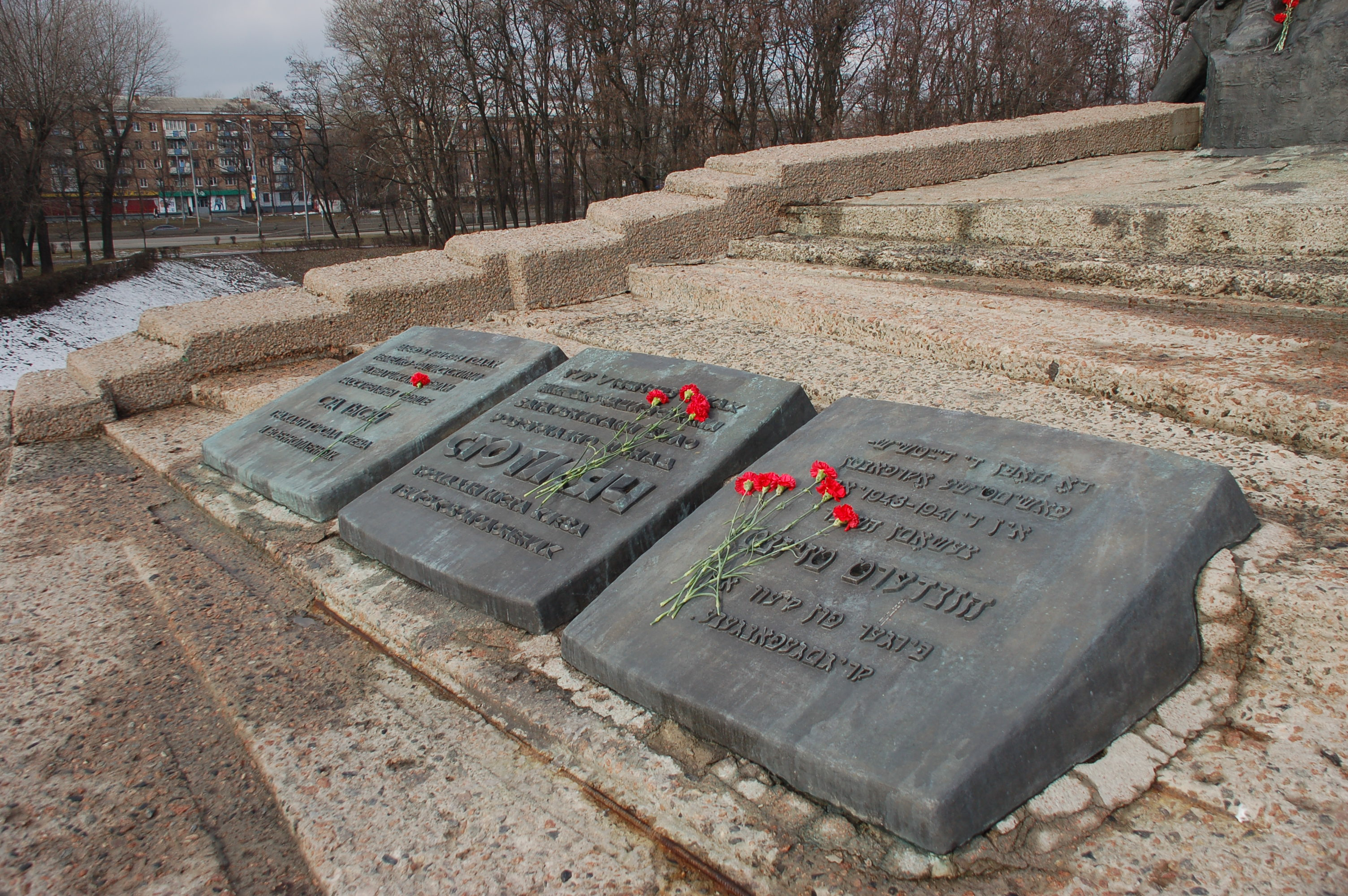
Multilingual memorial stones

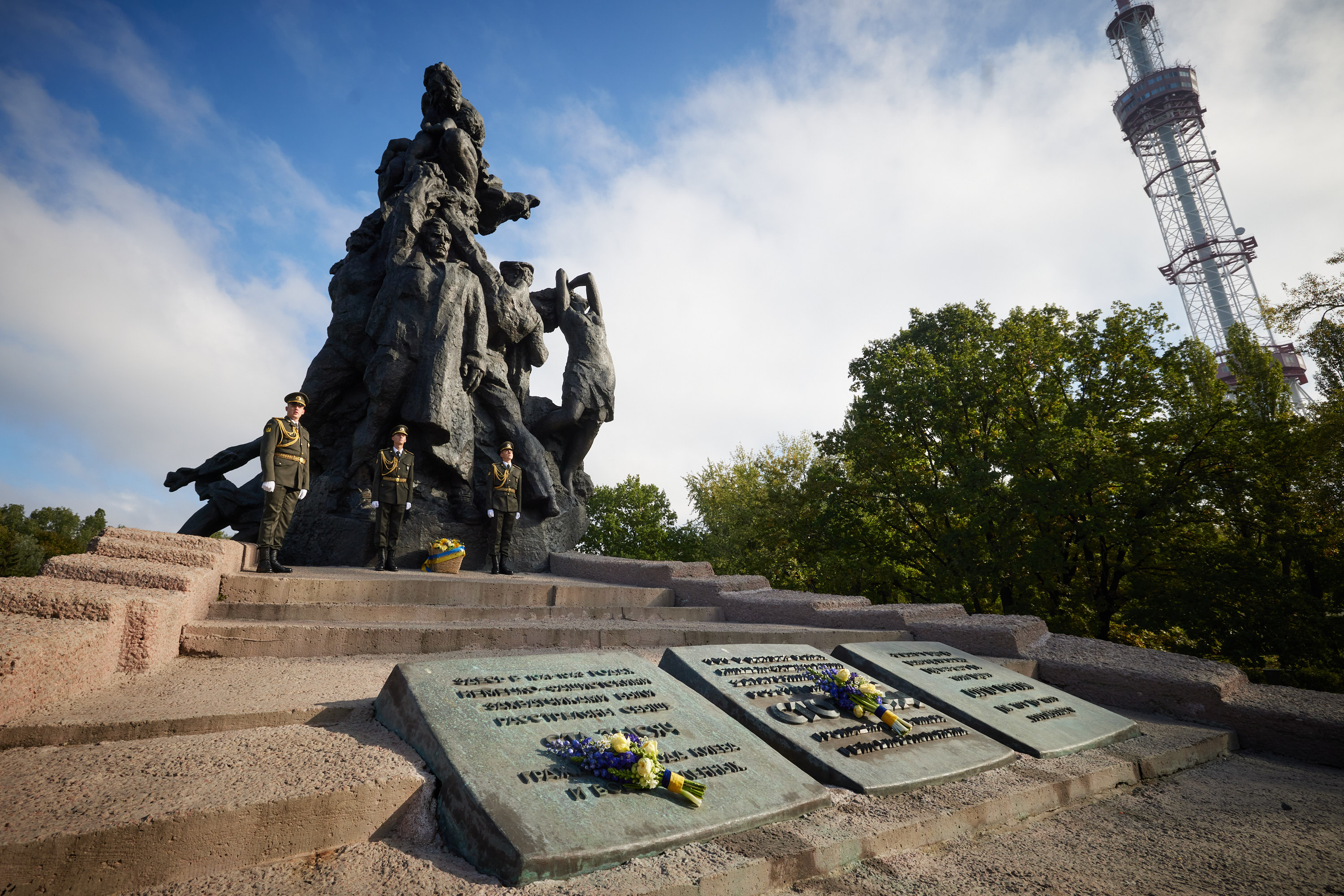
Statue right next to the Stones

== Other memorials ==
=== Brighton Beach, New York City ===
A small triangular section of land in Brighton Beach, Brooklyn, New York City (a neighborhood with a large Jewish and Russian population), was named Babi Yar Triangle in 1981, and renovated in 1988.

=== Denver, Colorado ===
Alan G. Gass, FAIA, President of the Babi Yar Park Foundation that originally developed the Park with the City and County of Denver, stated:

We built a public memorial park to the Babi Yar massacre in Denver, Colorado. It was dedicated in 1983, with an inscribed black granite entrance gateway, a "People Place" amphitheatre, a "Forest that Remembers" with a single fountain jet flowing from the middle of a flat, black granite monolith in the center of the grove, and a high-walled, narrow black bridge over a ravine, all at three points of a Magen David carved out of the native prairie grasses. It is owned and maintained by the City & County of Denver. The park is used by the recently arrived immigrants from Russia and the former Soviet Union as a place of memory during the year, with a remembrance ceremony in September each year.

=== Israel ===
There is a memorial to the victims of Babi Yar at the Nahalat Yitzhak Cemetery in Giv'atayim. The memorial was erected over bone fragments from Babi Yar that were re-interred at the cemetery. The bones were taken from Ukraine by three American college students in July 1971. The memorial was dedicated in 1972 by the Prime Minister of Israel, Golda Meir. There is an annual ceremony on Yom HaShoah, the Holocaust Day.

=== Sydney, Australia ===
A memorial to the victims of the Babi Yar Massacre was erected in the Sydney suburb of Bondi on 28 September 2014, which has a large Russian-speaking Jewish community. The monument was unveiled by the Mayor of Waverley and the Federal Member, Malcolm Turnbull. The erection of the monument was an initiative of the Executive Council of Australian Jewry and its Public Affairs Director, Alexander Ryvchin, who was born in the city of Kyiv, where the massacre took place. The English portion of the inscription on the monument reads:

"In memory of the Jews of Kiev, massacred at Babi Yar by the Nazis and their Ukrainian Collaborators, and in recognition of the suffering of Soviet Jewry."

== Literature, film, and music ==
The massacres at Babi Yar have been the subject of many artistic works. A number of films, documentaries, novels, poems, musical compositions, and television productions have commemorated the tragedy of murder and loss.

In his 1961 book, Star in Eclipse: Russian Jewry Revisited, Joseph Schechtman provided an account of the Babi Yar tragedy.

A poem was written by the Russian poet Yevgeny Yevtushenko; this in turn was set to music for full orchestra by world famous composer Dmitri Shostakovich in his Symphony No. 13 in 1962.

Anatoly Kuznetsov began writing a memoir of his wartime life when he was 14. Over the years he continued working on it, adding documents and eyewitness testimony. In 1966, Kuznetsov's Babi Yar: A Document in the Form of a Novel was published in censored form in the Soviet monthly literary magazine Yunost. He managed to smuggle 35 mm photographic film containing the uncensored manuscript with him when he defected from the USSR, and the book was published in the West in 1970.

D. M. Thomas's 1981 novel, The White Hotel uses the massacre's anonymity and violence as a counterpoint to the intimate and complex nature of the human psyche.

In 1985, a documentary film Babiy Yar: Lessons of History by Vitaly Korotich was made to mark the tragedy.

An oratorio was composed by the Ukrainian composer Yevhen Stankovych to the text of Dmytro Pavlychko (2006).

In 2021, Belarusian and Ukrainian filmmaker Sergei Loznitsa released the documentary, Babi Yar. Context. The film explores the prelude and aftermath of the massacre using footage shot by German and Soviet troops, and was reviewed favorably by The New York Times.

Dmitri Klebanov's Symphony No.1 In Memoriam to the Martyrs of Babi Yar (1945), a long-lost composition buried by Russian censorship for decades, was premiered posthumously in 1990. A subsequent critical edition of this symphony was performed in September 2024.
