= Dina Pronicheva =

Soviet Jewish actress (1911–1977)

- Діна Пронічева (Ukrainian); Дина Проничева (Russian)
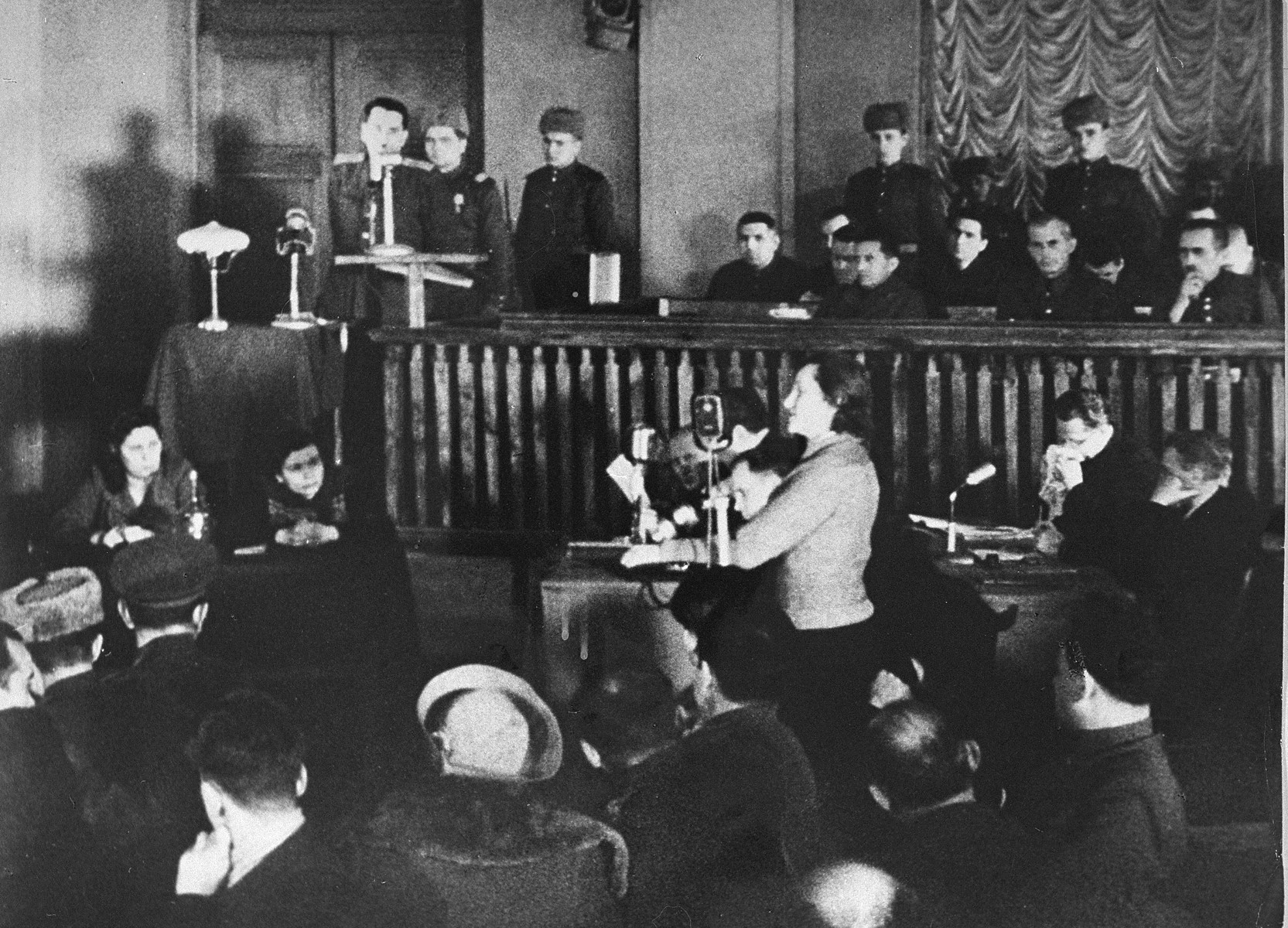
- Pronicheva on the witness stand at a Kiev war-crimes trial of fifteen members of the German police responsible for the occupied Kiev Oblast (24 January 1946)
- Born: Dina Mironovna Mstislavskaya; 7 January 1911; Chernigov, Russian Empire
- Died: 1977 (aged 65–66); Kiev, Ukrainian SSR, Soviet Union
- Military career
- Allegiance: Soviet Union
- Branch: Red Army
- Service years: 1941
- Unit: 37th Army
- Conflicts: World War II; Battle of Kiev (1941)

Dina Mironovna Pronicheva (Note: Russian: Дина Мироновна Проничева; Ukrainian: Діна Миронівна Пронічева, romanized: Dina Myronivna Pronicheva) (née Mstislavskya; (Note: Russian: Мстиславская; Ukrainian: Мстиславська, romanized: Mstyslavska) 7 January 1911 – 1977) was a Soviet Jewish actress at the Kiev Puppet Theatre, a 37th Army veteran under the communications branch, and a survivor of the 29–30 September 1941 Babi Yar massacre of Jews by Nazi German forces in Kiev.

== Biography ==
According to her written testimony to a 1946 trial of 15 accused Germans, Dina Pronicheva was born in Chernigov on 7 January 1911 and was of Jewish ethnicity. At the age of five, she relocated to Kiev and resided there until her death in 1977. She completed theatrical and military communications school, but did not finish any other higher education.

In 1941, she was working at a puppet theatre before joining the 37th Army of the Soviet Union to work in the communications branch. Due to family circumstances, she was transferred as a senior typist to a different department a short time after joining the communications branch. On 17 September 1941, she was told to stay behind enemy lines while the Army retreated.

== Experience under German occupation ==
=== Germans hunting for Jews after fires in Kiev ===
Pronicheva testified that after fires broke out in Kiev on 24 and 25 September, "hunting for Jews began. Germans were going from flat to flat at night, searching for Jews. I was living with my mother-in-law. She was a pious woman, and icons were hanging on the walls, and when Germans came she pointed to the icons to indicate that we were Russians, and they did not bother me." After the fires, she says that there were "rumours in the city that all the fires were occurring because of Jews who had remained here and had not been evacuated."

=== Experience arriving at Babi Yar ===
On 28 September 1941, an order signed by the commandant's office was given for Jews to take warm clothes and assemble at Degtiarev Street the following day at 8:00 a.m. or face execution. Historian Karel C. Berkhoff has noted that the order was unsigned. Dina Pronicheva's brothers remained with the Soviet forces and left for the front, and she left her children with her husband. At the Jewish cemetery location, Pronicheva saw Germans and Ukrainians guarding anti-tank obstructions, letting people in but not out. Germans took her relatives' belongings and separated them from her. She saw Germans with knuckledusters, truncheons, and heavy sticks beating people as they passed, including Pronicheva. According to Pronicheva's written testimony to Soviet historians, Pronicheva then looked at naked people walking toward execution on a path below her and saw her mother, who shouted at her to leave as she did not look like a Jew. According to a different version of her testimony, Pronicheva was with her mother and they embraced while her mother told her she was Russian and should go.

According to Pronicheva's testimony to Soviet historians, she then told a Ukrainian policeman that she was a Ukrainian, not a Jew, and was there by mistake. The policeman believed her due to the Russian patronymic on her trade union card and told her "Sit down and wait until evening. We'll let you go after we've shot all the Jews." According to a second written testimony, she showed her passport to a fat officer at a desk and told him she was Russian, but a policeman ran over and said "Don't believe her, she is a kike. We know her…", so the German officer told her to stand to one side and was then ordered to strip and walk onto a precipice. According to a different version of her testimony given under the name Dina Wasserman, she was registered on her passport as Russian. Another account states that she was registered as being of Jewish ethnicity. In her testimony to Soviet historians, Pronicheva said that she had thrown away her identity card before reaching the area and was told not to strip as it was late in the day and the Germans were tired. At the 1946 war crimes trial, Pronicheva testified that she threw away her passport, then showed a policeman her trade union card and employment record which did not list her Jewish nationality and told him she was Ukrainian, and she was then taken to one side and told not to strip as it was getting late.

=== Seeing hair turn white before her eyes ===
While waiting, Pronicheva testified that she saw people being undressed and beaten, their hair turning grey in a matter of minutes, and that she saw infants being separated from their mothers and thrown over a sand wall. Berkhoff states that many of the various versions of Pronicheva's story "state that the hair of some victims at Babi Yar turned white (or gray) before Pronicheva's eyes. While such phenomena have been mentioned in many other times and places, rapid whitening of scalp hair in extreme situations is impossible."

=== Execution ordered ===
Pronicheva testified that a German officer told the group waiting that they would all be shot so there were no witnesses, but they were not undressed. After walking onto a ledge where people were machine-gunned, she jumped off the cliff but felt no pain landing despite blood pouring from her face. A policeman or German then tripped over her, causing her to turn over. He then shone a torch on her face but did not see blood on her body. She was then picked up, beaten and thrown down, her chest and left hand were stood on, but played dead and the Germans walked away.

=== First escape and vivid hallucinations ===
Pronicheva then began to be buried alive with sand and started coughing, but moved the sand away with her good right hand which the German had not stepped on and moved away to a wall to hide behind the execution wall with a fourteen-year-old child she met named Motia, where at dawn she had witnessed Germans raping and murdering Jewish women and killing a child and an old woman. She then began vividly hallucinating, seeing her family in front of her in white robes. The account of her vivid hallucinations are not present in all versions of her testimony. After hallucinating and collapsing, she was then woken up by a boy. When the boy she was with walked ahead of her, he was shot by the Germans. In a different written testimony given under the name Dina Wasserman, she testified that the boy told her that he was eleven years old and named Fima Schneidermann.

=== Second escape and work for Nazi German occupation ===
In the written testimony, she states that after leaving the ravine she then found a cottage, where the son of the inhabitant brought a German officer to her, telling the German she was a Jew. She then carried out household work for several German officers until being placed in a vehicle with prisoners of war, which she jumped out of with another prisoner, Liuba. The residence they moved to was then raided by police, but Pronicheva hid under pillows and was not found.

Some time later Germans discovered them, but a companion of the German officers saved Pronicheva by claiming she worked for him and so moved them to a former army barracks where she worked for the Germans.

Pronicheva testified that she was later betrayed, but policemen and Gestapo who came for her were told that she had a heart condition and was possibly not a Jew as her papers were in order.

=== Third escape, hospitalization and imprisonment ===
Pronicheva testified that again on 23 February 1942 the Gestapo came to take her away, but she hid in the attic and they did not find her, then she ran into the forest. At the Darnytsia bridge she did not have to show a pass, as she used a letter about her needing to attend hospital. She then stayed with several people and spent nights in attics, cellars, lavatories and ruins until she was picked up in the street and taken to hospital.

After leaving hospital she went to Shuliavka, where she was identified and captured. She was then held in Lukyanivska Prison for twenty-eight days.

=== Fourth escape and theatrical work ===
Pronicheva testified at the trial that at Lukianivka prison a policeman named Mitia freed her, revealed himself to be a partisan, and left her near the Kalinin hospital. She then left for Bila Tserkva, where she stayed with an acquaintance of her husband who thought she was Russian. She then attempted to work as a German translator in Rokytne, but was thought to be a Jew and persecuted, so she left. She worked in the theater. In the summer of 1943, Pronicheva and the Shevchenko Theatre arrived in Ruzhyn, where 38 Jews lived in a ghetto and worked as tailors. She fed them secretly, but witnessed all but three being executed. She continued to work in the theater until the arrival of the Red Army on 28 December 1943.

=== Possible additional escape from gas chamber van ===
According to Pronicheva's nephew Mikhail, after escaping from Babi Yar, when Dina Pronicheva tried to visit her children at her mother-in-law's, "a cleaner in the block called the police, who took her son Vlodya hostage, threatening to kill him unless Dina handed herself in. When the police then called for the "soul destroyer" — a van equipped with a gas chamber — a friendly neighbour bribed a policeman to let Vlodya go."

== War crimes trial ==
Pronicheva was one of the very few survivors of the Babi Yar massacre. At least 28 other survivors are known.

Pronicheva was the only survivor of the massacre to testify at the 24 January 1946 Kiev-based war-crimes trial. Based on one of the at least 12 versions of her testimony and other evidence at a trial, 12 of the 15 accused German prisoners of war were executed, including Paul Scheer.

She later related her story to writer Anatoly Kuznetsov, who incorporated it into his novel Babi Yar, published in censored form in Yunost in 1966.

== Later life ==
Dina Pronicheva returned to Babi Yar every year after the war, and appears to have addressed a crowd there on the 25th anniversary of the massacre. In 1967, during their preparations for a trial of former members of Sonderkommando 4a, officials in the West German city of Darmstadt apparently asked the Prosecutor's Office in Kiev to question Pronicheva. The result of this deposition was a brief report in Russian, including the questions posed to her, dated February 9, 1967. This version incorrectly states that it is based on testimony given at a war crimes trial in 1945, rather than 1946.

== In fiction ==
Pronicheva's story is referenced in D.M. Thomas' 1981 novel The White Hotel. Thomas' 1988 memoir Memories and Hallucinations discusses the usage of Pronicheva's story.

== Historiographic Issues ==
Forming a coherent version of Dina Pronicheva's life is hindered by multiple contradictory verbal and written witness testimonies given about the Nazi occupation of Kiev.

Karel C. Berkhoff attributes several reasons for the contradictions in Dina's testimonies: official censorship, self-censorship, and undue editorial license. Berkhoff also states that "it looks as if she may have given in to pretrial pressure from the Kiev tribunal prosecution to say certain things." Pronicheva later stated in West Germany that she never wrote her testimony down herself.

Berkhoff recommends using the Soviet Union historian testimony version. The Soviet Union historian testimony version includes an account of Pronicheva's vivid hallucinations while at Babi Yar, consisting of who were not there. Most versions of her testimony are given under the name Dina Pronicheva, but another is given under the name Dina Wasserman or Vasserman.
