= Pronichev =

Pronichev (masculine, Russian: Проничев) or Pronicheva (feminine, Russian: Проничева) is a Russian surname. Notable people with the surname include:

- Dina Pronicheva (1911–1977), Soviet actress
- Mikhail Pronichev (born 1968), Russian soccer player, father of Maximilian
- Maximilian Pronichev (born 1997), German–born Russian soccer player, son of Mikhail
- Vladimir Pronichev (born 1953), Russian general
