= Jewish Cemetery Office Building =

Building in Kyiv, Ukraine

- Interactive map of the Jewish Cemetery Office Building area

General information
- Location: 44 Yuriia Illienka Street, Kyiv, Ukraine
- Coordinates: 50°28′21″N 30°27′25″E
- Completed: 1869
- Owner: Kyiv City Council

Design and construction
- Architect: Volodymyr Nikolaiev

Jewish Cemetery Office Building is the administrative building of the ruined Lukyanivske Jewish Cemetery, located at 44 Yuriia Illienka Street, Kyiv, Ukraine. It was constructed in 1869 by architect Volodymyr Nikolaiev.

In August–September 1943, it served as the barracks for the German occupation command 1005, which burned bodies.

In 1962, the building was converted into a dormitory for the ice hockey team Sokil. In the mid-2010s, the building passed to the Kyiv City Council of Trade Unions, which then handed it over to a private company. In 2016, due to legal violations, a court returned the building to the state. By a Cabinet of Ministers decision in December 2015, the building was handed over to National Historical and Memorial Reserve "Babyn Yar" to establish a Memorial Museum in memory of the tragedy's victims.

The building was restored with state funds and private sponsors. In 2021, the Prime Minister of Ukraine, Denis Shmyhal, instructed the State Property Fund of Ukraine to lease it to the private Russian project "Holocaust Memorial "Babyn Yar".
