= Babi Yar: A Document in the Form of a Novel =

1966 novel by Anatoly Kuznetsov

- Author: Anatoly Kuznetsov
- Original title: Бабий яр. Роман-документ
- Language: Russian
- Subject: Babi Yar
- Set in: Kyiv
- Publisher: Yunost
- Publication date: 1966; 60 years ago
- Publication place: Soviet Union
- English publication date: 1970; 56 years ago
- Media type: Print

Babi Yar: A Document in the Form of a Novel (Russian: Бабий яр. Роман-документ) is a documentary novel by Anatoly Kuznetsov, about the Nazi occupation of Kyiv and the massacres at Babi Yar. The two-day murder of 33,771 Jewish civilians on 29–30 September 1941, in the Kyiv ravine was one of the largest single mass killings of the Holocaust.

== Background ==
Kuznetsov began writing a memoir of his wartime life in a notebook when he was 14. Over the years, he continued working on it, adding documents and eyewitness testimonies.

The novel was first published in 1966 in what Kuznetsov would later describe as a censored, form in the Soviet monthly literary magazine Yunost, in the original Russian language. The magazine's copy editors cut the book down by^{[?]} a quarter of its original length and introduced additional politically correct material.

In 1969, Kuznetsov defected from the USSR to the UK and managed to smuggle 35-mm photographic film containing the unedited manuscript. The book was published in the West in 1970 under a pseudonym, A. Anatoli. In that edition, the edited Soviet version was put in regular type, the content cut by editors in heavier type, and newly added material was placed in brackets. In the foreword to the Russian-language edition by the Russian emigre publishing house Posev, Kuznetsov wrote:

In the summer of 1969 I escaped from the USSR with photographic films, including films containing the unabridged text of Babi Yar. I am publishing it as my first book free of all political censorship, and I am asking you to consider this edition of Babi Yar as the only authentic text. It contains the text published originally, everything that was expurgated by the censors, and what I wrote after the publication, including the final stylistic polish. Finally, this is what I wrote.

== Major characters ==
- Anatoly Kuznetsov (Tolya): The principal narrator and author of the book. Young and scrappy, at the outset of the novel, Anatoly is twelve years old, while at the end, he is fourteen years old—a crucial age, as the occupying German army deported boys fourteen and above to Germany. Encouraged by his mother, Anatoly keeps a journal detailing the atrocities of Babi Yar and the depopulation of Kyiv by the Nazis.
- Fyodor Vlasovich Semerik (grandfather): Born in the Russian Empire, he lived through the Russian Revolution and the formation of the Soviet Union. At the novel's beginning, Fyodor welcomes the German army as a saving force against the Bolsheviks—whom he blames for his poor economic circumstances. Once Fyodor realizes the Nazis are just as corrupt and brutal as the Bolsheviks, he welcomes the return of Soviet troops.
- Martha Yefimovna Semerik (grandmother): A charitable, religious, and superstitious woman. Even though Anatoly describes himself as an atheist, Martha's teachings greatly impact him—going as far as baptizing Anatoly against the will of his parents. Martha dies in the middle of the novel.
- Maria Fyodorovna Kuznetsova (mother): Becoming a successful primary schoolteacher after the revolution, Maria supports the family (Anatoly and his grandparents) solely on her income. Although she gets divorced from her husband, Vasili, she never applies for alimony and secretly hopes he will return. After the war, Maria lives at the same home, 28 Peter-Paul Square. Her salary is never raised, as she spent time under the German occupation. She becomes half-blind towards the end of her life and helps Anatoly with the book.
- Vasili Kuznetsov (father): A revolutionary and member of the Communist Party, Vasili meets Maria while working as a police officer in Kyiv, and his wedding engagement is accepted by Martha's father (Fyodor) after Vasili is elected to the city council. Fyodor dislikes Vasili for the rest of the couple's marriage for being a Bolshevik. Vasili is never seen again after getting a job at the Gorky plant.
- Titus the cat: Anatoly's pet cat. Titus survives the war even after attempts on his life are made by Fyodor and the German army. Titus was a companion to Anatoly in their homemade shelters.

== Structure ==
The 2023 paperback reissued edition of Babi Yar contains three different typefaces, distinguished by the author as follows:

- Ordinary type—material published in Yunost in 1966.
- "Heavier type"—material cut out by the censor at the time.
- Enclosed between square brackets [ ]—material added between 1967 and 1969.

== Content ==
The novel begins as follows:

Everything in this book is true. When I recounted episodes of this story to different people, they all said I had to write the book. The word 'document' in the subtitle of this novel means that I have provided only actual facts and documents without the slightest literary conjecture as to how things could or must have happened.

Kuznetsov describes his own experiences, supplementing them with documents and testimonies of survivors. The tragedy of Babi Yar is shown in the context of the German occupation of Kyiv, from its first days of September 1941 until November 1943. "It is also about the curious fact that a 14-year-old boy can show up anywhere and adults—German soldiers—don't especially care. By accident, then, he saw what others were not allowed to see. And by accident, he survived the occupation and lived to write about it." The chapter "How Many Times I Should Have Been Shot" lists twenty reasons the fascists should have shot him according to orders issued by the Nazi occupiers.

When he talks about his own family, the author does not shy away from criticizing the Soviet regime. Several intermissions directly address the future reader.

One of the most often-cited parts of the novel is the story of Dina Pronicheva, an actress of Kyiv Puppet Theatre. She was one of the people ordered to march to the ravine, forced to undress, and then shot. Badly wounded, she played dead in a pile of corpses and eventually managed to escape. One of the very few survivors of the massacre, she later told her horrifying story to Kuznetsov.

The novel concludes with a warning:

Let me emphasize again that I have not told about anything exceptional, but only about ordinary things that were part of a system; things that happened just yesterday, historically speaking, when people were exactly as they are today.

== See also ==
- Babi Yar memorials
