= Karel C. Berkhoff =

Dutch historian

Karel Cornelis Berkhoff (born 1965) is a senior researcher at NIOD Institute for War, Holocaust and Genocide Studies in Amsterdam.

== Education ==
Berkhoff studied history and Russian studies at the University of Amsterdam, Soviet Studies at Harvard University and graduated in 1998 as a historian at the University of Toronto, studying under Paul Robert Magocsi, Chair of Ukrainian Studies. He studies primarily World War II in Russia and Eastern Europe. He was an advisor to the ZDF documentary "Holocaust" (2000).

== Academic career ==
Berkhoff has been teaching at the University of Amsterdam since 2003, where he heads the master's program on the Holocaust and lectures in the bachelor's program on “Mass Murder and Society.”

Until 2010, Berkhoff worked as a researcher at the Center for Holocaust and Genocide Studies in Amsterdam and, after its merger with the Netherlands Institute for War Documentation to form the Institute for War, Holocaust, and Genocide Studies (NIOD), continued as a senior researcher.

On September 1 Berkhoff was appointed as professor at Leiden University with special focus in Ukrainian history and persecution.

== Research ==
Berkhoff focuses primarily on World War II in Russia and Eastern Europe and is considered one of the leading experts in international research on Ukraine during World War II.

Berkhoff became known for his study “Harvest of Despair” on the Reichskommissariat Ukraine, “which is likely to set standards for the history of the region between 1941 and 1944 for the foreseeable future.” Berkhoff's study differs from previous studies in that he uses numerous sources to present the history of the German occupation primarily from the perspective of the victims, providing a cross-section of everyday life for the rural and urban populations, as well as for Jews, Sinti and Roma, and Soviet prisoners of war. It deals with ethnic identity and political loyalties, religion and popular piety, deportation and forced migration, hopes for privatization of land and advancement in the police and auxiliary administration, as well as the subsequent disappointments and destruction of the country.

Since then, Karel Berkhoff has focused on the massacre at Babyn Yar, its (media) representation, and the preservation of its memory, and most recently led the development of an online bibliography on photography of the Holocaust.

== Babyn Yar Holocaust Memorial Center controversy ==
From February 2017 to January 2020, Berkhof was chief historian at the Babyn Yar Holocaust Memorial Center in Kyiv, which was to be financed by Mikhail Fridman and other Russian oligarchs with up to $100 million. Due to unagreed, authoritarian changes to the project, such as the introduction of a senior artistic director, Ilya Khrzhanovsky, and what Berkhoff considered an increasingly insensitive approach to history through “smart guiding” generated by facial recognition and personal questionnaires to create virtual realities "in which visitors find themselves in the roles of victims, collaborators, Nazis, and prisoners of war who were forced to burn corpses," Berkhoff distanced himself from the project and declined to renew his contract. Berkhoff also criticized a film project by Khrzhanovsky involving orphans who were apparently mentally disabled and, in at least one case, victims of sexual abuse. Russian neo-Nazis also participated in the film as amateur actors.

== Selected publications ==
=== Books ===
- Basic Historical Narrative of the Babi Yar Holocaust Memorial Center (PDF), Kiev: Charity Fund Babyn Yar Holocaust Memorial, 2018
- Motherland in Danger: Soviet Propaganda During World War II. Cambridge: Harvard University Press. 2012. doi:10.2307/j.ctt2jbqnd. ISBN 9780674049246. JSTOR j.ctt2jbqnd.
- Harvest of Despair: Life and Death in Ukraine Under Nazi Rule. Cambridge: Harvard University Press. 2004. doi:10.2307/j.ctv1p6hnvg. ISBN 978-0-674-02718-3. JSTOR j.ctv1p6hnvg.

=== Essays and Book Chapters ===
- "Soviet Footage from the 1940s and the Holocaust at Babyn Yar, Kyiv" (PDF), Documenting Nazi Crimes through Soviet Film, vol. 6, pp. 1–54, 2025, doi:10.25969/mediarep/23568
- With Mit Manfred Sapper: "Aussage in der Heimat der Täter", Osteuropa (in German), 71 (1–2): 41–46, 2021, JSTOR 27122495
- Berkhoff, Karel C. (2017). "The Dispersal and Oblivion of the Ashes and Bones of Babi Yar". In Lower, Wendy; Rossi, Lauren Faulkner (eds.). Lessons and Legacies XII: New Directions in Holocaust Research and Education. pp. 256–276. doi:10.2307/j.ctv47w5zs.16.
- "Hoe herdacht Kiev na 75 jaar Babi Jar?" [How did Kiev commemorate Babi Yar 75 years later?], RAAM, 2016-10-27
- "'The Corpses in the Ravine Were Women, Men, and Children': Written Testimonies from 1941 on the Babi Yar Massacre", Holocaust and Genocide Studies, vol. 29, no. 2, pp. 251–274, 2015, doi:10.1093/hgs/dcv030, hdl:20.500.11755/37b56e72-ec8c-4230-96b0-c343ef8c7efa
- Michael, David Fox; Holquist, Peter; Martin, A. M., eds. (2014). "Total Annihilation of the Jewish Population: The Holocaust in the Soviet Media, 1941-45". The Holocaust in the East: Local Perpetrators and Soviet Responses. Pittsburgh: University of Pittsburgh Press. pp. 83–117. ISBN 978-0-8229-6293-9.
- Babi Yar: Site of Mass Murder, Ravine of Oblivion (PDF), Washington: United States Holocaust Memorial Museum, 2012
- "The 'Russian' Prisoners of War in Nazi-Ruled Ukraine as Victims of Genocidal Massacre", Holocaust and Genocide Studies, vol. 15, no. 1, 2001, doi:10.1093/hgs/15.1.1
- with Carynnyk, Marco (1999). "The Organization of Ukrainian Nationalists and Its Attitude toward Germans and Jews: Iaroslav Stets'ko's 1941 Zhyttiepys". Harvard Ukrainian Studies. 23 (3–4): 149–184. JSTOR stable/41036794.
- "Ukraine under Nazi Rule (1941–1944): Sources and Finding Aids, Part I", Jahrbücher für Geschichte Osteuropas, vol. 45, no. 1, pp. 85–103, 1997, JSTOR 41049828

== Awards ==
- Fraenkel Prize in Contemporary History, 2001 from the Wiener Library for the book Harvest of Despair: Life and Death in Ukraine Under Nazi Rule.
