= Tatiana Markus =

Ukrainian Member of the anti-Nazi underground in Kiev

Tatiana Markus HOU OGS
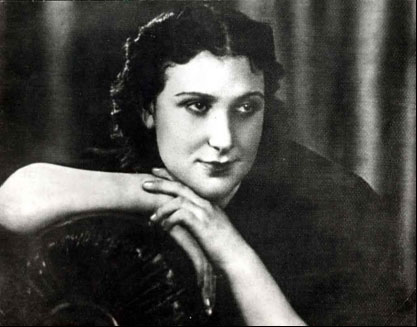
- Born: Tetyana Yosypivna Markus; 21 September 1921; Romny, Ukrainian Soviet Socialist Republic
- Died: 29 January 1943 (aged 21); Kiev, Reichskommissariat Ukraine
- Military career
- Awards: Hero of Ukraine

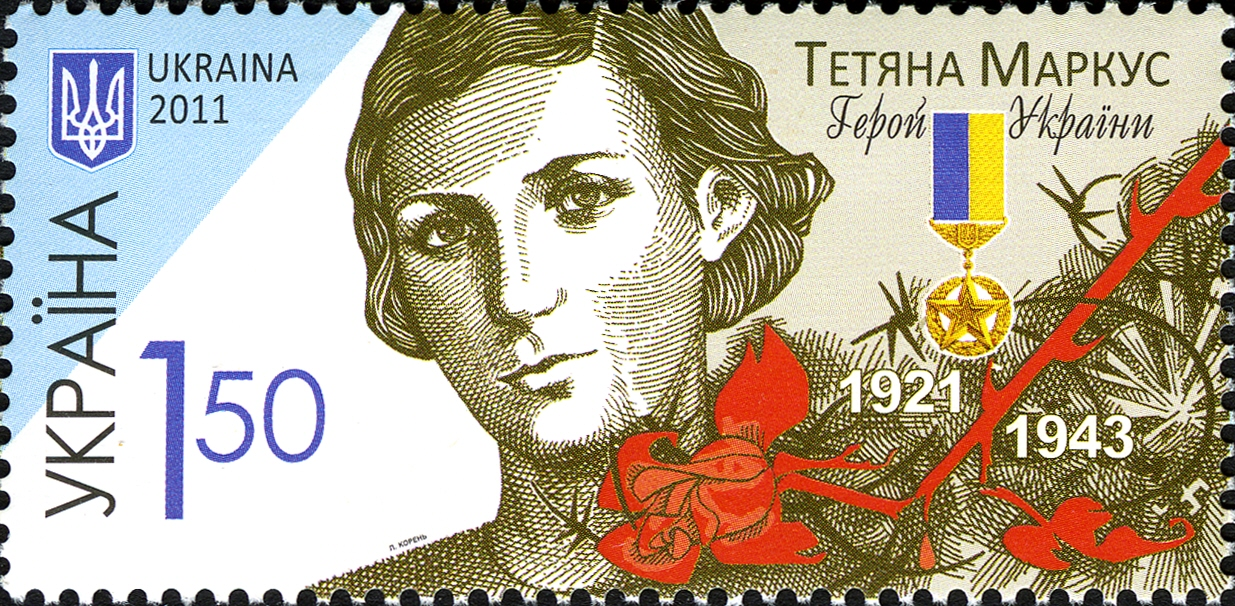
A 2011 Postage stamp honoring Markus

Tetyana Yosypivna Markus (also rendered as Tatiana, Ukrainian: Тетяна Йосипівна Маркус; 21 September 1921 – 29 January 1943) was a member of the anti-Nazi underground in Kiev.

== Biography ==
Markus was born in the Shtetl of Romny to a large Jewish family. A few years after her birth, her family moved to Kyiv. Markus graduated from the 9th form of school No. 44. In 1938, she worked as a secretary of the personnel department of the passenger service of the South-Western Railways. In the summer of 1940, she was sent to Chișinău, where she worked in a tramway trolleybus park.

After the seizure of Chișinău by the Romanians, Markus returned to Kyiv, which was occupied by Germany in 1941. Since then, she began actively participating in underground activities. She repeatedly took part in sabotage acts against the Nazis, in particular, throwing a grenade at a line of marching soldiers disguised as a bouquet of asters. With fake documents, Markus was registered in a private house under the name of Marcousisse: a legend was invented that she was the daughter of a Georgian prince executed by the Bolsheviks. Under this name, she was hired to work in an officer dining room. There, she successfully continued the sabotage activity: pouring poison into SS officer's food. Several officers died, and Markus left without suspicion. In addition, she personally shot a valuable Gestapo informant, and transmitted underground information about traitors who worked with the Gestapo. Many officers of the German army were attracted by her beauty and attempted to pursue her. One was a high-ranking official from Berlin, who was shot dead by Markus at his apartment after coming to fight partisans and underground fighters. During her tenure, she killed dozens of German soldiers and officers.

Once, she shot a Nazi officer and left a note: All of you, fascist reptiles are waiting for the same fate. Tetyana Markosidze. The leadership of the Soviet underground decided to withdraw Markus from the city to the partisans, but failed to do so. On 22 August 1942, she was captured by the Gestapo while attempting to cross the Dnieper. She was tortured by the Gestapo for five months, but she did not betray anyone. On 29 January 1943, Markus was shot.

== Legacy ==
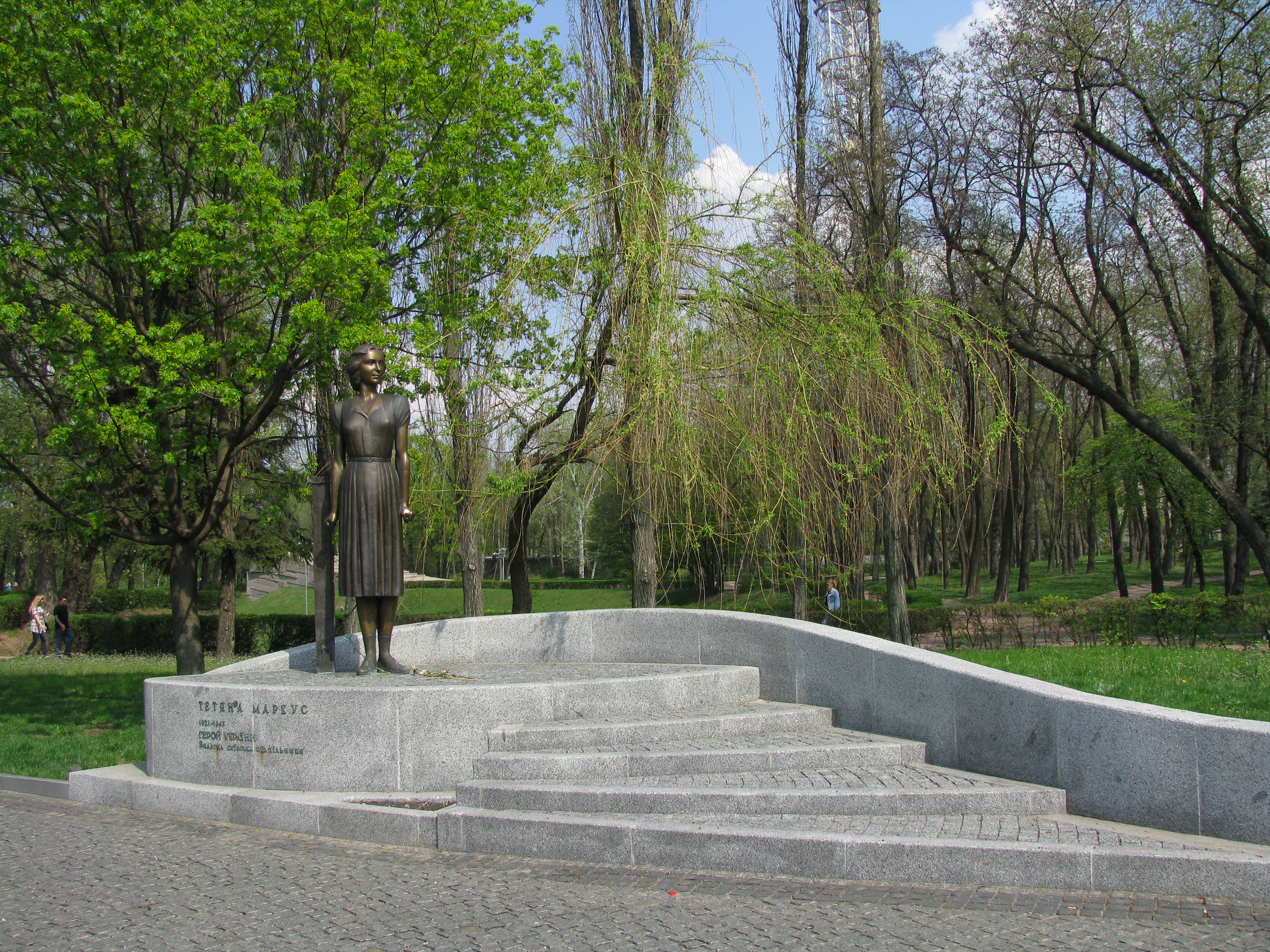
Monument to Tatiana Markus in Babi Yar

- A memorial plaque was dedicated to Markus at the Kyiv school No. 44. It was destroyed in the spring of 2016.
- She received the title of Hero of Ukraine with the Golden Star on 21 September 2006 – for personal courage and heroic self-sacrifice, invincibility of spirit in the fight against fascist invaders in the Great Patriotic War of 1941–1945.
- On 1 December 2009, a monument to Markus was opened in Babi Yar.
- In September 2011, a postage stamp dedicated to her was issued.
