= Otto Rasch =

German SS general and Holocaust perpetrator (1891–1948)

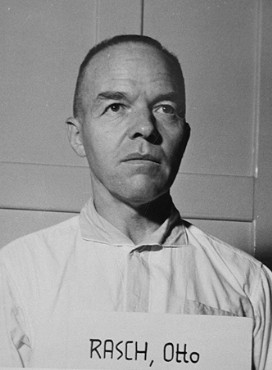
- Rasch in 1947
- Born: 7 December 1891; Friedrichsruh, German Empire
- Died: 1 November 1948 (aged 56); Wehrstedt, Lower Saxony, Allied-occupied Germany
- Known for: Babi Yar massacre
- Status: Deceased
- Motive: Nazism
- Criminal charges: Crimes against humanity War crimes Membership in a criminal organization
- Trial: Einsatzgruppen trial

Details
- Victims: 80,000+
- Span of crimes: 1939–1941
- Country: Poland and Ukraine
- Military career
- Allegiance: German Empire; Nazi Germany
- Branch: Imperial Royal Navy; Schutzstaffel
- Rank: SS-Brigadeführer
- Commands: Einsatzgruppe C
- Other work: Lawyer, Mayor

Emil Otto Rasch (7 December 1891 – 1 November 1948) was a high-ranking German Nazi official and Holocaust perpetrator, who commanded Einsatzgruppe C in northern and central Ukraine until October 1941. After World War II, Rasch was indicted for war crimes at the Einsatzgruppen trial, but the case was discontinued for medical reasons in February 1948. He died a few months later.

== Biography ==
Rasch was born in Friedrichsruh, Schleswig-Holstein. As a young man, Rasch fought in the First World War as a naval lieutenant. Following Germany's defeat, Rasch studied philosophy, law, political science, and received doctorates in law and political economy. With two university doctorates, Rasch was known as "Dr Dr Rasch", in accordance with the German academic tradition. In 1931, Rasch became a private sector lawyer, with a practice based in Dresden. In 1933, Rasch became mayor of Radeberg, followed shortly in 1935 by becoming lord mayor of Wittenberg.

After the war Rasch joined Deutschvölkischer Schutz- und Trutzbund in 1919 first and then Nazi Party on 1 October 1931 (membership № 620,976), he also joined the Sturmabteilung (SA) in 1933 and the Schutzstaffel (SS) on 10 March 1933 (membership № 107,100). Beginning in 1936, Rasch was employed full-time by the Sicherheitsdienst (SD). On 1 October 1937, as commissioner, Rasch assumed leadership of the State Police (Stapo) in Frankfurt am Main. In March 1938, again as commissioner, Rasch became director of security (based in Linz) for Upper Austria. In June 1938, Rasch was assigned various responsibilities within the RSHA and was appointed chief of the Sicherheitspolizei (Security Police, SiPo) and SD in Prague.

In November 1939, as inspector of the SiPo and SD, Rasch was transferred to Königsberg. Rasch suggested and oversaw the liquidation of Polish political prisoners (intelligentsia) who had been arrested by the Einsatzgruppen. Rasch himself checked which prisoners were to be killed. Though the killings took place in forests, in an attempt to cause panic, news of the executions was still known. With the approval of Reinhard Heydrich, Rasch organised and founded the Soldau concentration camp in the winter of 1939/40 as a Durchgangslager (Dulag), or transit camp, for deportations to the General Government, where Polish intelligentsia could be secretly executed.

== Einsatzgruppe ==
In June 1941, shortly before the invasion of the Soviet Union, Rasch took command of Einsatzgruppe C. In this capacity, he perpetrated extermination "actions" against Jews. Rasch, along with General Kurt Eberhard and Paul Blobel, organised the Babi Yar massacre, which saw the murder of over 33,000 Jews.

According to the post-war affidavit of Erwin Schulz, commander of Einsatzkommando 5 (part of Einsatzgruppe C):

SS-Brigadeführer Dr. Rasch distinguished himself by particular ruthlessness. He ordered the leaders also to participate personally in the shootings.

Rasch made sure that all Einsatzgruppen personnel, including the commanding officers, personally shot Jews, so that all members were culpable.

In August 1941, Adolf Hitler is alleged (in post-war interrogations of German prisoners) to have given a Führerbefehl (Leader's Order) for the extermination of entire populations in the Eastern territories. The commando leaders subordinate to Rasch met with him to discuss this order. Paul Blobel later testified that Rasch basically quoted what had been stated by Friedrich Jeckeln, that "the measures against the Jewish population had to be sharper and that he disapproved of the manner in which they had been carried out until now because it was too mild". In other words, the order was to shoot more Jews. Erwin Schulz confirmed this:

After about two weeks' stay in Berdichev the commando leaders were ordered to report to Zhitomir, where the staff of Dr. Rasch was quartered. Here Dr. Rasch informed us that Obergruppenführer Jeckeln had been there, and had reported that the Reichsführer-SS had ordered us to take strict measures against the Jews. It had been determined without doubt that the Russian side had ordered to have the SS members and Party members shot. As such measures were being taken on the Russian side, they would also have to be taken on our side. All suspected Jews were, therefore, to be shot. Consideration was to be given only when they were indispensable as workers. Women and children were to be shot also in order not to have any avengers remain. We were horrified, and raised objections, but they were met with a remark that an order which was given had to be obeyed.

Rasch was discharged from his position in October 1941, and at the beginning of 1942, he became the director of Continental Oil, Inc. in Berlin.

Rasch was indicted at the Einsatzgruppen trial at the end of September 1947. However, the case against Rasch was discontinued on 5 February 1948, since his physical and mental health were rapidly deteriorating from Parkinson's disease and associated dementia. Rasch was transferred back to an internment camp in the British zone. As his health further deteriorated, he was released in June 1948. He died of his illness at his home in Wehrstedt, Lower Saxony in November 1948.

== In fiction ==
- Rasch appears in Jonathan Littell's novel Les Bienveillantes. He files a record that the military should concentrate on fighting bolshevism which should not be identified with Jews. He also gives the order that Jews should be paraded in public before executions to 'destroy in eyes of Ukrainian peasants the myth of Jewish power'.

== Bibliography ==
- Browning, Christopher (2004). The Origins of the Final Solution : The Evolution of Nazi Jewish Policy, September 1939 – March 1942. With contributions by Jürgen Matthäus. University of Nebraska Press.
- Friedlander, Henry (1995). The Origins of Nazi Genocide: From Euthanasia to the Final Solution. The University of North Carolina Press. ISBN 0-8078-4675-9.
- Rhodes, Richard (2002). Masters of Death: The SS-Einsatzgruppen and the Invention of the Holocaust. New York: Alfred A. Knopf. ISBN 0-375-40900-9.
- Zenter, Christian and Bedürftig, Friedemann (1991). Encyclopedia of the Third Reich, New York: Macmillan, p. 754. ISBN 0-02-897502-2
