= Kurt Eberhard =

German general (1874–1947)

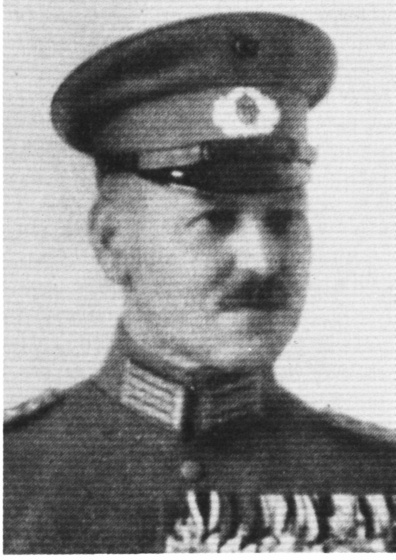
- Born: 12 September 1874; Rottweil, Kingdom of Württemberg, Germany
- Died: 8 September 1947 (aged 72); Stuttgart, Württemberg-Baden, Germany
- Cause of death: Suicide
- Military career
- Allegiance: Germany
- Branch: Army of Württemberg; Reichswehr; German Army; Schutzstaffel
- Rank: Generalmajor; SS-Brigadeführer
- Commands: 501st Field Artillery Regiment; 5th Artillery Regiment; Field Command 195; Commandant of Kiev
- Known for: Babi Yar massacre
- Conflicts: World War I; World War II; Babi Yar massacre
- Awards: Iron Cross, 1st and 2nd class War Merit Cross, 1st and 2nd class with swords

Kurt Eberhard (12 September 1874 – 8 September 1947) was a German professional military officer who served the German Empire, the Weimar Republic and Nazi Germany. He fought in both world wars and attained the rank of Generalmajor. He was also a member of the Nazi Party and the Schutzstaffel (SS), reaching the rank of SS-Brigadeführer.

After the German invasion of the Soviet Union, Eberhard served as the city commandant in German-occupied Soviet Kiev (today Kyiv, Ukraine). He was directly involved in the planning of the Babi Yar Massacre, one of the largest Nazi genocidal crimes, in which more than 33,000 Jews were murdered on 29–30 September 1941. Arrested by the Allies after the war, he took his own life while still in custody and never was tried for his offenses.

== Early life and education ==
Eberhard was born in Rottweil in the Kingdom of Württemberg. After completing his secondary education, he joined the Army of Württemberg on 3 August 1892. He was assigned to Field Artillery Regiment 13 "King Karl" (1st Württemberg) in Ulm as a Fahnenjunker (officer cadet). He advanced to Fahnrich on 18 March 1893, and was promoted to Leutnant and Oberleutnant on 25 November 1893 and 25 February 1902, respectively. From October 1902 to July 1905, Eberhard attended the Prussian War Academy in Berlin. He was next posted as an adjutant with the 27th Field Artillery Brigade (2nd Württemberg). Promoted to Hauptmann on 25 February 1908, he was assigned as a battery commander in the Field Artillery Regiment 65 (4th Württemberg) in Ludwigsburg on 25 July 1910. Eberhard remained in this position until his transfer on 1 October 1913 as an instructor at the Field Artillery School.

== Career ==
=== First World War ===
With the outbreak of the First World War, Eberhard returned to Field Artillery Regiment 65, again assuming the role of battery commander, and was deployed on the eastern front. After promotion to Major on 27 January 1915, he was given command of the regiment's Abteilung (department) II. Effective 10 April 1918, he was appointed commander of the 501st Field Artillery Regiment, with which he served on the western front. During the course of the war, he was highly decorated, being awarded the Iron Cross, 1st and 2nd class, the Knight's Cross of the Order of the Württemberg Crown with swords, the Knight's Cross of the Military Merit Order of Württemberg, the Hanseatic Cross of Hamburg, the Knight's Cross of the Albert Order, 1st class with swords, and the Military Merit Order of Bavaria, 4th class with swords and crown. After the end of the war, he led his regiment back home, where it was demobilized in Minden in December 1918 and disbanded in June 1919.

=== Reichswehr ===
Eberhard was accepted into the provisional Reichswehr of the Weimar Republic and initially was deployed as the commander of the 5th Artillery Regiment from 1 July 1919 to 1 October 1920. After the downsizing and formation of the 100,000 man army mandated by the Treaty of Versailles, he was reassigned as commander of the regiment's Abteilung II (Baden) in Ulm, and was promoted to Oberstleutnant on 18 October 1920. On 1 October 1922, Eberhard joined the staff of the artillery commander of Wehrkreis V, headquartered in Stuttgart. He was appointed commandant of Ulm on 1 April 1923, and promoted to Oberst on 1 November 1923. Eberhard retired from active service on 31 March 1925 with the rank of brevet Generalmajor.

=== Nazi Party and SS ===
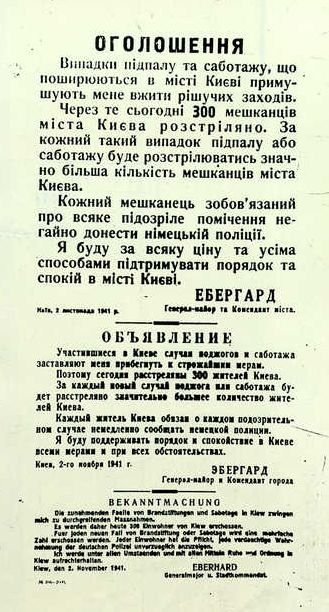
Announcement of hostage shootings in Kiev, issued by city commandant Eberhard on 2 November 1941

On 1 May 1937, Eberhard joined the Nazi Party (membership number 5,645,459). In addition, he became a member of the Schutzstaffel (SS) on 20 April 1939 (membership number 323,045) with the rank of SS-Standartenführer and, on 9 November 1940, he was promoted to SS-Oberführer. He attained his highest SS rank on 9 November 1942, when he was made an SS-Brigadeführer.

=== Second World War ===
Shortly before the outbreak of the Second World War, Eberhard was recalled to active duty in the German Army in August 1939. With the start of the Battle of France on 10 May 1940, Eberhard was assigned to the staff of Field Command 550. He was assigned to organize the artillery on the right bank of the Rhine in Wehrkreis V in what became known as Artillery Staff Eberhard. This unit was disbanded on 7 July 1940, after the Armistice of Compiègne.

From 13 May 1941, to 20 June 1942, Eberhard served as commander of Field Command 195 and, after the German invasion of the Soviet Union, he was named commandant of the occupied city of Kiev. On 26 September 1941, he participated in a meeting in his office with the commander of Einsatzgruppe C, SS-Brigadeführer Otto Rasch, and the commander of SS-Sonderkommando 4a, SS-Standartenführer Paul Blobel, in which the Babi Yar massacre was planned. Eberhard reported to Berlin on 28 September 1941: "Wehrmacht welcomes measures and requests radical action". Eberhard cooperated by providing the SS with a propaganda company to persuade the residents that they were being transported for resettlement. On 29–30 September 1941, SS and police units shot 33,771 Jews from Kiev at the Babi Yar ravine located outside the city. Eberhard also participated in the registration of the Jews of Kiev, ordered the execution of hostages, and opened the city to Sonderkommando 4a.

Eberhard was transferred to the Führerreserve in July 1942 and left active service at the end of November 1942, having earned the War Merit Cross, 1st and 2nd class with swords. He was taken into custody by American forces in November 1945 and, on 8 September 1947, took his own life in Stuttgart while still being held as a prisoner.

== Sources ==
- Klee, Ernst (2007). Das Personenlexikon zum Dritten Reich. Wer war was vor und nach 1945. Frankfurt-am-Main: Fischer-Taschenbuch-Verlag. ISBN 978-3-596-16048-8.
- Schiffer Publishing Ltd., ed. (2000). SS Officers List: SS-Standartenführer to SS-Oberstgruppenführer (As of 30 January 1942). Schiffer Military History Publishing. ISBN 0-7643-1061-5.
- Webb, James Jack (2024). Generals and Admirals of the Third Reich: For Country or Fuehrer. Vol. 1: A–G. Havertown, PA: Casemate Publishers. ISBN 978-1-952-71512-9.
