= Babyn Yar Holocaust Memorial Center =

Museum in Kyiv, Ukraine

- Меморіальний центр Голокосту «Бабин Яр»
- Established: 2016
- Location: Kyiv
- Coordinates: 50.4713°N 30.448°E
- Type: Memorial to the victims of the Holocaust.
- Website: babynyar.org

The Babyn Yar Holocaust Memorial Center (Ukrainian: Меморіальний центр Голокосту «Бабин Яр», romanized: Memorialnyy tsentr Holokostu "Babyn Yar"), officially the Foundation and Babyn Yar Holocaust Memorial Center, is an educational institution that documents, explains and commemorates the Babyn Yar shootings of September 1941 and aims to broaden and sustain the memory of The Holocaust in Eastern Europe, taking into account geopolitical changes during the 20th century. On September 29, 2016, President of Ukraine Petro Poroshenko, together with public figures and philanthropists, initiated the creation of the first Babyn Yar Holocaust Memorial Center. The Memorial Center had planned to be opened in Kyiv, Ukraine, in 2025/26, but because of the war, it is unclear when the physical museum will open.

== Babi Yar ==
On September 29–30, 1941, in Babyn Yar (also known by the Russian transliteration Babi Yar), a ravine in Kyiv, the Nazis slaughtered more Jews in two days than in any other single German massacre, killing 33,771 Jews. In total, from September 29, 1941, until October 1943, the Nazi occupation authorities killed nearly 100,000 people in and near Babyn Yar.

== History ==
On September 29, 2016, President of Ukraine Petro Poroshenko, together with public figures and philanthropists, initiated the creation of the first Babyn Yar Holocaust Memorial Center. In his opinion, the creation of the Holocaust Memorial in Babyn Yar can become a symbol of the unity of the nation and mother of greatness for the whole world. Poroshenko himself and the Mayor of Kyiv, Vitali Klitschko, were present at the ceremony.

On March 19, 2017, the Supervisory Board of the Memorial was founded. The Supervisory Board is headed by the chairman of the Jewish Agency for Israel Natan Sharansky and consists of philanthropists German Khan, Mikhail Fridman, Victor Pinchuk, and Pavel Fuks, the chief rabbi of Kyiv and Ukraine Yakov Dov Bleich, artist Svyatoslav Vakarchuk, world heavyweight champion Volodymyr Klitschko, the former Director-General of UNESCO Irina Bokova, former President of Poland Alexander Kwasniewski, former Minister of Foreign Affairs of Germany Joschka Fischer.

On October 19, 2017, the leadership of the Babyn Yar Holocaust Memorial Center met with the Prime Minister of Ukraine Volodymyr Groysman. The Prime Minister expressed support for the project to build a memorial complex in Kyiv to commemorate the victims of Babyn Yar, and noted the importance of preserving historical memory in order to prevent the recurrence of past mistakes in the future.

On 6 October 2021, following the 80th anniversary of the massacre, the Memorial Center released the first 161 names of Nazi soldiers who were perpetrators of the crimes at Babyn Yar. It described the release of names as the first installment of ongoing research into those who committed the murder of 33,771 Ukrainian Jews on September 29 and 30, 1941.

From February 2017 to January 2020, the dutch historian and holocaust researcher Karel C. Berkhoff was the project's chief historian. Due to unagreed, authoritarian changes to the project, such as the introduction of a senior artistic director, Ilya Khrzhanovsky, and what Berkhoff considered an increasingly insensitive approach to history through “smart guiding” generated by facial recognition and personal questionnaires to create virtual realities "in which visitors find themselves in the roles of victims, collaborators, Nazis, and prisoners of war who were forced to burn corpses," Berkhoff distanced himself from the project and declined to renew his contract. Berkhoff also criticized a film project by Khrzhanovsky involving orphans who were apparently mentally disabled and at least one case of sexual abuse. Russian neo-Nazis also participated in the film as amateur actors. On April 27, 2020, curator Dieter Bogner joined in, followed by eight others in early May, who criticized the “psychological experiments” in an open letter.

On 1 March 2022, the site of Babyn Yar was hit by Russian missiles and shells during the (part of the 2022 Russian invasion of Ukraine) battle of Kyiv, killing at least five people. Ukrainian president Volodymyr Zelenskyy and Andriy Yermak, chairman of the Ukrainian Presidential Office, condemned the missile attack, as did Israeli leaders including Foreign Minister Yair Lapid and Diaspora Affairs Minister Nachman Shai. Ynet journalist Ron Ben Yishai reported that Babyn Yar remained unscathed after the Russian attack.

In a February 2023 interview, art director of the Babyn Yar Memorial Foundation Ilya Khrzhanovsky mentioned that German Khan and Mikhail Fridman (at the time both under sanctions due to their alleged role in the 2022 Russian invasion) had withdrawn from the project and that Ronald Lauder had recently become a major donor. Khrzhanovsky himself resigned from the project on 5 September 2023.

== See also ==
- Babi Yar memorials
