= Babi Yar =

Ravine and massacre site in Kyiv, Ukraine

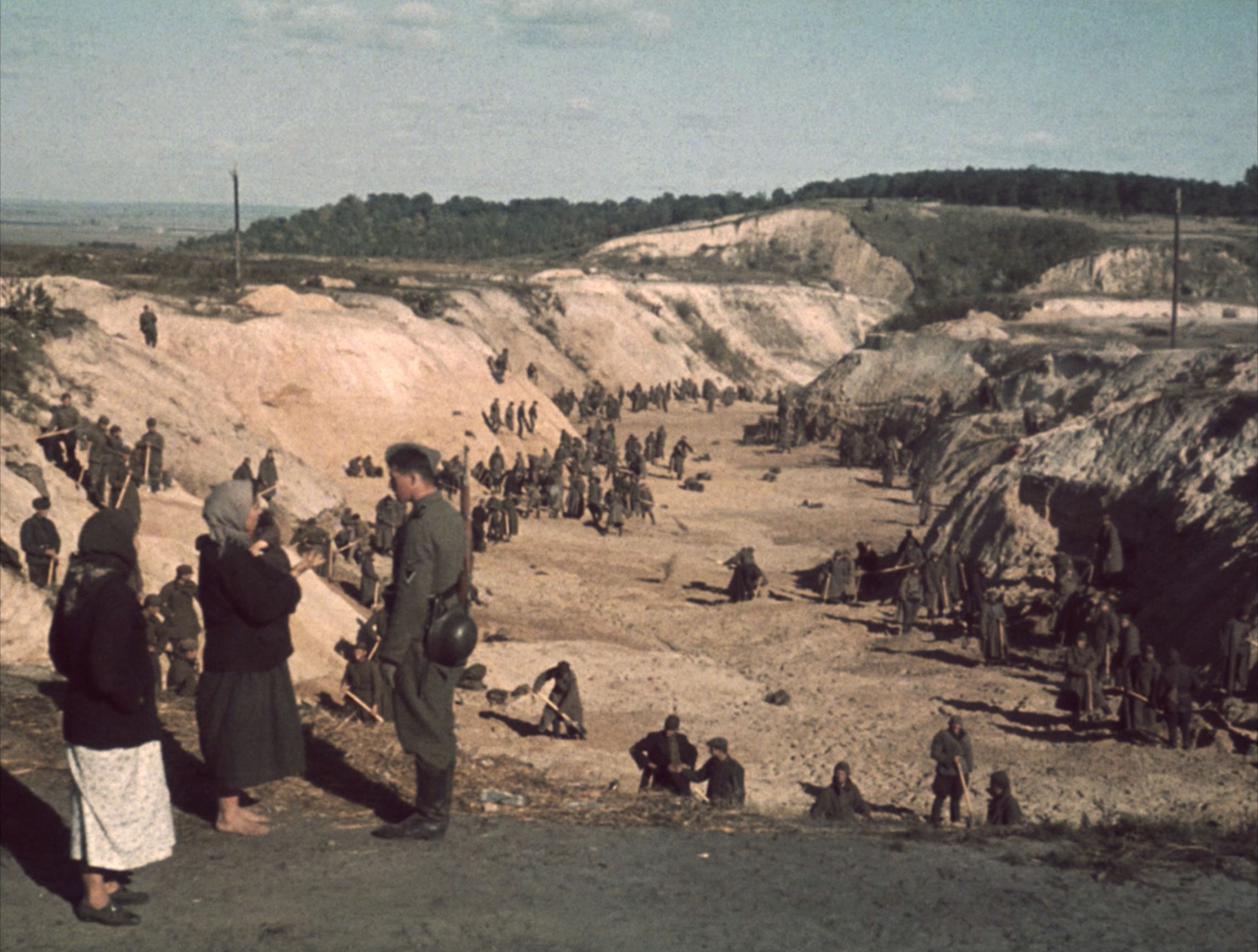
- Soviet POWs being used by Germany to cover the mass grave after the massacre, 1 October 1941
- Also known as: Babyn Yar
- Location: Kiev, Ukrainian SSR, Soviet Union; 50°28′17″N 30°26′56″E
- Date: 29–30 September 1941
- Incident type: Genocide and mass murder
- Perpetrators: Friedrich Jeckeln, Otto Rasch, Paul Blobel, Kurt Eberhard, and others
- Organizations: Einsatzgruppen, Order Police battalions, Ukrainian Auxiliary Police, Sonderkommando 4a, Wehrmacht
- Camp: Syrets concentration camp
- Victims: 33,771 Jews in initial two-day massacre (29 survived); 100,000–150,000 Jews, Soviet prisoners of war and Romani on later dates
- Survivors: Dina Pronicheva
- Memorials: On site and elsewhere
- Notes: Possibly the largest two-day massacre during the Holocaust. Syrets concentration camp was also located in the area. Massacres occurred at Babi Yar from 29 September 1941 to 6 November 1943, when Soviet forces liberated Kyiv.

Immovable Monument of National Significance of Ukraine
- Official name: Комплекс пам'яток на місці масового знищення мирного населення та військовополонених в урочищі Бабин Яр під час гітлерівської окупації (Complex of monuments on the site of mass extermination of civilians and prisoners of war in the Babyn Yar tract during the Nazi occupation)
- Type: History
- Reference no.: 260033-Н

Babi Yar (Note: The English-language spelling of key locations in this article has been in flux in recent years circa 2026; this article uses the traditional English spelling of the specific site [Babi Yar versus the local Babyn Yar], but now favors the local Kyiv for the spelling of the nearby major city [versus the previously-English-favored Kiev].) (Russian: Бабий Яр) or Babyn Yar (Ukrainian: Бабин Яр) is a ravine in the Ukrainian capital Kyiv and a site of massacres carried out by Nazi Germany's forces during its campaign against the Soviet Union in World War II. The first and best documented of the massacres took place on 29–30 September 1941, in which some 33,771 Jews were murdered. Other victims of massacres at the site included Soviet prisoners of war, communists and Romanies. It is estimated that a total of between 100,000 and 150,000 people were murdered at Babi Yar during the German occupation.

The decision to murder all the Jews in Kyiv was made by the German military governor Generalmajor Kurt Eberhard, the Police Commander for Army Group South, SS-Obergruppenführer Friedrich Jeckeln, and the Einsatzgruppe C Commander Otto Rasch. Sonderkommando 4a as the sub-unit of Einsatzgruppe C, along with the aid of the SD and Order Police battalions with the Ukrainian Auxiliary Police backed by the Wehrmacht, carried out the orders. Sonderkommando 4a and the 45th Battalion of the German Order Police conducted the shootings. Servicemen of the 303rd Battalion of the German Order Police at this time guarded the outer perimeter of the execution site.

The massacre was the largest mass-murder by the Nazi regime during the campaign against the Soviet Union, and it has been called "the largest single massacre in the history of the Holocaust" to that particular date. It is only surpassed overall by the later October 1941 Odessa massacre of more than 50,000 Jews (committed by German and Romanian troops), and by Aktion Erntefest of November 1943 in occupied Poland with 42,000–43,000 victims.

== Historical background ==
The Babi Yar (Babyn Yar) ravine was first mentioned in historical accounts in 1401, in connection to the sale of it by baba (an old woman) who was also the cantiniere in the Dominican Monastery. The word yar is Turkic in origin and means "gully" or "ravine". Over several centuries, the site was used for various purposes, including military camps and at least two cemeteries, including an Orthodox Christian cemetery and a Jewish cemetery. The latter was officially closed in 1937.

== Massacres of September 1941 ==
Axis forces, mainly German, occupied Kyiv on 19 September 1941. Between 20 and 28 September, explosives planted by the Soviet secret police (the NKVD) caused extensive damage in the city, and on 24 September an explosion rocked Rear Headquarters Army Group South. Two days later, on 26 September, Maj. Gen. Kurt Eberhard, the military governor, and SS-Obergruppenführer Friedrich Jeckeln, the SS and Police Leader, met at Rear Headquarters Army Group South. There, they decided to exterminate the Jews of Kyiv, claiming that it was retaliation for the explosions. Also present were SS-Standartenführer Paul Blobel, commander of Sonderkommando 4a of Einsatzgruppe C, and his superior, SS-Brigadeführer Dr. Otto Rasch, commander of Einsatzgruppe C. The mass murder was to be carried out by units under the command of Rasch and Blobel, who were ultimately responsible for many atrocities in Soviet Ukraine during the summer and autumn of 1941.

The implementation of the order was entrusted to Sonderkommando 4a of Einsatzgruppe C commanded by Blobel, under the general command of Friedrich Jeckeln. This unit consisted of Sicherheitsdienst (SD) and Sicherheitspolizei (SiPo), the third company of the Special Duties Waffen-SS battalion, and a platoon of the 9th Police Battalion. Sonderkommando 4a of Einsatzgruppe C and Police Battalion 45, commanded by Major Besser, conducted the massacre, supported by members of a Waffen-SS battalion. Contrary to the "myth of the clean Wehrmacht", the Sixth Army under the command of Field Marshal Walter von Reichenau worked together with the SS and SD to plan and execute the mass-murder of the Jews of Kyiv.

On 26 September 1941, the following order was posted:

All Yids (Note: The order was posted in German, Ukrainian, and in the largest letters, Russian. In only the Russian version is the defamatory word "zhid" (жид) used for Jews. The respectful Russian word is "yevrey" (еврей). The word "zhyd" (жид) in Ukrainian was at the time not defamatory at all, as noted by Nikita Khrushchev in his memoirs: "I remember that once we invited Ukrainians, Jews and Poles ... to a meeting at the Lvov [Lviv] opera house. It struck me as very strange to hear the Jewish speakers at the meeting refer to themselves as 'yids.' 'We yids hereby declare ourselves in favour of such-and-such.' Out in the lobby after the meeting I stopped some of these men and demanded, 'How dare you use the word "yid?" Don't you know it's a very offensive term, an insult to the Jewish nation?' 'Here in the Western Ukraine it's just the opposite,' they explained. 'We call ourselves yids' ... Apparently what they said was true. If you go back to Ukrainian literature ... you'll see that 'yid' isn't used derisively or insultingly.") of the city of Kiev and its vicinity must appear on Monday, 29 September, by 8 o'clock in the morning at the corner of Mel'nikova and Dokterivskaya streets (near the Viis'kove cemetery). Bring documents, money and valuables, and also warm clothing, linen, etc.

Any Yids who do not follow this order and are found elsewhere will be shot. Any civilians who enter the dwellings left by Yids and appropriate the things in them will be shot.

— Order posted in Kyiv in Russian, Ukrainian, and German on or around 26 September 1941

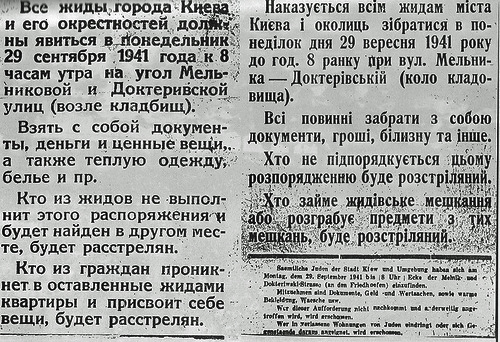
Notice dated 28 September 1941 in Russian, Ukrainian with German translation ordering all Kyivan Jews to assemble for supposed resettlement

On 29 and 30 September 1941, the Nazis and their collaborators murdered approximately 33,771 Jewish civilians at Babi Yar. The order to murder the Jews of Kyiv was given to Sonderkommando 4a of Einsatzgruppe C, consisting of SD and SiPo men, the third company of the Special Duties Waffen-SS battalion, and a platoon of the No. 9 police battalion. These units were reinforced by police battalions Nos. 45 and 303, by units of the Ukrainian auxiliary police, and supported by local collaborators. Sonderkommando 4a and the 45th Battalion of the German Order Police conducted the shootings. Servicemen of the 303rd Battalion of the German Order Police at this time guarded the outer perimeter of the execution site.

The commander of the Einsatzkommando reported two days later:

The difficulties resulting from such a large scale action—in particular concerning the seizure—were overcome in Kiev by requesting the Jewish population through wall posters to move. Although only a participation of approximately 5,000 to 6,000 Jews had been expected at first, more than 30,000 Jews arrived who, until the very moment of their execution, still believed in their resettlement, thanks to an extremely clever organization.

According to the testimony of a truck driver named Hofer, victims were ordered to undress and were beaten if they resisted:

I watched what happened when the Jews—men, women and children—arrived. The Ukrainians (Note: While the witness referred to "[t]he Ukrainians" there has only been one documented Ukrainian speaker at Babi Yar, and that was Second Lieutenant Joseph Muller, an ethnic German from Galicia. Thus, it is more accurate to describe these people as "Ukrainian speakers". A German policeman who guarded Babi Yar testified in 1965 that "the Jews were guarded by Wehrmacht units and by a Hamburg Police Battalion, which, as far as I can remember, carried the number 303.") led them past a number of different places where one after the other they had to give up their luggage, then their coats, shoes and over-garments and also underwear. They also had to leave their valuables in a designated place. There was a special pile for each article of clothing. It all happened very quickly and anyone who hesitated was kicked or pushed by the Ukrainians to keep them moving.

— Michael Berenbaum: "Statement of Truck-Driver Hofer describing the murder of Jews at Babi Yar"

The crowd was large enough that most of the victims could not have known what was happening until it was too late; by the time they heard the machine gun fire, there was no chance to escape. All were driven down a corridor of soldiers, in groups of ten, and then shot. A truck driver described the scene.

Once undressed, they were led into the ravine which was about 150 metres long and 30 metres wide and a good 15 metres deep ... When they reached the bottom of the ravine they were seized by members of the Schutzpolizei and made to lie down on top of Jews who had already been shot ... The corpses were literally in layers. A police marksman came along and shot each Jew in the neck with a submachine gun ... I saw these marksmen stand on layers of corpses and shoot one after the other ... The marksman would walk across the bodies of the executed Jews to the next Jew, who had meanwhile lain down, and shoot him.

In the evening, the Germans undermined the wall of the ravine and buried the people under the thick layers of earth. According to the Einsatzgruppe's Operational Situation Report, 33,771 Jews from Kyiv and its suburbs were systematically shot dead by machine-gun fire at Babi Yar on 29 and 30 September 1941. The money, valuables, underwear, and clothing of the murdered were turned over to the local ethnic Germans and to the Nazi administration of the city. Wounded victims were buried alive in the ravine along with the rest of the bodies.

== Further massacres ==
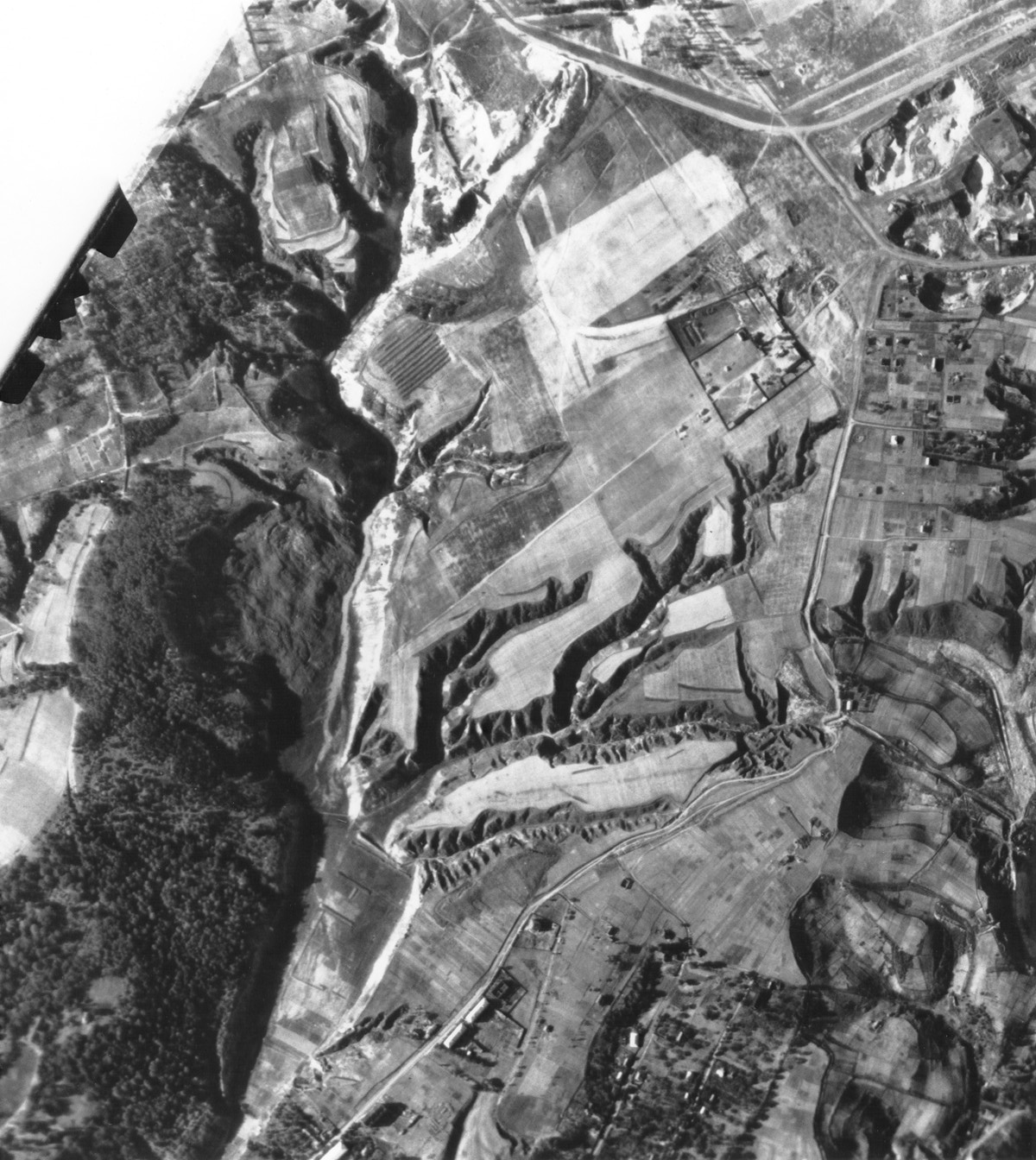
Luftwaffe aerial photograph of Babi Yar, 1943

In the months that followed, thousands more were seized and taken to Babi Yar where they were shot. It is estimated that more than 100,000 residents of Kyiv of all ethnic groups, mostly civilians, were murdered by the Nazis there during World War II. The Syrets concentration camp was also built in the area, which was notorious for its cruelty and execution of three Dynamo Kyiv football players who played in the Match of Death.

Mass executions at Babi Yar continued until the Nazis evacuated the city of Kyiv. On 10 January 1942 about 100 captured Soviet sailors were executed there after being forced to disinter and cremate the bodies of previous victims. In addition, Babi Yar became a place of execution of residents of five Gypsy camps. Patients of the Ivan Pavlov Psychiatric Hospital were gassed and then dumped into the ravine. Thousands of other Ukrainians were murdered at Babi Yar. Ukrainian poet and activist Olena Teliha and her husband, and renowned bandurist Mykhailo Teliha, were murdered there on 21 February 1942. Also murdered in 1941 were Ukrainian activist writer Ivan Rohach, his sister, and his staff.

Upon the Soviet liberation of Kyiv in 1943, Soviet officials led Western journalists to the site of the massacres and allowed them to interview survivors. Among the journalists were Bill Lawrence of The New York Times and Bill Downs of CBS. Downs described in a report to Newsweek what he had been told by one of the survivors, Efim Vilkis:

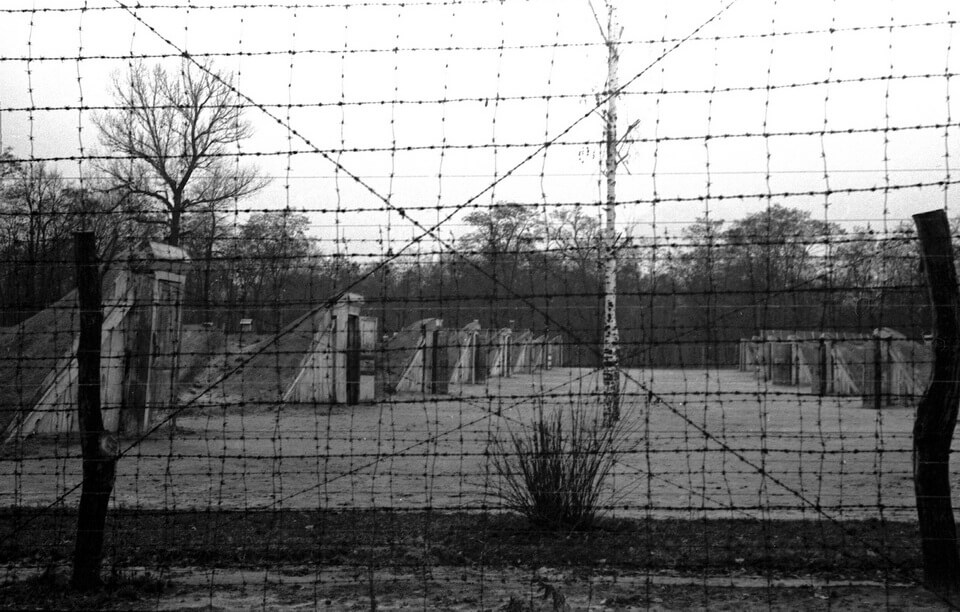
A barbed wire fence of the Syrets concentration camp

However, even more incredible was the action taken by the Nazis between August 19 and September 28 last. Vilkis said that in the middle of August the SS mobilized a party of 100 Russian war prisoners, who were taken to the ravines. On August 19 these men were ordered to disinter all the bodies in the ravine. The Germans meanwhile took a party to a nearby Jewish cemetery whence marble headstones were brought to Babii Yar [sic] to form the foundation of a huge funeral pyre. Atop the stones were piled a layer of wood and then a layer of bodies, and so on until the pyre was as high as a two-story house. Vilkis said that approximately 1,500 bodies were burned in each operation of the furnace and each funeral pyre took two nights and one day to burn completely. The cremation went on for 40 days, and then the prisoners, who by this time included 341 men, were ordered to build another furnace. Since this was the last furnace and there were no more bodies, the prisoners [realized] it was for them. They made a break but only a dozen out of more than 200 survived the bullets of the Nazi machine guns.

== Number of victims ==
Estimates of the total number of people who were murdered at Babi Yar during the Nazi occupation vary. At the Nuremberg trials in 1946, Soviet prosecutor Lev Smirnov claimed that approximately 100,000 corpses were lying in Babi Yar; he made this estimate using documents which were published by the Extraordinary State Commission which the Soviet Union set up in order to investigate Nazi crimes after the liberation of Kyiv in 1943.

In a recently published letter to the Israeli journalist, writer, and translator Shlomo Even-Shoshan which was dated 17 May 1965, Anatoly Kuznetsov commented on the Babi Yar atrocity:

In the two years that followed, Ukrainians, Russians, Gypsies and people of all nationalities were murdered in Babi Yar. The belief that Babi Yar is an exclusively Jewish grave is wrong... It is an international grave. Nobody will ever determine how many and what nationalities are buried there, because 90% of the corpses were burned, their ashes were scattered in ravines and fields.

Researchers studying Ukrainian archives opened in the wake of the 2022 Russian invasion added 1,031 names of slain Jews to a database maintained by the Babyn Yar Holocaust Memorial Center, bringing the total to 33,771. The new names were read along with a recitation of the Kaddish in a ceremony in September 2025.

== Survivors ==
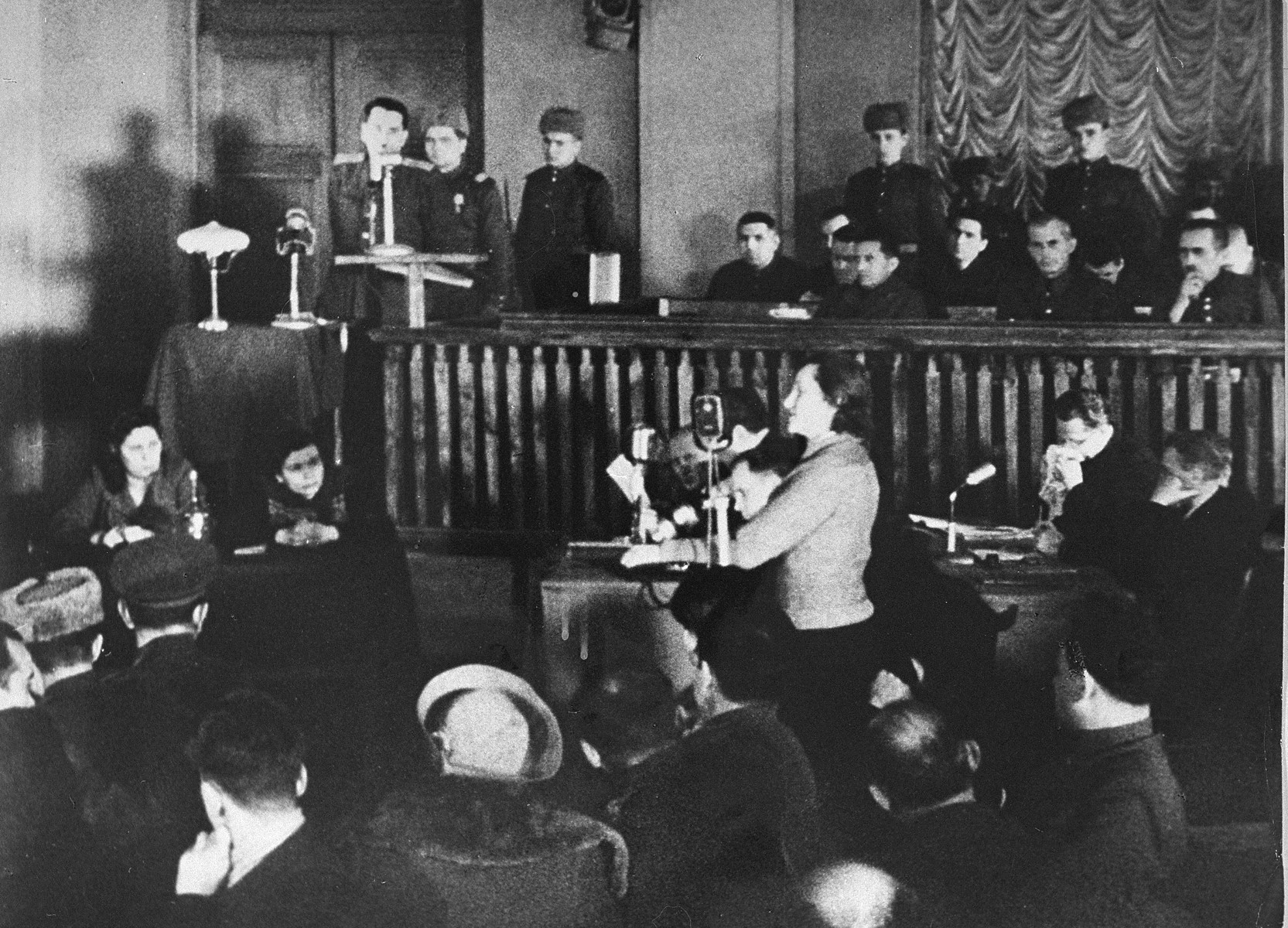
Dina Pronicheva on the witness stand, 24 January 1946, at a Kyiv war-crimes trial of fifteen members of the German police responsible for the occupied Kyiv region

One of the most often-cited parts of Anatoly Kuznetsov's documentary novel Babi Yar is the testimony of Dina Pronicheva, an actress of the Kyiv Puppet Theatre, and a survivor. She was one of those ordered to march to the ravine, to be forced to undress and then be shot. Jumping before being shot and falling on other bodies, she played dead in a pile of corpses. She held perfectly still while the Nazis continued to shoot the wounded or gasping victims. Although the SS had covered the mass grave with earth, she eventually climbed through the soil and escaped. Since it was dark, she had to avoid the torches of the Nazis finishing off the remaining victims still alive, wounded, and gasping in the grave. She was one of the very few survivors of the massacre and later related her story to Kuznetsov. At least 29 survivors are known.

In 2006, Yad Vashem and other Jewish organisations started a project to identify and name the Babi Yar victims. However, so far, only 10% have been identified. Yad Vashem has recorded the names of around 3,000 Jews murdered at Babi Yar, as well as those of some 7,000 Jews from Kyiv who were murdered during the Holocaust.

== Concealment of the crimes ==
Before the Nazis retreated from Kyiv ahead of the Soviet offensive of 1944, they were ordered by Wilhelm Koppe to conceal their atrocities in the East. Paul Blobel, who had been in control of the mass murders in Babi Yar two years earlier, supervised the "special action" Sonderaktion 1005 to eliminate its traces. The Aktion was carried out earlier in all extermination camps. The bodies were exhumed, burned and the ashes were scattered over farmland in the vicinity. Several hundred prisoners of war from the Syrets concentration camp were forced to exhume the bodies for cremation in funeral pyres built atop layers of stolen Jewish gravestones.

== Trials ==
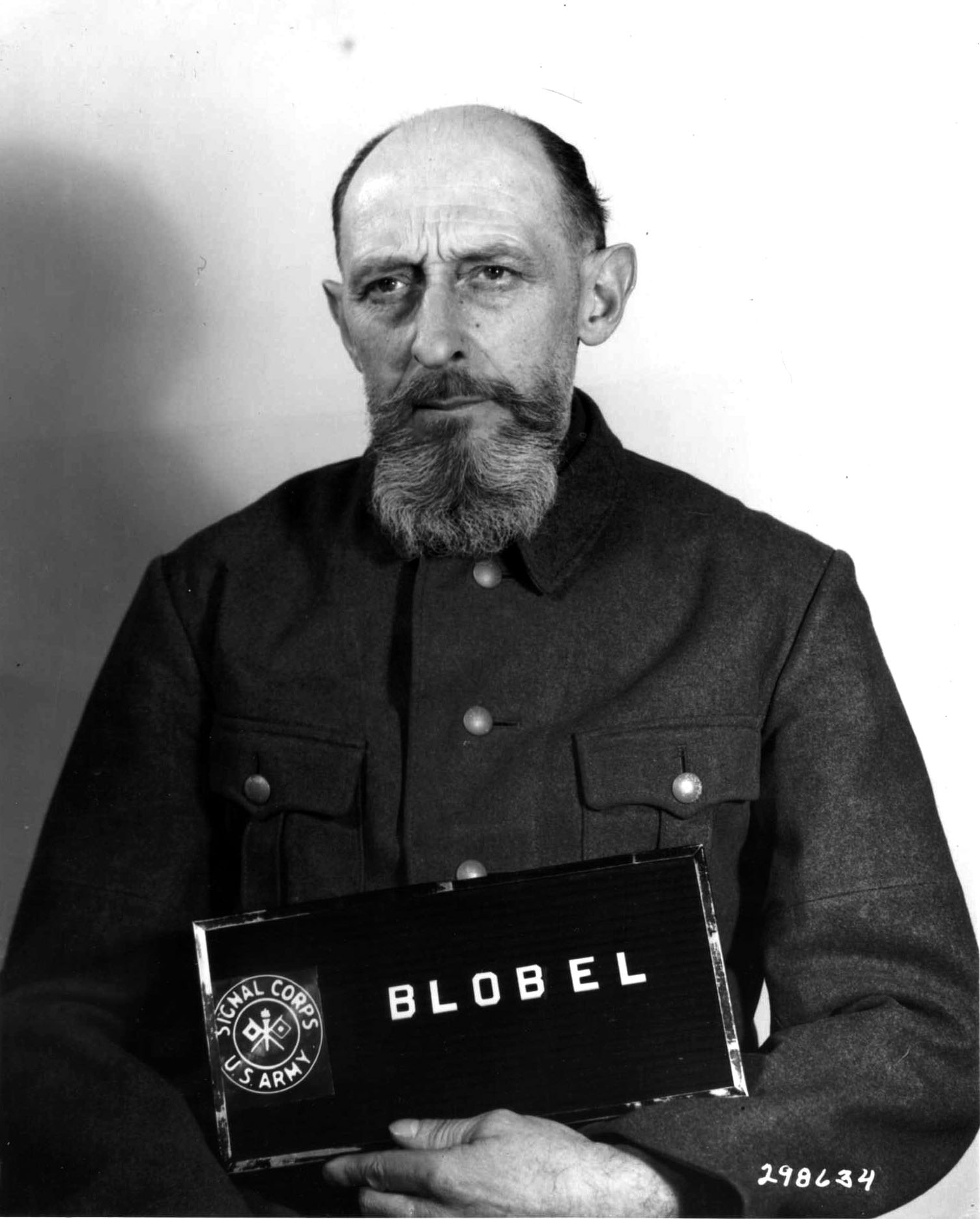
Paul Blobel at the subsequent Nuremberg trials, March 1948

In the aftermath of the war, several SS commanders who had planned and supervised the massacre were arrested and put on trial. Paul Blobel, the overall commander of the SS unit responsible for the massacre, was sentenced to death by the Subsequent Nuremberg Trials in the Einsatzgruppen Trial. He was hanged on 7 June 1951 at Landsberg Prison. Otto Rasch was also indicted in the Einsatzgruppen Trial but his case was discontinued for health reasons, and he died in prison in 1948. Friedrich Jeckeln was convicted of war crimes by a Soviet military tribunal in the Riga Trial, sentenced to death, and hanged on 3 February 1946. Kurt Eberhard was arrested by US authorities; he killed himself in 1947, while in custody awaiting trial.

In January 1946, 15 former members of the German police (including Paul Scheer) were tried in Kyiv over their roles in the massacre and other atrocities. Twelve of them were sentenced to death (Fritz Beckenhof, Karl Burckhardt, Georg Heinisch, Wilhelm Hellerforth, Hans Isenmann, Emil Jogschat, Emil Knoll, Willi Meier, Paul von Scheer, Eckart Hans von Tschammer und Osten, Georg Truckenbrod, and Oskar Walliser). The other three received prison sentences. Those condemned to death were publicly hanged in the town square of Kyiv on 29 January 1946. Erich Koch, who had been Reichskommissar of Ukraine at the time, was tried and sentenced to death by a Polish court for his atrocities in occupied Poland. However, he was never tried for his crimes in occupied Ukraine. His death sentence was commuted to life imprisonment, and he died in prison in 1986.

Two additional perpetrators were given prison sentences at the Nuremberg Trials. In 1967, 11 men were charged for participating in the massacre in a German court in Darmstadt. After a 14 month trial, seven were convicted and sentenced to prison terms ranging between four and fifteen years. In 1971, three more former German police officials were put on trial in Regensburg. The vast majority of the perpetrators were never tried for their roles in the massacre.

== Remembrance ==
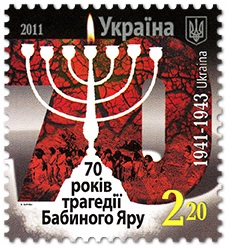
Ukrainian postage stamp, released on the 70th anniversary of the massacre in Babi Yar

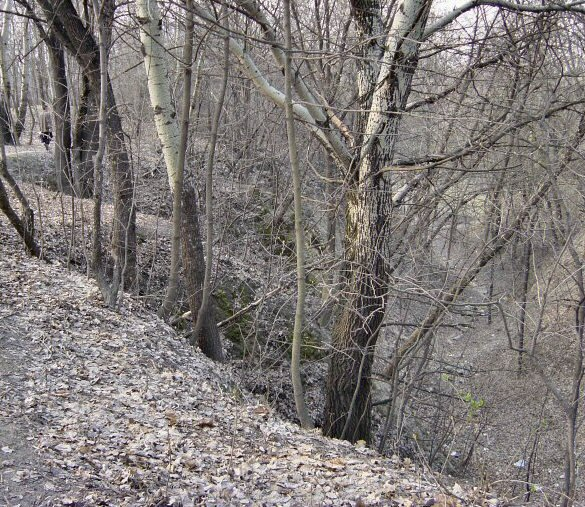
The ravine in 2003

After the war, specifically Jewish and Roma commemoration efforts encountered difficulty because of the Soviet Union's emphasis on secular remembrances honoring all nationalities of the Soviet Union, so memorials (including at Babi Yar) would generally refer to "peaceful victims of fascism". Memorials were not explicitly forbidden, but successive Soviet leaders preferred instead to emphasise the wide-ranging origins of those murdered at the site. This meant that both Jewish and Roma peoples were not specifically memorialised at the Babi Yar site until the Soviet Union collapsed. Indeed, Yevgeny Yevtushenko's 1961 poem on Babi Yar begins "Над Бабьим Яром памятников нет/Nad Babim Yarom pamyatnikov nyet" ("Over Babi Yar there are no monuments"); it is also the first line of Shostakovich's Symphony No. 13.

After the collapse of the Soviet Union, several memorials were erected on the site and elsewhere. The events also formed a part of literature. Babi Yar is located in Kyiv at the juncture of today's Kurenivka, Lukianivka and Syrets districts, between Kyrylivska, Melnykov, and Olena Teliha streets and St. Cyril's Monastery. After the Orange Revolution, President Viktor Yushchenko of Ukraine hosted a major commemoration of the 65th anniversary in 2006, attended by Presidents Moshe Katsav of Israel, Filip Vujanović of Montenegro, Stjepan Mesić of Croatia and Chief Rabbi of Tel Aviv Rabbi Yisrael Meir Lau. Rabbi Lau pointed out that if the world had reacted to the massacre of Babi Yar, perhaps the Holocaust might never have happened. Implying that this impunity emboldened Hitler, Lau speculated:

Maybe, say, this Babi Yar was also a test for Hitler. If on 29 September and 30 September 1941 Babi Yar may happen and the world did not react seriously, dramatically, abnormally, maybe this was a good test for him. So a few weeks later in January 1942, near Berlin in Wannsee, a convention can be held with a decision, a final solution to the Jewish problem ... Maybe if the very action had been a serious one, a dramatic one, in September 1941 here in Ukraine, the Wannsee Conference would have come to a different end, maybe.

In 2006, a message was also delivered on behalf of Kofi Annan, Secretary-General of the United Nations, by his representative, Resident Coordinator Francis Martin O'Donnell, who added a Hebrew prayer O'seh Shalom, from the Mourners' Kaddish.

== Mudslide ==
In the spring of 1961, Babi Yar was the site of a massive mudslide. An earthen dam in the ravine was used to hold loam pulp which had been pumped from the local brick factories without sufficient drainage over the course of ten years. The dam collapsed after it was hit by a heavy rainstorm, resulting in a mudslide that swept away the low-lying Kurenivka neighborhood and several other areas. The death toll was estimated to be between 1,500 and 2,000 people.

== 2022 Russian bombing ==
On 1 March 2022, during the Russian invasion of Ukraine, the site was struck by Russian forces while they were trying to destroy the nearby Kyiv TV Tower. The attack resulted in the death of at least five people.

== See also ==
- Antisemitism in Ukraine
- Babi Yar Holocaust Memorial Center – Museum in Kyiv, Ukraine
- Babi Yar in poetry – Poems about the 1941 Nazi massacre in Ukraine
- Consequences of Nazism
- Genocides in history
- History of the Jews in Ukraine
- List of massacres in Ukraine
- Mass graves in the Soviet Union – Graves of executed Soviet citizens and foreigners
- Nazi crimes against Soviet POWs
- Operation Barbarossa – 1941 Axis invasion of the Soviet Union during WWII
- Reichskommissariat Ukraine – Territory of Nazi Germany from 1941 to 1944
- Symphony No. 1 In Memoriam to the Martyrs of Babi Yar by Dmitri Klebanov (1945)
- Symphony No. 13 by Dmitri Shostakovich, which includes a setting of Yevgeny Yevtushenko's poem Babi Yar
- The Holocaust in Ukraine
- The Kindly Ones – Book by Jonathan Littell
- Ukrainian collaborationism with the Axis powers
- Ukrainian cultural heritage during the 2022 Russian invasion
- Valley of Death (Bydgoszcz) – Mass murder of Polish civilians, 1939

== General and cited sources ==
- A. Anatoli (Anatoly Kuznetsov), trans. David Floyd (1970), Babi Yar: A Document in the Form of a Novel, Jonathan Cape Ltd. ISBN 0-671-45135-9
- "Babi Yar in the mirror of science, or the map of Bermuda Triangle", an article in Dzerkalo Tyzhnia (The Mirror Weekly), July 2005, available online (in Ukrainian)
