= Kyiv Academic Puppet Theatre =

Theatre in Kyiv

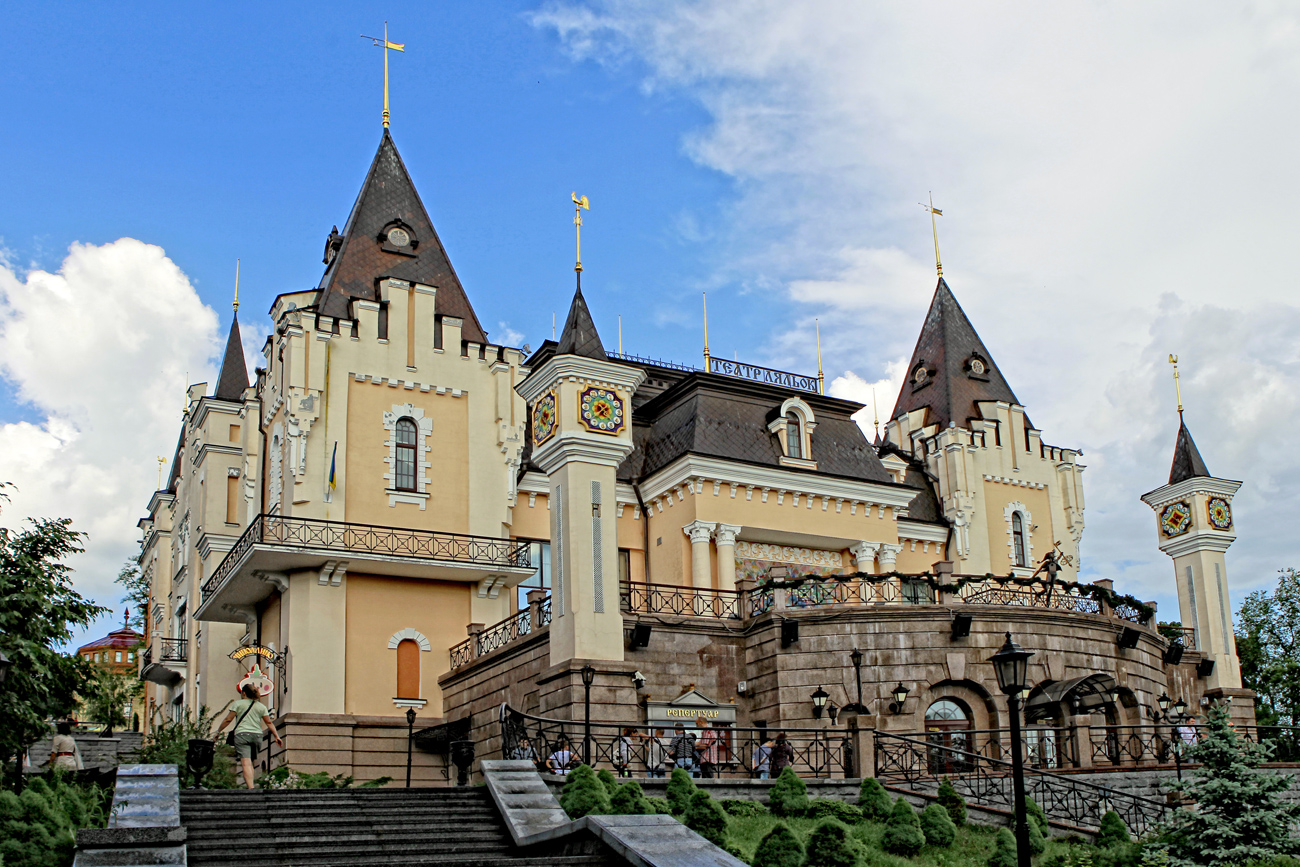
- Kyiv Academic Puppet Theatre
- Interactive map of Kyiv Academic Puppet Theatre
- Address: vul. Hrushevskoho, 1a (European Sq); Kyiv; Ukraine
- Coordinates: 50.451944°N 30.530556°E
- Capacity: 300 and 100 seats

Construction
- Opened: 1927-10-27

Website
- http://www.akadempuppet.kiev.ua/

The Kyiv Academic Puppet Theatre (Ukrainian: Київський державний академічний театр ляльок, romanized: Kyivskyi derzhavnyi akademichnyi teatr lialok) is a theatre in Kyiv in Ukraine. It was founded on October 27, 1927. It is the oldest puppet theatre in Kyiv.

The current building was presented to the theatre company on 19 December 2005 and it was the first time they had a purpose built building to host the theatre. The conception and construction of the building was managed by renowned architect Yuriy Bilokon and even from the beginning it was dubbed 'The Fairytale Castle'.
