= Anatoly Kuznetsov =

Soviet writer (1929–1979)

- Анатолий Кузнецов
- Kuznetsov in the mid-1960s
- Born: 18 August 1929; Kiev, Ukrainian SSR, Soviet Union
- Died: 13 June 1979 (aged 49); London, United Kingdom

Anatoly Vasilievich Kuznetsov (Russian: Анатолий Васильевич Кузнецов; 18 August 1929 – 13 June 1979) was a Russian-language Soviet writer who described his experiences in German-occupied Kiev during World War II in his internationally acclaimed novel Babi Yar: A Document in the Form of a Novel. The book was originally published in a censored form in 1966 in the Russian language.

== Career in the USSR ==
Kuznetsov was born to a Russian father and a Ukrainian mother, his passport stated that he was Russian. He grew up in the Kiev district of Kurenivka, in his own words "a stone's throw from a vast ravine, whose name, Babi Yar, was once known only to locals." At the age fourteen, Kuznetsov began recording in a notebook everything he saw as a witness and heard about the Babi Yar massacre. Once his mother discovered and read his notes. She cried and advised him to save them for a book he might write someday.

Before becoming a writer, Kuznetsov experimented with ballet, acting, art, and music, found employment as a carpenter and labourer, and worked on the Kakhovka, Irkutsk, and Bratsk hydroelectric power plants. In 1955, he joined the Communist Party of the Soviet Union. Eventually, he began "studying to become a writer" and enrolled at the Maxim Gorky Literature Institute.

In 1957, literary magazine Yunost featured his novella entitled Sequel to a Legend. Kuznetsov described his first experience with publishers as follows:

I wrote the novella 'Sequel to a Legend' and offered it to Yunost magazine. It tells the story of a young man, who came to work in Siberia with a solid youthful belief in something better, in some ultimate good, despite all the hardships and poverty. The Yunost editors liked the novella very much but said they couldn't publish it: the censors wouldn't allow it, the magazine would be closed, and I would be arrested or, in the worst case, barred from literature for life. Above all, Western propagandists might pick up this story and run with it: "See, this is proof of how terrible life in the Soviet Union really is!" Experienced writers told me that the novella could be saved, that at least a part of it must be brought to the readers' attention, that they would know what came from the heart and what I had to write for form's sake, and that I should add some optimistic episodes. For a long time my novella gathered dust without any hope of being published, but eventually I forced myself to add some optimistic episodes, which contrasted so sharply with the overall style and were so outrageously cheerful that no reader would take them seriously.

The novella was turned down, but eventually was published in a heavily censored form and without the author's approval. It was this version that earned him a countrywide fame. He graduated in 1960 and was admitted to the USSR Union of Writers and, by extension, to the State Literary Fund. In the 1960s he became famous as one of the country's most talented and progressive writers, the father of the genre of confessional prose.

He married Iryna Marchenko and was preparing to become a father. Soon he and his pregnant wife moved to Tula.

The novel Babi Yar, published in Yunost in 1966, cemented Anatoly Kuznetsov's fame. The novel included the previously unknown materials about the execution of 33,771 Jews in the course of two days, 29–30 September 1941, in the Kiev ravine Babi Yar. The uncensored work included materials highly critical of the Soviet regime. Working on it was not easy. Kuznetsov recalled: "For a whole month in Kiev I had nightmares, which wore me out so much that I had to leave without finishing my work and temporarily switch to other tasks in order to regain my senses." In a letter to the Israeli journalist, writer, and translator Shlomo Even-Shoshan dated 17 May 1965, Kuznetsov commented on the Babi Yar tragedy:

Before September 29, 1941, Jews were slowly being murdered in camps behind a veneer of legitimacy. Treblinka, Auschwitz, etc. came later. Since Babyn Yar murder became commonplace. I trust you know how they did this. They published an order for all the Jews in the city to gather in the vicinity of the freight yard with their belongings and valuables. Then they surrounded them and began shooting them. Countless Russians, Ukrainians, and other people, who had come to see their relatives and friends "off to the train," died in the swarm. They didn't shoot children but buried them alive, and didn't finish off the wounded. The fresh earth over the mass graves was alive with movement. In the two years that followed, Russians, Ukrainians, Gypsies, and people of all nationalities were executed in Babyn Yar. The belief that Babyn Yar is an exclusively Jewish grave is wrong, and Yevtushenko portrayed only one aspect of Babyn Yar in his poem. It is an international grave. Nobody will ever determine how many and what nationalities are buried there, because 90% of the corpses were burned, their ashes scattered in ravines and fields.

A shortened version of the novel was republished in 1967 in Russian by Molodaya Gvardiya publishing house without the author's permission.

== After defection ==
Soon after the Soviet invasion of Czechoslovakia, 20–21 August 1968, Kuznetsov defected from the USSR to the United Kingdom. His pretext for travelling abroad was to do research for his new book on Lenin's stay in Britain. He managed to sew into his coat 35-mm photographic film containing the uncensored manuscript of Babi Yar as well as at least six others of his novels that he had secretly written in the USSR and hidden in buried tin cans.

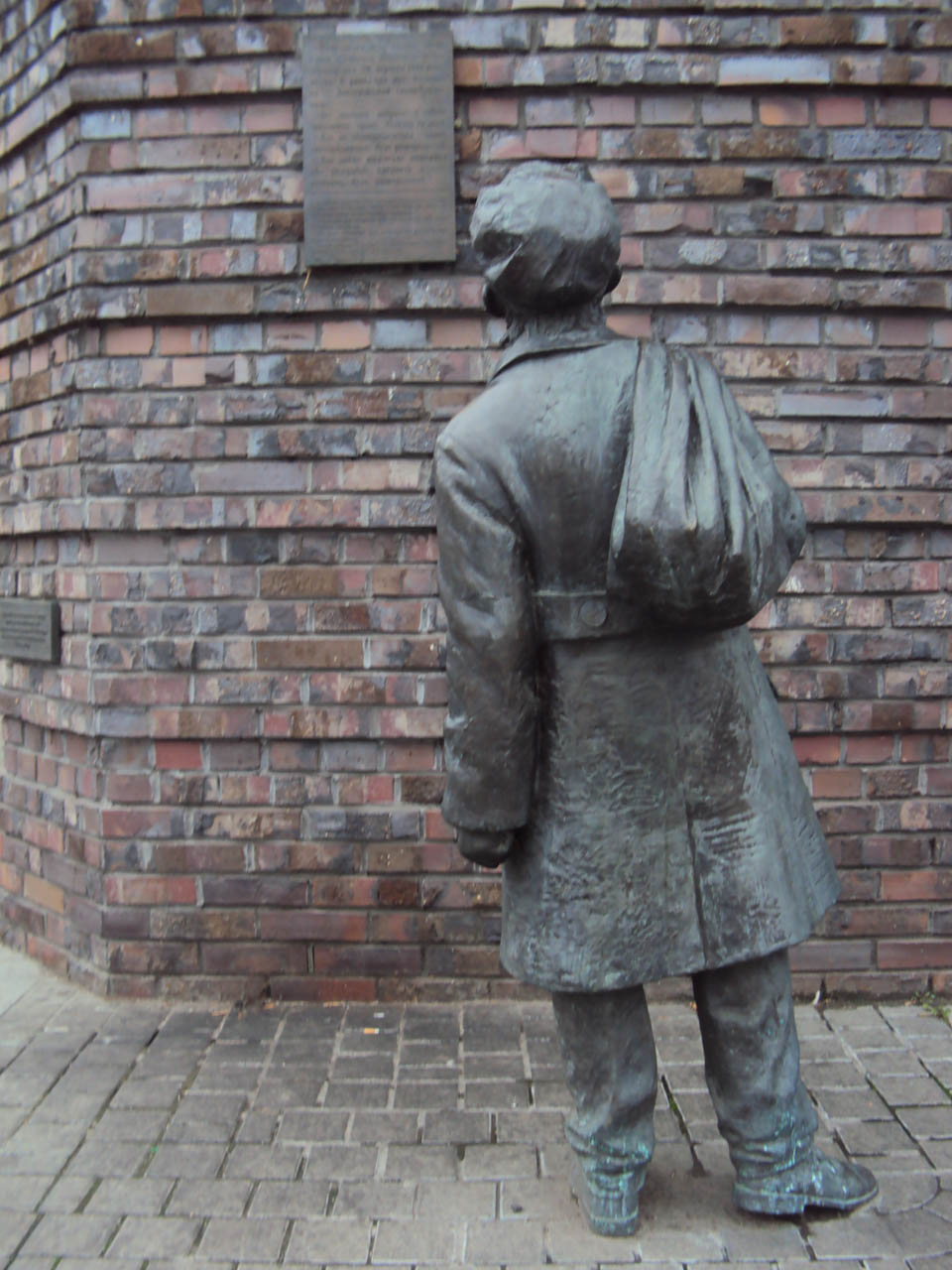
Memorial sign to Anatoly Kuznetsov as the young hero of his Babi Yar novel. Kyiv, Kurenivka

He arrived in London on a two-week visa, accompanied by Georgy Andjaparidze, a suspected KGB mamka, a secret police agent. Kuznetsov managed to trick Andjaparidze by saying he wanted to find a prostitute and instead ran for the nearest British government office. There he was connected over the phone with David Floyd, a Russian-speaking journalist and The Daily Telegraph's Soviet expert. Risking being caught, Kuznetsov returned to the hotel to pick up his manuscripts, his favourite typewriter and Cuban cigars.

Home Secretary James Callaghan and Prime Minister Harold Wilson decided to grant Kuznetsov an unlimited residence visa in the UK. Shortly after the public announcement of the British decision, Soviet Ambassador Mikhail Smirnovsky demanded the author's return, but Callaghan refused. Two days later, Smirnovsky called on Foreign Secretary Michael Stewart and asked that Soviet diplomats be allowed to see Kuznetsov, but Kuznetsov refused to meet with his countrymen. Instead, he wrote a declaration of his reasons for leaving and three letters: one to the Soviet government, another to the Communist Party of the Soviet Union, and a third to the USSR Union of Writers.

The Sunday Telegraph published David Floyd's interview with Kuznetsov, who spoke about his ties with the KGB, how he was recruited, and how he had formally agreed to cooperate in order to be allowed to leave abroad.

Babi Yar was published in the US in 1970 under pseudonym A. Anatoli. In that edition, the censored Soviet version was put in regular type, the content cut by censors in heavier type and newly added material was in brackets. In the foreword to the edition by the Russian emigre publishing house Posev, Kuznetsov wrote:

In the summer of 1969 I escaped from the USSR with photographic films, including films containing the unabridged text of Babi Yar. I am publishing it as my first book free of all political censorship, and I am asking you to consider this edition of Babi Yar as the only authentic text. It contains the text published originally, everything that was expurgated by the censors, and what I wrote after the publication, including the final stylistic polish. Finally, this is what I wrote.

During Kuznetsov's émigré years, he worked for Radio Liberty, travelled a great deal, but did not publish any of his secret works, for he found them outdated in contrast to the western literature that he had only recently learned about. He didn't write anything for ten years.

Babi Yar was reissued by Picador (division of Farrar, Straus and Giroux in US) with a new introduction by Masha Gessen in 2023 near the one year anniversary of Russia's invasion of Ukraine.

Kuznetzov died in London in 1979 from his third heart attack and was buried on the eastern side of Highgate Cemetery.

== Memorial ==
- Memorial and plaque (Kyiv, Kurenivka)

== See also ==
- List of Eastern Bloc defectors

== Publications ==
- A. Anatoli, Babi Yar: A Document in the Form of a Novel, Trans. David Floyd (New York: Farrar, Straus and Giroux, 1970) Reissued 2023, paperback.
- Анатолий Кузнецов (2011). На "Свободе". Беседы у микрофона 1972-1979 (in Russian). Moscow: Corpus. ISBN 978-5-271-36288-0.
- Анатолий Кузнецов (2005). "Я дошел до точки..." Novy Mir (in Russian) (4).
