= List of major perpetrators of the Holocaust =

This is a list of major perpetrators of the Holocaust.

== List ==
Name	Photograph	Date of birth	Date of death	Age at death	Role	Fate
Adolf Hitler		April 20, 1889	April 30, 1945	56 years, 10 days	Führer (leader) of the Nazi Party and the Third Reich	Committed suicide by gunshot
Heinrich Himmler		October 7, 1900	May 23, 1945	44 years, 228 days	Reichsführer-SS Chief of German Police; Reich Minister of the Interior	Arrested; committed suicide by biting down on a cyanide capsule
Hermann Göring		January 12, 1893	October 15, 1946	53 years, 276 days	Commander-in-Chief of the Luftwaffe; President of the Reichstag; Reichsminister of Aviation; Established the Final Solution as official policy in July 1941.	Sentenced to death by hanging at The Nuremberg Trials; committed suicide by cyanide poisoning hours before his scheduled execution
Reinhard Heydrich		March 7, 1904	June 4, 1942	38 years, 89 days	Chief of the Reich Security Main Office (RSHA) Deputy Reich-Protector of Bohemia and Moravia (acting Protector)	Assassinated; died of sepsis caused by injuries
Adolf Eichmann		March 19, 1906	June 1, 1962	56 years, 74 days	Head of the Gestapo Office of Jewish Affairs (RSHA Sub-Department IV-B4). Charged by Reinhard Heydrich with facilitating and managing the mass deportations of Jews to ghettos and extermination camps in Eastern Europe.	Evaded arrest and escaped to Argentina in 1950. Discovered and kidnapped by Israeli agents in May 1960; subsequently brought to Israel, tried and executed by hanging in 1962.
Heinrich Müller		April 28, 1900	Unknown, but evidence points to May 1945	Unknown	SS-Gruppenführer und Generalleutnant der Polizei, Chief of the Gestapo 1939–45	Disappeared; possibly killed in Berlin in May 1945 (unconfirmed)
Joseph Goebbels		October 29, 1897	May 1, 1945	47 years, 184 days	Chief Propagandist of the Nazi Party, Reich Minister of Propaganda; Brief Chancellor of Germany	Committed suicide by cyanide poisoning
Albert Speer		March 19, 1905	September 1, 1981	76 years, 166 days	Reich Minister of Armaments and War Production denied any involvement of knowledge of the Holocaust, letters found after his death proved he was aware amongst other crimes	Sentenced to 20-year imprisonment at The Nuremberg Trials. Released in 1966; died in 1981
Odilo Globocnik		April 21, 1904	May 31, 1945	41 years, 40 days	SS and Police Leader in the General Government Head of Operation Reinhard	Committed suicide by cyanide poisoning
Theodor Eicke		October 17, 1892	February 26, 1943	50 years, 132 days	A major figure in the creation of the Nazi concentration camps First commander of SS Division Totenkopf, which became notorious for its war crimes.	Killed in action in the Third Battle of Kharkov
Richard Glücks		April 22, 1889	May 10, 1945	56 years, 18 days	Head of Concentration Camp Operations (Amt D: Konzentrationslagerwesen) in the SS Main Economic and Administrative Department (SS-Wirtschafts-Verwaltungshauptamt)	Committed suicide by cyanide poisoning
Albert Ganzenmüller		February 25, 1905	March 20, 1996	91 years, 23 days	Head of Deutsche Reichsbahn and State Secretary in Reich Ministry of Transport, involved with the mass deportations of German Jews to concentration camps and ghettos, also involved with the deportation of ghetto's residents to extermination camps	Died of natural causes
Julius Streicher		February 12, 1885	October 16, 1946	61 years, 246 days	Gauleiter of Franconia (1 March 1929 – 16 February 1940) Publisher of the antisemitic weekly propaganda newspaper Der Stürmer	Sentenced to death by hanging at The Nuremberg Trials and executed
Ernst Kaltenbrunner		October 4, 1903	October 16, 1946	43 years, 12 days	Chief of the Reich Security Main Office after Heydrich was assassinated	Sentenced to death by hanging at The Nuremberg Trials and executed
Hans Frank		May 23, 1900	October 16, 1946	46 years, 146 days	Governor-General of the General Government	Sentenced to death by hanging at The Nuremberg Trials and executed
Karl Wolff		May 13, 1900	July 17, 1984	84 years, 66 days	Chief of Personal Staff Reichsführer-SS, liaison officer between SS and Adolf Hitler, Supreme SS and Police Leader in occupied Italy	Sentenced to 5 years in prison by a denazification court in 1948; released in 1949 after sentence reduced to 4 years; re-arrested in 1962; sentenced to 15 years in prison in 1964; released in 1971; died in 1984
Arthur Seyss-Inquart		July 22, 1892	October 16, 1946	54 years, 86 days	Reichskommissar of the Netherlands Deputy Governor-General of the General Government, (October 12, 1939 – May 18, 1940) Reich Minister of Foreign Affairs (April 30 to May 2, 1945), succeeding Ribbentrop.	Sentenced to death by hanging at The Nuremberg Trials and executed
Josef Bühler		February 16, 1904	August 22, 1948	44 years, 188 days	State Secretary and deputy to Hans Frank, (May 18, 1940 – January 19, 1945)	Executed by hanging
Martin Bormann		June 17, 1900	May 2, 1945	44 years, 319 days	Head of the Nazi Party Chancellery Private Secretary to Adolf Hitler	Sentenced to death by hanging in absentia; believed to have committed suicide to avoid capture in Berlin; the buried body was not found until 1972; the remains were conclusively identified in 1998.
Otto Georg Thierack		April 19, 1889	October 26, 1946	57 years, 190 days	Head of NSRB, Minister of Justice in Saxony, President of the Academy for German Law (20 August 1942 – 8 May 1945), Minister of Justice (24 August 1942 – 2 May 1945), Judge President of the People's Court, co-responsible for creating and establishing antisemitic and totalitarian laws that led to the Final Solution and justified terror in occupied territories.	Committed suicide by poisoning
Kurt Daluege		September 15, 1897	October 24, 1946	49 years, 39 days	Chief of the Ordnungspolizei Deputy Reich-Protector of Bohemia and Moravia (acting Protector)	Executed by hanging
Oswald Pohl		June 30, 1892	June 7, 1951	58 years, 343 days	Chief of the SS-Wirtschafts-Verwaltungshauptamt (SS Main Economic and Administrative Department), the central SS financial office responsible for overall administration of the concentration camps. Directed the construction of Auschwitz, Majdanek, and Stutthof	Executed by hanging
Karl Hermann Frank		January 24, 1898	May 22, 1946	48 years, 118 days	State Secretary and SS and Police Leader in Bohemia and Moravia	Executed by hanging
Alois Brunner		April 8, 1912	December 2001 or December 2010	89 or 98	Deputy to Adolf Eichmann; organised the deportations of at least 140,000 Jews from France, Greece, Slovakia and Austria. Commandant of the Drancy internment camp.	Escaped to Egypt around 1954, then fled to Syria. Served as a consultant to the al-Assad regime on torture techniques; died in Syria of natural causes in December 2001
Theodor Dannecker		March 27, 1913	December 10, 1945	32 years, 258 days	Deputy to Adolf Eichmann; Head of the SD Hauptamt – Judenreferat (SD Head Office – Jewish Affairs Department) for Paris: September 1940 – July 1942 In charge of the Final Solution in Bulgaria, the Balkans and Hungary (from 1943)	Arrested by the U.S. military; committed suicide
Wilhelm Keitel		September 22, 1882	October 16, 1946	64 years, 24 days	Minister of War and chief of the Supreme Command of the Armed Forces	Sentenced to death by hanging at The Nuremberg Trials and executed. See War crimes of the Wehrmacht.
Kurt Knoblauch		December 10, 1885	November 10, 1952	66 years, 336 days	Chief of the Kommandostab Reichsführer-SS under Himmler. Coordinated Waffen-SS operations during the Pripyat Marshes massacres	Sentenced to two years imprisonment in 1949; died in 1952.
Wilhelm Frick		March 13, 1877	October 16, 1946	69 years, 215 days	Reich Minister of the Interior (30 January - 20 August 1943), Reich Minister without Portfolio (24 August 1943 -30 April 1945), Protector of Bohemia and Moravia (24 August 1943 – 8 May 1945) Co-authored the Nuremberg Laws	Sentenced to death by hanging at The Nuremberg Trials and executed
Hermann Höfle		June 19, 1911	August 20, 1962	51 years, 62 days	Coordinator of Operation Reinhard	Arrested; committed suicide by hanging
Ante Pavelić		July 14, 1889	December 28, 1959	70 years, 167 days	Leader of the Independent State of Croatia	Escaped to Argentina in 1948 via the ratlines in Spain. Died from wounds sustained from an assassination attempt in 1957.
Bruno Tesch		August 14, 1890	May 16, 1946	55 years, 275 days	Sold Zyklon B to the SS, knowing that it would be used to exterminate concentration camp prisoners	Executed by hanging
Karl Weinbacher		June 23, 1898	May 16, 1946	47 years, 327 days	Sold Zyklon B to the SS, knowing that it would be used to exterminate concentration camp prisoners	Executed by hanging
Fritz ter Meer		July 4, 1884	October 27, 1967	83 years, 115 days	Member of the board of IG Farben and Bayer, co-responsible for creation of Monowitz concentration camp and usage of slave labor	Spent 4 years in prison, died of natural causes.
Viktor Brack		November 9, 1904	June 2, 1948	43 years, 206 days	Organizer for Aktion T4 Extensively involved in the process of establishment of extermination camps for Operation Reinhard	Executed by hanging
Carl Oberg		January 27, 1897	June 3, 1965	68 years, 99 days	SS and Police Leader in Radom District (General Government) August 1941- May 1942, Higher SS and Police Leader in occupied France May 1942 - November 1944	Died of natural causes
Helmut Knochen		March 14, 1910	April 4, 2003	93 years, 21 days	Commandant of SiPo and SD in Paris, involved in mass deportations of the French Jews and also the French population in general	Sentenced to death in 1947 and 1954; commuted to life imprisonment; released in 1962; died in 2003
Walter Schimana		March 12, 1898	September 12, 1948	50 years, 184 days	SS and Police Leader in occupied Soviet Union (central Russia and Belarus), Higher SS and Police Leader in occupied Greece	Arrested; committed suicide by hanging
Erwin Lambert		December 7, 1909	October 15, 1976	66 years, 313 days	Head of gas chamber construction during Operation Reinhard	Served four years in prison after one trial, acquitted after a second trial on separate charges
Christian Wirth		November 24, 1885	May 26, 1944	58 years, 184 days	Inspector of Aktion T4 and Operation Reinhard; Commandant of Bełżec, March 17, 1942 – end of August 1942	Assassinated
Rudolf Höss		November 25, 1901	April 16, 1947	45 years, 142 days	Commandant of Auschwitz, May 4, 1940 – December 1, 1943, May 8, 1944 – January 18, 1945	Executed by hanging
Arthur Liebehenschel		November 25, 1901	January 24, 1948	46 years, 60 days	Commandant of Auschwitz, December 1, 1943 – May 8, 1944 Commandant of Majdanek, May 19, 1944 – July 22, 1944	Executed by hanging
Richard Baer		September 9, 1911	June 17, 1963	51 years, 279 days	Commandant of Auschwitz, May 1944 – February 1945 Commandant of Mittelbau-Dora, February 1945 – April 1945	Arrested in 1960; died in prison while awaiting trial in 1963
Josef Kramer		November 10, 1906	December 13, 1945	39 years, 33 days	Commandant of Auschwitz-Birkenau (1944) Commandant of Bergen-Belsen (1944–1945)	Executed by hanging
Martin Weiss		June 3, 1905	May 29, 1946	40 years, 360 days	Commandant of Dachau, January 3, 1942 – September 30, 1943 Commandant of Dachau, April 26, 1945 – April 28, 1945; Commandant of Neuengamme, April 1940 – August 1942; Commandant of Majdanek, November 1943 – May 1944	Executed by hanging
Hans Kammler		August 26, 1901	1945 (assumed)	44 years (assumed)	A deputy to Oswald Pohl in WVHA and chief of its Office C that was responsible for designing and building concentration camps, including gas chambers and crematoria.	Disappeared
Alexander Piorkowski		October 11, 1904	October 22, 1948	44 years, 11 days	Commandant of Dachau, February 1940 – September 1942	Executed by hanging
Otto Förschner		November 4, 1902	May 28, 1946	43 years, 205 days	Commandant of Mittelbau-Dora, October 1944 – January 1945	Executed by hanging
Max Pauly		June 1, 1907	October 8, 1946	39 years, 129 days	Commandant of Stutthof, September 1939 – August 1942 Commandant of Neuengamme, September 1942 – May 1945	Executed by hanging
Heinrich Schwarz		June 14, 1906	March 20, 1947	40 years, 279 days	Commandant of Monowitz, Commandant of Natzweiler-Struthof, February 1945 – April 1945	Executed by firing squad
Karl-Otto Koch		August 2, 1897	April 5, 1945	47 years, 246 days	Commandant of Buchenwald, August 1, 1937 – September 1941 Commandant of Majdanek, September 1941 – August 24, 1942	Executed by firing squad by Nazi Germany for multiple "unauthorized murders" and embezzlement
Paul-Werner Hoppe		February 28, 1910	July 15, 1974	64 years, 196 days	Commandant of Stutthof concentration camp, September 1942 - April 1945	Arrested in Italy in 1946; escaped in 1949; re-arrested in 1953; sentenced to 5 years and three months in prison, later increased to nine years; released in 1960; died in 1974
Karl Chmielewski		July 16, 1903	December 1, 1991	88 years, 138 days	Commandant of Gusen concentration camp, 1940-1942, commandant of Herzogenbusch concentration camp, 1943	Arrested in 1959 in West Germany, released in 1979 on health grounds. Died of natural causes
Hans Loritz		December 12, 1895	January 31, 1946	50 years, 50 days	Commandant of Esterwegen concentration camp, July 1934 - April 1936, commandant of Dachau, April 1936 - July 1939, commandant of Sachsenhausen, March 1940 - September 1942, commandant of several work camps in Norway, 1942 - 1945	Committed suicide in internment camp
Hermann Pister		February 21, 1885	September 28, 1948	63 years, 250 days	Commandant of Buchenwald, August 1, 1937 – September 1941	Sentenced to death by hanging, died awaiting execution
Irmfried Eberl		September 8, 1910	February 16, 1948	37 years, 161 days	Commandant of Treblinka, July 11, 1942 – August 26, 1942	Arrested; committed suicide by hanging
Hans Bothmann		November 11, 1911	April 4, 1946	34 years, 144 days	Commandant of Chelmno, April 1942 – July 1944	Arrested by the British Army; committed suicide by hanging
Herbert Lange		September 29, 1909	April 20, 1945	35 years, 203 days	Commandant of Chelmno, December 1941 – March 1942	Killed in action during the Battle of Berlin
Franz Stangl		March 26, 1908	June 28, 1971	63 years, 94 days	Commandant of Sobibor, April 28, 1942 – August 30, 1942; Commandant of Treblinka, September 1, 1942 – August 1943	Arrested on February 28, 1967; sentenced to life imprisonment on October 22, 1970; died in prison
Kurt Franz		January 17, 1914	July 4, 1998	84 years, 168 days	Commandant of Treblinka, August 1943 – October 19, 1943	Arrested on December 2, 1959; sentenced to life imprisonment in 1965; released on health grounds in 1993
Vjekoslav Luburić		March 6, 1914	April 20, 1969	55 years, 45 days	Croatian Ustaše official who headed the system of concentration camps in the Independent State of Croatia (NDH) during much of World War II	Murdered in exile
Richard Thomalla		October 23, 1903	May 12, 1945	41 years, 201 days	In charge of construction for the Operation Reinhard death camps: Bełżec, Sobibor and Treblinka	Extrajudicially executed by the NKVD
Franz Reichleitner		December 2, 1906	January 3, 1944	37 years, 32 days	Commandant of Sobibor, September 1, 1942 – October 17, 1943	Killed in action
Karl Streibel		October 11, 1903	August 5, 1986	82 years, 298 days	Commandant of Trawniki, October 21, 1941 – June 24, 1944 Responsible for the training of the Trawniki men, who operated the gas chambers and performed executions at all of the major Operation Reinhard camps as well as in the ghettos	Acquitted of war crimes; died a free man
Gottlieb Hering		June 2, 1887	October 9, 1945	58 years, 129 days	Commandant of Bełżec, end of August 1942 – June 1943	Died of mysterious health complications
Amon Göth		December 11, 1908	September 13, 1946	37 years, 276 days	Commandant of Kraków-Płaszów	Executed by hanging
Siegfried Seidl		August 24, 1911	February 4, 1947	35 years, 164 days	Commandant of Theresienstadt, November 1941 – July 1943 Leading member of the Sondereinsatzkommando Eichmann, which organized the mass deportations of approximately 437,000 Hungarian Jews, hundreds of thousands of whom were sent to Auschwitz and gassed	Executed by hanging
Karl Rahm		April 2, 1907	April 30, 1947	40 years, 28 days	Commandant of Theresienstadt, January 1944 – May 1945	Executed by hanging
Max Koegel		October 16, 1895	June 27, 1946	50 years, 254 days	Commandant of Ravensbrück, January 1940 – August 1942 Commandant of Majdanek, August 1942 – November 1942; Commandant of Flossenbürg, April 1943 – April 1945	Arrested; committed suicide by hanging
Fritz Suhren		June 10, 1908	June 12, 1950	42 years, 2 days	Commandant of Ravensbrück, August 1942 – April 1945	Executed by firing squad
Franz Ziereis		August 13, 1905	May 25, 1945	39 years, 285 days	Commandant of Mauthausen, February 1939-May 1945	Shot by American soldiers while trying to escape, died of his injuries the next day
Aleksander Laak		August 24, 1907	September 6, 1960	53 years, 13 days	Commandant of Jägala	Committed suicide by hanging in Canada, allegedly to protect his relatives from potential reprisals
Hans Aumeier		August 20, 1906	January 24, 1948	41 years, 157 days	Commandant of Vaivara, August 1943 – November 1943 Deputy commandant at Auschwitz	Executed by hanging
Hanns Rauter		February 4, 1895	March 24, 1949	54 years, 48 days	Higher SS and Police Leader (HSSPF) for the Netherlands	Executed by firing squad
Walter Rauff		June 19, 1906	May 14, 1984	77 years, 330 days	Close aide of Reinhard Heydrich. Group Leader II D of the RSHA (technical matters). Designed gas vans to poison Jews, and persons with disabilities. Einsatzkommando leader in North Africa (1942–43), SS and Gestapo commander in northwest Italy (1943–45).	Arrested in Italy in 1945; escaped in 1946, fled to Syria in 1948, to Ecuador in 1949, to Chile in 1958. Extradition request by Germany denied by Chile in 1963 on the grounds of expired statute of limitations. Most wanted Nazi fugitive in the 1970s and 1980s. Died of natural causes in Chile in 1984.
Eduard Wirths		September 4, 1909	September 20, 1945	36 years, 16 days	Human medical experimentation, and formal responsibility of medical staff at Auschwitz	Arrested; committed suicide by hanging
Josef Mengele		March 16, 1911	February 7, 1979	67 years, 328 days	Human medical experimentation, particularly children, and selection of prisoners to be gassed at Auschwitz	Escaped to Brazil; evaded arrest and suffered a heart attack while swimming in 1979
Fritz Katzmann		May 6, 1906	September 19, 1957	51 years, 136 days	SS and Police Leader of the District of Galicia; Responsible for the establishment of the Lwów Ghetto, which had a population of 120,000 Polish Jews, only 823 surviving after the war. SS and Police Leader of Radom District; In charge of the establishment of the Radom Ghetto, which enclosed about 33,000 Polish Jews, the majority of whom died.	Evaded arrest after the war and died in 1957
Philipp Bouhler		September 11, 1899	May 19, 1945	45 years, 250 days	Chief of the Chancellery of the Führer of the NSDAP, Director of Aktion T4 and Aktion 14f13	Arrested; committed suicide by cyanide poisoning
Karl Brandt		January 8, 1904	June 2, 1948	44 years, 146 days	Co-director of Aktion T4 Conducted human medical experimentation	Executed by hanging
Werner Heyde		April 25, 1902	February 13, 1964	61 years, 294 days	Head of the SS-Totenkopfverbände medical unit	Arrested in 1945; escaped custody in 1947; turned himself in 1959; committed suicide by hanging while awaiting trial in 1964
Paul Nitsche		November 25, 1876	March 25, 1948	71 years, 121 days	Senior medical expert for Aktion T4	Executed by guillotine
Ernst-Robert Grawitz		June 8, 1899	April 24, 1945	45 years, 320 days	Involved in Aktion T4 and human medical experimentation in concentration camps	Committed suicide bombing
Karl Gebhardt		November 23, 1897	June 2, 1948	50 years, 192 days	Oversaw human medical experimentation of concentration camp inmates at Ravensbrück and Auschwitz	Executed by hanging
Wilhelm Harster		July 21, 1904	December 25, 1991	87 years, 157 days	Commander of the Security Police (SiPo) and SD (Kraków, 1939–40; Netherlands, 1940–43; Italy, 1943–45). Responsible for the deaths of at least 104,000 Jews.	Arrested in 1945 and transferred to Dutch custody. Tried and sentenced to 12 years imprisonment in 1949; served six years; deported to West Germany in 1955. Arrested and tried in 1967. Sentenced to 15 years imprisonment, but sentence commuted and released in 1969.
Karl Frenzel		August 28, 1911	September 2, 1996	85 years, 5 days	Commandant of Camp I (forced labor camp) at Sobibor	Arrested on March 22, 1962; sentenced to life imprisonment on December 20, 1966; released on health grounds in 1982
Erich von dem Bach-Zelewski		March 1, 1899	March 8, 1972	73 years, 7 days	In charge of Nazi security warfare	Arrested in 1945; released in 1949; sentenced to 10 years imprisonment, which he served under house arrest; sentenced to 4.5 years imprisonment in 1958; sentenced to life imprisonment in 1961; died in prison in 1972
Herbert Backe		May 1, 1896	April 6, 1947	50 years, 340 days	Minister of Food and Agriculture, responsible for the Hunger Plan	Arrested; committed suicide by hanging
Hermann Fegelein		October 30, 1906	April 28, 1945	38 years, 180 days	Responsible for the Pripyat Marshes massacres	Executed by firing squad by Nazi Germany for desertion after trying to flee from Berlin in April 1945
Oskar Dirlewanger		September 26, 1895	June 7, 1945	49 years, 254 days	Commander of the Dirlewanger Brigade. This brigade is regarded as the worst Waffen-SS unit in Poland and Belarus and perhaps in modern European history. Helped quell the Warsaw Uprising along with Kaminski.	Arrested, then beaten to death by Polish guards while in custody
Bronislav Kaminski		June 16, 1899	August 28, 1944	45 years, 73 days	Commander of the collaborationist Russian People's Liberation Army Helped quell the Warsaw Uprising along with Dirlewanger.	Executed by firing squad by Nazi Germany after being court-martialed for looting
Jürgen Stroop		September 26, 1895	March 6, 1952	56 years, 162 days	Suppression and destruction of the Warsaw Ghetto Uprising	Executed by hanging
Ferdinand von Sammern-Frankenegg		March 17, 1897	September 20, 1944	47 years, 187 days	SS and Police Leader of the Warsaw area from 1941–43 Responsible for the Grossaktion Warsaw, the single most deadly operation against the Jews in the course of the Holocaust in occupied Poland, which entailed sending between 254,000 and 265,000 men, women and children aboard overcrowded Holocaust trains to Treblinka Leading figure in the destruction of the Warsaw Ghetto Uprising	Assassinated
Friedrich-Wilhelm Krüger		February 27, 1894	May 9, 1945	51 years, 71 days	Higher SS and Police Leader (HSPPF) in occupied Poland	Committed suicide
Wilhelm Koppe		June 15, 1896	July 2, 1975	79 years, 17 days	SS and Police Leader in Reichsgau Wartheland (September 1939 - October 1943) Supreme SS and Police Leader in General Government (October 1943 - 1945)	Died of natural causes
Friedrich Jeckeln		February 2, 1895	February 3, 1946	51 years, 1 day	Higher SS and Police Leader in Russia-South; Russia-North Responsible for Rumbula, Babi Yar, and Kamianets-Podilskyi massacres	Executed by hanging
Karl Eberhard Schöngarth		April 22, 1903	May 16, 1946	43 years, 24 days	Commanded multiple Einsatzgruppen units in Poland Commander of the BdS in the Netherlands (September 1944– May 1945)	Executed by hanging
Kurt Eberhard		September 12, 1874	September 8, 1947	72 years, 361 days	Military governor of German-occupied Kiev Responsible for the Babi Yar massacre	Arrested; committed suicide
Walter von Reichenau		October 8, 1884	January 17, 1942	57 years, 101 days	Issued the Severity Order Responsible for the Babi Yar and Bila Tserkva massacres	Died after having a stroke, then suffering injuries in a plane crash
Hans Krueger		July 1, 1909	February 8, 1988	78 years, 222 days	Commandant of the Stanisławów Ghetto Responsible for the Stanislawow Ghetto massacre	Arrested in 1945; released in 1948; re-arrested in 1962; sentenced to life imprisonment in 1968; released on health grounds in 1986; died in 1988
Hans-Adolf Prützmann		August 31, 1901	May 16, 1945	43 years, 258 days	Supreme SS and Police Leader of Ukraine Higher SS and Police Leader of Russia-North; Russia-South Oversaw the activities of the Einsatzgruppen detachments that perpetrated the Holocaust in the Baltic States and Ukraine	Committed suicide by cyanide poisoning while in Allied custody
Bruno Streckenbach		February 7, 1902	October 28, 1977	75 years, 263 days	Trained the Einsatzgruppen Commander of Einsatzgruppe I in Poland Supp	Served 10 years in Soviet custody, but never tried; released on October 10, 1955
Ludwig Hahn		January 23, 1908	November 10, 1986	78 years, 291 days	Commander of Einsatzkommando 1/I, Poland Suppression of the Warsaw Ghetto Uprising Suppression of the Warsaw Uprising	Arrested in 1960; released in 1961; briefly re-arrested in 1965 and 1966; arrested for the last time in 1972; sentenced to 12 years in prison in 1973; sentenced to life imprisonment in 1975; released on health grounds in 1983; died in 1986
Hans Biebow		December 18, 1902	June 23, 1947	45 years, 97 days	Chief of German administration of Litzmannstadt (Łódź) Ghetto	Executed by hanging
Karl Brunner		July 26, 1900	December 7, 1980	80 years, 134 days	Commander of Einsatzkommando 4/I, Poland	Never prosecuted
Emanuel Schäfer		April 20, 1900	December 4, 1974	74 years, 228 days	Commander of Einsatzgruppe II, Poland Commander of the BdS in Serbia, (January 6, 1942 – December 1944)	Sentenced to 21 months in prison by a denazification court in 1951; released in 1953. Sentenced to a further 6.5 years in prison in June 1953; released in 1956.
Friedrich Suhr		May 6, 1907	May 31, 1946	39 years, 25 days	Member of Gestapo Referat IVb (Jewish affairs) Commander of Sonderkommando 4b in Einsatzgruppe C, November 1942 - August 1943 Commander of Einsatzkommando 6, August 1943 - November 1943, Commander of SiPo and SD in occupied France, December 1943 - December 1944	Committed suicide in prison
Lothar Beutel		May 6, 1902	May 16, 1986	84 years, 10 days	Commander of Einsatzgruppe IV, Poland (1/2)	Served 10 years in Soviet custody, but never tried; released in October 1955. Arrested and charged in West Germany in 1965; released on bail in 1967; charges dropped in 1971; died in 1986.
Josef Albert Meisinger		September 14, 1899	March 7, 1947	47 years, 174 days	Commander of Einsatzgruppe IV, Poland (2/2); Commander of the state police in Warsaw	Executed by hanging
Ernst Damzog		October 30, 1882	July 24, 1945	62 years, 267 days	Commander of Einsatzgruppe V, Poland	Died under unclear circumstances
Gerhard Flesch		October 18, 1909	February 28, 1948	38 years, 133 days	Commander of Einsatzkommando 2/VI, Poland	Executed by firing squad
Franz Walther Stahlecker		October 10, 1900	March 23, 1942	41 years, 164 days	Commander of Einsatzgruppe A, Baltic states, June 22, 1941–March 23, 1942 (1/5)	Killed in action
Heinz Jost		July 9, 1904	November 12, 1964	60 years, 126 days	Commander of Einsatzgruppe A, Baltic states, March 29, 1942–September 2, 1942 (2/5)	Sentenced to life imprisonment in 1948; commuted to 10 years; released in December 1951; died in 1964
Humbert Achamer-Pifrader		November 21, 1900	April 25, 1945	44 years, 155 days	Commander of Einsatzgruppe A, Baltic states, September 10, 1942–September 4, 1943 (3/5)	Killed in air raid
Herbert Böttcher		April 24, 1907	June 12, 1950	43 years, 49 days	Last SS and Police Leader in District Radom in General Government, May 12, 1942 - January 16, 1945.	Executed by hanging
Friedrich Panzinger		February 1, 1903	August 8, 1959	56 years, 188 days	Commander of Einsatzgruppe A, Baltic states, September 5, 1943–May 6, 1944 (4/5); Last chief of the Kripo (2/2)	Arrested by the Soviets 1946, sentenced to 25 years in prison; released in 1955; re-arrested in 1959; committed suicide by poisoning
Wilhelm Fuchs		September 1, 1898	January 24, 1947	48 years, 145 days	Commander of Einsatzgruppe A, Baltic states, May 6, 1944–October 10, 1944 (5/5); Commander of Einsatzkommando 3, September 15, 1943–May 27, 1944; Commander of Einsatzgruppe E, Croatia, October 1944–November 1944 (3/3); Commander of the BdS in Serbia, (1941 – January 1942)	Executed by hanging
Eduard Strauch		August 17, 1906	September 15, 1955	49 years, 29 days	Commander of Einsatzkommando 2, Latvia, November 4, 1941–December 2, 1941 (2/6) Commander of Sonderkommando 1b, March 1942–August 1942 (3/4) Responsible for Rumbula massacre	Sentenced to death by an American military court in 1948, then transferred to Belgium, where he received another death sentence. Strauch was never executed and died in custody.
Rudolf Lange		April 18, 1910	February 23, 1945	34 years, 311 days	Commander of Einsatzkommando 2, Latvia, December 3, 1941–1944	Believed killed in action
Karl Jäger		September 20, 1888	June 22, 1959	70 years, 275 days	Commander of Einsatzkommando 3, Lithuania, June 1941–August 1, 1943	Discovered and arrested in 1959; committed suicide by hanging while awaiting trial
Hermann Schaper		August 12, 1911	deceased after 2002	over 90 years	Commander of Einsatzgruppe B, Poland	Arrested in 1964; released due to insufficient evidence
Arthur Nebe		November 13, 1894	March 21, 1945	50 years, 128 days	Commander of Einsatzgruppe B, Belarus, June 1941–November 1941 (1/5); Chief of the Kripo (1/2); President of Interpol	Executed by hanging by Nazi Germany for involvement in the 20 July plot
Erich Naumann		April 29, 1905	June 7, 1951	46 years, 40 days	Commander of Einsatzgruppe VI, Poland Commander of Einsatzgruppe B, Belarus, November 1941–March 1943 (2/5) Commander of the BdS in the Netherlands, September 1943–July 1944	Executed by hanging
Horst Böhme		August 24, 1909	April 10, 1945	35 years, 229 days	Lidice; Commander of Einsatzgruppe B, Belarus, March 12, 1943–August 28, 1943, August 12, 1944 (3/5) and (4/5) Commander of Einsatzgruppe C, north and central Ukraine, September 6, 1943–March 1944 (3/3)	Presumed killed in action in Königsberg (now Kaliningrad), East Prussia; officially declared dead in 1954
Erich Ehrlinger		October 14, 1910	July 31, 2004	93 years, 291 days	Commander of Einsatzgruppe B, Belarus, August 28, 1943–April 1944 (4/5); Commander of Sonderkommando 1b, June 1941–November 1941	Arrested in December 1958; sentenced to 12 years imprisonment
August von Meyszner		August 3, 1886	January 24, 1947	61 years,174 days	Commander of Orpo in occupied Norway 1940-1942 Higher SS and Police Leader in German-occupied territory of Serbia 1942-1944	Executed by hanging
Heinrich Seetzen		June 22, 1906	September 28, 1945	39 years, 98 days	Commander of Einsatzgruppe B, Belarus, April 28, 1944–August 1944 (5/5); Commander of Einsatzkommando 10a, Moldova, south Ukraine, the Crimea, and north Caucasus, June 1941–July 1942	Arrested in September 1945; committed suicide by cyanide poisoning
Otto Bradfisch		May 10, 1903	June 22, 1994	91 years, 43 days	Commander of Einsatzkommando 8, Belarus, June 1941–April 1, 1942	Arrested on April 21, 1958; sentenced to 13 years imprisonment in 1963; released in 1969; died in 1994
Otto Rasch		December 7, 1891	November 1, 1948	56 years, 330 days	Commander of Einsatzgruppe C, north and central Ukraine, June 1941–October 1941 (1/3) Responsible for the Babi Yar massacre	Arrested; removed from trial on health grounds in February 1948; died in November 1948
Paul Blobel		August 13, 1894	June 7, 1951	56 years, 298 days	Commander of Sonderkommando 4a, north and central Ukraine, June 1941–13 January 1942 (1/5), commander of the Sonderaktion 1005 project Responsible for the Babi Yar and Bila Tserkva massacres	Executed by hanging
Otto Ohlendorf		February 4, 1907	June 7, 1951	44 years, 124 days	Commander of Einsatzgruppe D, Moldova, south Ukraine, the Crimea, and north Caucasus, June 1941–July 1942 (1/2)	Executed by hanging
Walther Bierkamp		December 17, 1901	May 15, 1945	43 years, 149 days	Commander of Einsatzgruppe D, Moldova, south Ukraine, the Crimea, and north Caucasus, July 1942–March 1943 (2/2)	Committed suicide
Rolf Günther		January 8, 1913	August 1945	32 years	Deputy of Adolf Eichmann, head of section IV B4 a (Evacuations) of Gestapo, co-responsible for deportations of Jews from Salonika	Committed suicide by poisoning
Josef Witiska		July 5, 1894	October 16, 1946	52 years, 103 days	Commander of Einsatzgruppe H in Slovakia, September – November 1944 Commander of SiPo and SD (BdS), Slovakia, November 1944 – May 1945 Transported over 14,000 Slovaks to the death camps	Committed suicide by poisoning
Bruno Müller		September 13, 1905	March 1, 1960	54 years, 170 days	Commander of Einsatzkommando 2/I, Poland Commander of Einsatzkommando 11b, south Ukraine and the Crimea, July 1941–October 1941	Sentenced to 20 years in prison for unrelated crimes in 1948; released in 1953; died in 1960
Werner Braune		April 11, 1909	June 7, 1951	42 years, 58 days	Commander of Einsatzkommando 11b, south Ukraine and the Crimea, October 1941–September 1942	Executed by hanging
Rudolf Batz		November 10, 1903	February 8, 1961	57 years, 90 days	Commander of Einsatzkommando 2 Oversaw Einsatzgruppen killings in the Baltic States	Arrested; committed suicide by hanging while awaiting trial
Joachim Hamann		May 18, 1913	July 13, 1945	32 years, 56 days	Commander of Rollkommando Hamann, a small mobile unit established by him that murdered an estimated 60,000 Latvian Jews in massacres across occupied territory	Committed suicide
Ernst Girzick		October 17, 1911	March 4, 1977	65 years	Head of Central Office for the Settlement of the Jewish Question in Bohemia and Moravia, Member of Eichmann-Kommando in Budapest.	Sentenced to 15 years in prison in 1948; released in 1953; died in 1960
Franz Novak		January 10, 1913	October 21, 1983	70 years	Railway and transportation expert in Eichmann's Office of Jewish Affairs. Member of the Eichmann-kommando responsible for the deportation of Hungarian Jews.	Died of natural causes
Ernst Boepple		November 30, 1887	December 15, 1950	63 years, 15 days	Deputy to Josef Bühler and State Secretary in General Government in occupied Poland, co-responsible for the policy of terror, deportations to concentration camps and forced labor.	Executed by hanging
Gustav Lombard		April 10, 1895	September 18, 1992	97	Commander of 8th SS Cavalry Division Florian Geyer, in this position he took part in Pripyat Marshes massacres	Sentenced to 25 years in prison in 1947; released in 1955; died in 1992
Anton Burger		November 19, 1911	December 25, 1991	80 years	Judenreferent in Greece Commandant of Theresienstadt concentration camp July 3, 1943 - February 7, 1944	Died of natural causes
Wolfgang Birkner		October 27, 1913	March 24, 1945	31 years, 148 days	Commander of Kommando Bialystok, a small mobile unit which murdered at least 1,800 Polish Jews	Killed in action
Otto Wächter		July 8, 1901	July 14, 1949	48 years, 6 days	Governor of District of Kraków and District of Galicia in General Government	Died reportedly from kidney disease as a fugitive
Carl-Heinrich von Stülpnagel		January 2, 1886	August 30, 1944	58 years, 241 days	Ordered the mass deportations of Jews in France as a reprisal policy Collaborated with the Einsatzgruppen for reprisals against Jews in Ukraine	Executed by hanging by Nazi Germany for involvement in the 20 July plot
Hans Graf von Sponeck		February 12, 1888	July 23, 1944	56 years, 154 days	Collaborated with Einsatzgruppe D	Imprisoned by Nazi Germany after disobeying orders, then executed by firing squad in the aftermath of the 20 July plot
Eduard Wagner		April 1, 1894	July 23, 1944	50 years, 113 days	Drew up regulations that allowed German soldiers to take hostages from civilian population and execute them as response to resistance Drew up the regulations with Reinhard Heydrich to ensure the Wehrmacht's cooperation with the Einsatzgruppen in the murders of Soviet Jews Created and implemented deliberate starvation policies against Soviet prisoners of war	Committed suicide by gunshot in the aftermath of the 20 July plot
Maria Mandl		January 10, 1912	January 24, 1948	36 years, 14 days	Commandant of female camp at Auschwitz	Executed by hanging
Fritz Hartjenstein		July 3, 1905	October 20, 1954	49 years, 109 days	Commandant of Auschwitz-Birkenau Commandant of Natzweiler-Struthof, May 9, 1944 – January 1945	Sentenced to death in 1947, died awaiting execution
Johann Schwarzhuber		August 29, 1904	May 3, 1947	42 years, 247 days	Commandant of men's camp at Auschwitz, and selection of prisoners to be gassed at Auschwitz Commandant of Birkenau	Executed by hanging
Martin Weiss		February 21, 1903	September 30, 1984	81 years, 222 days	Commander of the Vilna Ghetto Commander of the Ypatingasis būrys killing squad, which was largely responsible for the Ponary massacre where approximately 100,000 people were shot, including 70,000 Jews.	Arrested in 1949; sentenced to life imprisonment in 1950; sentence suspended in 1971 and revoked in 1977; died in 1984
Eduard Roschmann		November 25, 1908	August 8, 1977	68 years, 256 days	Commandant of the Riga Ghetto	Arrested in 1945 but released early; fled to Argentina and subsequently escaped prosecution; died in 1977
Theodor Adrian von Renteln		September 15, 1897	October 24, 1960	63 years, 39 days	General Commissioner for Generalbezirk Litauen; Involved in the creation and destruction of the Kovno Ghetto and the Vilna Ghetto	Died of natural causes in Spain
Otto-Heinrich Drechsler		April 1, 1895	May 5, 1945	50 years, 34 days	General Commissioner for Generalbezirk Lettland for Nazi Germany's occupation regime (Reichskommissariat Ostland); Major figure in the establishment of the Riga Ghetto	Taken into British custody; committed suicide
Karl-Siegmund Litzmann		August 1, 1893	August 1945	52 years	General Commissioner for Generalbezirk Estland; Oversaw mass killings by the SS of most Estonian Jews	Reportedly died in unclear circumstances in August 1945; officially declared dead in July 1949
Wilhelm Kube		November 13, 1887	September 22, 1943	55 years, 313 days	General Commissioner for Generalbezirk Weißruthenien; Helped direct the Holocaust in Belarus including the liquidation of the Minsk Ghetto	Assassinated by a bomb planted by a Soviet partisan
Friedrich Buchardt		March 17, 1909	December 28, 1982	73 years	Commandant of Vorkomando Moskau, a section of Einsatzgruppe B, later worked in SD headquarters in occupied Łódź and again as commandant of Einsatzkommando 9, another section of Einsatzgruppe B operating near Vitebsk	Died of natural causes
Franz Murer		January 24, 1912	January 5, 1994	81 years, 346 days	Responsible for the establishment of the Vilna Ghetto, which hosted a population of about 55,000 Jews, none of whom survived after the war Effectively ruled the ghetto until July 23, shortly before its liquidation	Arrested in 1947 and deported to the Soviet Union in January 1948; sentenced to 25 years in hard labor; released in 1955 due to the Austrian State Treaty. Arrested and prosecuted again in 1963 due to the intervention of the famous Nazi hunter Simon Wiesenthal; acquitted on all charges and died in 1994.
Franz Josef Huber		January 22, 1902	January 30, 1975	73 years, 8 days	Inspector of SiPo (Security Police) and SD for Vienna, the "Upper" and "Lower Danube" regions; formal chief of the Central Agency for Jewish Emigration in Vienna. Responsible for the mass deportations of tens of thousands of Austrian Jews	Died in 1975 without being prosecuted for any crimes
Edmund Veesenmayer		November 12, 1904	December 23, 1977	73 years, 42 days	Reich plenipotentiary to Hungary after the occupation of the country Helped establish the Ustaše-led Independent State of Croatia Assisted in the deportations of 300,000 Hungarian Jews to Auschwitz	Arrested in 1945; sentenced to 20 years imprisonment in 1949; sentence commuted to 10 years imprisonment in 1951; released December, 1951; died in 1977
Jozef Tiso		October 13, 1887	April 18, 1947	59 years, 187 days	Leader of the State of Slovakia	Executed by hanging
Alexander Mach		October 11, 1902	October 15, 1980	78 years, 4 days	Head of the Hlinka Guard, one of the leading forces in the extermination of 68,000–71,000 Slovak Jews during the Holocaust in Slovakia	Sentenced to 30 years imprisonment; released in 1968; died in 1980
Vojtech Tuka		July 4, 1880	August 20, 1946	66 years, 47 days	Prime Minister and Minister of Foreign Affairs of the Slovak State Leading figure in the mass deportations of Slovak Jews to Nazi concentration camps	Executed by hanging
Ludwig Fischer		April 6, 1905	March 8, 1947	41 years, 336 days	Governor of the Warsaw District Responsible for the establishment of the Warsaw Ghetto, the largest ghetto ever built by the Nazis	Executed by hanging
Jakob Sporrenberg		September 16, 1902	December 6, 1952	50 years, 91 days	Oversaw and implemented Operation Harvest Festival	Executed by hanging
Albert Forster		July 26, 1902	February 28, 1952	49 years, 217 days	Reichsstatthalter and Gauleiter of Reichsgau Danzig-West Prussia Incited the massacres in Piaśnica	Executed by hanging
Arthur Greiser		January 22, 1897	July 21, 1946	49 years, 180 days	Reichsstatthalter and Gauleiter of Reichsgau Wartheland	Executed by hanging
Josef Bürckel		March 30, 1895	September 28, 1944	49 years, 182 days	Influential in the rise of the Nazi movement Responsible for the establishment of the Central Agency for Jewish Emigration in Vienna; Gauleiter of Vienna; Governor of the Vienna region Gauleiter of Gau Westmark	Died because of ill health
Ferdinand aus der Fünten		December 17, 1909	April 19, 1989	79 years, 123 days	Head of the Central Office for Jewish Emigration in Amsterdam	Sentenced to death in 1950, which was commuted to life in imprisonment in 1951; released on health grounds in 1989; died later that year
Erich Koch		June 19, 1896	November 12, 1986	90 years, 146 days	Gauleiter of East Prussia Chief of Civil Administration (Chef der Zivilverwaltung) of Bezirk Bialystok; Reich Commissioner for Ukraine (Reichskommissariat Ukraine)	Arrested by the British in 1949, and extradited to Poland in 1950. Sentenced to death in 1959, which was commuted to life imprisonment in 1960; died in prison in 1986.
Hinrich Lohse		September 2, 1896	February 25, 1964	67 years, 176 days	Gauleiter of Schleswig-Holstein Reich Commissioner for Ostland (Reichskommissariat Ostland)	Arrested by the British in 1945; sentenced to 10 years in prison in 1948; released due to ill health in 1951; died in 1964
Viktors Arājs		January 13, 1910	January 13, 1988	78 years	Leader of the Arajs Kommando, which murdered half of Latvia's Jewish population	Held in a British internment camp until 1949; evaded prosecution until 1979 when convicted for his involvement in the Rumbula massacre and sentenced to life imprisonment; died in prison in 1988.
Fritz Dietrich		August 6, 1898	October 22, 1948	50 years, 77 days	Commander of SS police in Liepāja Responsible for Liepāja massacres	Executed by hanging
Jonas Noreika		October 8, 1910	February 26, 1947	36 years, 141 days	Governor of Šiauliai district, August 1941 – February 1943 Oversaw deportations of Jews to the Šiauliai Ghetto; Responsible for Plungė massacre	Executed by shooting
Ion Antonescu		June 14, 1882	June 1, 1946	63 years, 352 days	Leader of Romania during World War II Responsible for the Odessa massacre, deportations to Transnistria, and the Iași pogrom	Executed by firing squad
Pierre Laval		June 28, 1883	October 15, 1945	62 years, 109 days	Prime Minister of Vichy France; Head of the Milice	Executed by firing squad
Philippe Pétain		April 24, 1856	July 23, 1951	95 years, 90 days	Chief of Vichy France	Sentenced to death in 1945, but had his sentence commuted to life imprisonment due to his World War I service and old age; died in custody in 1951
Benito Mussolini		July 29, 1883	April 28, 1945	61 years, 273 days	Prime Minister of Fascist Italy; Duce of the Italian Social Republic	Executed by firing squad
Vidkun Quisling		July 18, 1887	October 24, 1945	58 years, 98 days	Prime Minister of German-occupied Norway	Executed by firing squad
Josef Terboven		May 23, 1898	May 8, 1945	46 years, 350 days	Reichkommissar of German-occupied Norway	Committed suicide bombing
Werner Best		July 10, 1903	June 23, 1989	85 years, 348 days	Chief of Department 1 of the Gestapo; initiated a registry of all Jews in Germany Deputy to Reinhard Heydrich	Sentenced to death in 1948, later to 12 years imprisonment; released in 1951; held in detention in 1958 and charged again of war crimes in 1972; died in 1989 without serving time in prison a second time
Guido Buffarini Guidi		August 17, 1895	July 10, 1945	49 years, 327 days	Minister of the Interior of the Italian Social Republic; Issued RSI Police Order No. 5	Executed by firing squad
Gustav Simon		August 2, 1900	December 18, 1945	45 years, 138 days	Chief of German-occupied Luxembourg	Arrested; committed suicide by hanging
Kurt Lischka		August 16, 1909	May 16, 1989	79 years, 273 days	Chief of the Gestapo and commander of the SiPo and the SD in Paris Responsible of the single largest mass deportation of French Jews in Occupied France	Sentenced in 1980 to ten years imprisonment; released early on health grounds and died in 1989
Enno Lolling		June 19, 1888	May 27, 1945	56 years, 342 days	Chief medical officer of all SS concentration camps. Involved in human experimentation	Committed suicide
Ferenc Szálasi		January 6, 1897	March 12, 1946	49 years, 65 days	Leader of the Hungarian Government of National Unity from 1944-1945. Deported tens of thousands of Jews to Nazi concentration camps	Executed by hanging
