= Günther Herrmann =

Günther Herrmann may refer to:

- Günther Herrmann (footballer) (born 1939), German football player
- Günther Herrmann (SS commander) (1908−2004), Nazi German functionary and convicted criminal

== See also ==
- Günter Hermann (born 1960), German football manager
- Günter Herrmann (1934–2012), German footballer who represented Saarland
- Gunther Hermann, character from the Deus Ex video game
