= Johannes Thümmler =

German jurist and torturer

Johannes Hermann Thümmler, also Hans Thümmler, (born 23 August 1906 in Chemnitz; died 28 April 2002 in Eriskirch) was a German Obersturmbannführer and Senior Government, Head of the Gestapo Chemnitz and Katowice, as well as leader of commando 16 group D Einsatzgruppen in Croatia.

== Life ==
=== Years up to 1945 ===
Johannes Thümmler was born on 23 August 1906 in Chemnitz, the son of publisher and bookseller Hermann Thümmler. He studied law and graduated as a jurist. In 1932 Thümmler joined the NSDAP (member NR. 1,425,547), in 1933 the SA and 1937 the SS (member NR. 323 711). After the "seizure of power" by the Nazis, Thümmler initially worked at police headquarter Dresden and in Schwarzenberg. Soon after, he was appointed deputy head of the Gestapo Dresden. In January 1941 he was head of the Gestapo Dresden, in March 1941, he became head of the Gestapo in Chemnitz, succeeding Rudolf Mildner. On 20 April 1943 he was promoted to Obersturmbannführer.

From 3 July 1943 to 11 September 1943 Thümmler led the Einsatzkommando 16 of Einsatzgruppe D in Croatia, based in Knin. In September 1943 Thümmler returned and was again, following Mildner, appointed head of the Gestapo and the commander of the state police and the SD (KdS) in Katowice, Upper Silesia. In this capacity, he also took over the leadership of the SS court martial for Upper Silesia with the administrative districts of Katowice and Opole. This court martial convened in Block 11 of the main camp of Auschwitz. After the conquest of the territories by the Red Army and the withdrawal of German troops, Thümmler took over at Easter 1945 for the last time a function at the KdS in Stuttgart.

=== Post war ===
After the war, Thümmler was initially in French captivity; in 1946 he was transferred to the detention center Ludwigsburg. At the detention center, he was the mayor of the camp self-government. In the denazification he was classified in 1948 as "major offender" and sentenced to two and a half years of forced labor. The internment was credited to the sentence, therefore Thümmler was released in the same year. In an appeal hearing the punishment of Thümmler was decreased in 1949 to 180 days in labor camps and inclusion in the group of "tainted". In October 1948, he took on a job in the optical factory Zeiss Württemberg Oberkochen.

=== Auschwitz trial ===
On 2 November 1964 Thümmler said as a witness in the Frankfurt Auschwitz Trial to stand trial in Auschwitz. He stated that "several hundred" death sentences have been pronounced by the state court. In 60% of cases, the death penalty had been pronounced, in other cases, a perpetual KZ-briefing. "An acquittal was virtually eliminated. In my days, there was no innocent, "said Thümmler in his testimony. "We asked the accused if they agree, and they all said yes, yes." The Court consisted of him as chairman and one representative of the Judicial Police and the SD as assessor. As a defender, an official of his department had acted when - what was rarely happened - the accused had requested for a defender. He had determined the composition of the court and the person of the prosecutor and the defense. According to the findings of the court, it was with the accused to civilians who had been arrested by the Gestapo in Katowice. The arrests were made for alleged resistance activities and criminal activities such as smuggling, courier services or listening to enemy broadcasts. The trial lasted rarely longer than two minutes; basis of the judgments were the previous "confessions" of the defendants. As a witness in Frankfurt, Thümmler told that he had not heard or known whether the "confessions" were made in "rigorous interrogations". Such interrogation methods by the Gestapo were associated with abuse. Investigation against Thümmler did not lead to a conviction: 1970 rejected the district court Ellwangen the opening of main proceedings from. Violation of the law lies with the state court proceedings in Auschwitz not before, since the accused had signed confessions, the court said. Another method of murder was set in 1999 by the head of the Central Office for the Prosecution of Nazi Crimes in Ludwigsburg, chief prosecutor Kurt Schrimm, for lack of evidence.

=== Later life ===
Thümmler was a member of the Protestant Academy Tutzing. 1996 demanded Thümmler from the city of Chemnitz, the return of works of art that had come after the war in the urban area. In the final phase of World War II Thümmlers art had been swapped with museum pieces to the Ore Mountains. The city of Chemnitz refused to return recalling Thümmlers Nazi past. The legal basis was the order no. 124 of the Soviet Military Administration in Germany (SMAD) on the confiscation of assets of Nazi and war criminals of 1946 and the future reference is participating plebiscite in Saxony on 30 June 1946.
