= Franz Six =

German Nazi official (1909–1975)

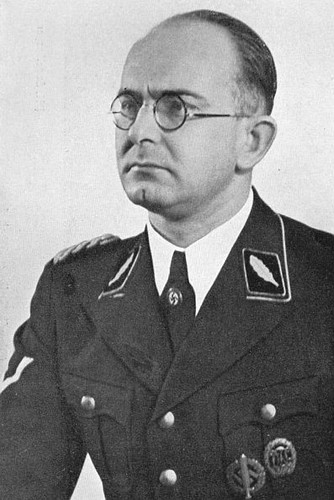
- 1940/1941
- Born: 12 August 1909; Mannheim, German Empire
- Died: 9 July 1975 (aged 65); Bolzano, Italy
- Status: Deceased
- Motive: Nazism
- Convictions: Crimes against humanity War crimes Membership in a criminal organization
- Trial: Einsatzgruppen trial
- Penalty: 20 years imprisonment; commuted to 10 years imprisonment

Details
- Victims: 144+ (as an accomplice)
- Span of crimes: 20 June 1941 – 20 August 1941
- Country: Soviet Union
- Military career
- Allegiance: Nazi Germany
- Branch: Allgemeine SS
- Service years: 1930–1945
- Rank: SS-Brigadeführer
- Unit: Einsatzgruppe B
- Commands: SS Division Das Reich; Vorkommando Moskau
- Conflicts: World War II

Franz Alfred Six (12 August 1909 – 9 July 1975) was a Nazi official, promoter of the Holocaust and convicted war criminal. He was appointed by Reinhard Heydrich to head department Amt VII, Written Records of the Reich Security Main Office (RSHA). In 1940, he was appointed to direct state police operations in an occupied United Kingdom following invasion. In the post-war period, he worked as a public relations executive and a management consultant.

== Academic career ==
Franz Six completed his classical high school in 1930, and proceeded to the University of Heidelberg to study journalism, sociology and politics. His late graduation was due to the fact he had to drop out of school from time to time to earn the money needed to graduate. He graduated with a degree of doctor in philosophy in 1934. In 1936, Six earned the high degree of doctor, and became a professor of journalism at the University of Königsberg where he also took up the position of press director for the German Student's Association. By 1939, he had become chair for Foreign Political Science at the university of Berlin and was its first dean of the faculty for foreign countries.

== Nazi official ==
In 1930, Six joined the Nazi Party as member number 245,670. In 1932 he became a member and student organizer for the Sturmabteilung – or SA (Storm Troopers). In 1935 Six joined the SS (membership number 107,480) as an officer of the Sicherheitsdienst (SD), the intelligence agency of both the SS and Nazi Party. Impressed by his academic achievements and curriculum vitae, Reinhard Heydrich appointed Six head of Amt VII, Written Records of the Reich Security Main Office (RSHA), which dealt mainly with ideological issues and publications. Six's responsibilities included the creation of antisemitic, anti-Masonic propaganda, the sounding of public opinion, and the monitoring of Nazi indoctrination of the public. He held this post until 1943 when he was succeeded by Paul Dittel.

On 17 September 1940, the same day on which Hitler indefinitely postponed the idea of an invasion of Great Britain, Heydrich charged Six to form death squads to eliminate anti-Nazi elements in Britain following a successful invasion by the Wehrmacht. Six was slated to become the SD-Commander in the country, with his headquarters to be located in London, and with regional task forces in Birmingham, Liverpool, Manchester, and Edinburgh. His immediate mission would have been to hunt down and arrest some 2,820 people listed in the Sonderfahndungsliste G.B. ('Special Search List Great Britain'). This document, which post-war became known as "The Black Book", was a secret list previously compiled by Walter Schellenberg, Chief of RSHA Amt VI, Ausland-SD, that made up the foreign intelligence branch of the SD. The list contained the names of prominent British residents to be arrested immediately after a successful invasion. The list included British politicians and celebrities, such as Winston Churchill and other members of the Cabinet, Noël Coward, Sigmund Freud (even though he had died in September 1939), the philosopher Bertrand Russell, members of exiled governments, financiers such as Bernard Baruch, and many others deemed anti-Nazi. A separate list named organizations which would have to be dismantled as well, namely the Freemasons, the Jehovah's Witnesses and even the Boy Scouts. Six would also have been responsible for handling the population of 300,000 British Jews.

== Einsatzgruppen ==
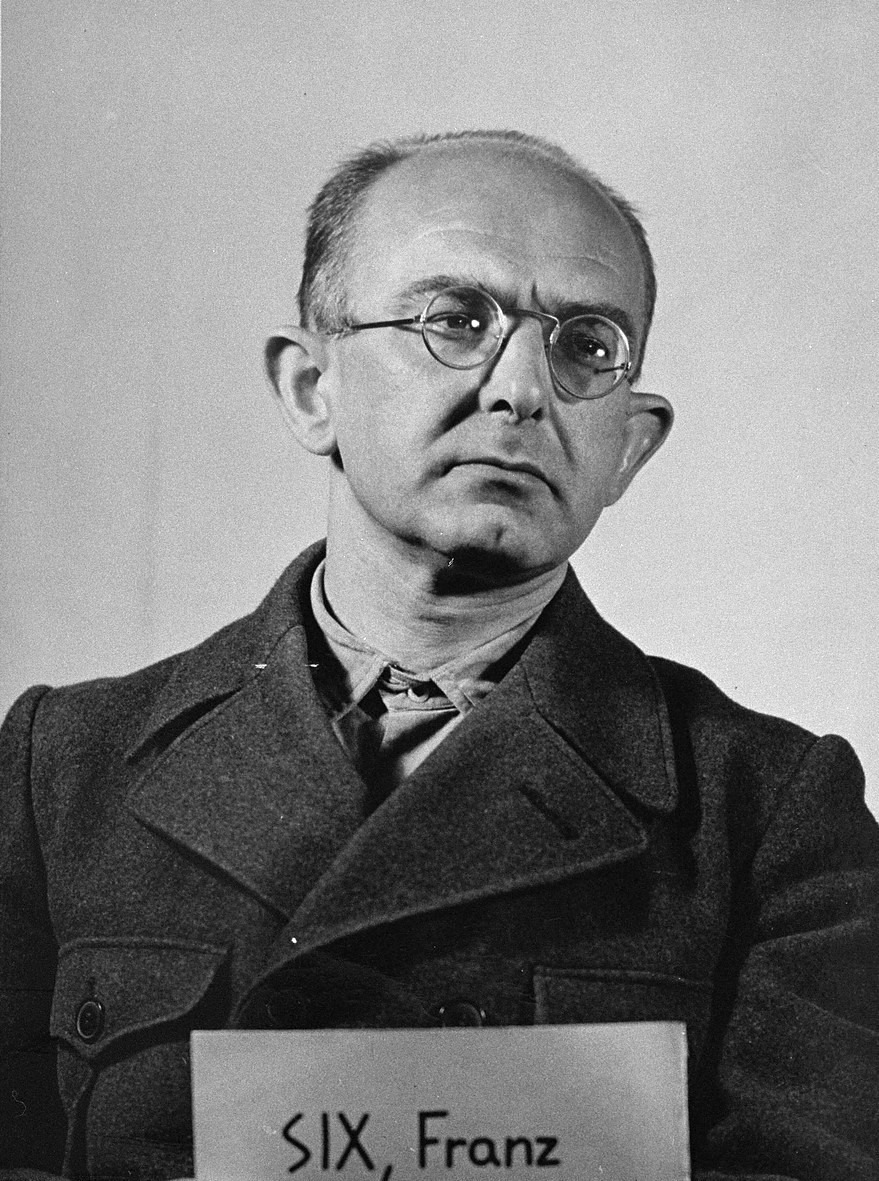
Six at the Nuremberg Trials in 1948

After Hitler gave up on his attempts to invade Great Britain and Six's planned role never being realized, Six was on 20 June 1941 assigned as chief of Vorkommando Moskau, a unit of Einsatzgruppe B in the Soviet Union. During this command, Six's Kommando reported "liquidating" 144 persons. The report claimed "The Vorkommando Moscow was forced to execute another 46 persons, amongst them 38 intellectual Jews who had tried to create unrest and discontent in the newly established Ghetto of Smolensk." He was promoted by Heinrich Himmler on 9 November 1941 to SS-Oberführer for exceptional service in the Einsatz. On 31 January 1945, he was again promoted to SS-Brigadeführer.

After the war, Six was tried as a war criminal in the Einsatzgruppen Trial at Nuremberg in 1948. During his trial, he admitted that the executions of women and children was wrong, but the killing of male Jews was justified, since they could bear arms.

Unable to link him directly to any atrocities committed by Vorkommando Moskau, the court instead found Six guilty on all counts for forming the organization, then sentenced him to 20 years' imprisonment. A clemency court commuted this sentence to 10 years, and he was released in October 1952. He served about 7.5 years from his arrest to his release. CIA files suggest Six joined the Gehlen Organization, the forerunner to the Bundesnachrichtendienst, in the 1950s. Six was also a member of the Naumann Circle, which aimed to infiltrate the Free Democratic Party and eventually restore Nazism in Germany.

== Later years ==
Franz Six retired to Friedrichshafen in southern Germany. He worked as a publicity/advertising executive for Porsche.

Six was called as one of four witnesses by defense attorney Robert Servatius in the 1961 trial in Israel of Adolf Eichmann, and gave his testimony by deposition in West Germany. Servatius had wanted to have Six appear in person, but Prosecutor Gideon Hausner stated that the former Nazi general would be subject to arrest, trial and execution as a war criminal.

Franz Six died in 1975.
