= Friedrich Suhr =

German lawyer and SS-Obersturmbannführer (1907–1946)

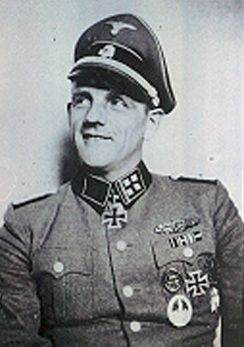
- Suhr in a photograph after 11 December 1944, wearing the Knight's Cross of the Iron Cross
- Born: 6 May 1907; Lüneburg, Province of Hanover, Kingdom of Prussia, German Empire
- Died: 31 May 1946 (aged 39); Bendahl Prison, Wuppertal, Allied-occupied Germany
- Military career
- Allegiance: Nazi Germany
- Branch: Schutzstaffel
- Service years: 1933–1945
- Rank: SS-Obersturmbannführer
- Unit: Einsatzgruppe C
- Commands: Sonderkommando 4b Einsatzkommando 6 Commander of SiPo & SD, France; SS and Police Leader, "Oberelsaß"
- Conflicts: World War II
- Awards: Knight's Cross of the Iron Cross; Iron Cross, 1st and 2nd class War Merit Cross, 2nd class with Swords

Friedrich Suhr (6 May 1907 – 31 May 1946) was a German lawyer and SS-Obersturmbannführer. He worked in the Reich Security Main Office under Adolf Eichmann. During the Second World War, he led Einsatzkommando death squads in Ukraine. He also served as the SiPo and SD commander in occupied France and was the SS and Police Leader in Oberelsaß (Upper Alsace). After the war, he committed suicide while in Allied custody.

== Early life ==
Suhr was born in Lüneburg and pursued a legal career at the University of Göttingen and the University of Freiburg, receiving a Doctor of Law degree. He joined the SS (membership number 65,824) on 1 February 1933, and the Nazi Party on 1 May 1933 (member number 2,623,241). He practiced law and, after the Nazi seizure of power, he was made a Government Counselor (Regierungsrat).

== Work in the SS legal bureaucracy ==
Suhr was commissioned an SS-Hauptsturmführer in the Sicherheitspolizei (Security Police, or SiPo) on 9 November 1938. He served as a legal consultant to the SiPo Commandant in Prague from July 1939 to May 1940, being promoted to SS-Sturmbannführer on 10 September 1939. He then was posted to SS-Obergruppenführer Reinhard Heydrich's Reich Security Main Office (RSHA) at SS headquarters in Berlin. Working in its Organization, Administration, and Law Office (Amt II), Suhr headed Section II 3A (Judicial Affairs and Damage Claims). From July 1941 to November 1942, Suhr was transferred to the Gestapo Office (Amt IV). Here, he was assigned to the legal matters section in SS-Obersturmbannführer Adolf Eichmann's Referat IV B4. (Jewish Affairs and Deportations). Suhr worked on issues related to the confiscation and sale of property expropriated from Jewish deportees. The following illustrates his actions in this regard:

On November 25, 1941, the Eleventh Ordinance of the Reich Citizenship Law was promulgated. It stated that Jews leaving Germany were to be stripped of their citizenship and their property transferred to the Reich ... On December 3, 1941, Suhr signed a circular referring to this question that was forwarded to all RSHA stations. He explained that the operations would be financed by a special "W" bank account (a so-called W-Sonderkonto), and it was necessary to verify that every Jew would contribute at least one-quarter of all assets to this account ... At the end of February 1942, Suhr signed an additional circular on assets ... the circular's purpose was to reiterate and make doubly sure that all Jewish assets would be seized before expulsion. All Jews were obliged to complete with care a standard assets’ declaration to cover all possessions except for the small amount of property the deportee would take with him or her at departure. ... Every Jew was to take along ℛℳ 50 – no more, no less. If an indigent Jew did not have this amount at his or her disposal, it was to be collected from another, more affluent deportee. According to the Eleventh Ordinance, Jews were stripped of their citizenship as soon as they crossed over the border; their assets then passed to the hands of the Reich.

After the Wannsee Conference of 20 January 1942 that planned the implementation of the Final Solution, Suhr took part in a follow-up meeting held at the Reich Ministry for the Occupied Eastern Territories on 29 January. This meeting defined who would be considered a Jew for deportation to the extermination camps in the eastern occupied territories where they would be murdered. It was decided that Jews married to non-Jews would be included in the category for deportation, along with the children of such mixed marriages.

== Second World War and the Holocaust ==
In November 1942, Suhr was transferred to Einsatzgruppe C, which was attached to Army Group South operating in northern Ukraine. He was made the commander of SS-Sonderkommando 4b. Suhr headed this unit until 5 August 1943 and then took over Einsatzkommando 6 until November 1943. These were special death squads whose function was to exterminate Jews, political commissars, members of the NKVD, Soviet partisans and any other so-called "undesirable elements." These two units were estimated to have murdered a total of 6,329 persons and 5,577 persons, respectively, during their campaigns.

In December 1943, Suhr left Ukraine for Paris and was appointed Befehlshaber der Sicherheitspolizei und des SD (Commander of the SiPo and the SD), which included the Gestapo, for all of occupied France. He subsequently was promoted to SS-Obersturmbannführer on 20 April 1944. His duties involved anti-partisan warfare and fighting the French Resistance. He led the eponymous Kampfgruppe (Combat Group) "Suhr" and was awarded the Knight's Cross of the Iron Cross for valor on 11 December 1944. On 1 December 1944, he was named SS and Police Leader (SSPF) "Oberelsaß" (Upper Alsace). In this post, Suhr commanded all SS personnel and police in his jurisdiction, not only the SiPo and SD, but also the Ordnungspolizei (Orpo; regular uniformed police). He remained in that position until the area was overrun by American and Free French forces in early February 1945. After the end of the war in Europe, Suhr was arrested and interned. He killed himself on 31 May 1946 in the prison at Wuppertal.

== SS ranks ==
Date	Rank
9 November 1938	SS-Hauptsturmführer
10 September 1939	SS-Sturmbannführer
20 April 1944	SS-Obersturmbannführer

== See also ==
- The Holocaust in Ukraine

== Sources ==
- Headland, Ronald (1992). Messages of Murder: A Study of the Reports of the Einsatzgruppen of the Security Police and the Security Service, 1941-1943. Vancouver: Fairleigh Dickinson University Press. ISBN 978-0-838-63418-9.
- Klee, Ernst (2007). Das Personenlexikon zum Dritten Reich. Wer war was vor und nach 1945. Frankfurt-am-Main: Fischer-Taschenbuch-Verlag. ISBN 978-3-596-16048-8.
- Piper, Ernst (2005). Alfred Rosenberg. Hitlers Chefideologe. München: Blessing Karl Verlag. ISBN 3-89667-148-0.
- Williamson, Gordon (1994). The SS:Hitler's Instrument of Terror. Amber Books. ISBN 978-1-907-44656-6.
- Yerger, Mark C. (1997). Allgemeine-SS: The Commands, Units and Leaders of the General SS. Schiffer Publishing Ltd. ISBN 0-7643-0145-4.
