= Friedrich Buchardt =

German SS officer (1909–1982)

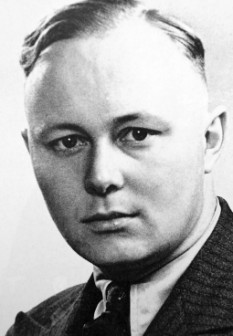
Friedrich Buchardt

Friedrich Buchardt (17 March 1909 in Riga – 20 December 1982 in Nußloch) was a Baltic German SS functionary who commanded Vorkommando Moskau, one of the divisions of Einsatzgruppe B. Post-war, he worked for MI6 (until 1947) and then, presumably, for the CIA. Buchardt was never prosecuted, being one of the agents of more sinister reputation used by the West after the war.

== Studies and 1930s ==
Of Baltic German origin, Buchardt studied at the German Gymnasium in Riga, Latvia and law at the University of Berlin and University of Jena. His thesis was titled "The Rights of National Minorities in Latvia and Its International Importance and Administration". He joined the SA in October 1933, but left the following year, finding it to be too plebeian.

Having completed his studies, Buchardt returned to Riga, where he tried to organize a national German-Baltic movement under the leadership of Erhard Kroeger. Buchardt funded and contributed to the pro-Nazi newspaper Rigaschen Rundschau, which was closed by the Latvian authorities in May 1934 because it had too many connections with Nazi Germany. This plunged Buchardt into financial difficulties, so he became a lawyer for a marketing company in Germany, and then the economics head of the Baltic Institute.

== SS career ==
While working at the University of Königsberg, he met Franz Six, the future leader of Vorkommando Moskau. On Six's advice, Buchardt was recruited by the Sicherheitsdienst (SD, the SS intelligence service), working under Six's command. He studied the topography and economy of the Soviet Union, and the distribution of Jews who lived there. By the late 1930s, he held a prestigious position at the Wannsee Institut, the German center for studies of the Soviet Union.

By the time of the invasion of Poland, the 30-year-old Buchardt was an Obersturmführer and the head of a small group of German-Baltic SS officers deployed to the Port of Gdynia to loot its archives, museums and libraries. The following year, he was assigned to the Office for the Resettlement of Poles and Jews in Poznań, where he classified the level of "Germanicness" of various sectors of the Polish population on a scale of 1 to 5.

In 1940, Buchardt was promoted to head of the SD in Lublin, where he worked under Odilo Globocnik and began participating directly in the Holocaust. Buchardt carried out similar work in Łódź in February 1941, this time reporting directly to the Reich Security Main Office.

On the eve of Operation Barbarossa (June 1941), Buchardt was recalled and, in order to have "blood experience" rather than merely be a "desk scholar", he was assigned to Vorkommando Moskau of Einsatzgruppe B. He served as the liaison officer between Franz Six and the head of Einsatzgruppe B, Arthur Nebe. Following the start of the offensive against Moscow in October 1941, he was promoted to head of Vorkommando Moskau the following month.

When the Red Army repelled the assault against Moscow, Buchardt was posted back to Łódź in January 1942, where he continued his work as head of the local SD. From January to September 1942, he supervised the deportation of about 80,000 Jews and Romanis to Chełmno extermination camp.

In February 1943, Buchardt succeeded Wilhelm Wiebens as commander of Einsatzkommando 9 of Einsatzgruppe B. He was in charge of murder actions near Vitebsk. Buchardt's unit was likely responsible for tens of thousands of victims. Buchardt was awarded the Iron Cross First Class and the War Merit Cross. In June 1944, he was promoted to Obersturmbannführer.

Posted to Berlin, Buchardt now headed Amt III B 2 of the RSHA, which specialized in racial and ethnic matters. He was under the command of Otto Ohlendorf, who headed Amt III. From December 1944, Buchardt also headed Sonderkommando Ost, which gathered intelligence on Russian personnel living in German territory, including members of General Andrey Vlasov's collaborationist Russian Liberation Army.

== After the war ==
With defeat imminent by April 1945, the head, Otto Ohlendorf, had set up an SD underground movement called Bundschuh (Tied Shoe), named after the Bundschuh movement. The Bundschuh was to serve as a Europe-wide information network of "high-grade" agents that could be used by sabotage and terrorist organizations as they waged a guerrilla war against the Allies. Ohlendorf appointed Buchardt as leader of the southeastern sector of the network, and he was sent to Karlsbad. However, the events of the war moved too quickly for the Bundschuh plotters, and Buchardt had to retreat 200 miles to the Austrian-German border. Shortly after the war, he was captured by American troops and transferred to the British, who held him at the POW camp in Rimini.

During his detention, Buchardt produced a document entitled "The Handling of the Russian Problem during the Period of the Nazi Regime in Germany", which detailed his espionage activities in Eastern Europe and emphasized the importance of native collaborators in SS operations. The document, which laid the groundwork for MI6 operations in Eastern Europe, allowed Buchardt to escape justice and be employed by MI6.

In 1947, MI6 dropped Buchardt, who then offered his services to the United States. Presumably, according to Guy Walters (2009), the United States accepted. A March 1950 report by the U.S. Counterintelligence Corps (CIC) noted that Buchardt "may be presently employed by an American intelligence agency", presumably the CIA. The CIC report was created to warn United States European Command (EUCOM) of a possible trial being brought against Buchardt by the Bavarian Land Indemnity Office. Buchardt was never brought to trial for any of his crimes.

Friedrich Buchardt can be regarded as the most murderous Nazi employed by the Allies after the war. He lived out most of his days in Heidelberg and died quietly in Nußbach on 20 December 1982.

== Bibliography ==
- Matthias Schröder: Deutschbaltische SS-Führer und Andrej Vlasov 1942–1945: „Rußland kann nur von Russen besiegt werden“: Erhard Kroeger, Friedrich Buchardt und die „Russische Befreiungsarmee“. Schöningh Verlag, Paderborn/Wien/Zürich 2003 (2nd edition), 256 pages, Register, photography.
- Ernst Klee: Das Personenlexikon zum Dritten Reich. Fischer, Frankfurt am Main 2007. ISBN 978-3-596-16048-8. (updated 2nd edition)
- Guy Walters, Hunting Evil: The Nazi War Criminals Who Escaped and the Quest to Bring Them to Justice (2009), ISBN 9780593059913
