= Rudolf Batz =

German SS officer (1903–1961)

- Born: 10 November 1903; Bad Langensalza, Thuringia, German Empire
- Died: 8 February 1961 (aged 57); Wuppertal, North Rhine-Westphalia, West Germany
- Cause of death: Suicide by hanging
- Military career
- Allegiance: Nazi Germany
- Branch: Allgemeine-SS
- Service years: 1935–1945
- Rank: SS-Standartenführer
- Unit: Gestapo
- Commands: Gestapo Chief, Hanover; Commander, Einsatzkommando 2 Kommandeur der Sicherheitspolizei und des SD, Kraków; Inspekteur der Sicherheitspolizei und des SD, Wehrkreis VI
- Conflicts: World War II
- Awards: War Merit Cross, 1st and 2nd class with swords

Rudolf Christoph Batz (10 November 1903 – 8 February 1961) was a German lawyer and a Schutzstaffel (SS) police official during the Nazi era, who rose to the rank of SS-Standartenführer. From 1 July to 4 November 1941, he was the commander of Einsatzkommando 2 and was responsible for the mass murder of Jews and others in the Baltic states. He also commanded security police and security service forces in Poland and in Germany, where he organized mass deportations of Jews to extermination camps. After the end of the Second World War, Batz lived undetected for many years but was arrested in 1960 and committed suicide while in custody awaiting trial.

== Early life ==
Batz was born in Bad Langensalza in Thuringia. He obtained his Abitur in Hanover in 1922. After working for several years, he returned to school to study law at the Ludwig-Maximilians-Universität München and the University of Göttingen. He passed his Assessor examination in 1934 and became a lawyer. He joined the Nazi Party (membership number 2,955,905) on 1 May 1933.

Batz joined the Schutzstaffel (SS) on 10 December 1935 (SS number 272,458) and was assigned as a legal consultant at the Gestapo headquarters in Berlin. In June 1936, he took over as the deputy chief of the Staatspolizeileitstelle (state police main office) in Breslau (today, Wrocław) and, from the beginning of October 1936, he also worked as a political advisor to the provincial government in Breslau. From mid-July 1939, he headed the Staatspolizeileitstelle in Linz and, from December 1939, in Hanover. Batz was promoted to SS-Sturmbannführer in 1940. Batz also served as a Regierungsrat (government councilor).

== Wartime Holocaust involvement ==
After the conquest of The Netherlands in the Second World War, he was temporarily deployed to The Hague from mid-October 1940 to early January 1941 with the Sicherheitspolizei (security police). He returned to his post in Hanover until the beginning of the German invasion of the Soviet Union in June 1941. He was selected as the commander of a unit of about 40 men, Einsatzkommando 2 of Einsatzgruppe A, and was responsible for overseeing the mass killing of the Jews, Romani people, communists, and the mentally ill of the Baltic states, primarily in Latvia.

Batz and his troops entered Riga and arrested 600 communists and 2,000 Jews. Another 1,600 Jews were hunted down and killed in other surrounding areas. By the end of October 1941, it is estimated that his Einsatzkommando killed 31,598 people. In August, he and his deputy had reported to SS-Brigadeführer Walter Stahlecker, the commander of Einsatzgruppe A, that they and their men had attained a death toll two or three times that of other units, who they complained were not "pulling their weight". Batz was succeeded as commander of the Einsatzkommando by Eduard Strauch on 4 November 1941. He returned to his permanent duty station in Hanover and was promoted to SS-Obersturmbannführer on 9 November 1942. In September 1943, Batz returned to the east as Kommandeur der Sicherheitspolizei und des SD (KdS) in Kraków. His chief assignments there were to combat Polish resistance units and to organize deportations of Jews to extermination camps. By November, he was back at the head of the Gestapo in Hanover and engaged in deportations of the region's Jews. On 30 January 1945, he was promoted to the rank of SS-Standartenführer. From 2 February 1945 until Germany's surrender, Batz served as the last Inspekteur der Sicherheitspolizei und des SD (IdS) for Wehrkreis (military district) VI, headquartered in Düsseldorf. His duties included control and punishment of forced laborers and internal anti-Nazi opposition. Under his command, hundreds were murdered.

== Post-war life and death ==
After the war, Batz lived undetected in West Germany under an assumed name for fifteen years. He was discovered and arrested in Dortmund on 11 November 1960 for the murder of 230 resistance fighters and forced laborers. Batz hanged himself in custody while awaiting trial.

== Sources ==
- Bartrop, Paul R.; Grimm, Eve E. (2019). Perpetrating the Holocaust: Leaders, Enablers, and Collaborators. ABC-CLIO. ISBN 978-1-440-85896-3.
- Klee, Ernst (2007). Das Personenlexikon zum Dritten Reich. Wer war was vor und nach 1945. Frankfurt-am-Main: Fischer-Taschenbuch-Verlag. ISBN 978-3-596-16048-8.
- Rudolf Batz in Land Oberösterreich, Geschichte und Geografie (in German)
- Short biography of Rudolf Batz at (in Italian)
