= Vitebsk Ghetto =

Ghetto in Nazi-occupied Belarus

Coordinates: 55.1140°N 30.1150°E

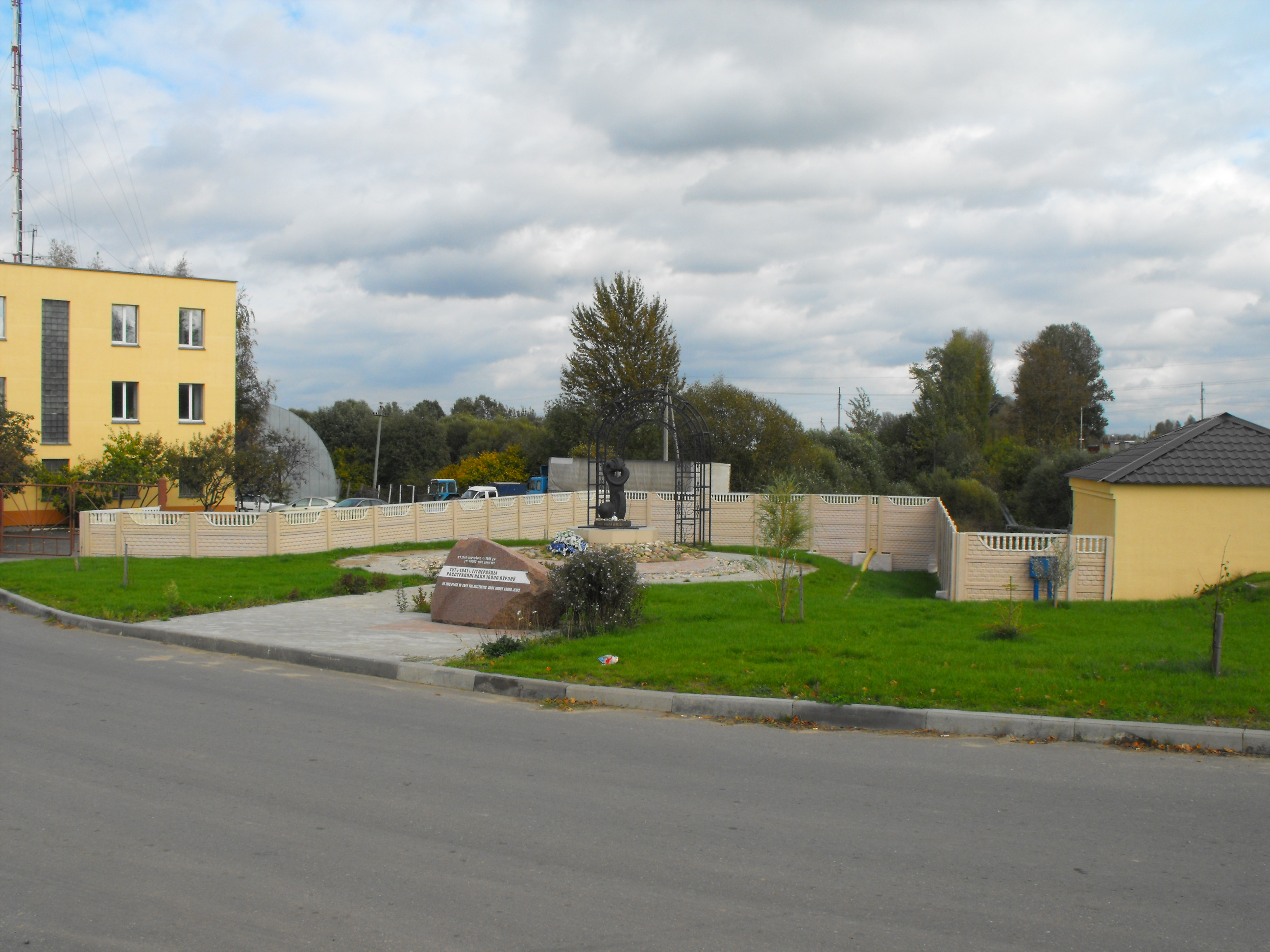
Present-day memorial on the site of the ghetto

Vitebsk Ghetto or Witebsk Ghetto was a short-lived ghetto in the town of Vitebsk in modern-day Belarus. It was created soon after the German invasion of the Soviet Union; immediately after the Nazis took control of the town on 11 July 1941.

Approximately 16,000 Jews lived in the ghetto. In October, the Nazi administrators declared that the poor conditions in the ghetto created a health hazard for local inhabitants and that an epidemic had started in the ghetto; in fact, this declaration was a pretext to move and massacre the Jews. Less than three months later, on 8 October 1941, the Nazis started a massacre of the Vitebsk Jews, which ended on 11 October with the deaths of most of the ghetto's inhabitants (sources vary as to the exact number). Many bodies were disposed in the nearby Vitba river.

== See also ==
- The Holocaust in Belarus
