= Ivankov =

Ivankov (Bulgarian: Иванков, Russian: Иванков or Иванько́в) is a surname that may refer to:

- Dimitar Ivankov (born 1975), Bulgarian footballer
- Ivan Ivankov (born 1975), Belarusian artistic gymnast
- Vyacheslav Ivankov (1940–2009), Soviet and Russian mafioso
- Viktor Ivankov (1924–2021), Soviet and Russian military officer

== Fiction ==
- Emperio Ivankov, the fictional character from One Piece
