= Wolfgang Birkner =

SS officer (1913–1945)

- Born: 27 October 1913; Breslau, German Empire
- Died: 24 March 1945 (aged 25); Pomerania, Occupied Poland
- Military career
- Allegiance: Nazi Germany
- Branch: Allgemeine-SS
- Rank: SS-Hauptsturmführer
- Unit: SS-Reich Security Main Office (1939–1943)
- Conflicts: World War II; Invasion of Poland (1939)

Wolfgang Birkner (27 October 1913 – 24 March 1945) was a German SS functionary and a Holocaust perpetrator in World War II. Birkner served as the KdS Warschau (Komandeur der Sicherheitspolizei) in Warsaw following the German invasion of Poland in 1939.

After the German attack on the Soviet Union in 1941, Birkner and his Einsatzkommando were deployed in the newly formed Bialystok District in the Army Group Centre Rear Area. Birkner arrived in Białystok from the General Government on 30 June 1941, sent in by the SS Police commander Eberhard Schöngarth on orders from the Reich Security Main Office. As veteran of Einsatzgruppe IV from the 1939 invasion of Poland, Birkner was a specialist in rear security operations.

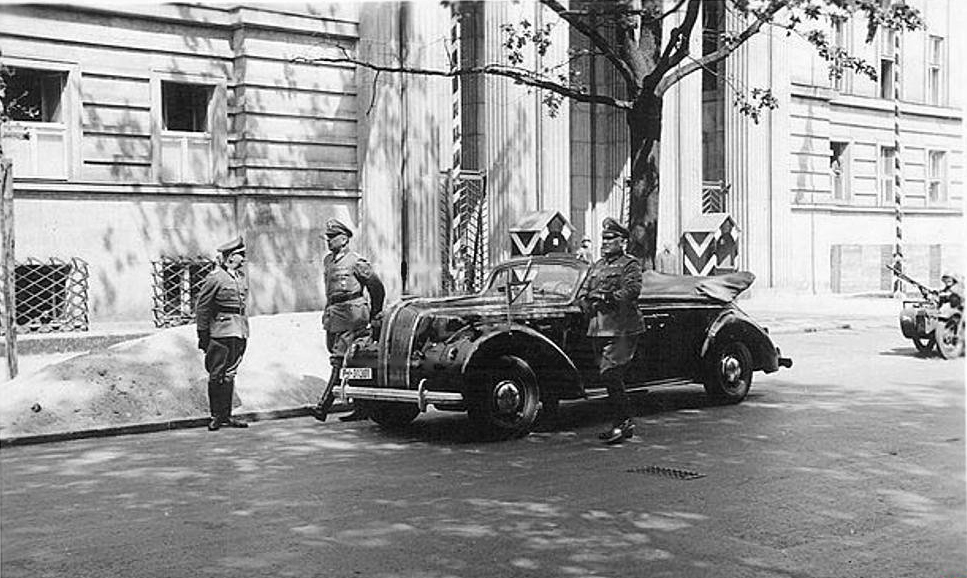
Headquarters of Sicherheitspolizei (SiPo), and the seat of KdS Warschau (Komandeur der Sicherheitspolizei und SD für den Distrikt Warschau) in Warsaw. Birkner served here before his deployment to Bialystok District

== Kommando Bialystok ==
Birkner was appointed chief of the Kommando Bialystok under Arthur Nebe, commander of Einsatzgruppe B. Birkner's death squad was made up of 29 SS men, as well as Gestapo functionaries. Birkner and his squad committed mass murder in and around Białystok. In the two initial months of operation, between 30 June and 28 August 1941, they had claimed the lives of 1,800 Jews. Birkner was promoted to the rank of SS-Hauptsturmführer Kriminalkommissar (the equivalent of a police captain) on 20 April 1943. He was killed in the Pomorze Province on 24 March 1945.

Birkner was investigated by the West German prosecutors in 1960, prior to a court trial of the SS commander Hermann Schaper, who had directed parallel mass murders by Kommando SS Zichenau-Schröttersburg in the same area.
