= Horst Böhme (SS officer) =

German SS officer

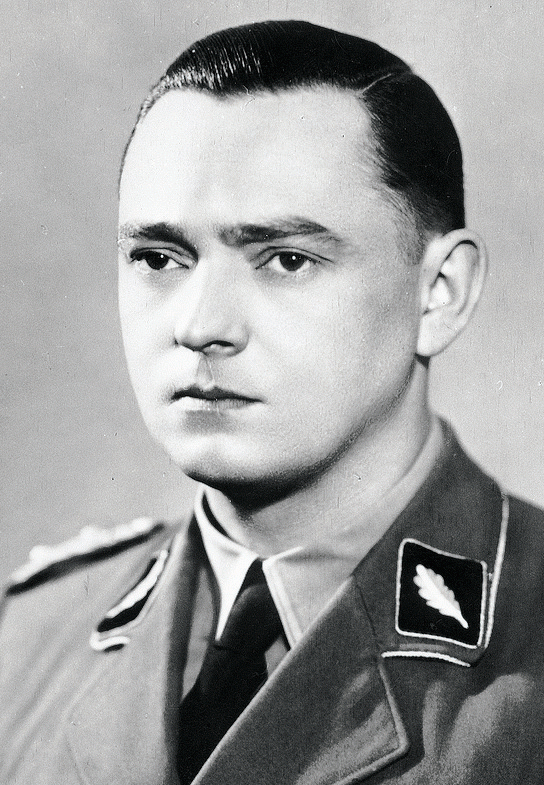
- Böhme as an SS-Standartenführer
- Born: 24 August 1909; Klingenberg, Saxony, German Empire
- Died: 10 April 1945 (aged 35) Königsberg, East Prussia (assumed)
- Allegiance: Nazi Germany
- Branch: Sicherheitsdienst
- Rank: SS-Oberführer
- Commands: SD Commands in Austria, the Protectorate of Bohemia and Moravia and East Prussia; Einsatzgruppe B Einsatzgruppe C

Horst Böhme (24 August 1909 – 10 April 1945) was a German SS functionary during the Nazi era. He served in the SD, the intelligence service of the SS, and was a leading perpetrator of the Holocaust.

== SS career ==
=== Prewar activities ===
Böhme attended Volksschule and worked as a freight forwarder. He was politically involved in the Jungstahlhelm, the Marinebrigade Ehrhardt and the Freikorps Oberland. Böhme joined the NSDAP in 1930 (Nazi Party membership number 236,651). At the same time, he became a member of the SS (membership number 2,821). After promotion to SS-Untersturmführer (4 July 1934) and SS-Obersturmführer (9 November 1934), he worked in the Sicherheitsdienst or SD (Security Service) office in Berlin from 1935, where he soon became a close associate of SD chief Reinhard Heydrich.

In the ensuing years, Böhme mainly took his orders from Heydrich. On 13 or 14 March 1938, on Heydrich's orders, Böhme murdered Wilhelm Freiherr von Ketteler by drowning. Ketteler was an attaché at the German embassy in Vienna, who was hated by the SS because of his anti-Nazi activities. In step with the growth of the SS, Böhme also continued to rise in the organization. On 30 January 1936, he was promoted to SS-Hauptsturmführer, then appointed SS-Sturmbannführer on 20 April 1937, and in 1938 became SS-Obersturmbannführer und Oberstleutnant der Polizei.

After the occupation of Czechoslovakia in spring 1939, Böhme was appointed the SiPo (Security Police) chief for the Protectorate of Bohemia and Moravia, based in Prague. In this capacity, he was responsible for the command authority over all departments of the Gestapo in the Protectorate of Bohemia and Moravia. Among his close associates in this position were Hans-Ulrich Geschke, leader of the Gestapo office in Prague, and Wilhelm Nölle, leader of the Gestapo office in Brno.

=== Wartime role ===
As part of Sonderaktion Prag on 17 November 1939, Böhme was instrumental in the closure of Czech institutions of higher learning and the deportation of 1,500 students to Sachsenhausen concentration camp. On 10 October 1940, Böhme, along with Heydrich, Hans Frank, Adolf Eichmann and Hans Günther, took part in the meeting to determine the deportation of Jews in the Protectorate – some 88,000 people.

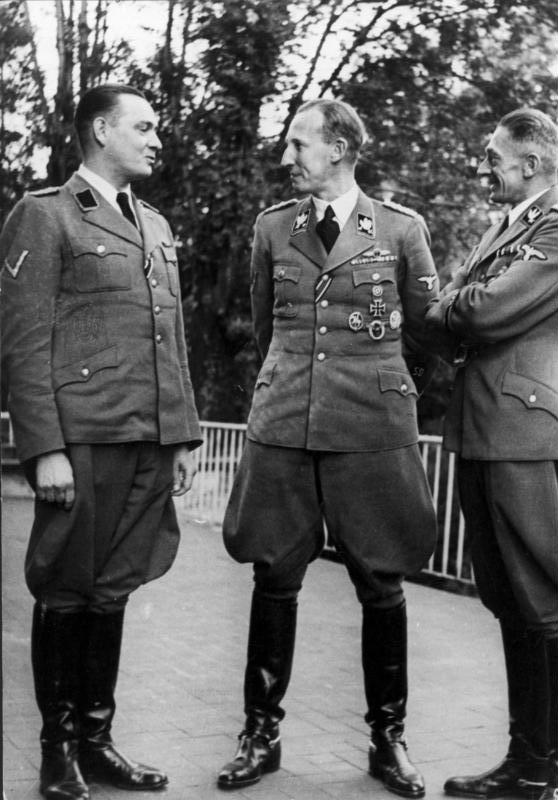
Horst Böhme (left) with Reinhard Heydrich (middle) and Karl Hermann Frank in Prague, September 1941

==== Lidice massacre ====
After the assassination of Reinhard Heydrich in May 1942, Böhme – since 21 October 1941 with the rank of SS-Standartenführer – immediately acted on the "retaliation" orders from Adolf Hitler by perpetrating the massacre at Lidice. When Böhme thought the executions were proceeding too slowly with the men being shot in groups of five, he ordered that ten men be shot at a time. In total, 184 men were killed, 195 women were deported to Ravensbrück concentration camp, and 88 children were deported to resettlement camps in Łódź. The children's arrival was announced by a telegram from Böhme's Prague office which ended with: the children are only bringing what they wear. No special care is desirable. The care was minimal. They suffered from a lack of hygiene and from illnesses. By order of the camp management, no medical care was given to the children. Shortly after their arrival in Łódź, officials from the Central Race and Settlement branch chose seven children for Germanisation. The few children considered racially suitable for Germanisation were handed over to SS families. Only 17 children ever returned to Lidice.

=== Romania, Russia and East Prussia ===
In September 1942, Böhme was a police attaché to Bucharest. From January to August 1943, he led the Einsatzgruppe B, which perpetrated the mass murder of civilians in the Soviet Union. From September 1943 to March 1944, Böhme worked in the same capacity for Einsatzgruppe C before returning to Einsatzgruppe B in August 1944 (now a police colonel). On 9 November 1944, he was made an SS-Oberführer.

In the last phase of the war he was commander of the Security Police and the SD (Befehlshaber der Sicherheitspolizei und des SD (BdS)) in East Prussia. Since April 1945, Böhme, who was last seen in combat near Königsberg, was considered lost.

After the war, Böhme was listed as a war criminal on the international wanted list for some years. He was declared dead by the district court of Kiel on 12 August 1954, with a death date of 10 April 1945. It was presumed that he had either died in combat or shot himself so as not to fall into Soviet hands.

== Bibliography ==
- Bernd Diroll: Personen-Lexikon der NSDAP. Band 1: SS-Führer A - B. Patzwall, Norderstedt 1998, ISBN 3-931533-38-7.
- Gerwarth, Robert (2011). Hitler's Hangman: The Life of Heydrich. New Haven, CT: Yale University Press. ISBN 978-0-300-11575-8.
- Slavomir Horský: Verbrechen, die nicht verjähren. Orbis, Prague 1984.
- Otto Lasch: So fiel Königsberg. Kampf und Untergang von Ostpreußens Hauptstadt. Gräfe und Unzer, Munich 1958, (Neuauflagen, u. a.: Motorbuch-Verlag, Stuttgart 1991, ISBN 3-87943-435-2).
- Sebastian Weitkamp: SS-Diplomaten. Die Polizei-Attachés und SD-Beauftragten an den deutschen Auslandsmissionen, in: Deformationen der Gesellschaft? Neue Forschungen zum Nationalsozialismus. Hrsg. von Christian A. Braun/Michael Mayer/Sebastian Weitkamp. wvb, Berlin 2008, ISBN 978-3-86573-340-5, S. 49–74.
- Michael Wildt: Generation des Unbedingten. Das Führungskorps des Reichssicherheitshauptamts. Durchgesehene und aktualisierte Neuausgabe. Studienausgabe. Hamburger Edition, Hamburg 2003, ISBN 3-930908-87-5.
