= Günther Herrmann (SS commander) =

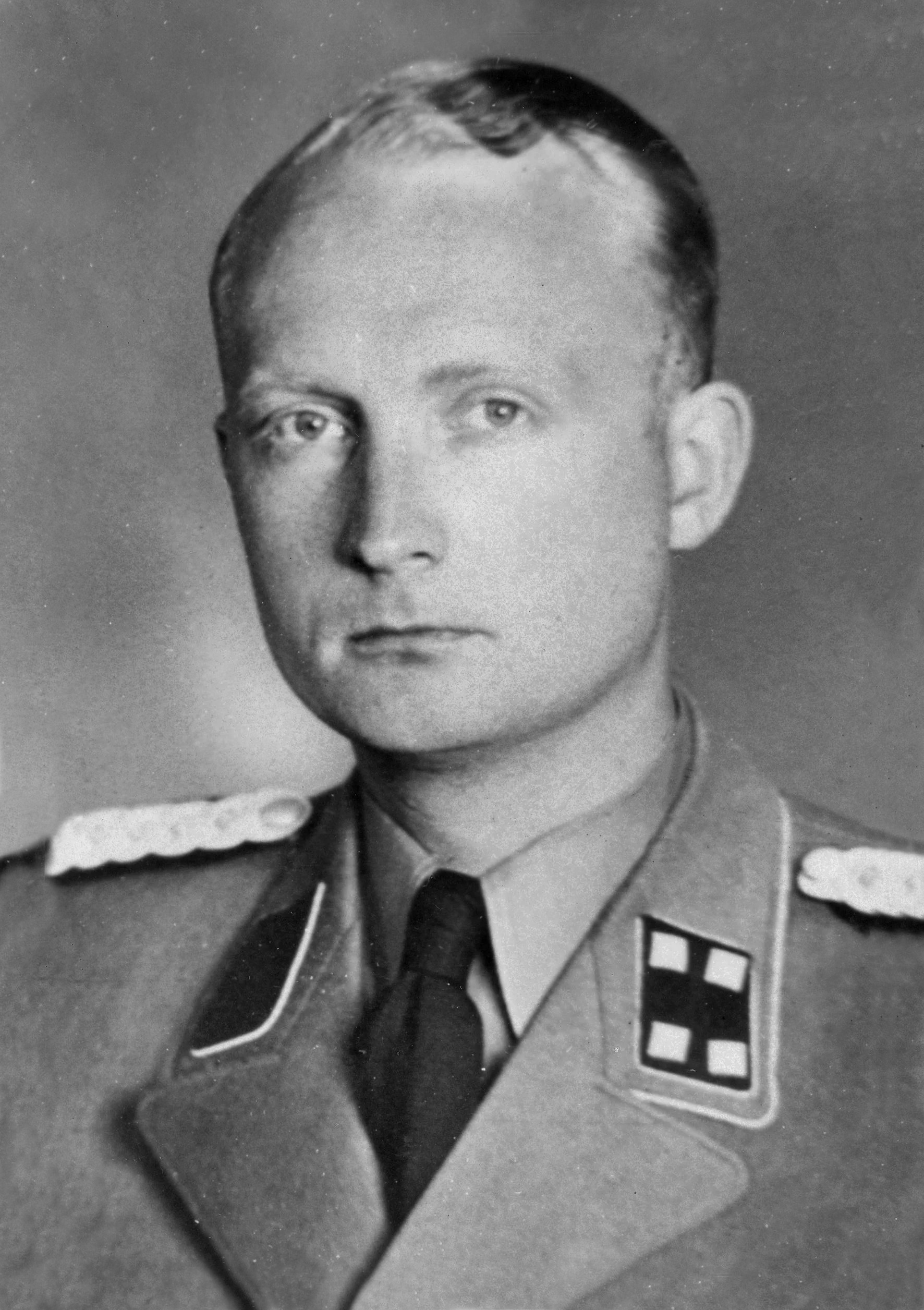
- Born: 15 September 1908; Minden, German Empire
- Died: 17 February 2004 (aged 95); Cologne, Germany
- Occupation: SS official
- Organization: Einsatzgruppen
- Known for: Commander of Sonderkommando 4b, Einsatzkommando 12
- Motive: Nazism
- Conviction: Accessory to murder
- Penalty: 7 years of imprisonment

Günther Herrmann (15 September 1908 − 17 February 2004) was a functionary in the SS of Nazi Germany during World War II and a convicted criminal. He commanded the Sonderkommando 4b and the Einsatzkommando 12 of the Einsatzgruppe C in the occupied Soviet Union and the Einsatzgruppe E in Croatia. In 1973, Herrmann was convicted of the murders committed in 1941–42 in the occupied Soviet Union and was sentenced to seven years in prison.

== SS career ==
Herrmann studied jurisprudence and political science at the Göttingen University. He joined the Nazi Party in 1933 and the SS in 1935. In February 1935, Herrmann was appointed deputy chief of Gestapo in Kiel; between 1936 and 1939 he was head of the Gestapo in Kassel. Upon the German occupation of Czechoslovakia and the establishment of the Protectorate of Bohemia and Moravia in 1939, Herrmann was appointed as head of the Gestapo in Brno.

In June 1941, Herrmann was appointed to the command of Sonderkommando 4b of Einsatzgruppe C, which was attached to Army Group South of the Wehrmacht and operated in northern and central Ukraine. Herrmann's command arrived in Lemberg on 30 June 1941, where it cooperated with the Ukrainian militia. In Tarnopol, in cooperation with Hermann's unit, Ukrainian nationalists instigated pogroms against the local Jewish population. By the time Herrmann's unit left Tarnopol on 11 July, 127 people had been executed and 600 more had been murdered in the pogroms.

In mid-August 1941, Herrmann attended the meeting of the Einsatzgruppen leadership at Zhitomir where they received the "strict order" that from then on Jewish women and children were also to be killed. On this occasion, Herrmann was chastised for his slow pace of killings. According to the post-war testimony of his subordinate, Lothar Fendler, Herrmann complained that the higher ups "judged the effectiveness of a commando according to the number of persons the commando has executed".

Sonderkommando 4b continued on to Proskurov, Vinnytsa, Kirovohrad and reached Kremenchuk and Poltava in September. According to a report of 25 September 1941, Herrmann's commando had murdered 13 Soviet officials and 290 Jews. On 1 October 1941, Herrmann was succeeded by Fritz Braune. According to the post-war testimony of Braune, Herrmann was warmly sent off by General Hermann Hoth, commander of the 3rd Panzer Group.

In October 1942, Herrmann was appointed as commander of Einsatzkommando 12 of Einsatzgruppe D. This commando operated in the area of Pripyat marshes in 1943. From 1943 to 1944 Herrmann led Einsatzgruppe E in Croatia.

== Trial and conviction ==
Herrmann was arrested in 1962, but was released on bail. On 12 January 1973 he was convicted for his responsibility for the murder of Jews, Soviet state officials, members of the resistance and the mentally disabled as committed by the Sonderkommando 4b in Ukraine in 1941–42. Herrmann was sentenced to 7 years in prison. He was released from prison on 26 October 1980.
