= David W. Peck =

American judge

- Born: December 3, 1902; Crawfordsville, Indiana, U.S.
- Died: August 23, 1990 (aged 87); New York City, New York, U.S.
- Occupation: Jurist

David W. Peck (December 3, 1902 – August 23, 1990) was an American jurist. From 1947 to 1957, he was Presiding Justice of the Appellate Division, First Department in New York, and in that time took a leading role in the reform of judiciary of that state. In 1950, in Germany, Peck led the Advisory Board on Clemency on recommendations for clemency for convicted war and Nazi criminals.

== Life and work ==
David Warner Peck was born in Crawfordsville in Indiana (Crawfordsville is the administrative head of Montgomery County and home to Wabash College, a private college). Peck skipped his senior year of high school and began at age 16 to study in Wabash College, where after three years, instead of the usual four, he graduated with honors. He then studied law at Harvard Law School. To finance his studies he worked as a tutor.

After graduating and receiving his license to practice law in New York, in 1934 Peck joined the law firm of Sullivan & Cromwell, with which he remained connected throughout his life. He was a partner in the firm for 31 years, handling civil litigation. Peck was a Republican in the early 1930s and was associated with Thomas E. Dewey and Herbert Brownell of the so-called "Young Turks" of the Republican Party in New York County.

In 1943, Peck was appointed a Justice of the Supreme Court of the State of New York, the state's trial court. In 1945, he was named an associate justice of the Appellate Division, First Department, and in 1947, he was promoted to Presiding Justice of that court, which handles appeals from trial courts in Manhattan and the Bronx. When appointed as Presiding Justice, Peck was 44 years old, becoming the youngest judge to serve as presiding justice of the First Department. In 1957, Peck left the court and returned to Sullivan & Cromwell, where he remained until retiring in 1980. In 1977 sculptor Joseph Kiselewski created a bronze medallion featuring the likeness of Justice Peck.

In 1955, Peck published The Greer Case, a book about a 1946 trusts-and-estates case involving Mabel Seymour Greer, in which he was involved as a judge. Mrs. Greer admitted before her death to have given a son up for adoption after birth, but the entire substantial fortune of this otherwise childless woman was bequeathed to Harvard University. An alleged son contested the will. The book became a best-seller, going through eight editions by Penguin and Reader's Digest Edition, and in 1957 was filmed as an episode of the CBS series Playhouse 90.

In 1973, Attorney General Elliot Richardson offered Peck the role of special counsel to investigate the Watergate scandal but he declined. Archibald Cox ultimately received the post.

=== The "Peck Panel" ===
In 1950, the U.S. High Commissioner for Germany, John McCloy, convened an Advisory Board on Clemency (also known as the Peck Panel, after its chairman David Peck) as an independent expert panel to make recommendations on sentences of persons convicted by U.S. Military tribunals as war criminals. The Panel included, in addition to Peck as Chairman, two other persons: Frederick A. Moran, Chairman of the New York Board of Parole and Brigadier General Conrad E. Snow, Legal Advisor of the US State Department. The legal status of the Peck Panel was not fully understood; in practice, it functioned as a clemency committee. The Peck Panel considered the clemency petitions of the convicts and the exculpatory briefs of their defence lawyers.

The Peck Panel reviewed the clemency petitions of 99 convicts; all were in prison as war criminals in Landsberg. The Peck Panel on August 28, 1950, gave its recommendations. In 77 of 99 cases, the panel recommended a reduction of penalties; this included that seven of the 15 death sentences be commuted to imprisonment. Among the Peck Panel recommendations:

- For 20 convicted in the Einsatzgruppen Trial:
  - 7 x maintain the death sentence (Blobel, Braune, Klingelhöfer, Naumann, Ohlendorf, Ott, Sandberger)
  - 4 x commute the death sentence to 20 (Blume) or 15 years (Biberstein, Haensch, Steimle)
  - 2 x immediate release of persons sentenced to death (Schubert, Seibert)
  - 2 x conversion of a life sentence to 10 years (Jost, Nosske)
  - 1 x shortening of a prison sentence from 20 to 10 years (Schulz)
  - 4 x immediate release of a prison sentence of 20 (Radetzky, Six) and 10 years (Fendler, Rühl)
- For convicts of the Krupp Trial:
  - Release from 12 years' imprisonment Alfried Krupp von Bohlen und Halbach, one of the most prominent cases.
  - Reducing the sentences of other defendants (among others Houdremont and Müller)
- For those convicted in the High Command Trial:
  - Reducing the sentences of other defendants (among others Küchler, Reinecke, Warlimont)
- For those convicted in the Hostages Trial:
  - Reducing the sentences of other defendants (among others Felmy, Lanz, Rendulic)
- For convicts of the Ministries Trial:
  - Reducing the sentences of other defendants (among others Lammers, Schwerin-Krosigk, Ernst von Weizsäcker)

U.S. High Commissioner John J. McCloy, who had the final decision, disagreed with the recommendations of the Peck Panel in a number of cases. His legal adviser and closest confidant, Robert R. Bowie, advised in particular to grant the convicted generals no preferential treatment. On January 31, 1951, McCloy finally announced his decisions. They deviated in a number of cases from the recommendations of the Peck Panel, and were for some stricter, and for others less severe. Only five death sentences from the Nuremberg Military Tribunal judgments remained in force. Of the five death cases reviewed by the Peck Panel, four death sentences were carried out on 7 June 1951: (Blobel, Braune, Naumann, Ohlendorf).

== Publications ==
- The Greer Case, a true court drama. Simon and Schuster, New York 1955.
- Decision at law. Dodd, Mead & Company, New York 1961.

== Literature ==
- Hilary Earl: The Nuremberg SS-Einsatzgruppen Trial, 1945–1958: Atrocity, Law, and History. Cambridge University Press, Cambridge 2009, ISBN 978-0-521-45608-1.
- Norbert Frei: Vergangenheitspolitik: die Anfänge der Bundesrepublik und die NS-Vergangenheit. Beck, München 1996, ISBN 3-406-41310-2.
