= Heinz Schubert (SS officer) =

SS officer (1914–1987)

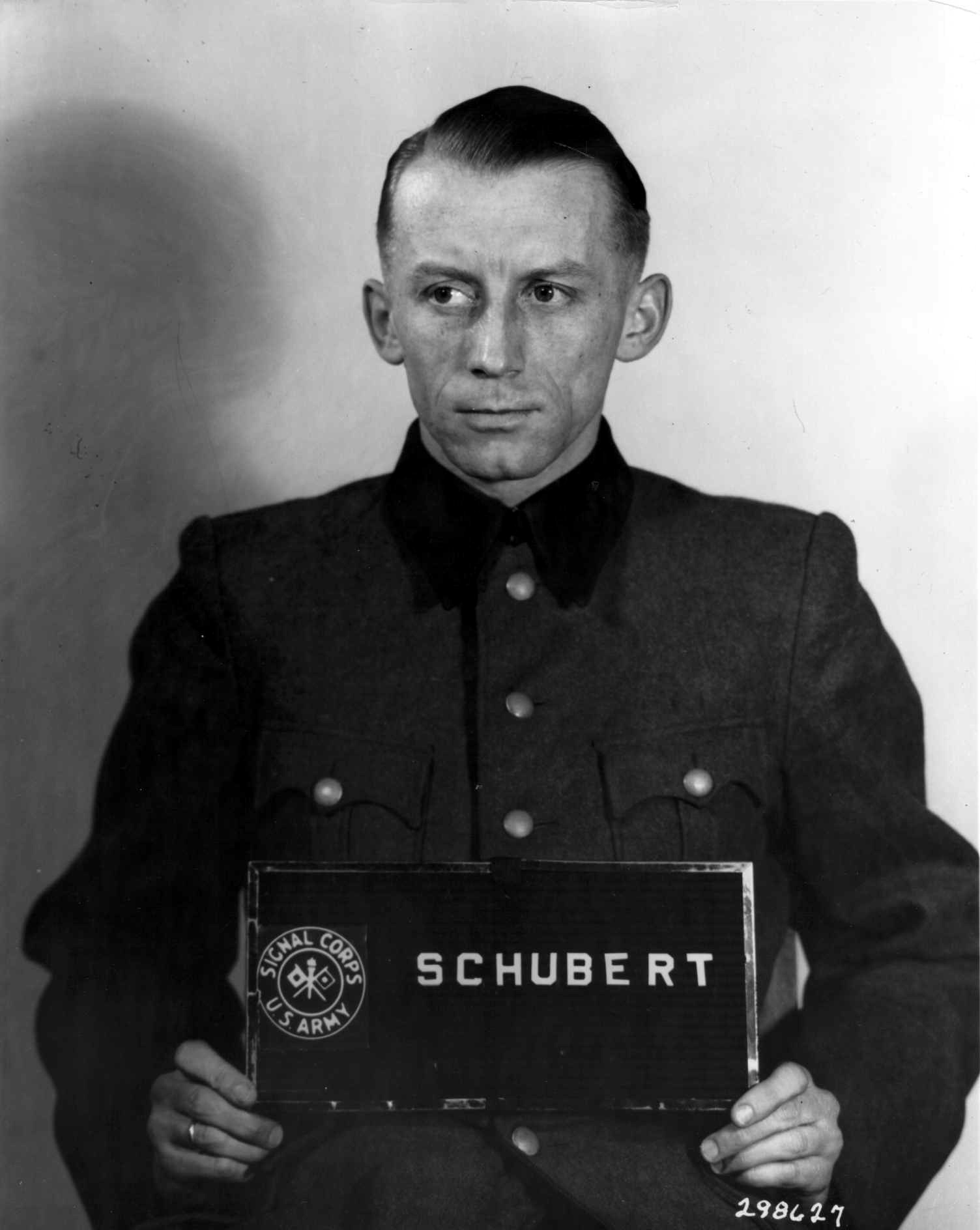
- Schubert's mugshot for the Nuremberg Military Tribunal (1 March 1948)
- Born: 27 July 1914; Berlin, Kingdom of Prussia, German Empire
- Died: 17 August 1987 (aged 73); Bad Oldesloe, Schleswig-Holstein, West Germany
- Status: Deceased
- Motive: Nazism
- Convictions: Crimes against humanity War crimes Membership in a criminal organization
- Trial: Einsatzgruppen trial
- Penalty: Death; commuted to 10 years imprisonment

Details
- Victims: ~700–800 (as an accomplice)
- Date: December 1941
- Country: Ukrainian Soviet Socialist Republic
- SS career
- Allegiance: Nazi Germany
- Branch: Schutzstaffel
- Rank: SS-Obersturmführer
- Unit: Einsatzgruppe D

Heinz Hermann Schubert (27 August 1914 – 17 August 1987) was a German SS officer. He held the rank of Obersturmführer (the equivalent of 1st Lieutenant). He was sentenced to death at the Einsatzgruppen Trial in 1948, which was later commuted to 10 years' imprisonment.

== Origin ==
Heinz Hermann Schubert was born in Berlin shortly after the outbreak of the First World War. He went to school in Eisenberg, Thuringia and then again in Berlin-Lichterfelde, where he attended also a commercial college. From April 1931 to August 1933 Schubert worked for a lawyer.

== Nazi career ==
From August 1933, Schubert worked as a civilian employee for the Reichsstatthalter of Bremen and Oldenburg, headquartered in Bremen. Schubert joined the Nazi party at age 19 on 1 May 1934, and the SS on 10 October 1934. On that date, he started to work for the Sicherheitsdienst (SD). Prior to his use in the Einsatzgruppe, he worked in the department I A 4 (personal details of the SD) of the Reich Security Main Office (RSHA).

== World War II ==
In October 1941, Schubert came as an adjutant of Otto Ohlendorf to the staff of the Einsatzgruppe D. In December 1941, Schubert received the order to organize and oversee the killing of approximately 700 to 800 people in Simferopol. Schubert set the location of the shooting, secluded enough to avoid witnesses. The victims were loaded in the gypsy quarter of Simferopol on delivery trucks. In July 1942 Ohlendorf left Einsatzgruppe D, which was now led by Walther Bierkamp. He returned to the RSHA in Berlin to manage Amt III (SD Germany and German spheres of life). Schubert remained in the RSHA to the end of 1944 as the adjutant of Ohlendorf. He then worked until the war ended for Hans Ehlich in the Office Group III B.

== After the war ==
In 1947–1948, Schubert was the youngest of 24 defendants in the Einsatzgruppen Trial in Nuremberg; his lawyer was Josef Kössel. The judge was American jurist Michael Musmanno. During his trial, Schubert admitted that he'd made sure the site of the executions he presided over was remote so he could ensure that looting was done in a supposedly orderly manner, and the victims were killed "in the most humane and military manner possible." Schubert also said that if the executions somehow deviated from what was planned, he had the authority to intervene as Ohlendorf's adjutant. On 9 April 1948, Schubert was found guilty of all three charges—(1) crimes against humanity, (2) war crimes and (3) membership in a criminal organization—and sentenced to death on 10 April 1948. Despite his young age and rather low service level, Schubert belonged together with Willi Seibert and Hans Gabel (company commander of 4./Reserve-Police-Battalion 9) to the small management team of Einsatzgruppe D under the leadership of Ohlendorf, that murdered approximately 90,000 people. Until the confirmation of his death sentence he was brought to Landsberg Prison for war criminals.

=== Prison time and release ===
After the outbreak of the Korean War the Wiederbewaffnung was discussed from summer 1950. This was why the U.S. high commissioner John J. McCloy on 31 January 1951, due to the recommendations of the "Advisory Board on Clemency for War Criminals" to change 15 death sentences against Landsberg prisoners. This meant, four prisoners to life imprisonment, six prisoners to prison sentences of between ten and twenty-five years. Five death sentences should be carried out. The death sentence against Schubert was converted into a prison sentence of ten years. Schubert was released from prison in December 1951. He died in 1987.

During an interview with Claude Lanzmann for his film Shoah, that Lanzmann recorded covertly, the recording was discovered by Schubert's family, and Lanzmann was physically attacked. Lanzmann was hospitalized for a month and charged by the authorities with "unauthorized use of the German airwaves".

== Literature ==
- Andrej Angrick: Die Einsatzgruppe D. In: Peter Klein (Herausgeber): Die Einsatztruppen in der besetzten Sowjetunion 1941/42. Edition Hentrich, Berlin 1997, ISBN 3-89468-200-0. (Volume 6 of the publications of the Gedenk- und Bildungsstätte Haus der Wannsee-Konferenz)
- Hilary Earl: The Nuremberg SS-Einsatzgruppen Trial, 1945–1958: Atrocity, Law, and History. Cambridge University Press, Cambridge 2009, ISBN 978-0-521-45608-1.
- Norbert Frei: Vergangenheitspolitik: die Anfänge der Bundesrepublik und die NS-Vergangenheit. Beck, München 1996, ISBN 3-406-41310-2.
- Trials of War Criminals Before the Nuernberg Military Tribunals Under Control Council Law No. 10. Vol. 4: United States of America vs. Otto Ohlendorf, et al. (Case 9: "Einsatzgruppen Case"). US Government Printing Office, District of Columbia 1950. In: National Archives Microfilm Publications. NM Series 1874–1946, Microfilm Publication M936. National Archives and Record Service, Washington 1973. (Aussage Schuberts unter Eid: S. 97–98, Auszüge aus dem 98, Auszüge aus dem T04-T0581.htm 581]–584.)
