= Heinz Jost =

German SS officer and Holocaust perpetrator (1904–1964)

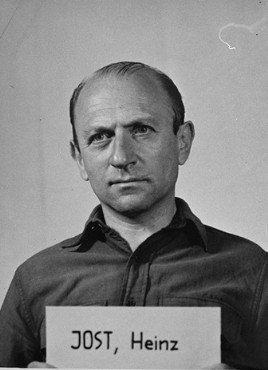
- Mugshot after indictment for the Nuremberg Military Tribunal (July 1947)
- Born: 9 July 1904; Holzhausen, Grand Duchy of Hesse, German Empire
- Died: 12 November 1964 (aged 60); Bensheim on the Bergstraße, Hesse, West Germany
- Occupations: Lawyer, officer, real estate agent
- Motive: Nazism
- Convictions: Crimes against humanity War crimes Membership in a criminal organization
- Penalty: Life imprisonment; commuted to ten years imprisonment

Heinz Jost (9 July 1904 – 12 November 1964) was a German SS officer and Holocaust perpetrator during the Nazi era. He was involved in espionage matters as the Sicherheitsdienst (Security Service; SD) section chief of office VI (foreign intelligence) of the Reich Security Main Office. Jost was responsible for genocidal massacres in Eastern Europe as commander of Einsatzgruppe A from March to September 1942.

After Germany's defeat, Jost was tried and convicted by a U.S. military court at the Einsatzgruppen trial. In December 1951, Jost was released from Landsberg Prison after his sentence was commuted to ten years and died in 1964.

== Early life ==
Heinz Jost was born in Holshausen, a section of the town of Homberg in northern Hesse in 1904, to a middle-class Catholic and nationalistic family. Heinrich Jost, Heinz's father, was a pharmacist and later became a fellow NSDAP member. Jost attended grammar school in Bensheim, graduating in 1923. As a student he became a member, and eventually became a leader, of the Jungdeutsche Orden (Young German Order), a nationalistic paramilitary movement. Jost studied law and economics at the University of Giessen and the Ludwig-Maximilians-Universität München. He completed his civil service examination in May 1927. Heinz's legal career began as a legally trained civil servant employed in Hesse. He later worked in the district court at Darmstadt.

== Career ==
Jost joined the Nazi Party on 2 February 1928 with an NSDAP membership number of 75,946. He performed various functions for the party's operations in southern Hesse. From 1930 he settled as an independent lawyer in Lorsch, Hesse. After the Nazi seizure of power in March 1933, Jost was appointed Director of Police in the city of Worms and then to police director of Giessen. From this period came his association with Werner Best, who brought Jost into the main Nazi intelligence and security agency, the Sicherheitsdienst (SD). On 25 July 1934, Jost began his full-time career with the SD. His SS membership number was 36,243. In May 1936, Jost was promoted in the SD Main Office to head Department III 2 (Foreign Intelligence Services). In 1938, Jost was head of the Einsatzgruppe Dresden which occupied Czechoslovakia. In August 1939 Jost was tasked by Reinhard Heydrich with obtaining the Polish uniforms needed for the false flag attack on the station in Gleiwitz.

When the Reich Security Main Office (RSHA) was established in September 1939, Jost was appointed as chief of Amt VI (Office VI) Ausland-SD (foreign intelligence). One of the chief purposes of Amt VI was to counteract foreign intelligence services that might try to operate in Germany. He also served as an SS officer in the German invasion of Poland in 1939.

== Einsatzgruppe command ==
Jost's career suffered by being linked with Werner Best, who was a rival of Reinhard Heydrich. Best lost a power struggle with Heydrich who went on to become one of the most powerful men in the Nazi state. In March 1942, Jost was fired from his position as Chief of Ausland-SD. Jost's place was taken by Brigadeführer Walter Schellenberg, a deputy of Heydrich. Heydrich had given Schellenberg the task of building up a case for Jost's removal. According to Schellenberg, Jost was lacking in bureaucratic skill and drive.

The general inefficiency of this Amt and the failure of Brigadeführer Heinz Jost in his capacity as chief, to both control his subordinates and manage the department's affairs was common knowledge. In an illuminating pen-picture Jost has been described by Schellenberg as a worn-out, tired, lazy individual lacking initiative or the will to work, who was active at the most for three or four hours a day. During these hours he read a few reports, which he mostly passed on without appreciation or criticism and permitted a small number of individual [advisors] who had often been waiting weeks for an interview, to bring various matters before him. Because of his inability to say "no", Schellenberg says, his subordinates worked without direction needlessly duplicating their work.

Jost was sent to command Einsatzgruppe A, whose previous commander Franz Walter Stahlecker, had recently been killed in a battle with partisans. Einsatzgruppe A was then operating in the Baltic States and in Belarus. Jost became Befehlshaber der Sicherheitspolizei und des SD (Commander of the Security Police and the SD) or BdS in Reichskommissariat Ostland, with his headquarters at Riga. Jost retained this position until September 1942. According to Jost, this position carried substantial responsibility:

During my activity as Chief of the Einsatzgruppe A, I was also Commander in Chief of the Security Police and SD in East land (BdS Ostland). Headquarters for the Einsatzgruppe A was located in Krasnogvardeisk, while headquarters for the Commander in Chief for the Security Police and SD Eastland was located in Riga. On the whole, the duties of a Commander in Chief of the Security Police and SD were the same as those of a Chief of an Einsatzgruppe, and the duties of a Commander of the Security Police and SD (KdS) the same as those of a Chief of a Sonderkommando or Einsatzkommando, respectively.

During the time the territory under his jurisdiction was subject to army control, Jost as Chief of Einsatzgruppe A cooperated with the army command. When the territory came under civilian administration, he, as Commander in Chief of Security Police and SD received his orders from the Higher SS and Police Leader Friedrich Jeckeln. In both cases Jost was responsible for all operations conducted in his territory.

After his Einsatzgruppe command, Jost was able to secure a position with the occupation administration for the eastern territories that was run by Alfred Rosenberg, where he acted as a liaison officer between Rosenberg and the Wehrmacht commander in southern Russia, Ewald von Kleist. At his later trial, Jost claimed that he held this position until May 1944, when as a result of enmity from Heinrich Himmler, he was forced to enlist with the Waffen-SS as a second lieutenant. Himmler decided in January 1945, that Jost should be retired from the SS with a pension.

== Trial and conviction ==
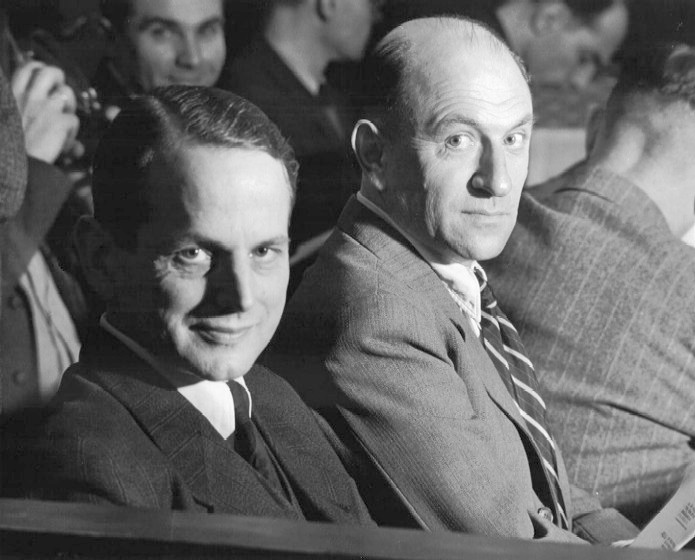
Otto Ohlendorf (foreground), and Heinz Jost (background), as defendants in the Einsatzgruppen Trial

In April 1945, Jost was arrested in Gardelegen, in Saxony-Anhalt, and was charged by the U.S. military with murders committed by Einsatzgruppe A.

At trial (the 9th of the twelve, in total, trials convened, known as the Subsequent Nuremberg Trials), Jost tried to avoid responsibility for these crimes, by claiming the murders (or at least some of them) occurred before he came into command of the unit:

The prosecution charges the defendant with responsibility for these murders. The item itself does not carry the exact date of its happening, but the latest date revealed in the entire document is 26 March. Thus the execution of the 1,272 persons mentioned therein could not have occurred on a date subsequent to 26 March. The defendant testified that he was in Smolensk when, on 24 or 25 March he received his orders to take over the command of Einsatzgruppe A and that he did not arrive in Riga, headquarters of the Einsatzgruppe, until 28 and 29 March.

This defense was rejected by the tribunal:

The record shows that Einsatzgruppe A had accomplished some hundred thousand murders prior to 29 March and, as late as 26 March as indicated by the report above-mentioned, was still killing Jews. It would be extraordinary that it should suddenly cease this slaughter for no given reason and with the Fuehrer Order still in effect, three days before Jost arrived. ...
The record clearly demonstrates, however, that as Chief of Einsatzgruppe A, the defendant was aware of the criminal purpose to which that organization was put, and, as its commander, cannot escape responsibility for its acts.

Jost also claimed, through his attorney, that whatever he had done was justified by "self-defense, necessity, and national emergency". He further claimed he had nothing to do with carrying out the Führer's order (Führerbefehl) for the extermination of entire populations. These claims were rejected by the tribunal as being inconsistent with each other: "If, as a matter of fact, the defendant committed or approved of no act which could be interpreted either as a war crime or crime against humanity, the argument of self-defense and necessity is entirely superfluous."

Jost did testify that when in May 1942 he received an order from Heydrich to surrender Jews under 16 and over 32 for liquidation, he placed the order in his safe and declined to transmit it. The tribunal found the evidence contradicted him. According to Einsatzgruppen status report number 193, dated 17 April 1942, there was an execution in Kovno [Kaunas], on 7 April 1942, of 22 persons "among them 14 Jews who had spread Communist propaganda".

The defendant was asked on the witness stand;

"Do you regard it proper, militarily proper, to shoot fourteen people, or only one person for that matter, because he spreads Communist propaganda?" and he replied;
"According to my orders these measures had to be carried out. In that far it was correct and justified."

Defense counsel in arguing this phase of the case said that the victims had indulged in Communist propaganda "up to the last moment". But there is nothing in international law which justifies or legalizes the sentence of death for political opinion or propaganda.

In addition, the tribunal found, that on 15 June 1942, one of Jost's subordinates wrote to the RSHA, requesting shipment of a gas van (used by the Einsatzgruppen for executions by means of carbon monoxide asphixiation) and gas hoses for three gas vans on hand. Jost denied any knowledge of this letter but admitted that the subordinate in question had the authority to order equipment.

His sentence was reviewed by the "Peck Panel". In December 1951, Jost was released from Landsberg Prison after his sentence was commuted to ten years. He then worked in Düsseldorf as a real estate agent. He died in 1964 at Bensheim.
