= Werner Braune =

SS officer (1909–1951)

Karl Rudolf Werner Braune
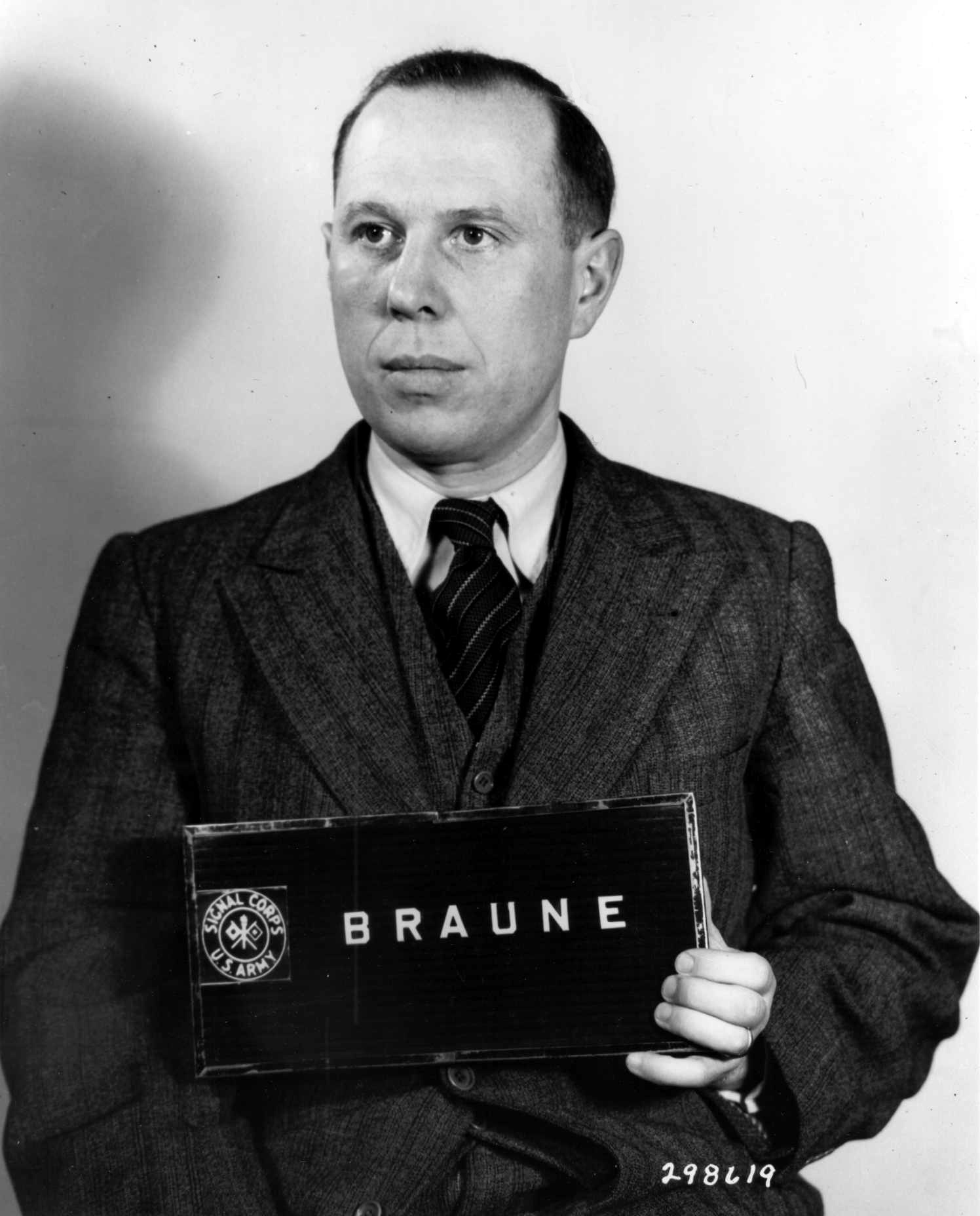
- Braune in 1948
- Born: 11 April 1909; Mehrstedt, German Empire
- Died: 7 June 1951 (aged 42); Landsberg Prison, Landsberg am Lech, West Germany
- Cause of death: Execution by hanging
- Spouse: Margot Braune
- Convictions: Crimes against humanity War crimes Membership in a criminal organization
- Trial: Einsatzgruppen trial
- Penalty: Death

Details
- Victims: 14,300+
- Span of crimes: October 1941 – September 1942
- Country: Ukraine and Russia
- SS career
- Allegiance: Nazi Germany
- Branch: Schutzstaffel
- Rank: SS-Obersturmbannführer
- Unit: Einsatzgruppe D
- Commands: Einsatzkommando 11b

Karl Rudolf Werner Braune (11 April 1909 − 7 June 1951) was a German SS functionary during the Nazi era and a Holocaust perpetrator. During the German invasion of the Soviet Union of 1941, Braune was the commander of Einsatzkommando 11b, part of Einsatzgruppe D. Braune organized and conducted mass murders of Jews in the Army Group South Rear Area, the Reichskommissariat Ukraine (southern Ukraine and in the Crimea). For his role in these crimes, Braune was tried before an American military court in 1948 in the Einsatzgruppen trial. He was convicted, sentenced to death and executed in 1951.

== Early life ==
Braune attended a type of German school known as a Gymnasium and graduated in 1929 with a diploma known as an abitur. He then studied jurisprudence at the University of Jena, the University of Bonn, and the Ludwig-Maximilians-Universität München. He graduated in 1933 with a degree in civil law at the University of Jena. On 1 July 1931, at the age of 22, and while still a student, Braune joined the Nazi Party and was assigned membership number 581,277.

== Nazi career ==
In November 1931, Braune became a member of the Nazi paramilitary organization known as the Sturmabteilung (SA), sometimes called "stormtroopers" in English. In November 1934, he joined the SS and was assigned membership number 107,364. At the same time in 1934 Braune began working for the Nazi Security Service known as the Sicherheitsdienst (SD). In 1936, Braune was also working for the secret police organization, the Gestapo. In 1938 he became acting Gestapo leader in Münster. In 1940, he became a Gestapo chief, first in Koblenz, next in the state police office in Wesermünde and then, in May 1941, in Halle.

=== Einsatzgruppe commander ===
From October 1941 to the beginning of September 1942, Braune was the commander of Special Detachment 11b, part of Einsatzgruppen D, which was under the command of Otto Ohlendorf, who later would be executed as a war criminal. Werner Braune's younger brother Fritz Braune (18 July 1910 − 30 December 1992) was the commander of Sonderkommando 4b. Under the command of Werner Braune, Special Detachment 11b carried out the massacre of Simferopol, in the Crimea, where in the course of three days from 11 to 13 December 1941 they murdered 14,300 Jews. In September 1942 Braune returned to Halle. In 1943 he was promoted to the rank of SS-Obersturmbannführer (lieutenant colonel). From 1943 through 1944, he was the leader of the German Foreign Service Academy, until, in 1945, he was sent to Norway as the commander of the Security Police (Sicherheitspolizei; SiPo) and SD.

== Trial and conviction ==
Following the end of the war, Braune was indicted as a war criminal in the Einsatzgruppen trial that was held before the Nuremberg Military Tribunal. Braune's only defense was that he was acting under superior orders, sometimes referred to as the "Nuremberg defense". This was rejected by the court:

In October 1941 he was assigned to Einsatzkommando 11b. As chief of this unit Braune knew of the Fuehrer Order and executed it to the hilt. His defense is the general one of superior orders which avails Braune no more than it does anyone else who executes a criminal order with the zeal that Braune brought to the Fuehrer Order. Various reports implicate Braune and his Kommando in the sordid business of illegal killings. The Tribunal has already spoken of the Christmas massacre of Simferopol. Braune was the leader in charge of this operation. He has admitted responsibility for this murder in unequivocal language.

On 10 April 1948, Braune was sentenced to death and shortly after midnight on 7 June 1951 he was executed by hanging at Landsberg Prison. Also hanged on 7 June 1951 at Landsberg Prison were six other Nazi war criminals including Otto Ohlendorf, Erich Naumann, Paul Blobel and Oswald Pohl.

As Braune was escorted down the hallway to the gallows, he shouted "Kameraden, es lebe Deutschland!" (Comrades, long live Germany!).
