= Emil Haussmann =

SS officer, Holocaust perpetrator (1910–1947)

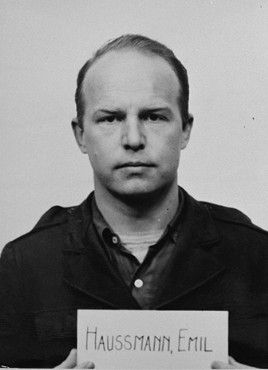
- Haussmann's mugshot after his indictment for the Nuremberg Military Tribunal (July 1947)
- Born: 11 October 1910; Ravensburg, Kingdom of Württemberg, German Empire
- Died: 31 July 1947 (aged 36); Nuremberg Prison, Bavaria, Allied-occupied Germany
- Cause of death: Suicide by hanging
- Political party: Nazi Party
- Status: Deceased
- Criminal charges: Crimes against humanity War crimes Membership in a criminal organization
- Trial: Einsatzgruppen Trial
- Military career
- Allegiance: Nazi Germany
- Branch: Schutzstaffel
- Rank: Sturmbannführer
- Units: Einsatzgruppe VI; Einsatzkommando 12

Emil Haussmann (11 October 1910 – 31 July 1947) was a German SS functionary during the Nazi era. He was part of Einsatzkommando 12 of Einsatzgruppe D, which perpetrated the Holocaust in occupied Ukraine. Haussmann was charged with crimes against humanity in 1947 in the Einsatzgruppen Trial. Two days after his indictment, Haussmann committed suicide.

== Life ==
Emil Haussmann was the son of an accountant in Ravensburg. He joined the Nazi Party in January 1930—three years before the Machtergreifung—at the age of 19. Haussmann was a grade school teacher. In 1937, he became a full-time employee of the Sicherheitsdienst (SD), and took over the SD-Oberabschnitt Süd-West Southwest, based in the Judenreferat in Stuttgart.

During the invasion of Poland, Haussmann was part of Einsatzgruppe VI. There he was the "right hand man" for Albert Rapp, the leader of the Eins. Commanding this Einsatzgruppe was Erich Naumann, who was later a co-defendant of Haussmann. After the end of hostilities, Haussmann remained with Rapp in Poland; Rapp led the Umwandererzentralstelle in Poznań. This office coordinated the expulsion of Poles, Ukrainians, and Jews, in Reichsgau Wartheland, Reichsgau Danzig-West Prussia, East Upper Silesia and Aktion Zamosc. Haussmann joined Einsatzkommando 12 during the invasion of the Soviet Union, during which he participated in the mass murder of Jews in Ukraine.

== Trial and suicide ==
In 1947 he was one of 24 defendants at the Einsatzgruppen Trial. On 29 July 1947, he received the indictment along with his co-defendants: (1) crimes against humanity, (2) war crimes, and (3) membership in a criminal organization.

Two days later, before the arraignment, Haussmann hanged himself in his cell and was removed from the process. Thus, he and Otto Rasch, who was declared unfit for stand trial by medical reasons, were the only defendants at the Einsatzgruppen trial who escaped a sentence.

== Bibliography ==
- Earl, Hilary Camille (2009). The Nuremberg SS-Einsatzgruppen trial, 1945-1958 : atrocity, law, and history. Cambridge: Cambridge University Press. ISBN 978-0-521-45608-1. OCLC 263146903.
- Mallmann, Klaus-Michael; Böhler, Jochen; Matthäus, Jürgen (2008). Einsatzgruppen in Polen : Darstellung und Dokumentation. Darmstadt: Wiss. Buchges. ISBN 978-3-534-21353-5. OCLC 239272595.
- Trials of War Criminals Before the Nuernberg Military Tribunals Under Control Council Law No. 10, Vol. 4: United States of America vs. Otto Ohlendorf, et al. (Case 9: „Einsatzgruppen Case“). US Government Printing Office, District of Columbia 1950. In: „National Archives Microfilm Publications“, NM Series 1874–1946, Microfilm Publication M936. National Archives and Record Service, Washington 1973. (Emil Haussmann in the indictment: p. 14.)
