= Martin Sandberger =

German Nazi SS officer (1911–2010)

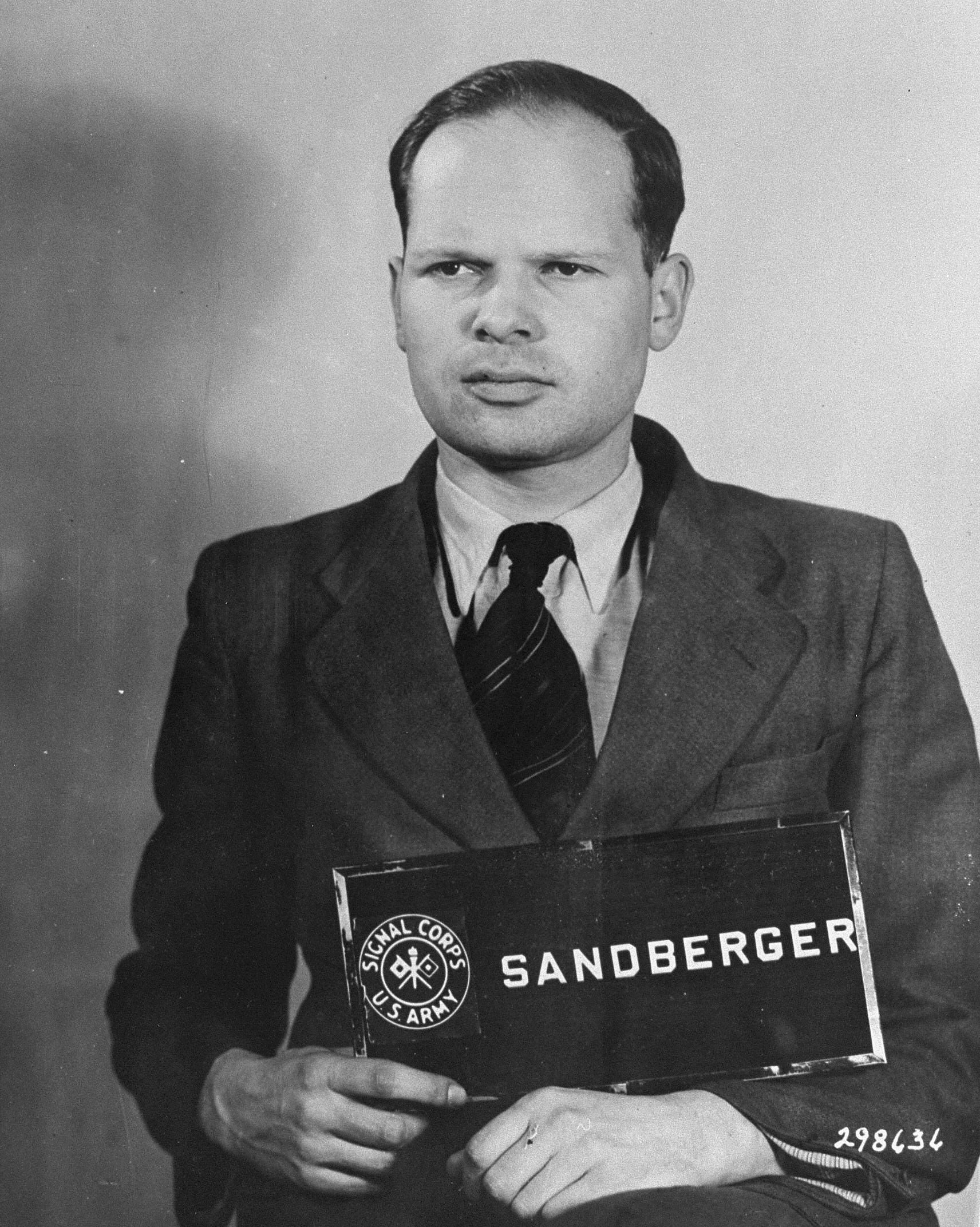
- Sandberger's mugshot for the Nuremberg Military Tribunal (1 March 1948)
- Born: 17 August 1911; Charlottenburg, Brandenburg, Prussia, German Empire
- Died: 30 March 2010 (aged 98); Stuttgart, Baden-Württemberg, Germany
- Occupations: Lawyer, judicial clerk, Nazi official
- Convictions: Crimes against humanity War crimes Membership in a criminal organization
- Trial: Einsatzgruppen trial
- Penalty: Death; commuted to life imprisonment; further commuted to time served

Karl Martin Sandberger (17 August 1911 – 30 March 2010) was a German SS functionary during the Nazi era and a convicted Holocaust perpetrator. He was the commander of Sonderkommando 1a of Einsatzgruppe A, as well as of the Sicherheitspolizei and SD at the time of Nazi German occupation of Estonia during World War II. Sandberger perpetrated mass murder of the Jews in German-occupied Latvia and Estonia. As the Gestapo chief in Verona, he was also responsible for the arrest of Jews in Italy, and their deportation to Auschwitz concentration camp. Sandberger was the second-highest official of the Einsatzgruppe A to be tried and convicted. He was also the last-surviving defendant from the Nuremberg Military Tribunals.

== Background and early career ==
Martin Sandberger was born in Charlottenburg, Berlin as a son of a director of IG Farben. Sandberger studied law at the Ludwig-Maximilians-Universität München, the University of Cologne, the University of Freiburg, and the University of Tübingen. At the age of 20, he joined the Nazi Party and the SA. From 1932 to 1933, Sandberger was a Nazi student activist and student leader in Tübingen. On 8 March 1933, Sandberger and fellow student Erich Ehrlinger raised the Nazi flag in front of the main building at the University of Tübingen. (Like Sandberger, Ehrlinger would take charge of an Einsatzkommando in 1941, and in so doing, commit thousands of murders.)

By 1935, he had obtained his doctor of law degree. As a functionary of the Nazi student League, he eventually became a university inspector. In 1936. he became an enlisted member of the SS and came under the command of Gustav Adolf Scheel for the SD in Württemberg.

He began a career with the SD and, by 1938, he had risen to the rank of SS-Sturmbannführer (major). Sandberger worked as an assistant judge for the Interior Ministry of Württemberg and was appointed as a Regierungsrat (government councilor) in 1937.

== Activities during the Second World War ==
Following the German invasion and occupation of Poland in September 1939, Heinrich Himmler embarked on a program, known as Heim ins Reich (approximate translation: Return to the Nation) which involved driving out the native population in areas of Poland and replacing them with ethnic Germans (Volksdeutsche) from various countries, such as the Baltic states and Soviet-occupied eastern Poland. On 13 October 1939 Himmler appointed Sandberger the chief of the Northeast Central Immigration Office (Einwandererzentralstelle Nord-Ost) and tasked with the "racial evaluation" (rassische Bewertung) of the various Volksdeutsche immigrants. Sandberger also performed this task in western Prussia, deporting Jews from Schneidemühl (today, Piła) to Lublin to enable Baltic Germans to be settled there. In May 1940, he was transferred to Alsace after the fall of France to perform the same function. In April 1941, Himmler assigned him to coordinate the removal of Slovenes from northern Slovenia following the German defeat of Yugoslavia.

In June 1941, Sandberger was appointed chief of Sonderkommando 1a of Einsatzgruppe A. During the first two weeks of the German invasion of the Soviet Union, which began on 22 June 1941, Sandberger traveled with Franz Walter Stahlecker, the commander of Einsatzgruppe A. Sandberger was involved since March 1941 in the distribution of a business plan for the RSHA and a director of the curriculum organization of the schools (Lehrplangestaltung der Schulen).

== Knowledge of the Führer Order ==
The Nazi organization most responsible for carrying out The Holocaust in the Baltic states was the Security Service (Sicherheitsdienst), generally referred to by its initials SD. The SD, which organized the Einsatzgruppen, conducted itself in accordance with the understanding that a fundamental order, sometimes called a Führer Order (Führerbefehl) existed to kill the Jews. Sandberger received his knowledge of the Führer order from Bruno Streckenbach, an official with Department IV of the Reich Security Main Office (RSHA). According to Sandberger's testimony as an accused in the Einsatzgruppen trial after the war, Streckenbach gave a speech (at the Gestapo headquarters in Berlin on Prince Albertstrasse) about the Führer order, which Sandberger attended. Streckenbach also gave Sandberger explicit instructions in a personal conversation:

Streckenbach personally informed me about the Führer order, which said that, in order to secure the Eastern territory permanently, all Jews, Gypsies, and communist functionaries were to be eliminated, together with all other elements who might endanger security.

== Transfer to Estonia ==
Sandberger entered Riga with Einsatzkommando 1a and 2. These organizations then engaged in destruction of synagogues, the liquidation of 400 Jews, and the setting up of groups for the purpose of fomenting pogroms. After the war, when on trial for war crimes, Sandberger's effort to evade responsibility was rejected by the tribunal: "Although it has been demonstrated that not only he was in Riga at the time they occurred, but he actually had a conversation about them with the Einsatzgruppe Chief Stahlecker before he left Riga."

In early July 1941, Sandberger was sent to Estonia on the orders of Stahlecker. According to Sandberger's later testimony, Stahlecker made it clear that Sandberger was being sent to Estonia to carry out the Führer order in that country. A variety of shooting actions of Jews, Romani, Communists and the mentally-ill began once Sandberger and his kommando entered Estonia. A report dated 15 October 1941 on executions in Ostland during Sandberger's tenure included one item under Estonia of 474 Jews and 684 Communists.

The arrest of all male Jews of over 16 years of age has been nearly finished. With the exception of the doctors and the elders of the Jews who were appointed by the special Kommandos, they were executed by the self-protection units under the control of the special detachment 1a. Jewesses in Pärnu and Tallinn of the age groups from 16 to 60 who are fit for work were arrested and put to peat-cutting or other labor. At present a camp is being constructed in Harku in which all Estonian Jews are to be assembled, so that Estonia will be free of Jews in a short while.

Others were arrested and sent to concentration camps. Report No. 17, dated 9 July 1941 carried the item —

With the exception of one, all leading communist officials in Estonia have now been seized and rendered harmless. The sum total of communists seized runs to about 14,500. Of these about 1,000 were shot and 5,377 put into concentration camps. 3,785 less guilty supporters were released.

On 10 September 1941, Sandberger promulgated a general order for the internment of Jews which resulted in the internment of 450 Jews in a concentration camp at Pskov, Russia. The Jews were later executed.

Sandburger was highly recommended for promotion in the SS:

* * * He is distinguished by his great industry and better than average intensity in his work. From the professional point of view, S. has proved himself in the Reich as well as in his assignment in the East. S. is a versatile SS Fuehrer, suitable for employment. S. belongs to the Officers of the Leadership Service and has fulfilled the requirements of the promotion regulations up to the minimum age set by the RF-SS (36 years). Because of his political service and his efforts, which far exceed the average, the Chief of the Sipo and SD already supports his preferential promotion to SS Standartenfuehrer.

On 3 December 1941, Sandberger was appointed Kommandeur der Sicherheitspolizei und des SD (KdS) for Estonia, now known as the Generalbezirk Estland. Throughout the winter, he continued murdering Estonian Jews, including those who had been deployed as forced laborers. In a report of 1 July 1942, he claimed that Estonia was Judenfrei.

== Actions in Italy ==
Sandberger returned to Germany in September 1943. In the fall of 1943, Sandberger was appointed the Gestapo chief for the Italian city of Verona. In this capacity he was involved in arresting the Jews of northern Italy and organizing their transportation to Auschwitz concentration camp.

== Espionage activity ==
In January 1944, Sandberger became head of the Department A (Organization and Administration) in the Reich Security Main Office Amt. VI (Ausland-SD, the foreign intelligence service); in this position he reported directly to Walter Schellenberg. He kept the domestic and foreign accounts and financial records of the organization. As the first assistant to Schellenberg, Sandberger acted as his liaison man with Heinrich Himmler.

With all the access he had had to highly secret information, after the war, under British interrogation, Sandberger tried to delay or avoid prosecution by disclosing what he knew. Until internal reports of the Einsatzgruppen were discovered, Sandberger was able to convince the British interpreters that his account of his activities in Tallinn as the Kommandeur der Sicherheitspolizei (or KdS) had involved "'no evidence of any particular criminal actions on his part.'"

== Trial ==
In the Einsatzgruppen trial, Sandberger was charged with crimes against humanity, war crimes, and membership in a criminal organization, that is, the SS. At his trial, Sandberger denied responsibility for the killings described in the 15 October report and sought to blame the German field police and Estonian home guard. This was rejected by the tribunal, which found that the Estonian home guard was under Sandberger's jurisdiction and control for specific operations, as shown by the same report. Similarly, Sandberger claimed he had arrested the Jews sent to Pskov to protect them, hoping that during the internment the Führer order might be revoked or meliorated and he was not in general responsible for their execution at the Pskov detention camp. Sandberger said he was responsible for "only a fraction" of the killings. Sandberger estimated this "fraction" at 300 to 350 persons.

Q. The sum total of Communists seized runs to about 14,500; do you see that?
A. Yes, 14,500, yes.
Q. That means 1,000 were shot?
A. Yes, I get that from the document.
Q. You know it. Did you know of it? Do you remember it?
A. The report must have been submitted to me.
Q. Then at one time, at least, you knew of it?
A. Yes.
Q. Were you in Estonia then?
A. Yes, but they were not shot on my own responsibility. I am only responsible for 350.
Q. You are responsible for 350?
A. That is my estimate.

Sandberger claimed the execution of the Jews at Pskov happened in his absence and without his knowledge. The tribunal found that Sandberger's own testimony convicted him:

Q. You collected these men in the camps?
A. Yes. I gave the order.
Q. You knew that at some future time they could expect nothing but death?
A. I was hoping that Hitler would withdraw the order or change it.
Q. You knew that the probability, bordering on certainty, was that they would be shot after being collected?
A. I knew that there was this possibility, yes.
Q. In fact, almost a certainty, isn't that right?
A. It was probable.

Q. You collected these Jews, according to the basic order, didn't you, the Hitler Order?
A. Yes.
Q. And then they were shot; they were shot; isn't that right?
A. Yes.
Q. By members of your command?
A. From Estonian men who were subordinated to my Sonderkommando leaders; that is also myself then.
Q. Then, in fact, they were shot by members under your command?
A. Yes.
Q. Then, as a result of the Fuehrer Order, these Jews were shot?
A. Yes.

Sandberger testified that he had protested against the inhumanity of the Führer order, but his account was not accepted by the Nuremberg Military Tribunal which was conducting the trial: "Despite the defendant's protestations from the witness stand, it is evident from the documentary evidence and his own testimony, that he went along willingly with the execution of the Fuehrer Order."

== Death sentence and reprieve ==
Sandberger was found guilty on all counts. In September 1947, Judge Michael Musmanno pronounced the tribunal's sentence:

Defendant MARTIN SANDBERGER, on the counts of the indictment on which you have been convicted, the Tribunal sentences you to death by hanging.

Despite political pressures, General Lucius D. Clay confirmed Sandberger's death sentence in 1949. In 1951, Sandberger's sentence was later commuted to life imprisonment by the "Peck Panel" clemency board acting under the authority of John J. McCloy, the U.S. High Commissioner for Germany. McCloy had received political pressure to grant the reprieve from William Langer, U.S. Senator from North Dakota. Many of Langer's constituents were of German descent, and Langer felt that trial of anyone other than the highest Nazis was contrary to American legal tradition and helped Communism.

Sandberger's father, a retired production director of IG Farben, used his connections with West German president Theodor Heuss. Heuss in turn contacted the US Ambassador at that time James B. Conant with the request for pardon. Numerous pleas for leniency from influential individuals including Minister of Justice Wolfgang Haußmann and Landesbischof (bishop) Martin Haug were made. The renowned lawyer and vice-president of the West German parliament Carlo Schmid worried about Sandberger's conditions in Landsberg Prison and spoke out in favor of a commutation. Over time these and other well-connected people lobbied for Sandberger's early release. By late 1957, there were only four war criminals held in prison in West Germany. One of them was Sandberger. He had been denied parole several times. In 1958 the Federal Foreign Office filed parole applications on the behalf of all four inmates still serving time in Landsberg Prison. Sandberger was denied parole, but the board unanimously voted for his life sentence and that of the other three to be commuted to time served. The commutations became official on 6 May 1958, and Sandberger was released three days later. Subsequently, through the mediation of Bernhard Müller, he received a position as legal counsel in the Lechler Group.

Until 1972, Sandberger was repeatedly called as a witness in Nazi war crimes trials, such as in 1958 in the trial against the "Einsatzkommando Tilsit", the so-called Einsatzgruppen trial, in Ulm. A prosecution by the public prosecutor's offices in Munich (1962) and Stuttgart (1971/72) for his responsibility for the "shooting of numerous persons, including communists, Jews and parachutists in the years 1941 – 1943" (investigation of the public prosecutor's office at the Regional Court of Stuttgart in June 1971, p. 1 – the group of Romani is not mentioned here) was discontinued. The reason was that Sandberger had already been convicted in 1948 in the trial before the International Military Tribunal in Nuremberg. This excludes prosecution by German judicial authorities in accordance with the 1955 Treaty on the Regulation of Questions of War and Occupation, the so-called Transition Treaty(see Bundesarchiv B 162/5199 p. 26). Sandberger was believed to be the highest-ranking member of the SS still known to be alive. He died on 30 March 2010, at the age of 98.
