= Söhlde =

- Municipality
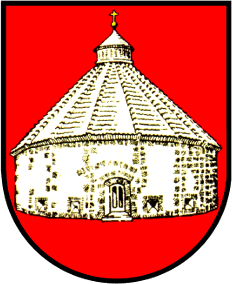
- Coat of arms

- Location of Söhlde within Hildesheim district
- Interactive map of Söhlde
- Location within Germany Location within Lower Saxony
- Coordinates: 52°12′N 10°14′E
- Country: Germany
- State: Lower Saxony
- District: Hildesheim

Government
  - Mayor (2021–26): René Marienfeldt (SPD)

Area
  - Total: 57.09 km^{2} (22.04 sq mi)
- Elevation: 94 m (308 ft)

Population (2025-12-31)
  - Total: 7,487
  - Density: 131.1/km^{2} (339.7/sq mi)
- Time zone: UTC+01:00 (CET)
  - Summer (DST): UTC+02:00 (CEST)
- Postal codes: 31185
- Dialling codes: 05129
- Vehicle registration: HI
- Website: www.soehlde.de

Söhlde is a village and a municipality in the district of Hildesheim, in Lower Saxony, Germany. It is situated approximately 20 km east of Hildesheim, and 10 km northwest of Salzgitter.

== Notable residents ==
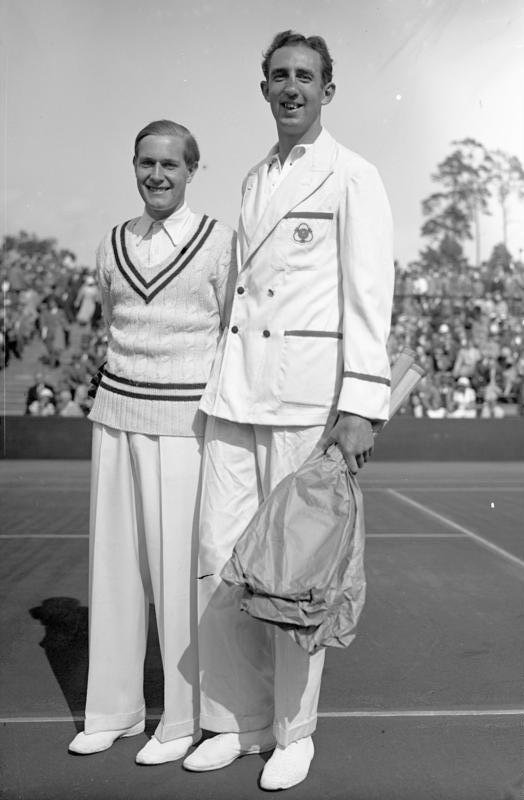
Gottfried von Cramm (left) and George Lyttleton Rogers in 1932

- Gottfried von Cramm (1909-1976), German tennis player
- Otto Ohlendorf (1907-1951, executed), SS general and Holocaust perpetrator, executed for war crimes
