= Lothar Fendler =

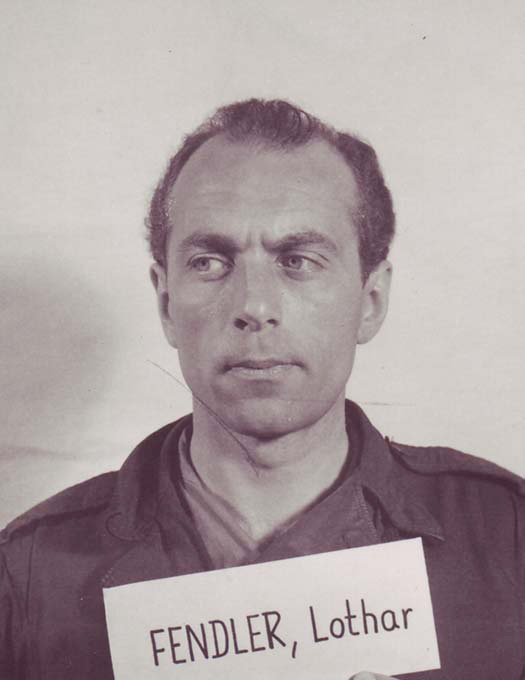
- Fendler's mugshot after his indictment for the Nuremberg Military Tribunal (July 1947)
- Born: 13 August 1913; Breslau, German Empire
- Died: 7 March 1983 (aged 69); Stuttgart, Baden-Württemberg West Germany
- Military career
- Allegiance: Nazi Germany
- Branch: Schutzstaffel and Sicherheitsdienst
- Service years: 1933–1945
- Rank: Sturmbannführer
- Unit: Sonderkommando 4b (Einsatzgruppe C)

Lothar Fendler (13 August 1913 – 7 March 1983) was an SS-Sturmbannführer, in SS-Sonderkommando 4b of Einsatzgruppe C, which was involved in the mass murder of the Jews in occupied Ukraine. At the Einsatzgruppen Trial in 1948, Fendler was sentenced to 10 years in prison. However, he was released early in 1951.

== Life ==
Between 1932 and 1934 Fendler studied dentistry. On 15 April 1933 he joined the SS, service number 272,603.

From 1934 to 1936 he served in the Wehrmacht. After leaving the Wehrmacht Fendler joined the Sicherheitsdienst (SD) in 1936. On 1 May 1937 he joined the NSDAP (number 5,216,392).

In May 1941, Fendler was transferred to Sonderkommando 4b of Einsatzgruppe C to prepare for the Einsatzgruppe actions during Operation Barbarossa, where he was responsible for divisional intelligence. His role according to his testimony at Nuremberg was to write reports on the morale of the local population. On 2 October 1941 he was replaced and returned to Berlin.

He was posted back to the Sonderkommando in March 1942 and returned again to Germany in July of the same year. He spent the rest of the war working for SD foreign intelligence. He was subsequently arrested by the Americans and put on trial at Nuremberg.

From 1947 to 1948, Fendler was one of 24 defendants in the Einsatzgruppen Trial; his defence lawyer was Hans Fritz with the assistance of Dr. Gabriele Lehmann. The presiding judge was Michael A. Musmanno. Fendler was charged with crimes against humanity, war crimes, and membership in a criminal organization.

The case against Fendler was based on the question of whether he reported as deputy leader to Günther Herrmann; this was not conclusively answered. Fendler was certainly Herrmann's second-highest ranking officer in Sonderkommando 4b, and there were only seven officers in the unit. During his trial, Fendler was not implicated in and denied any direct participation in any executions. However, he did admit to his knowledge of his executions, and said he personally felt that they were "too summary". Fendler also confessed to writing reports about the morale about the local population while serving in the unit.

On 10 April 1948, Fendler was sentenced to 10 years in prison. The court found that while there was no evidence of him participating in or planned any executions, he had still taken part in criminal activities. Furthermore, "as the second highest ranking officer in the Kommando, his views could have been heard in complaint or protest against what he now says was a too summary procedure, but he chose to let the injustice go uncorrected."

== Reduction of sentence and release ==
Fendler was sent to Landsberg Prison to serve his sentence. As part of the intensified discussion of West German rearmament after the outbreak of the Korean War in the summer of 1950, on 31 January 1951 High Commissioner for Germany John McCloy assessed the 15 death sentences handed down at Nuremberg on the recommendation of the "Advisory Board on Clemency for War Criminals". Four inmates had their sentences commuted to life imprisonment and six given prison sentences of between ten and twenty-five years, but confirmed that five of the death sentences should be still enforced. Fendler's sentence was reduced to 8 years. He was released from prison in March 1951.
