= Gustav Adolf Nosske =

German Nazi SS general and Holocaust perpetrator (1902–1986)

Gustav Nosske
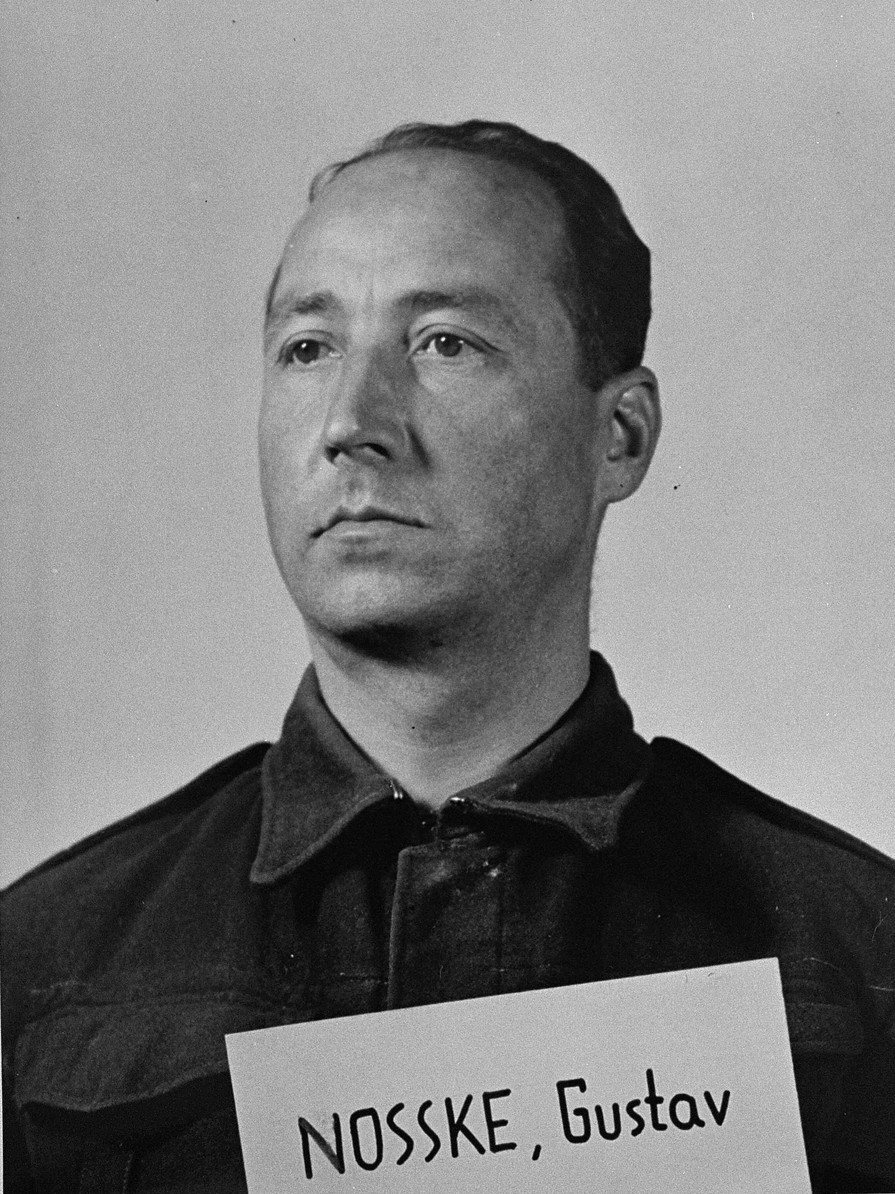
- Nosske's mugshot after his indictment for the Nuremberg Military Tribunal (July 1947)
- Born: 29 December 1902; Halle, German Empire
- Died: 9 August 1986 (aged 83); Düsseldorf, West Germany
- Military career
- Allegiance: Nazi Germany
- Branch: Schutzstaffel
- Service years: 1933–1945
- Rank: SS-Obersturmbannführer
- Unit: Einsatzgruppe D
- Commands: Einsatzkommando 12
- Other work: Lawyer
- Criminal information
- Status: Deceased
- Convictions: Crimes against humanity War crimes Membership in a criminal organization
- Trial: Einsatzgruppen trial
- Penalty: Life imprisonment; commuted to 10 years imprisonment

Gustav Adolf Nosske (29 December 1902 – 9 August 1986) was a German lawyer and SS-Obersturmbannführer. In 1941–42, he commanded Einsatzkommando 12 within Einsatzgruppe D, under the command of Otto Ohlendorf. Tried in the Einsatzgruppen Trial in 1948, Nosske was sentenced to life imprisonment. He was released early in December 1951.

== Career ==
Gustav Aldolf Nosske was born on 29 December in Halle. After studying law, he became a lawyer in Halle and Aachen. Nosske joined the Nazi Party and the SS in 1933. He became the head of the Gestapo in Aachen in 1935 and then in Frankfurt from September 1936 to June 1941.

As a SS-Obersturmbannführer in rank, he was appointed chief of Einsatzkommando 12 before the invasion of the Soviet Union on 22 June 1941. In the areas of Donetsk and Novocherkassk, his unit committed many atrocities against the civilian population. In mid-August 1941 Otto Ohlendorf ordered Nosske to transport 11,000 Jews from Mohyliv-Podilskyi to Yampil in order to make them cross the Dniester river and place them in the Romanian zone. During this walk, hundreds of Jews were murdered. Between 16 and 28 February 1942, Einsatzkommando 12 killed 721 Jews, 271 communists, 74 partisans and 421 Roma.

In April 1942 Nosske joined the Reich Security Main Office (RSHA) in Berlin concerning the Occupied Eastern Territories. In 1943, he was appointed head of the "Foreigners and Enemies of the State" division of the Gestapo. He worked as a liaison officer between the Reich Ministry for the Occupied Eastern Territories and the RSHA. From August 1943 to September 1944 he was head of the state police in Düsseldorf.

During the later Einsatzgruppen Trial held in 1948, Nosske said that in 1944, he had been ordered to collect all German Jews of Düsseldorf married to non-Jews for extermination, but that he had refused to carry this out. The order was ultimately not enforced. The court accepted this as mitigation, but pointed out that this meant Nosske did not have to kill anyone.

== Trial and conviction ==
Nosske was arrested by the Allies and brought to trial at the Einsatzgruppen Trial in 1948 at Nuremberg. He was the only accused who did not seek clemency from General Lucius D. Clay in the American sector of occupation. On 10 April 1948, Nosske was sentenced to life imprisonment for war crimes. He was released early, on 15 December 1951.

Details of his later life are largely unknown, other than a court appearance on 26 March 1965, where he testified as a witness at the Frankfurt Auschwitz Trials, with Düsseldorf as declared place of residence and legal advisor as profession.

He died in Düsseldorf on 9 August 1986.
