= Ernst Biberstein =

SS officer (1899–1986)

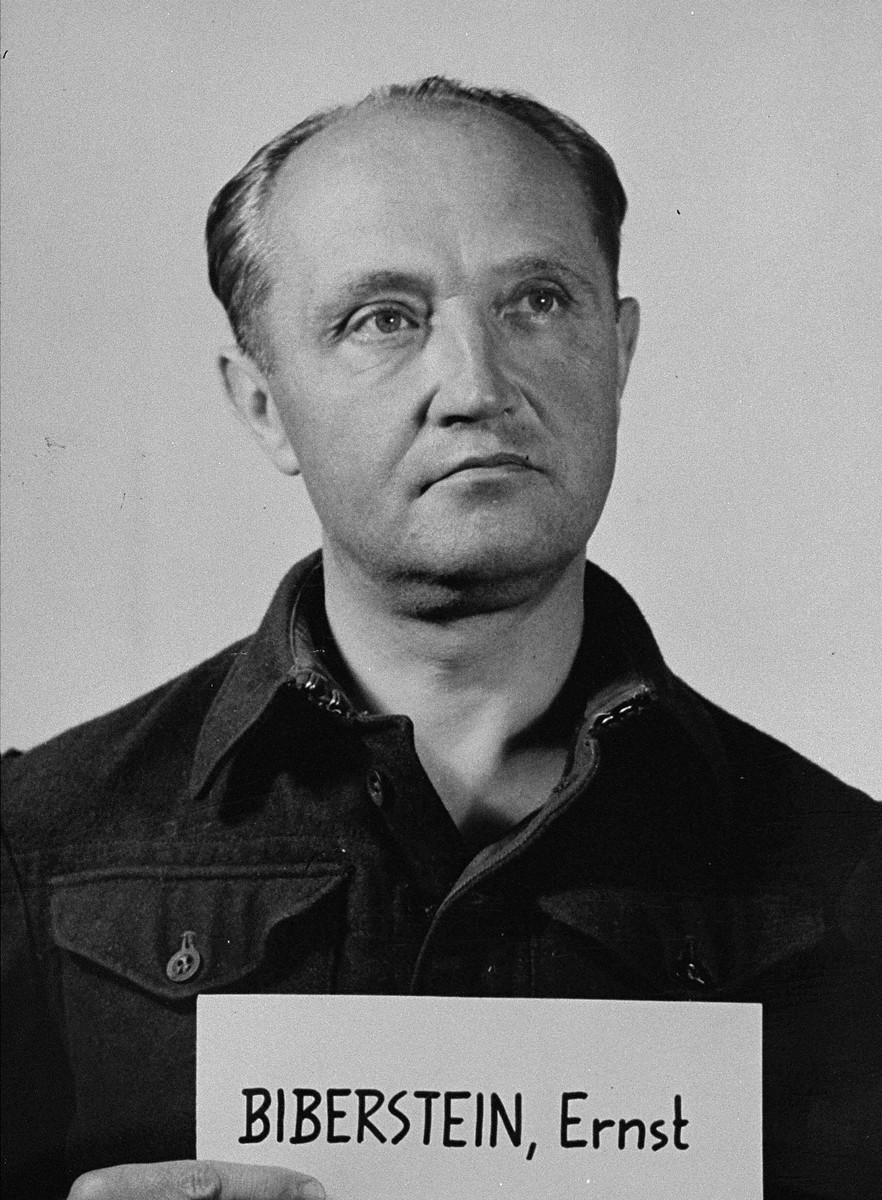
- Biberstein's mugshot after his indictment for the Nuremberg Military Tribunal (July 1947)
- Born: Ernst Schzymanowski; 15 February 1899; Hilchenbach, Province of Westphalia, Kingdom of Prussia, German Empire
- Died: 8 December 1986 (aged 87); Neumünster, Schleswig-Holstein, West Germany
- Military career
- Allegiance: German Empire; Nazi Germany
- Branch: Schutzstaffel
- Service years: 1917–1919; 1936–1945
- Rank: SS-Obersturmbannführer
- Unit: Einsatzgruppe C
- Commands: Einsatzkommando 6

Ernst Emil Heinrich Biberstein (or Bieberstein) (15 February 1899 – 8 December 1986) was an SS-Obersturmbannführer (Lieutenant Colonel), member of the SD and commanding officer of Einsatzkommando 6. He was born Ernst Schzymanowski or Szymanowski.

== Early life ==
Ernst Biberstein was born Ernst Szymanowski in Hilchenbach, Province of Westphalia. His early education was at Mülheim. He was a private in World War I from March 1917 to 1919. Upon discharge, he studied theology from March 1919 through 1921 and became a Protestant pastor on 28 December 1924. In 1935 he entered the Reichskirchenministerium and was later transferred to the Reichssicherheitshauptamt.

== Nazism ==
Biberstein joined the Nazi Party in 1926 and the SS on 13 September 1936 (membership number 272692). From March through October 1940 he was again a soldier. On 1 June 1941, Biberstein became head of the Gestapo office in Opole. There, he was complicit in the deportations of Jews. The same year, he changed his surname from Szymanowski to the supposedly original name, Biberstein. After the assassination of Reinhard Heydrich, he was assigned command of Einsatzkommando 6 in June 1942.

== Nuremberg and later life ==
Biberstein was a defendant at the Einsatzgruppen Trial during the Nuremberg Trials. His trial began in September 1947 and ended on 9 April 1948. At his arraignment, along with all other defendants, he pleaded not guilty on all charges. Einsatzkommando 6 was charged with having executed some two to three thousand people. It was brought to light that at Rostow, Biberstein had personally supervised the execution of some 50 to 60 people. The victims were stripped of valuable articles (and partially of clothes), gassed, and left in a mass grave. He was also present at executions where victims were made to kneel at the edge of a pit and killed with a submachine gun.

Biberstein was ultimately found guilty and sentenced to death by hanging. His sentence was reviewed by the "Peck Panel", and later commuted to life imprisonment in 1951. Biberstein was denied parole several times. In 1958, the Federal Foreign Office filed parole applications on the behalf of all four inmates still serving time in Landsberg Prison. Biberstein was denied parole, but the board unanimously voted for his life sentence and that of the other three to be commuted to time served. The commutations became official on 6 May 1958, and Biberstein was released three days later. He temporarily returned to the clergy, and died in 1986 in Neumünster.

== In media ==
Biberstein was portrayed in the 1978 NBC Holocaust television miniseries by Edward Hardwicke.
