= Hans Ehlich =

Hans Ehlich (born 1 July 1901, in Leipzig – 30 March 1991 in Braunschweig) was a doctor and SS-Standartenführer (colonel) of Nazi Germany during World War II. He was the commander of Amtsgruppe III B Volkstum und Volksgesundheit in the Sicherheitsdienst (SD) in occupied Poland.

== Career ==
Hans Ehlich was the oldest of five children. His father, an engineer, took up a new job in Heilbronn in 1905 for professional reasons, so the family moved there in the same year. In 1911, the family moved to Chemnitz. Ehlich graduated from high school in Chemnitz in 1920 and then began to study medicine and dentistry in Leipzig and Würzburg.

Around 1923, Ehlich became involved with various right wing movements, and took part in preparations for Hitler's November putsch in 1923 in Munich. After passing his medical exams, Ehlich took up a position in 1927 as a physician in the City Hospital in Johannstadt, Dresden. He joined the Nazi Party on 1 December 1931. In February 1932, he opened a private medical practice.

Ehlich joined the SS in June 1932 as a candidate, where he worked as a doctor and finally joined in 1934. In April 1933, Ehlich moved to Sebnitz and accepted an offer to join the civil service in the summer of 1935. Here he became as a government medical councilor breed officer in the health department of the Saxon Ministry of the Interior. At the same time, he became an employee of the Racial Policy Office of the NSDAP.

== Wartime ==
At the "Intelligence action", the by the "Einsatzgruppen der Sicherheitspolizei" at the Raid on Poland, Ehlich was taken in on September/October 1939 as a member of Task Force V. In a meeting of the head of the RSHA Reinhard Heydrich on 30 January 1940, it was stipulated that according to the proposal of Ehlich and Eichmann in favor of the Baltic and Volhynia Germans, 160,000 Poles and Jews from the annexed Polish territories should be deported to the General Government. Until mid-March 1940, however, only 40,000 people were deported.

Shortly before end of war in Berlin, the remaining officers in the RSHA, including Ehlich destroyed incriminating documents and established new identities. In Flensburg, Ehlich worked until 13 May 1945 with the press agency of the acting German government of Admiral Dönitz. On 23 May 1945 all of its members were arrested. Ehlich was able to avoid arrest. However, in July 1945 British investigators finally caught up with him and other leaders of the former RSHA.

== Post-war ==
After being released from internment, Ehlich again practised as a physician. In October 1948, he was condemned as a former member of the SS, defined at Nuremberg as being a criminal organization, and sentenced to one year and nine months in prison. Since the punishment was considered time already served, Ehlich was able to establish himself in Braunschweig as a physician. Several preliminary investigations in the sixties did not lead to further prosecution. Ehlich worked and continued to live in Braunschweig, where he died on 30 March 1991.
