= Paul Blobel =

German SS officer, Holocaust perpetrator and convicted war criminal (1894–1951)

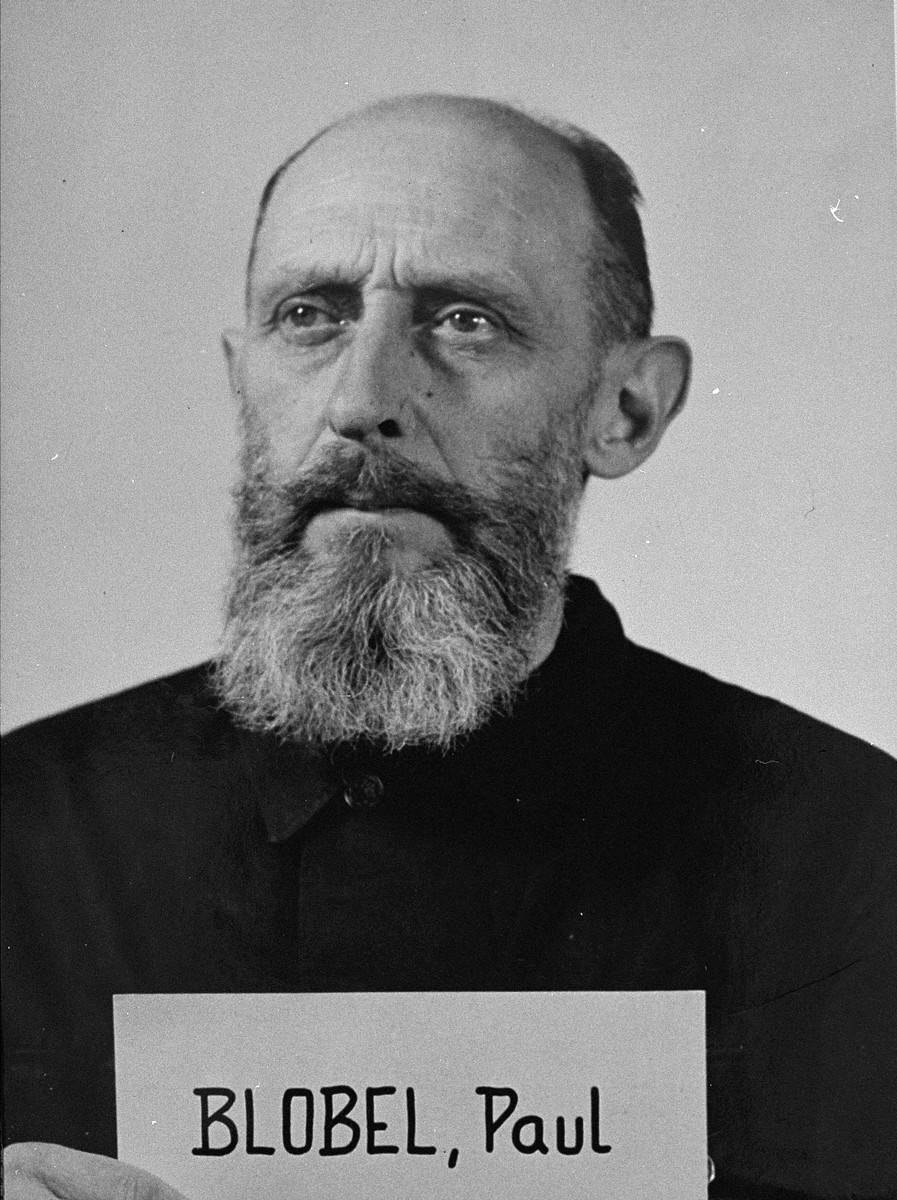
- Blobel in 1947
- Born: 13 August 1894; Potsdam, Brandenburg, Prussia, German Empire
- Died: 7 June 1951 (aged 56); Landsberg am Lech, Bavaria, West Germany
- Known for: Bila Tserkva massacre; Babi Yar massacre; Sonderaktion 1005
- Status: Executed by hanging
- Motive: Nazism
- Convictions: Crimes against humanity War crimes Membership in a criminal organization
- Trial: Einsatzgruppen Trial
- Penalty: Death

Details
- Victims: 60,000+
- Span of crimes: June 1941 – 1944
- Country: Poland, Ukraine, and Yugoslavia
- SS career
- Allegiance: Nazi Germany
- Branch: Schutzstaffel
- Rank: SS-Standartenführer
- Units: Einsatzgruppe C
- Commands: Sonderkommando 4a Sonderaktion 1005

Paul Wilhelm Hermann Blobel (13 August 1894 – 7 June 1951) was a German Sicherheitsdienst (SD) commander and convicted war criminal who played a leading role in the Holocaust. He organised the Babi Yar massacre, the largest massacre of the Second World War at Babi Yar ravine in September 1941, pioneered the use of the gas van, and, following re-assignment, developed the gas chambers for the extermination camps. From late 1942 onwards, he led Sonderaktion 1005, wherein millions of bodies were exhumed at sites across Eastern Europe in an effort to erase all evidence of the Holocaust and specifically of Operation Reinhard. After the war, Blobel was tried at the Einsatzgruppen trial and sentenced to death. He was executed in 1951.

== Early life ==
Blobel was born in Potsdam into a Protestant family of small trade artisans, who moved to Remscheid in 1899. He graduated schooling there without Abitur and between 1908 and 1911, Blobel completed training as a carpenter and bricklayer. In 1913, he began attending Barmen's Kunstgewerbeschule (a precursor to the University of Wuppertal), studying architecture.

During World War I, Blobel enlisted in the Imperial German Army, becoming part of a pioneer battalion deployed on the Western Front, learning the use of flamethrowers, Minenwerfer, and incendiary explosives. By the time he was discharged in 1918 to the military command in Lennep, he had reached the rank of Vizefeldwebel or Unteroffizier and was highly decorated, having received an Iron Cross first class.

After the war, Blobel finished his studies and around 1920, he gained a position as construction manager in the Solingen office of Franz Perlewitz, with a focus on industrial and residential buildings. Blobel married in 1921 and in late 1922, he began studying at Kunstakademie Düsseldorf. Upon his graduation in 1925, Blobel became a freelance architect, building a house for his family in Solingen's Schaberg district the following year.

During the Great Depression, Blobel, by then a father of two sons, stopped receiving commission work, and received welfare while registered as unemployed between 1930 and 1933, although he had temporary employment at Solingen's administrative office.

== SS career ==
Blobel joined the Sturmabteilung (SA), the paramilitary wing of the Nazi Party in May 1931. Despite stating during his later post-war trial that he joined the Social Democratic Party of Germany (SPD) in October 1931, claiming that the SA at the time was "not political" but rather considered a "social club, whose goals [he] did not find contrary to the SPD", records showed that he had in fact joined the Nazi Party on 1 October of the same year and become a member of the Schutzstaffel (SS) by 1 December. Additionally, he was already known to have ties with the Sicherheitsdienst (SD), the Nazi Party's intelligence service, shortly after entering the SS, while the organisation was still in its early stages, contributing to his rapid promotions within the SD.

In March 1932, Blobel became deputy SD district leader in the Solingen-Remscheid-Wuppertal triangle of Gau Düsseldorf. In August 1933, he was put in charge of the 20. SS-Standarte in western Gau Düsseldorf, an area equivalent to the modern-day Regierungsbezirk Düsseldorf. Through this position, Blobel became a policeman of Düsseldorf's Gestapo office, initially only as an honorary title, but he eventually started going on patrols as an auxiliary police officer. His SD personnel file highlighted Blobel's loyalty and zeal to Nazism, making mention of an incident in which Blobel sustained heavy cranial injuries after getting into a fight with "public enemies" during an ID check. In mid-1934, Blobel received leadership of sector V in the upper Düsseldorf-West area, and a promotion from Oberscharführer to Hauptsturmführer. He was responsible for data collection in the region on Jewish organisations for the regional Judenkartei, which came into use in the mass arrest of Jews following the 1938 November pogroms.

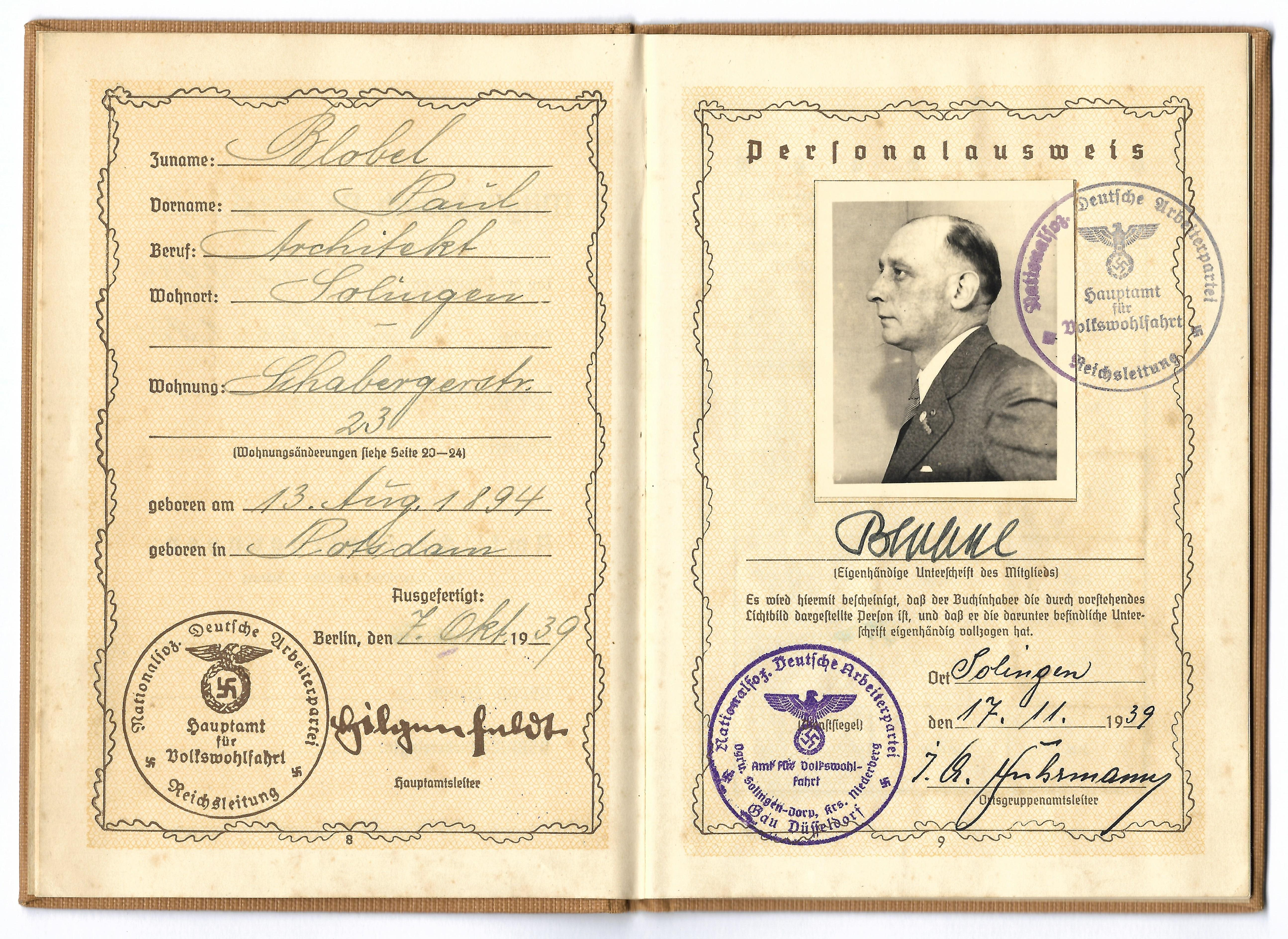
Early war-time ID issued to Paul Blobel by the "Volkswohlfahrt", Nazi Germany's welfare organization

In early 1941, shortly before Operation Barbarossa, the Reich Security Main Office assigned Blobel as the leader of SS-Sonderkommando 4a of Einsatzgruppe C to take part in the invasion in Reichskommissariat Ukraine. Along with the Order Police battalions, the Einsatzgruppen were responsible for massacres of Jews behind the Wehrmacht lines in the Soviet Union. The murder campaign included all political and racial undesirables. In August 1941, Blobel was put in charge of creating a Nazi ghetto in Zhytomyr to enclose around 3,000 Jews who were murdered a month later.

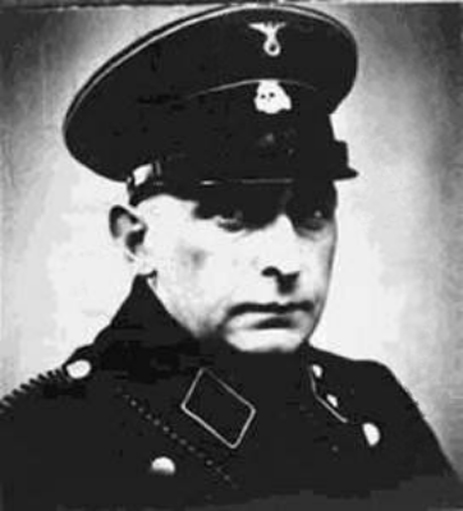
Blobel in SS uniform

On 10 or 11 August 1941, Friedrich Jeckeln ordered him, on behalf of Adolf Hitler, to exterminate the entire Jewish population. On 22 August 1941, the SS-Sonderkommando murdered Jewish women and children at Bila Tserkva with the consent of Field Marshal Walther von Reichenau, commander of the 6th Army. SS-Obersturmführer August Häfner testified at his own trial in the 1960s:

The Wehrmacht had already dug a grave. The children were brought along in a tractor. The Ukrainians were standing around trembling. The children were taken down from the tractor. They were lined up along the top of the grave and shot so that they fell into it. The Ukrainians did not aim at any particular part of the body. ... The wailing was indescribable.

Blobel, in conjunction with Reichenau's and Friedrich Jeckeln's units, organised the Babi Yar massacre in late September 1941 in Kyiv, where 33,771 Jews were murdered. In November 1941, Blobel received and activated the first gas vans at Poltava.

Blobel was officially relieved of his command on 13 January 1942 for health reasons due to alcoholism, although this was an elaborate cover. Whilst in the hospital, Blobel was visited by Reinhard Heydrich and tasked with a top secret Reich matter that was presumably suspended upon the fatal shooting of Heydrich in Prague by British-trained Czech partisans. During this time, according to Dieter Wisliceny, Blobel developed the concept of the gas chambers for the extermination camps in Poland. In June 1942 Blobel was contacted by Heinrich Müller, Chief of the Gestapo and secretly placed in charge of Sonderaktion 1005 with his official cover being SD Chief of the City of Nuremberg. This secret task consisted of the destruction of the evidence of all Nazi atrocities in Eastern Europe, beginning at Chelmno and continuing on to Sobibor Extermination Camp, Auschwitz, the camps in the Independent State of Croatia, the Baltic States, Serbia and eventually back to the site of the Babi Yar Massacre in Ukraine. This entailed exhumation of mass graves, then incinerating the bodies. Blobel developed efficient disposal techniques such as alternating layers of bodies with firewood on a frame of iron rails.

In October 1944 was assigned to Slovenian Styria to combat Yugoslav partisans as part of Bandenbekämpfung. Gitta Sereny related the conversation about Blobel she once had with one-time Chief of the Church Information Branch at the Reich Security Head Office, Albert Hartl.

Hartl had told me of a summer evening—that same hot summer in 1942—in Kyiv when he was invited to dine with the local Higher SS Police Chief and Brigadeführer, Max Thomas. A fellow guest, SS Colonel Paul Blobel, had driven him to the general's weekend dacha. "At one moment—it was just getting dark," said Hartl, "we were driving past a long ravine. I noticed strange movements of the earth. Clumps of earth rose into the air as if by their own propulsion—and there was smoke; it was like a low-toned volcano; as if there was burning lava just beneath the earth. Blobel laughed, made a gesture with his arm pointing back along the road and ahead, all along the ravine—the ravine of Babi Yar—and said, 'Here lie my thirty-thousand Jews.'"

Blobel went on sick leave in December 1944, spending three months at a hospital in Marburg an der Drau until April 1945, when he was ordered to report to Ernst Kaltenbrunner's office in Berlin for further commands. He was briefly stationed in Salzburg before being captured with his unit in Rastatt in May 1945.

== Trial and conviction ==
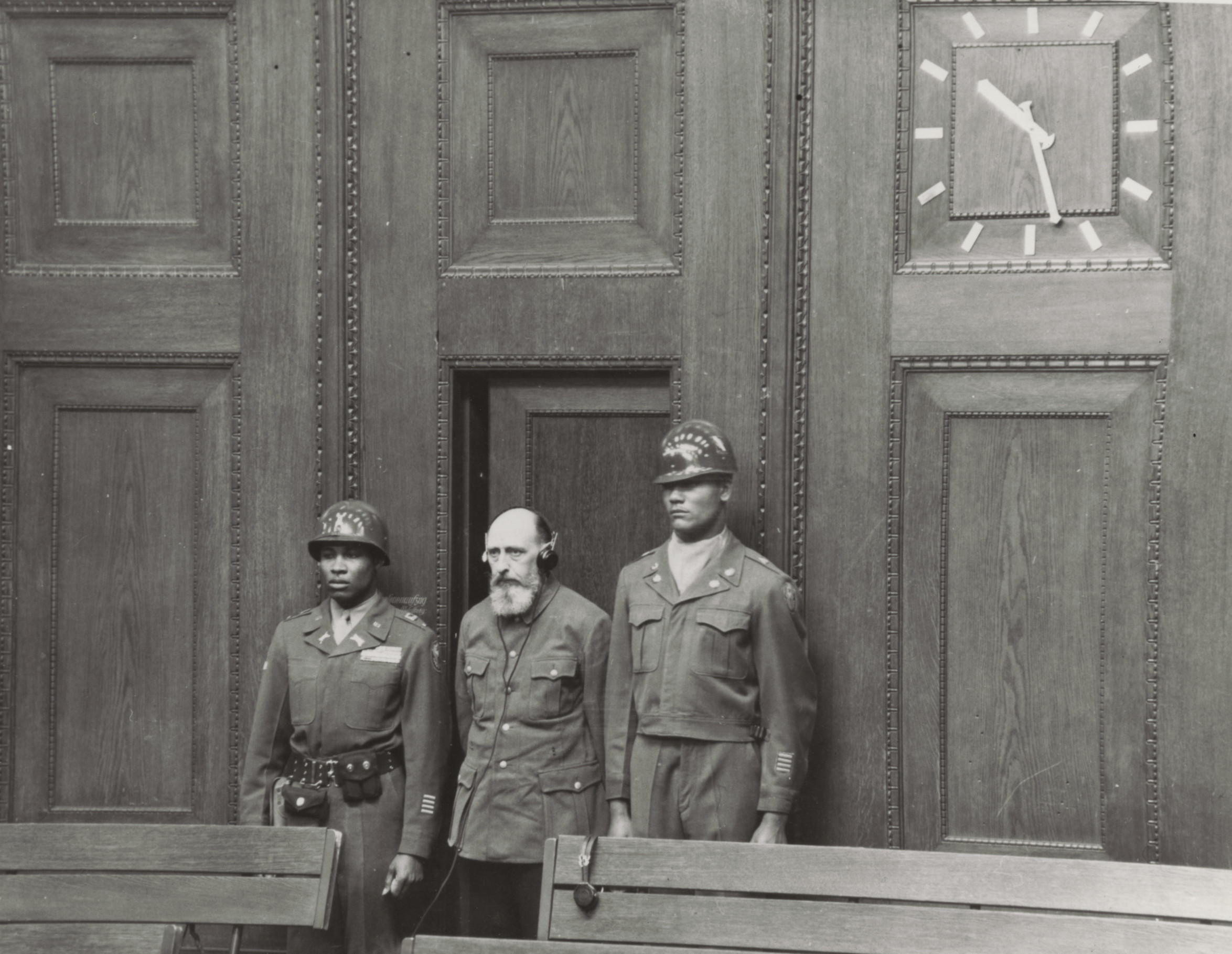
Blobel is sentenced to death at the Einsatzgruppen trial, 10 April 1948.

Over 59,018 killings are attributable to Blobel, however he personally estimated to have killed 10,000–15,000 people. He was later sentenced to death by the U.S. Nuremberg Military Tribunal in the Einsatzgruppen trial. He was hanged at Landsberg Prison shortly after midnight on 7 June 1951.

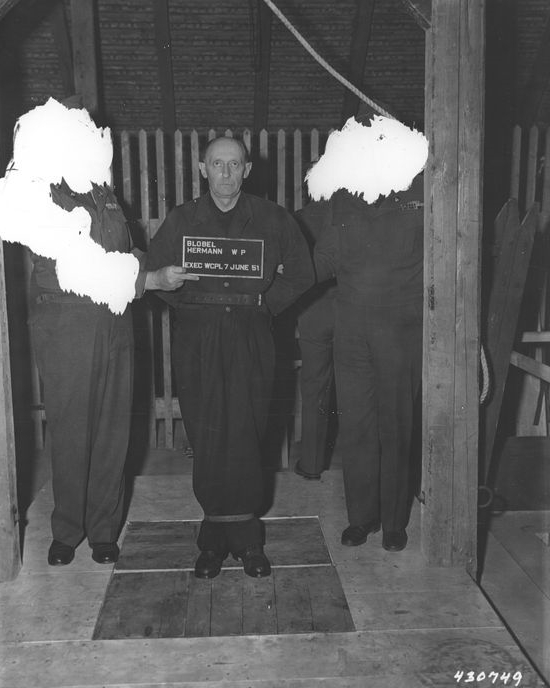
Blobel just before his execution

== In the media ==
- Blobel was portrayed by actor T. P. McKenna in the 1978 miniseries Holocaust.
- Blobel is an historical character in Herman Wouk's book War and Remembrance. He was portrayed by actor Kenneth Colley in the television adaptation of the book.
- Blobel appears as a historical character in the Philip Kerr novel A Man Without Breath.
