= Otto Ohlendorf =

German SS officer and Holocaust perpetrator (1907–1951)

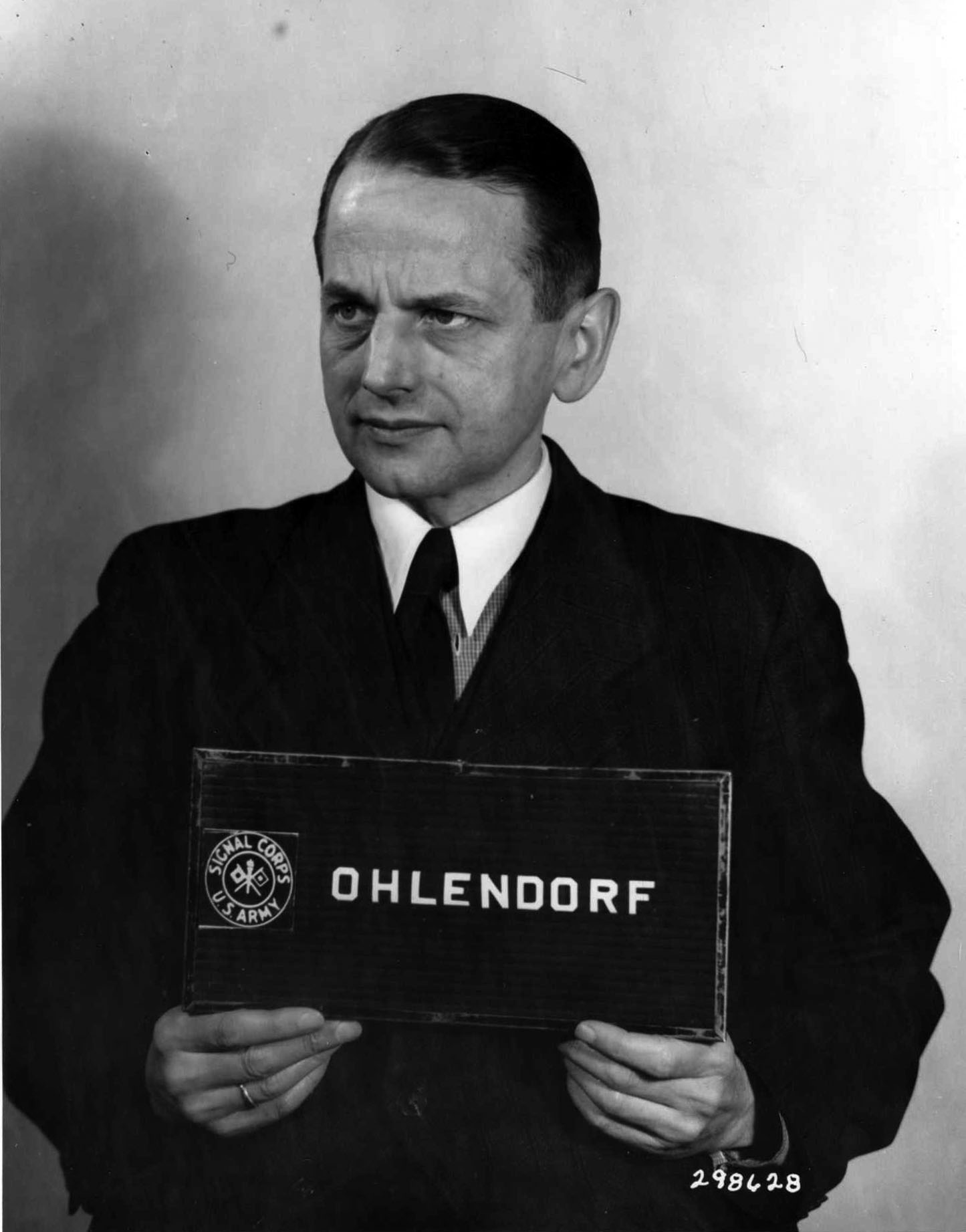
- Mugshot for the Nuremberg Military Tribunal (1 March 1948)
- Born: 4 February 1907; Hoheneggelsen, Province of Hanover, Prussia, German Empire
- Died: 7 June 1951 (aged 44) (Note: "Five death sentences were confirmed: the sentence against Oswald Pohl, as well as those passed against the leaders of the Mobile Killing Units, Paul Blobel, Werner Braune, Erich Neumann, and Otto Ohrlendorf...In the early morning hours of 7 June, the Nazi criminals were hanged in the Landsberg prison courtyard."); Landsberg Prison, Landsberg am Lech, West Germany
- Cause of death: Execution by hanging
- Convictions: Crimes against humanity War crimes Membership in a criminal organization
- Trial: Einsatzgruppen trial
- Penalty: Death

Details
- Victims: 90,000+
- Span of crimes: June 1941 – July 1942
- Country: Ukraine and Russia
- Targets: Slavs, Jews, Romas, and Communists
- Date apprehended: 23 May 1945
- SS career
- Allegiance: Nazi Germany
- Branch: Schutzstaffel
- Rank: SS-Gruppenführer
- Commands: Einsatzgruppe D; Dept III, RSHA

Otto Ohlendorf (German pronunciation: [ˈɔtoː ˈʔoːləndɔʁf]; 4 February 1907 – 7 June 1951) was a German SS functionary and Holocaust perpetrator during the Nazi era. An economist by education, he was head of the Sicherheitsdienst (SD) Inland, responsible for intelligence and security within Germany. In 1941, Ohlendorf was appointed the commander of Einsatzgruppe D, which perpetrated mass murder in Moldova, south Ukraine, the Crimea and, during 1942, the North Caucasus. He was tried at the Einsatzgruppen Trial, sentenced to death, and executed by hanging in 1951.

== Life and education ==
Born in Hoheneggelsen (today part of Söhlde; then in the Kingdom of Prussia), Otto Ohlendorf came into the world as part of "a farming family". He joined the Nazi Party in 1925 and the SS in 1926. Ohlendorf studied economics and law at the University of Leipzig and the University of Göttingen, and by 1930 was already giving lectures at several economic institutions. In 1931, Ohlendorf was awarded a two-semester scholarship to the University of Pavia. According to historian Alan Steinweis, Ohlendorf was one of the few Nazis who possessed two doctoral degrees. In 1933 he obtained the position of a research directorship in the Kiel Institute for the World Economy. Ohlendorf was active in the National Socialist Students' League in both Kiel and Göttingen and taught at the Nazi Party's school in Berlin. He participated in major debates between the SS, the German Labour Front, and the Quadrennial Organization on economic policy. By 1938 he was also manager in the Trade section of the Reich Chamber of Commerce (Reichswirtschaftskammer). Historian Christian Ingrao quips that for Ohlendorf, Nazism was a "quest for race" in the historical continuum, and even though he never stated it that way, his faith in Germandom was akin to that of his fellow SS intellectuals.

== SS career ==
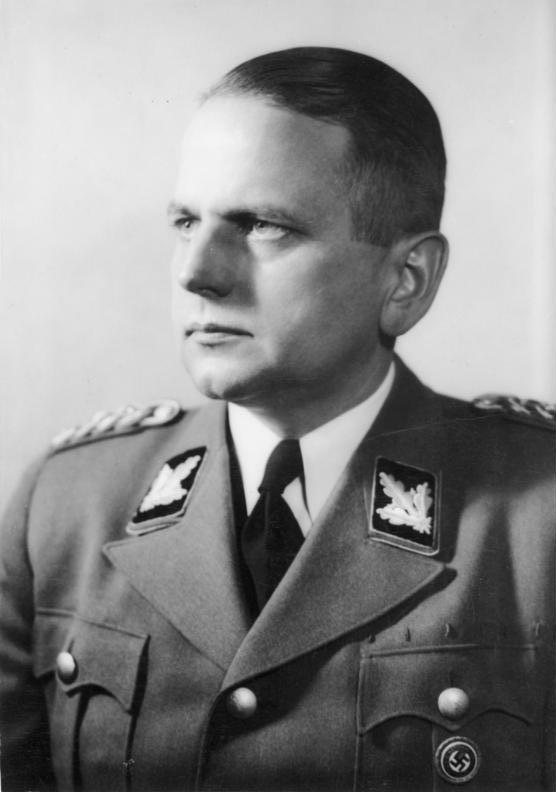
Ohlendorf in November 1943

Ohlendorf joined the SD in 1936 and became an economic consultant of the organisation. Like other academics such as Helmut Knochen and Franz Six, Ohlendorf had been recruited by SD talent-scouts. Attached to the SS with the rank of SS-Hauptsturmführer, by 1939 he had reached the rank of SS-Standartenführer and was appointed as head of Amt III (SD-Inland) of the Reich Security Main Office (RSHA), a position he kept until 1945. His role in collecting intelligence from his secret-police agents was disliked by some of the Nazi leadership. Reichsführer-SS Heinrich Himmler once characterized Ohlendorf as "an unbearable Prussian" who was "without humour". Nonetheless, Ohlendorf was instrumental as a member of the SD in shaping Nazi economic doctrine, which became "increasingly virulent as the war progressed" as he attempted to mould the economy "in an ethnic context". It was Ohlendorf's responsibility as head of the SD-Inland to collect data and scientifically to examine social, cultural, and economic issues, assembling reports to give to his superiors in the Nazi government. Routine public-opinion surveys—which were under the purview of Ohlendorf and of SS-Major Reinhard Höhn—constituted some of these reports. These public-opinion polls on the social climate of Nazi Germany were both unpopular and controversial.

In June 1941, Reinhard Heydrich appointed Ohlendorf as commander of Einsatzgruppe D, which operated in southern Ukraine and Crimea. Joining the Einsatzgruppen was an unappealing prospect and Ohlendorf refused twice before his eventual appointment. Transfers from the RSHA to the Einsatzgruppen were in part due to personnel shortages but also to keep the initial killing-operations confined to those who already knew the details, such as Ohlendorf, Arthur Nebe, and Paul Blobel. Einsatzgruppe D was the smallest of the task forces, but was supplemented by Romanians along their way through the killing fields of Bessarabia, southern Ukraine, and the Caucasus. Additional manpower for Einsatzgruppe D came from Ukrainian auxiliary-police formations. Supporting military operations, Ohlendorf's group was attached to the Eleventh Army. (Note: One task which Ohlendorf disdained was providing guards for the harvest at the behest of Army commanders, who wanted to prevent the Romanians from consuming any of the goods.) Ohlendorf's Einsatzgruppe in particular was responsible for the 13 December 1941 massacre at Simferopol, where at least 14,300 people, mostly Jews, were killed. Over 90,000 murders throughout Ukraine and the Caucasus are attributed to Ohlendorf's unit. (Note: During the Einsatzgruppen trial at Nuremberg, Ohlendorf stated that he tried to mitigate any "unnecessary agitation" for the victims.)

Ohlendorf disliked the use of the oft-employed Genickschuß (shot to the back of the neck) and preferred to line up victims and fire at them from a greater distance; this method allegedly alleviated personal responsibility for the individual murderers. All forms of contact between the firing squads and victims were limited—per Ohlendorf's insistence—until the last moments before the killing started, and up to three rifleman were allocated to each person about to be shot. To ensure the group-killing mentality, Ohlendorf forbade any commando from taking individual actions and explicitly instructed his men not to take any of the victims' valuables. One of Ohlendorf's most trusted "proper" military-style murderers, Haupsturmführer Lothar Heimbach, once exclaimed, "A man is the lord over life and death when he gets an order to shoot three hundred children—and he kills at least one hundred fifty himself." (Note: Justifying the murder of children, Ohlendorf stated, "the children were people who would grow up and surely being the children of parents who had been killed, they would constitute a danger no smaller than their parents.")

Many of the killing operations were personally overseen by Ohlendorf, who wanted to ensure they were "military in character and humane under the circumstances". The number of persons killed under the leadership of Einsatzgruppen commanders such as Ohlendorf are "staggering", despite the use of varying murder techniques. On 1 August 1941, Einsatzgruppen commanders, including Ohlendorf, received instructions from Gestapo chief Heinrich Müller to keep headquarters (Hitler especially) informed of their progress in the East; Müller also encouraged the speedy delivery of photographs showing the results of these operations. During September 1941, Ohlendorf's group slaughtered 22,467 Jews and communists at Nikolayev near the Black Sea port of Odessa.

Due to the Wehrmacht's insistence that Ukraine's agricultural production was needed to sustain its military campaign, Ohlendorf was asked by the army during October 1941 to refrain from killing some of the Jewish farmers (Note: In agreement with the army,' Ohlendorf testified at his trial, "we had excluded from the executions a large number of Jews - the farmers. The Wehrmacht had wanted to make sure agricultural production would continue in the Ukraine, Russia's breadbasket, to sustain further campaigns.")—a request he honored—but one which earned him Himmler's contempt. (Note: Ohlendorf complained about this, stating: "Himmler was incensed to learn that the Jewish farmers had been spared. [...] I was reproached for this measure.") Nonetheless, just a month prior in September 1941, Ohlendorf announced to his men that "from now on the Jewish question is going to be solved and that means liquidation". From that month forward, the Einsatzgruppen had begun the process of systematically shooting not just men but women and children, a transition that historian Peter Longerich terms "the decisive step on the way towards a policy of racial annihilation".

Between February and March 1942, Himmler ordered that gas vans should be used to murder women and children so as to reduce the strain on the men, but Ohlendorf reported that many of the Einsatzkommandos refused to utilize the vans since burying the victims proved an "ordeal" afterwards. (Note: Historian Martin Gilbert reported that in front of the Nuremberg tribunal, Ohlendorf described the use of gas vans for killing operations as "unpleasant" and that the Einsatzkommandos disliked dealing with the bodies.) Gas-van killing operations were usually conducted at night to keep the population from witnessing the macabre affair. After the victims' deaths, Jewish Sonderkommandos were forced to unload the bodies, clean the excrement from inside the van's gas chamber, and once the clean-up was complete, were themselves immediately shot. As far as Ohlendorf was concerned, the gas vans were impracticable for the scale of killing demanded by Himmler; namely, since they could only kill between fifteen and twenty-five persons at a time.

Historian Donald Bloxham characterises Ohlendorf as a bureaucrat who was trying to "prove himself in the field". Another historian, Mark Mazower, describes Ohlendorf as a "gloomy, driven, self-righteous Prussian". His commitment to the Nazi cause kept him in Ukraine longer than any of his comrades, and while he may have disliked the political direction in which Germany was headed, he never registered complaints about murdering Jews. He did, however, express misgivings about the barbarity and sadism being meted out by the Romanian units that accompanied the Einsatzgruppen in their murderous tasks, since they were not only leaving a trail of corpses in their wake, they were also pillaging and raping in the process. He also complained about the Romanians driving thousands of frail elderly persons and children from Bessarabia and Bukovina—all incapable of work—into German-held regions, whom Ohlendorf's men forced back into Romanian territory, but not without killing a significant percentage of them as a result.

Ohlendorf devoted only four years (1939–1943) of full-time activity to the RSHA, for in 1943, in addition to his other jobs, he became a deputy director-general (German: Stellvertreter des Staatssekretärs und Ministerialdirektor) in the Reich Ministry of Economic Affairs (German: Reichswirtschaftsministerium). Sometime in November 1944, he was promoted to SS–Gruppenführer. Believing their expertise invaluable, Ohlendorf, Ludwig Erhard, and other experts concerned themselves with how to stabilize German currency after the prospective end of the war. Hoping to salvage the reputation of the SD, Ohlendorf offered his services in the hopes that he could shape the postwar reconstruction of Germany, but along "National Socialist lines", remaining convinced—as was Admiral Karl Dönitz (who would make Ohlendorf his de facto economics minister under Albert Speer in the Flensburg Government of May 1945)—that some form of Nazism would ultimately survive. (Note: According to Volker Ulllrich,"It was considered a given that Speer would be part of the new government [under Dönitz in Flensburg]. [...] Now Speer was up for the post of economics and production minister. [...] Otto Ohlendorf, however, was the man who was actually supposed to run the economics ministry. [...] Ohlendorf had been a ministerial director and deputy state secretary in the economics ministry under Walther Funk. In this capacity, his duties included planning for the postwar economy, which no doubt qualified him in Speer's eyes for his new job in Flensburg. [...] Ohlendorf was not content to offer his services as an economic expert, and he proposed to Dönitz that personnel from the Reich Main Security Office that had moved with him to the 'northern realm' could serve as the basis for a new German intelligence body.")

In May 1945, Ohlendorf participated in Himmler's flight from Flensburg. He surrendered to British authorities on 23 May 1945. For several weeks after his arrest, he was carefully interrogated, during which he revealed the criminal nature of the German campaign in the East.

== Nuremberg trials ==
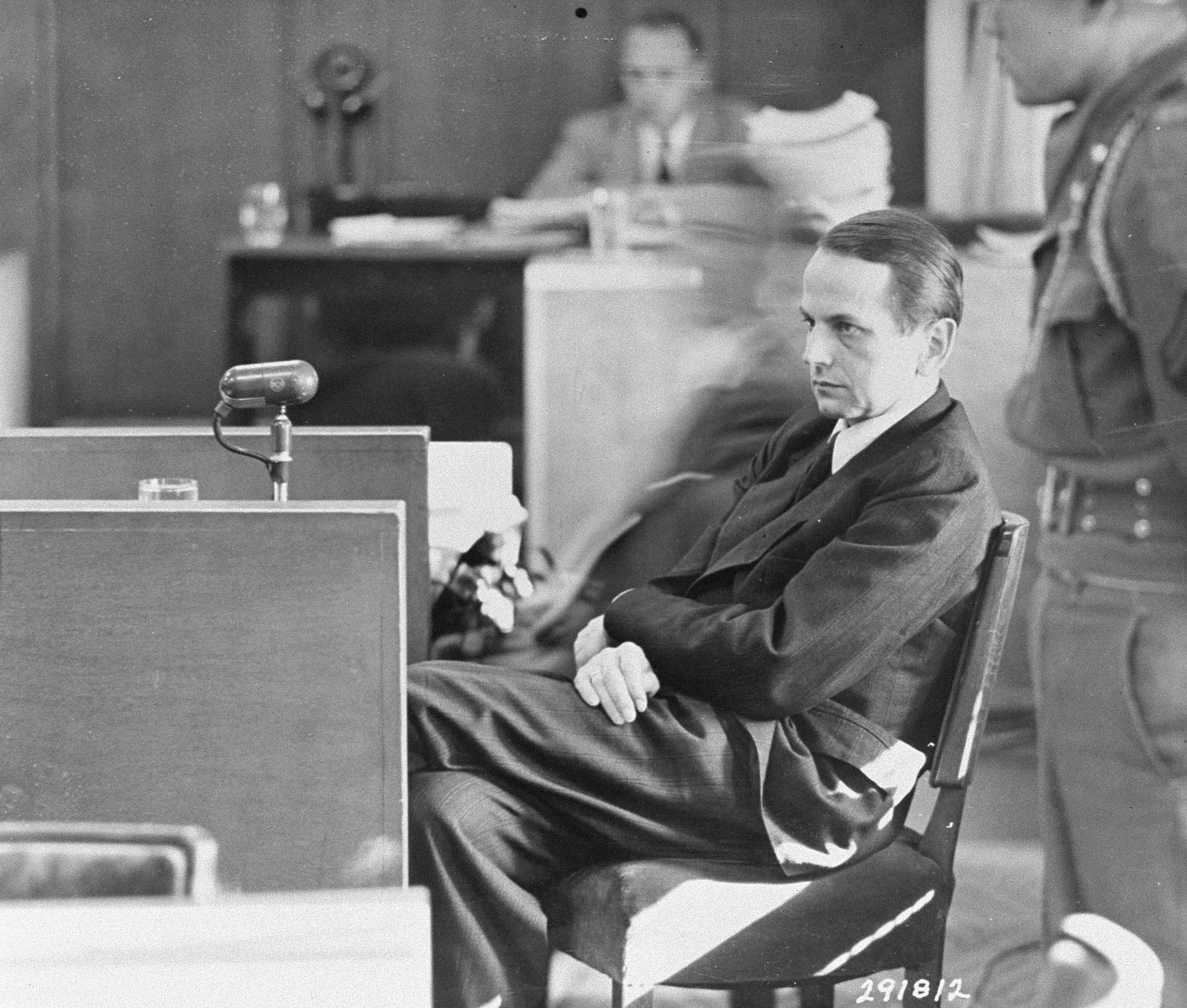
Ohlendorf testifies at the Einsatzgruppen trial, 9 October 1947.

Ohlendorf was called as a witness by the prosecution during the International Military Tribunal at Nuremberg on 3 January 1946. During the subsequent Einsatzgruppen trial, Ohlendorf was the chief defendant, and was also a key witness in the prosecution of other indicted war criminals. Ohlendorf's apparently reliable testimony was attributed to his distaste for the corruption in Nazi Germany and a stubborn commitment to duty. The court examined Ohlendorf concerning Einsatzgruppen operations in particular. At his trial, Ohlendorf insisted that he, as a loyal Nazi, had acted properly and done nothing wrong. He expressed no remorse for his actions, telling prosecutor Ben Ferencz, who was Jewish, afterwards that the Jews of the United States would suffer for what Ferencz had done. He seemed more concerned about the moral strain on those carrying out the murders than those being murdered.

Ohlendorf attempted to present Einsatzgruppen operations in the Soviet area "not as a racist programme for the annihilation of all the Jews ... but as a general liquidation order primarily aimed at 'securing' the newly won territory." Defending his actions, Ohlendorf compared Einsatzgruppen activities to the Biblical Jewish extirpation of its enemies; he likewise claimed that his firing squads were "no worse than the 'press-button killers' who dropped the atom bomb on Japan."

Ohlendorf's defense also claimed that Hitler had ordered the murder of all Jews before the German invasion of the Soviet Union. This order was revealed to be a fabrication many years later by prosecuting attorney and Germany's central office chief to investigate National Socialist crimes at Ludwigsburg, Alfred Streim. (Note: According to Erwin Schulz, one of only two of Ohlendorf's co-defendants to not attest to his version of events, he only received such an order in mid-August 1941. Unlike Ohlendorf, however, Schulz, asserted during his testimony that he was unwilling to kill women and children. Thereafter, he stated he was promptly sent back to Germany by Heydrich after reaching out to him directly. Despite this claim, Einsatzkommando 5 was under Schulz's leadership for a mere six weeks but still managed to murder 12,000 persons. Prior to the invasion, Schulz testified that Heydrich had told him, "That every one should be sure to understand that, in this fight, Jews would definitely take their part and that, in this fight, everything was set at stake, and the one side which gave in would be the one to be overcome. For that reason, all measures had to be taken against the Jews in particular. The experience in Poland had shown this.") Ohlendorf justified the systematic murder as anticipatory self-defense against the mortal threat supposedly posed by Jews, Romas, Communists, and others. He argued that the killing of Jewish children was necessary since they would have grown up to hate Germany. The term he used, "permanent security", was later borrowed by historian A. Dirk Moses in his criticism of the concept of genocide as a categorical mistake. Moses argues that permanent security is an unobtainable goal that, if pursued, inevitably leads to anticipatory attacks that harm civilians, and therefore it "underlies all atrocity crimes and common state practices like aerial bombing and sanctions."

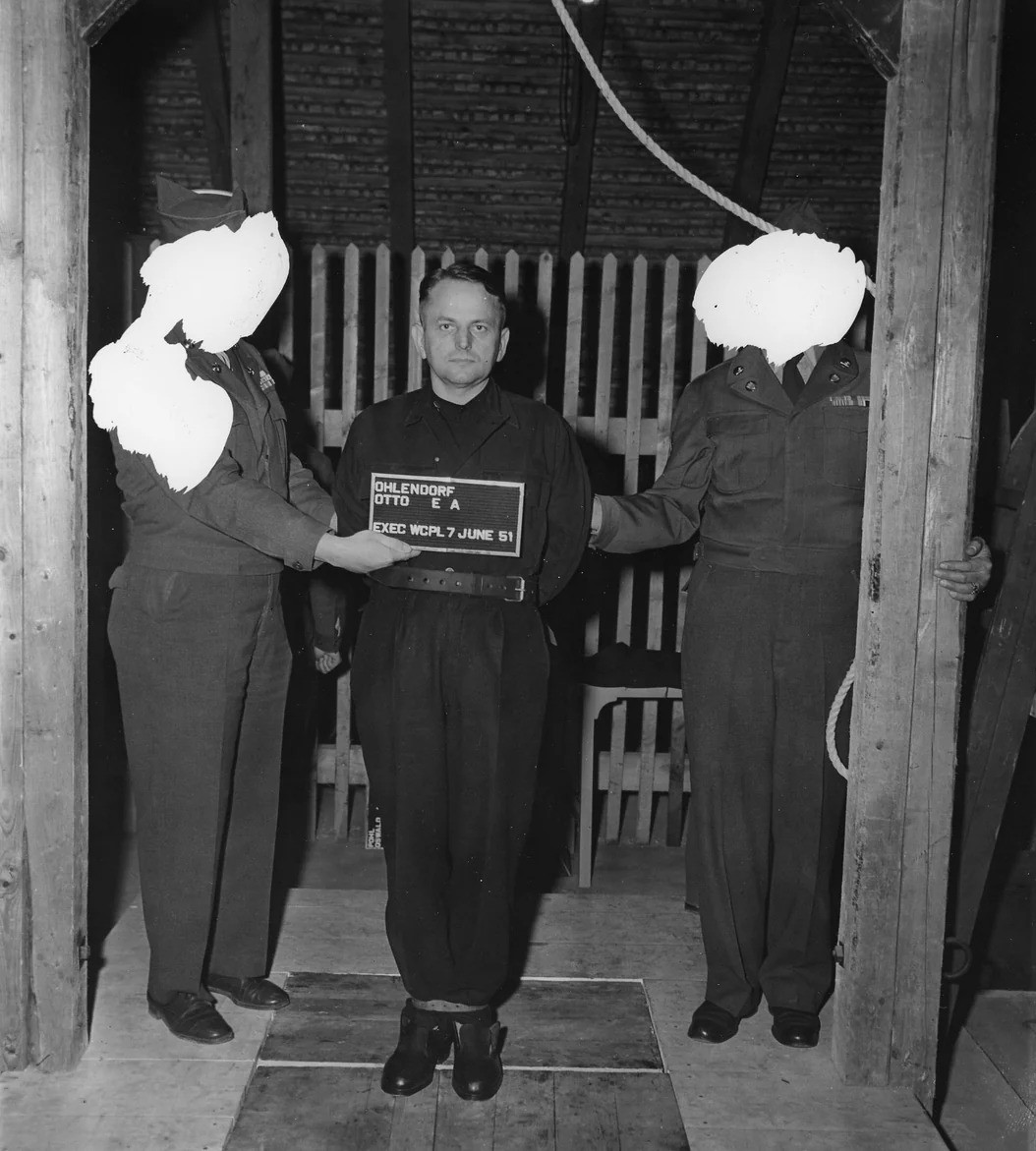
Ohlendorf's moments before his execution

Despite his attempts to establish moral equivalency for atrocities upon the Allies, Otto Ohlendorf was convicted of crimes against humanity and war crimes committed during World War II. He was sentenced to death in April 1948 and spent three years in detention before being hanged at the Landsberg Prison in Bavaria on 7 June 1951.
