= Pervy =

Pervy may refer to:

- Perversion
- Pervy Margreth, the eponymous character of the episode "The New Student" in Invisible Network of Kids
- Pervy Kanal (Channel One in Russia)

== Russian rural localities ==
- Chegem Pervy (Чеге́м Пе́рвый) a 1972 settlement renamed in 2000
- Pervy May in Uchalinsky District of Bashkortostan
- Volchy-Pervy in Volokonovsky District of Belgorod Oblast
