= Afonyevka =

Afonyevka Афоньевка
- Selo
- Location within Belgorod Oblast Location within Russia
- Coordinates: 50°33′N 37°47′E
- Country: Russia
- Region: Belgorod Oblast
- District: Volokonovsky District
- Time zone: UTC+3:00

Afonyevka (Russian: Афоньевка) is a rural locality (a selo) in Volokonovsky District, Belgorod Oblast, Russia. The population was 481 as of 2010. There are 5 streets.

== Geography ==
Afonyevka is located 14 kilometres (8.7 mi) north of Volokonovka (the district's administrative centre) by road. Korovino is the nearest rural locality.
