= Chapelnoye =

Chapelnoye Чапельное
- Selo
- Location within Belgorod Oblast Location within Russia
- Coordinates: 50°30′N 37°42′E
- Country: Russia
- Region: Belgorod Oblast
- District: Volokonovsky District
- Time zone: UTC+3:00

Chapelnoye (Russian: Чапельное) is a rural locality (a selo) in Volokonovsky District, Belgorod Oblast, Russia. The population was 305 as of 2010. There are 4 streets.

== Geography ==
Chapelnoye is located 17 km northwest of Volokonovka (the district's administrative centre) by road. Nina is the nearest rural locality.
