= Malinovo, Volokonovsky District, Belgorod Oblast =

Malinovo Малиново
- Settlement
- Location within Belgorod Oblast Location within Russia
- Coordinates: 50°28′N 37°37′E
- Country: Russia
- Region: Belgorod Oblast
- District: Volokonovsky District
- Time zone: UTC+3:00

Malinovo (Russian: Малиново) is a rural locality (a settlement) in Volokonovsky District, Belgorod Oblast, Russia. The population was 268 as of 2010. There are 4 streets.

== Geography ==
Malinovo is located 21 km west of Volokonovka (the district's administrative centre) by road. Novodevichy and Krasny Pakhar are the nearest rural localities.
