= Novoivanovka, Belgorod Oblast =

Novoivanovka Новоивановка
- Selo
- Location within Belgorod Oblast Location within Russia
- Coordinates: 50°35′N 37°46′E
- Country: Russia
- Region: Belgorod Oblast
- District: Volokonovsky District
- Time zone: UTC+3:00

Novoivanovka (Russian: Новоивановка) is a rural locality (a selo) in Volokonovsky District, Belgorod Oblast, Russia. The population was 171 as of 2010. There are 2 streets.

== Geography ==
Novoivanovka is located 16 kilometres (9.9 mi) north of Volokonovka (the district's administrative centre) by road. Korovino is the nearest rural locality.
