= Shenshinovka =

Shenshinovka Шеншиновка
- Selo
- Location within Belgorod Oblast Location within Russia
- Coordinates: 50°34′N 38°03′E
- Country: Russia
- Region: Belgorod Oblast
- District: Volokonovsky District
- Time zone: UTC+3:00

Shenshinovka (Russian: Шеншиновка) is a rural locality (a selo) in Volokonovsky District, Belgorod Oblast, Russia. The population was 145 as of 2010. There are two streets.

== Geography ==
Shenshinovka is located 24 km northeast of Volokonovka (the district's administrative centre) by road. Repyevka is the nearest rural locality.
