= Yevdokimov, Belgorod Oblast =

Yevdokimov Евдокимов
- Khutor
- Location within Belgorod Oblast Location within Russia
- Coordinates: 50°27′N 37°46′E
- Country: Russia
- Region: Belgorod Oblast
- District: Volokonovsky District
- Time zone: UTC+3:00

Yevdokimov (Russian: Евдокимов) is a rural locality (a khutor) in Volokonovsky District, Belgorod Oblast, Russia. The population was 16 as of 2010. There is 1 street.

== Geography ==
Yevdokimov is located 8 km southwest of Volokonovka (the district's administrative centre) by road. Verkhniye Lubyanki is the nearest rural locality.
