= Golofeyevka =

Golofeyevka Голофеевка
- Selo
- Location within Belgorod Oblast Location within Russia
- Coordinates: 50°21′N 37°56′E
- Country: Russia
- Region: Belgorod Oblast
- District: Volokonovsky District
- Time zone: UTC+3:00

Golofeyevka (Russian: Голофеевка) is a rural locality (a selo) and the administrative center of Golofeyevskoye Rural Settlement, Volokonovsky District, Belgorod Oblast, Russia. The population was 342 as of 2010. There are 4 streets.

== Geography ==
Golofeyevka is located 21 km southeast of Volokonovka (the district's administrative centre) by road. Vladimirovka is the nearest rural locality.
