= Shakhovka =

Shakhovka Шаховка
- Khutor
- Location within Belgorod Oblast Location within Russia
- Coordinates: 50°24′N 37°32′E
- Country: Russia
- Region: Belgorod Oblast
- District: Volokonovsky District
- Time zone: UTC+3:00

Shakhovka (Russian: Шаховка) is a rural locality (a khutor) in Volokonovsky District, Belgorod Oblast, Russia. The population was 275 as of 2010. There are 4 streets.

== Geography ==
Shakhovka is located 31 km southwest of Volokonovka (the district's administrative centre) by road. Bochanka is the nearest rural locality.
