= Bochanka =

Bochanka Бочанка
- Khutor
- Location within Belgorod Oblast Location within Russia
- Coordinates: 50°25′N 37°32′E
- Country: Russia
- Region: Belgorod Oblast
- District: Volokonovsky District
- Time zone: UTC+3:00

Bochanka (Russian: Бочанка) is a rural locality (a khutor) in Volokonovsky District, Belgorod Oblast, Russia. The population was 79 as of 2010. There is 1 street.

== Geography ==
Bochanka is located 34 km southwest of Volokonovka (the district's administrative centre) by road. Volchy-Pervy is the nearest rural locality.
