= Tishanka =

Tishanka Тишанка
- Selo
- Location within Belgorod Oblast Location within Russia
- Coordinates: 50°23′N 37°30′E
- Country: Russia
- Region: Belgorod Oblast
- District: Volokonovsky District
- Time zone: UTC+3:00

Tishanka (Russian: Тишанка) is a rural locality (a selo) and the administrative center of Tishanskoye Rural Settlement, Volokonovsky District, Belgorod Oblast, Russia. The population was 467 as of 2010. There are 4 streets.

== Geography ==
Tishanka is located 34 km southwest of Volokonovka (the district's administrative centre) by road. Novoye is the nearest rural locality.
