= Stary, Belgorod Oblast =

Stary Старый
- Khutor
- Location within Belgorod Oblast Location within Russia
- Coordinates: 50°23′N 37°28′E
- Country: Russia
- Region: Belgorod Oblast
- District: Volokonovsky District
- Time zone: UTC+3:00

Stary (Russian: Старый) is a rural locality (a khutor) in Volokonovsky District, Belgorod Oblast, Russia. The population was 90 as of 2010. There are 3 streets.

== Geography ==
Stary is located 36 km southwest of Volokonovka (the district's administrative centre) by road. Budarki is the nearest rural locality.
