= Novaya Dolina =

Novaya Dolina Новая Долина
- Settlement
- Location within Belgorod Oblast Location within Russia
- Coordinates: 50°33′N 37°36′E
- Country: Russia
- Region: Belgorod Oblast
- District: Volokonovsky District
- Time zone: UTC+3:00

Novaya Dolina (Russian: Новая Долина) is a rural locality (a settlement) in Volokonovsky District, Belgorod Oblast, Russia. The population was 50 as of 2010. There is 1 street.

== Geography ==
Novaya Dolina is located 25 km northwest of Volokonovka (the district's administrative centre) by road. Otradnoye is the nearest rural locality.
