= Oskolishche =

Oskolishche Осколище
- Selo
- Location within Belgorod Oblast Location within Russia
- Coordinates: 50°23′N 37°49′E
- Country: Russia
- Region: Belgorod Oblast
- District: Volokonovsky District
- Time zone: UTC+3:00

Oskolishche (Russian: Осколище) is a rural locality (a selo) in Volokonovsky District, Belgorod Oblast, Russia. The population was 369 as of 2010. There are 3 streets.

== Geography ==
Oskolishche is located 12 km south of Volokonovka (the district's administrative centre) by road. Kozlovka is the nearest rural locality.
