= Davydkin, Belgorod Oblast =

Davydkin Давыдкин
- Khutor
- Location within Belgorod Oblast Location within Russia
- Coordinates: 50°21′N 37°42′E
- Country: Russia
- Region: Belgorod Oblast
- District: Volokonovsky District
- Time zone: UTC+3:00

Davydkin (Russian: Давыдкин) is a rural locality (a khutor) in Volokonovsky District, Belgorod Oblast, Russia. The population was 108 as of 2010. There are 2 streets.

== Geography ==
Davydkin is located 26 km southwest of Volokonovka (the district's administrative centre) by road. Plotovka is the nearest rural locality.
