= Shchepkin, Belgorod Oblast =

Shchepkin Щепкин
- Khutor
- Location within Belgorod Oblast Location within Russia
- Coordinates: 50°31′N 37°57′E
- Country: Russia
- Region: Belgorod Oblast
- District: Volokonovsky District
- Time zone: UTC+3:00

Shchepkin (Russian: Щепкин) is a rural locality (a khutor) in Volokonovsky District, Belgorod Oblast, Russia. The population was 133 as of 2010. There is 1 street.

== Geography ==
Shchepkin is located 13 km northeast of Volokonovka (the district's administrative centre) by road. Pokrovka is the nearest rural locality.
