= Krasnoye Gorodishche =

Krasnoye Gorodishche Красное Городище
- Selo
- Location within Belgorod Oblast Location within Russia
- Coordinates: 50°31′N 38°02′E
- Country: Russia
- Region: Belgorod Oblast
- District: Volokonovsky District
- Time zone: UTC+3:00

Krasnoye Gorodishche (Russian: Красное Городище) is a rural locality (a selo) in Volokonovsky District, Belgorod Oblast, Russia. The population was 175 as of 2010. There are 2 streets.

== Geography ==
Krasnoye Gorodishche is located 20 km northeast of Volokonovka (the district's administrative centre) by road. Uspenka is the nearest rural locality.
