= Pervomaysky, Volokonovsky District, Belgorod Oblast =

Pervomaysky Первомайский
- Khutor
- Location within Belgorod Oblast Location within Russia
- Coordinates: 50°31′N 37°32′E
- Country: Russia
- Region: Belgorod Oblast
- District: Volokonovsky District

Population (2010)
  - Total: 2
- Time zone: UTC+3:00

Pervomaysky (Russian: Первомайский) is a rural locality (a khutor) in Volokonovsky District, Belgorod Oblast, Russia.

== History ==
=== Russian invasion of Ukraine ===
The governor of Belgorod Oblast claimed that one person was killed and another injured in a Ukrainian drone strike in Pervomaysky on July 16, 2025.

== Geography ==
Pervomaysky is located 28 km northwest of Volokonovka (the district's administrative centre) by road. Alexandrovka is the nearest rural locality.

Pervomaysky has 1 street.

== Demographics ==
The population was 2 as of 2010.
