= Krasny Pakhar, Volokonovsky District, Belgorod Oblast =

Krasny Pakhar Красный Пахарь
- Settlement
- Location within Belgorod Oblast Location within Russia
- Coordinates: 50°27′N 37°40′E
- Country: Russia
- Region: Belgorod Oblast
- District: Volokonovsky District
- Time zone: UTC+3:00

Krasny Pakhar (Russian: Красный Пахарь) is a rural locality (a settlement) in Volokonovsky District, Belgorod Oblast, Russia. The population was 62 as of 2010. There is 1 street.

== Geography ==
Krasny Pakhar is located 17 km southwest of Volokonovka (the district's administrative centre) by road. Verkhniye Lubyanki is the nearest rural locality.
