= Staroivanovka =

Staroivanovka Староивановка
- Selo
- Location within Belgorod Oblast Location within Russia
- Coordinates: 50°34′N 37°48′E
- Country: Russia
- Region: Belgorod Oblast
- District: Volokonovsky District
- Time zone: UTC+3:00

Staroivanovka (Russian: Староивановка) is a rural locality (a selo) and the administrative center of Staroivanovsky Rural Settlement, Volokonovsky District, Belgorod Oblast, Russia. The population was 1,117 as of 2010. There are 6 streets.

== Geography ==
Staroivanovka is located 11 km north of Volokonovka (the district's administrative centre) by road. Novorozhdestvenka is the nearest rural locality.
