= Plotva =

Plotva Плотва
- Khutor
- Location within Belgorod Oblast Location within Russia
- Coordinates: 50°33′N 37°54′E
- Country: Russia
- Region: Belgorod Oblast
- District: Volokonovsky District
- Time zone: UTC+3:00

Plotva (Russian: Плотва) is a rural locality (a khutor) in Volokonovsky District, Belgorod Oblast, Russia. The population was 5 as of 2010. There is 1 street.

== Geography ==
Plotva is located 12 km northeast of Volokonovka (the district's administrative centre) by road. Repyevka is the nearest rural locality.
