= Plotovka =

Plotovka Плотовка
- Khutor
- Location within Belgorod Oblast Location within Russia
- Coordinates: 50°19′N 37°45′E
- Country: Russia
- Region: Belgorod Oblast
- District: Volokonovsky District
- Time zone: UTC+3:00

Plotovka (Russian: Плотовка) is a rural locality (a khutor) in Volokonovsky District, Belgorod Oblast, Russia. The population was 81 as of 2010. There are 2 streets.

== Geography ==
Plotovka is located 25 km south of Volokonovka (the district's administrative centre) by road. Blagodatny is the nearest rural locality.
