= Zelyony Klin, Belgorod Oblast =

Zelyony Klin Зелёный Клин
- Khutor
- Location within Belgorod Oblast Location within Russia
- Coordinates: 50°26′N 37°33′E
- Country: Russia
- Region: Belgorod Oblast
- District: Volokonovsky District
- Time zone: UTC+3:00

Zelyony Klin (Russian: Зелёный Клин) is a rural locality (a khutor) in Volokonovsky District, Belgorod Oblast, Russia. The population was 62 as of 2010. There are 2 streets.

== Geography ==
Zelyony Klin is located 30 km west of Volokonovka (the district's administrative centre) by road. Volchya Alexandrovka is the nearest rural locality.
