= Pyatnytsky =

Pyatnytsky (Ukrainian: Пятницький, П'ятницький) is a Ukrainian form of the Russian surname Pyatnitsky (Russian: Пятницкий). Notable people with the surname include:

- Valery Pyatnitsky

== See also ==
- Pyatnitsky (disambiguation)
