= Motovylivka, Kyiv Oblast =

Village in Kyiv Oblast, Ukraine

Motovylivka
- Village
- Ukrainian: Мотовилівка
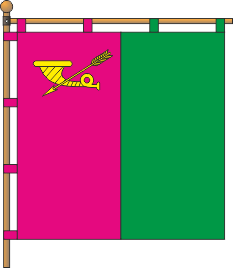
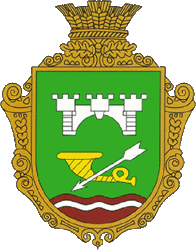
- Flag Coat of arms
- Interactive map of Motovylivka
- Coordinates: 50°9′18″N 30°4′27″E
- Country: Ukraine
- Oblast: Kyiv Oblast
- Raion: Fastiv
- Population: 3,499

Motovylivka (Ukrainian: Мотовилівка) is a Ukrainian village, located in Fastiv Raion of Kyiv Oblast. It belongs to Fastiv urban hromada, one of the hromadas of Ukraine.

In 2001 its population was 3,499. Its area covered 8.16 square kilometres (3.15 sq mi).

== History ==
Motovylivka is an ancient Ukrainian village founded between 1712 and 1714, when the terms of the Treaty of the Pruth (1711) forced Ukrainian Cossacks from Great Motovylivka (subjects of Моsкоia) to move to the left bank of the Stuhna.

On 18 November 1918, the Battle of Motovylivka was fought around the railway station.

The name Chervona Motovylivka was established in 1940. Previous names were Chernecha Motovylivka, Kazenna Motovylivka and Kamenevo.

In April 1917 one of the first sections of Prosvita society in Fastivschyna was founded.

== Notables ==
- Valery Pyatnitsky (born 1962) - Ukrainian politician and statesman. Government's Commissioner for European Integration.
- Sergiy Bei, UGS, UNDL ( 1989 - 1991) vise- prezudent UNKP( 1993- 1996).
