= Pyatnitsky =

Pyatnitsky (masculine), Pyatnitskaya (feminine), or Pyatnitskoye (neuter) may refer to:

- Pyatnitsky (surname) (Pyatnitskaya), Russian last name
- Pyatnitsky Choir, Russian musical group
- Pyatnitsky (inhabited locality) (Pyatnitskaya, Pyatnitskoye), several inhabited localities in Russia
