= Fastiv =

City in Kyiv Oblast, Ukraine

Fastiv Фастів
- City
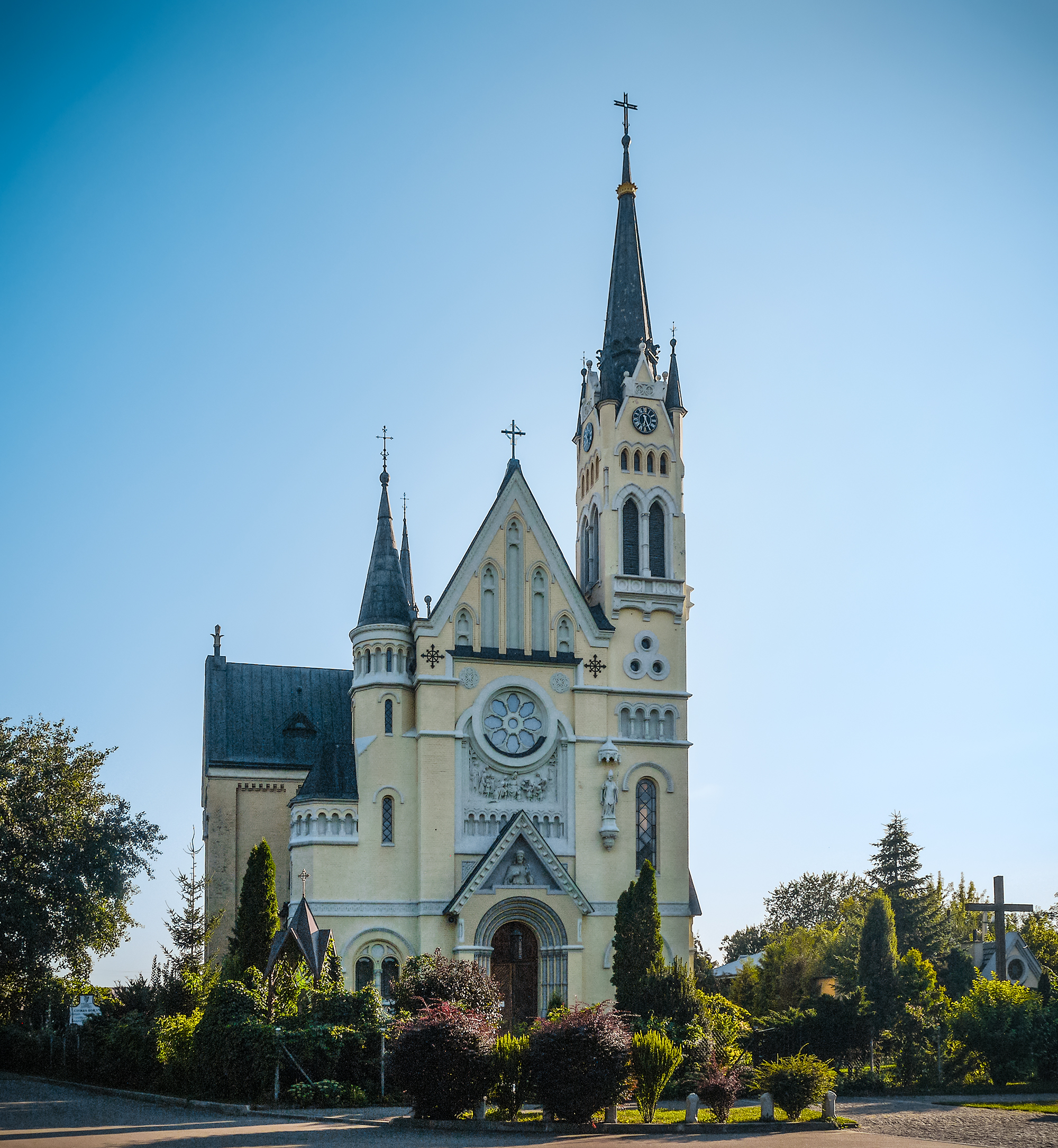
- Exaltation of the Holy Cross Church

- Flag Coat of arms
- Interactive map of Fastiv
- Location within Kyiv Oblast Location within Ukraine
- Coordinates: 50°05′N 29°55′E
- Country: Ukraine
- Oblast: Kyiv Oblast
- Raion: Fastiv Raion
- Hromada: Fastiv urban hromada
- Founded: 1390

Government
  - Mayor: Mykhailo Netyazhuk (Party of National Selfishness)

Area
  - Total: 43 km^{2} (17 sq mi)
- Elevation: 199 m (653 ft)

Population (2022)
  - Total: 44,014
  - Density: 1,000/km^{2} (2,700/sq mi)
- Time zone: UTC+2 (EET)
  - Summer (DST): UTC+3 (EEST)
- Postal code: 08500 — 08509
- Area code: +380 4565
- Website: fastiv-rada.gov.ua

Fastiv (Ukrainian: Фастів, IPA: [ˈfɑs⁽ʲ⁾t⁽ʲ⁾iu̯]) is a city in the Kyiv Oblast (province) in central Ukraine. On older maps it is depicted as Khvastiv (Polish: Chwastów; Ukrainian: Хвастів). Administratively, it serves as the administrative centre of the Fastiv Raion (district), to which it does not administratively belong. Fastiv hosts the administration of Fastiv urban hromada, one of the hromadas of Ukraine. Its population is approximately 44,014 (2022 estimate).

Lying on conjunction of railway lines, Fastiv is an important node station on the rail route from central Europe to Russia and Asia. On 1 December 1918 at the Fastiv train station delegations of the Ukrainian People's Republic and the West Ukrainian People's Republic signed the Unification Act uniting territories of Ukraine that were split between Austrian and Russian empires.

Beside transportation industry, Brewing and machinery industry are also present, although the majority of inhabitants are employed by Ukrzaliznytsia's 12 railway installations in the city.

== History ==
The foundation date of the city is not known. Under its current name the populated place is first mentioned as early as 1390 in old Rus' chronicles where it is stated that Prince of Kyiv Vladimir Olgerdovich issued a certificate that stated that Fastiv belonged to Rozhanovsky princes.

Fastiv is a historical city that survived through many times Cossack uprisings and the Great Turkish War with the period of total devastation and later resettlement. In 1685 it became one of centers of revived Cossack movement in the Polish-Lithuanian Commonwealth following the Treaty of Andrusovo. In early 18th century around Fastiv took place Paliy uprising. Following the unsuccessful military campaign of Pylyp Orlyk in 1711, remnants of his military force withdrew to Fastiv after the 1711 siege of Bila Tserkva.

In the second half of 18th century, Fastiv was one of centers of another local uprising known as Koliyivshchyna.

In 1793 the town was ceded to the Russian Empire as part of the Second Partition of Poland and the complete Russian occupation of the Right-bank Ukraine.

In 1825 during the Decembrist revolt in Saint Petersburg, the Imperial Russian troops quartered around Fastiv and Vasylkiv supported the revolt. In the mid 19th century around Fastiv, the Imperial Russian archaeological commission conducted archaeological excavations of the "Perepiat kurgan" which were attended by Taras Shevchenko as an experienced artist.

The loss in Crimean War, led to intensive development of railroad network throughout the Russian Empire and in 1870 through Fastiv was installed the Kyiv–Odesa railroad.

As Chwastów (Fastów), it is mentioned in the 19th century Geographical Dictionary of the Kingdom of Poland being a town of the Vasylkiv county.

In 1898 Fastiv became a permanent residence of Imperial Russian inventor Nikolay Benardos out of the Central Ukraine who is known for developing of arc welding in the Russian Empire.

In 1 December 1918 a preliminary treaty of alliance between the Ukrainian People's Republic and West Ukrainian People's Republic was signed in Fastiv, paving way for the Unification Act of both states on 22 January 1919.

In September 1919, a pogrom of the Jewish population of Fastiv was carried out by Denikin's White Army forces (Fastov massacre). About 1,800 people were murdered and about 8,000 died in the following year from wounds or epidemics. In 1941 the Nazi Einsatzgruppe C under Paul Blobel murdered all Fastiv Jews between the ages of 12 and 60.

Until 18 July 2020, Fastiv was incorporated as a city of oblast significance. It also served as the administrative center of Fastiv Raion even though it did not belong to the raion. In July 2020, as part of the administrative reform of Ukraine, which reduced the number of raions of Kyiv Oblast to seven, the city of Fastiv was merged into Fastiv Raion.

It was reported on 11 March 2022 that there were fights near Fastiv as Russian troops were trying to move towards the town.

== Demographics ==
As of the most recent Ukrainian census, Fastiv had a population of 51,552 inhabitants. In terms of ethnic groups living in the city, Ukrainians make up an overwhelming majority, followed by a notable Russian community, as well as small Belarusian, Polish and Jewish minorities. The exact ethnic composition was as follows:

Ethnic groups in Fastiv
	percent
Ukrainians	90.73%
Russians	7.77%
Belarusians	0.44%
Poles	0.18%
Jews	0.10%
others	0.78%

In terms of spoken languages, Fastiv is Ukrainophone. At the time of the census, almost 91% of the population were native Ukrainian speakers, while almost 9% primarily spoke Russian. The exact linguistic composition of the city was as follows:

Languages in Fastiv
	percent
Ukrainian	90.8%
Russian	8.6%
Belarusian	0.2%
others	0.1%

== Economy ==
The main branches of the economy of the city of Fastiv are: industry, railway and trade.

=== Industry ===
Fastiv has a long industrial tradition, and currently the city's enterprises produce the following products: chemical, electrothermal, oil refining and gas consumption equipment, furniture, technical oils, sewing products, beer and soft drinks, flour, printing products, food packaging, bread and bakery products.

The most powerful industrial enterprises are:

– "Univest Marketing" LLC is one of the leaders in the publishing and printing industries of Ukraine, the company is engaged in the production of newspapers, magazines, trade catalogs, cardboard and blister packaging;

- PrJSC "Elopak" - production of Pure-Pak blanks for packaging liquid food products;

– LLC "Pyvovarnia Ziberta " - production of beer and soft drinks;

– LLC "Kyivhlib" - production of bakery and confectionery products;

– "Kreisel-Building Materials" LLC - production of dry building mixes;

– "Eko Vtor" LLC - processing of PET raw materials into polyester fiber;

– "Poligrin Company" LLC - processing of secondary polyethylene into granules.

- "Fakel" plant is one of the leading machine-building enterprises that manufactures odorization units, oil coolers, gas heaters, containers, burners and tanks.

– "Arian Technical Oil Factory" LLC - production of hydraulic oil and fluid, cooling oil;

In the Industrial Zone of the city of Fastiv, Kyiv Region, the industrial park "FastIndustry" was created, with a total area of 15 hectares, which was entered into the Register of Industrial Parks of Ukraine (No. 17). The managing company of the industrial park is START-INDUSTRY Company LLC.

=== Transport and logistics ===
Fastiv is a major transport hub. Both road and railway routes pass through it.

First of all, the city of Fastiv has a convenient railway connection and is a major hub station. The distance to the city of Kyiv is 75 km by road and 57 km by railway.

A mainline electrified railway passes through the city. From here, suburban, passenger and freight trains run in 4 directions: Kyiv, Kozyatyn I, Myronivka, Zhytomyr.

There are 9 railway companies operating on the territory of the city of Fastiv. Some of the largest enterprises of this industry in Ukraine operate on the basis of a powerful railway hub:

Refrigerator Railway Car Subsidiary Company Ukrainian Railways JSC. The branch provides international transport and forwarding services for the delivery of goods, cold logistics, repair of wagons, major repair of cranes of rebuilding trains, train cars.

Motorovagonne depot Fastiv-1 carries out overhaul of electric trains, in which electric trains of the South-Western Railway are maintained and serviced. A fairly large number of freight trains are formed and dispatched daily. Large volumes of transit transportation.

Fastiv-1 railway station, which is one of the most important stations of Southwestern Railways. The enterprise performs unloading, loading and dispatching of wagons. The Fastiv station accepts long-distance and suburban passengers.

Fastiv-2 railway station operates for cargo.

The advantage of the city of Fastiv is the proximity of transcontinental routes, namely its location between 2 European highways:

- Corridor No. 3 (route E40)
- Corridor No. 9 (route E95)
- State highways R-19 and R-04 pass through the city.

Fastiv has a bus system that connects many streets, villages and towns with the city center and the capital.

==== Logistics (Customs posts) ====
The FLK-Invest LLC logistics complex operates in the industrial zone of the city of Fastiv, which offers a full range of services as a logistics service provider, responsible storage and handling of goods to customers at a class "A" warehouse complex in the city of Fastiv, Kyiv region.

The customs clearance sector (FASTIV) of the "Southern" Сustoms Post of the Kyiv Customs operates on the territory of the Logistics Complex.

=== Economic potential (Fastiv Strategic Initiative) ===
On April 18, 2019, the constituent assembly was formed and held the FastIV Industrial and Logistics Cluster. Representatives of 21 enterprises subscribed to the Cluster.

The FastIV Industrial and Logistics Cluster is organic neighbouring of 4 important components: industry, logistics, innovative educational space and business development centre:

«FastIndustry» Industrial Park:

The equipped area (15 hectares) for new facilities in the field of industrial production, logistics, and related services.

«FastLogistic» Logistics Hub:

Klaipeda-Fastiv-Odesa railroad and sea freight line extending to the ports of Asia and Africa. Transportation is expected to include mainly containers shipments (universal and refrigerator containers).

«FastDevelopment»

Local Development Centre:

The centre to be formed in order to encourage development of entrepreneurship in the City, providing of services aimed at business improvement and ensuring of better access to finance.

«FastKnowledge»

Innovation Educational Environment:

The education environment expected to contribute to better opportunities of students, entrepreneurs and individuals in prompt of the modern knowledge required for the development of the City`s entrepreneurship and economy.

=== Trade ===
On the territory of the city, more than 100 enterprises are engaged in trading activities.

Among them: national food retailers, such as "Silpo-Food" LLC, "Fora" LLC, "ATB-market" LLC, "Trash" LLC, regional and local chains. There are also non-food supermarkets such as "Eldorado", "Foxtrot", "Comfi", "Budmarket" and others on the territory of the city.

There are 5 markets in the city.

=== Banking ===
The following banking institutions operate in the community: JSC "Oschadbank", JSC CB "Privatbank", JSC "Raiffeisen Bank", JSC "UKRGAZBANK".

=== Insurance ===
1. Fastiv district branch "NASK Oranta";

2. Sales and customer service center of Providna SC;

3. TAS Insurance Group.

Print media:

- Advertising and information magazine "Nash Horodok";

- PP "Editorial of the Fastiv newspaper "Peremohga"".

=== Foreign economic activity and international relations ===
The main direction of the investment policy of the community is the creation of favorable conditions for the development of entrepreneurship, improvement of the investment climate and its popularization among potential investors, establishment of a marketing and promotion system, attraction of foreign investors, assistance in the implementation of economically significant investment projects involving all sources of financial resources.

The founders of enterprises in the city of Fastov are companies from China, Germany, Norway and Cyprus.

Community enterprises carry out foreign trade operations with the following countries: Austria, Azerbaijan, Bulgaria, British Virgin Islands, Vietnam, Georgia, Estonia, Israel, Kazakhstan, China, Latvia, Lithuania, Luxembourg, Moldova, Germany, New Zealand, Poland, Singapore, USA, Turkmenistan, Hungary, Switzerland, Sweden.

Twin cities:

- Wałcz County (Poland)
- Tomaszów Lubelski (Poland)
- Odunpazarı / Eskişehir (Republic of Turkey)

Cooperation with international organizations

The city of Fastiv is a member of:

- European initiative - Covenant of Mayors;
- Initiatives of the European Commission "Mayor for Economic Growth";
- Alliance of Silk Road Cities.

Fastiv actively cooperates with international organizations, such as:

- NEFCO Corporation;
- Regional Environmental Center (REC);
- Office of the Council of Europe in Ukraine;
- Congress of local and regional authorities of the Council of Europe;
- United Nations Development Program;
- Foundation of Eastern Europe;
- UNICEF.

Fastiv has the status of a "12-star" city from the Congress of Local and Regional Authorities of the Council of Europe for the city's active participation in the development of local democracy.

== Education ==
There are 11 pre-school education institutions in the city, which fully ensures the needs of the population. They serve 1,628 pupils.

The network of general secondary education institutions includes 4 institutions of general secondary education, 5 educational complexes and 2 lyceums. There is also a private institution of general secondary education.

6,116 students are taught in the city schools.

Our secondary education institutions allow children and young people to develop their abilities in the sphere of education, science, culture, physical culture and sport, technical and other creative skills. They are able to acquire initial professional knowledge and skills necessary for their socialization, further self-realization and professional activity.

In 2016, the "Fastiv Educational and Rehabilitation Center" was created, which realizes the right to education of children with special needs, by supporting their development and integration into society.

In 2019 the municipal establishment of the Fastiv City Council "Exclusive-Resource Center" was established, which provides support to children with special educational needs through carrying out complex psychological-pedagogical evaluation of child development, providing psychological-pedagogical and correction-development services, and providing systematic qualified support.

== Architecture ==
Historical landmarks include the Intercession Church (Ukrainian: Pokrovska Tserkva; Intercession of the Theotokos Church) - a 17th-century Orthodox church, also known as Paliy Church (after the Cossack leader Semen Paliy). There is also an early 20th-century Catholic church.

== Gallery ==
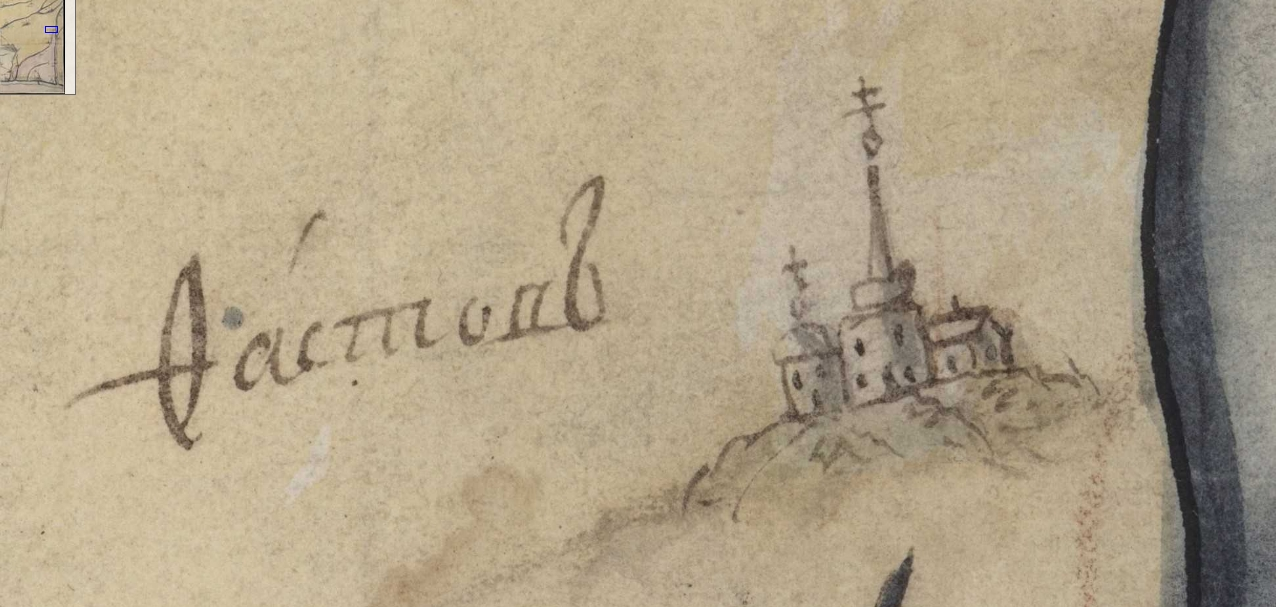
One of names on maps (18th century)

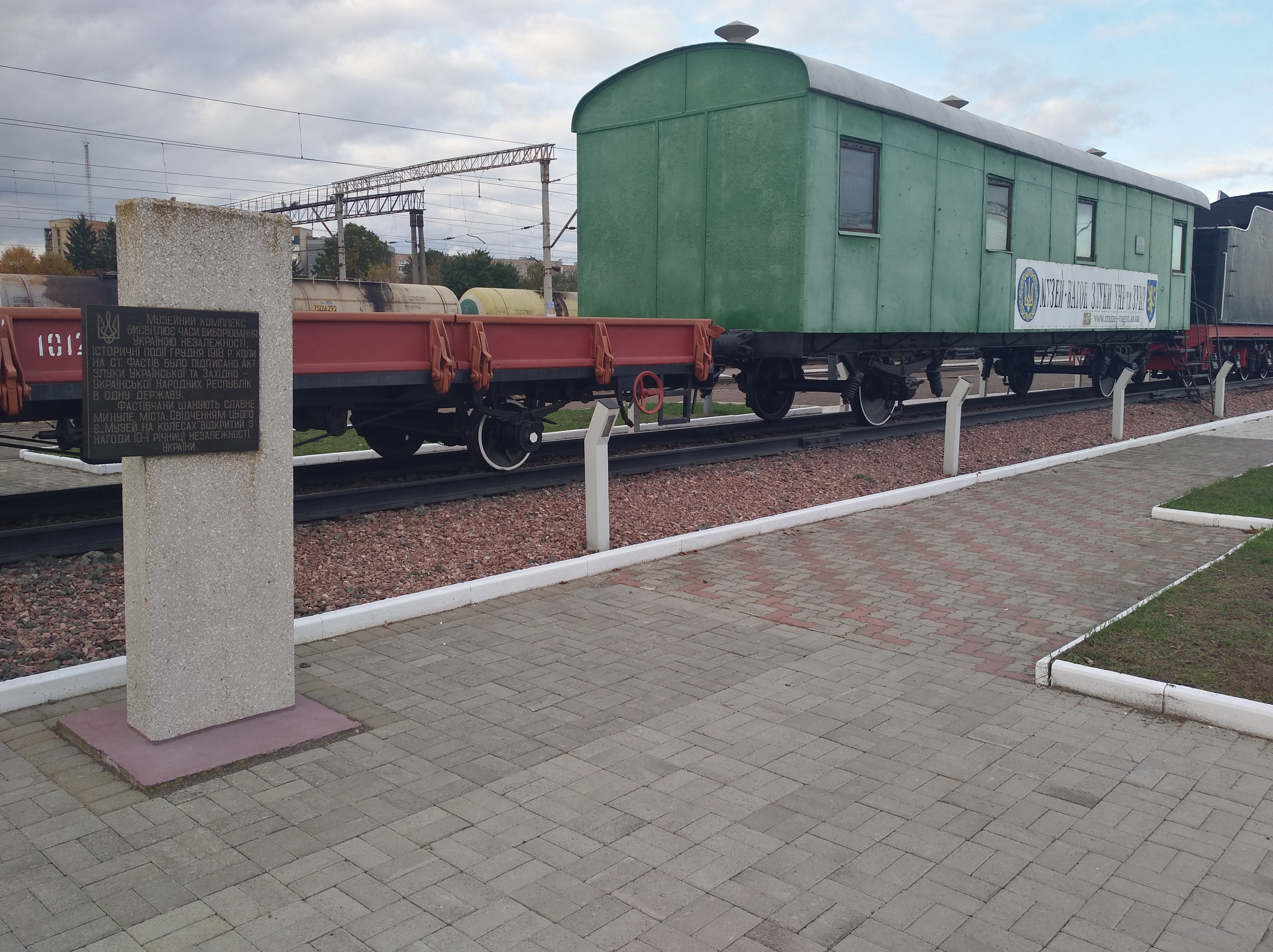
Railway wagon ("Museum on the wheels"), in which the unification treaty of both Ukrainian republics was signed in 1918

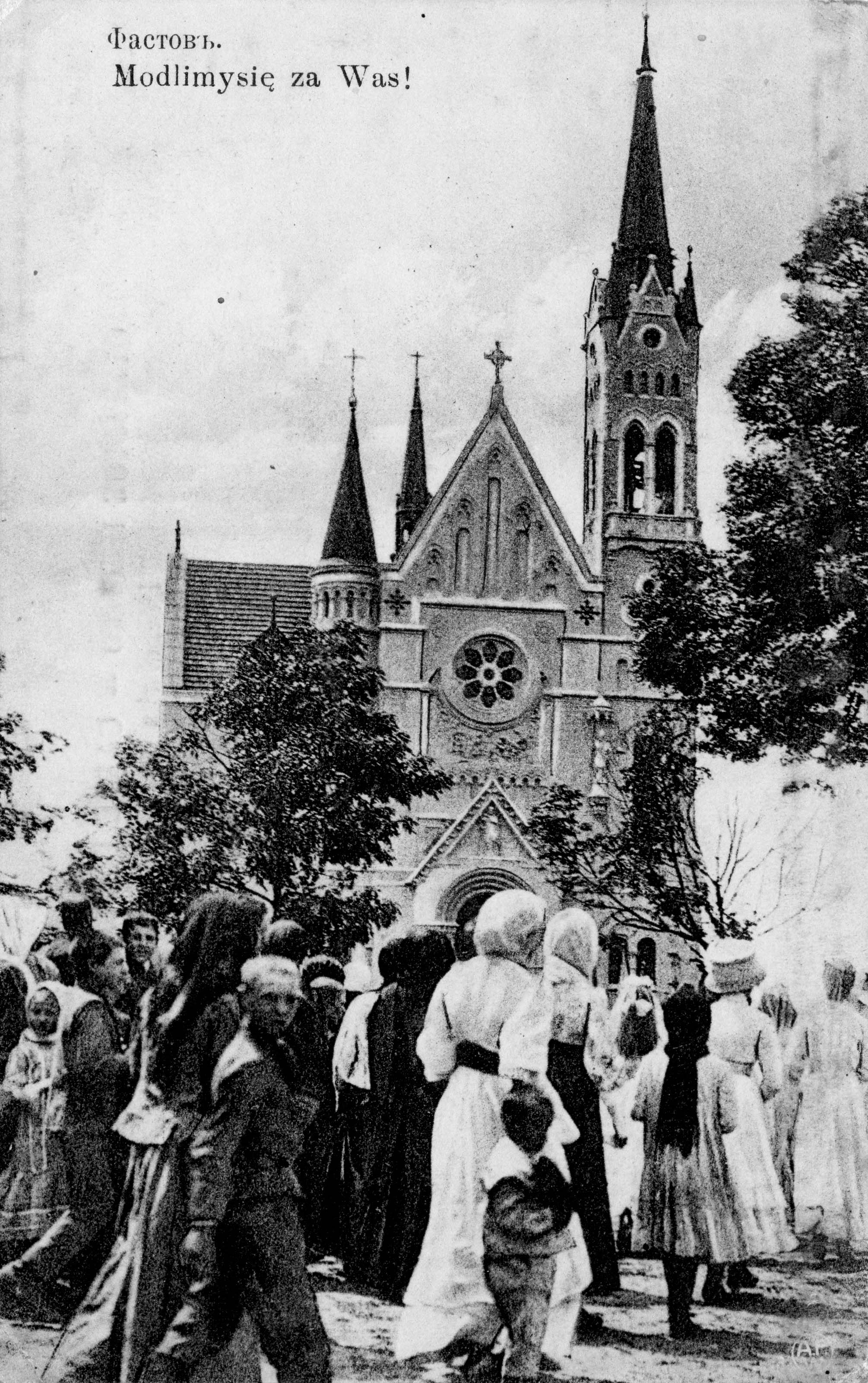
Fastiv's catholic church and its parish (early 20th-century postcard).

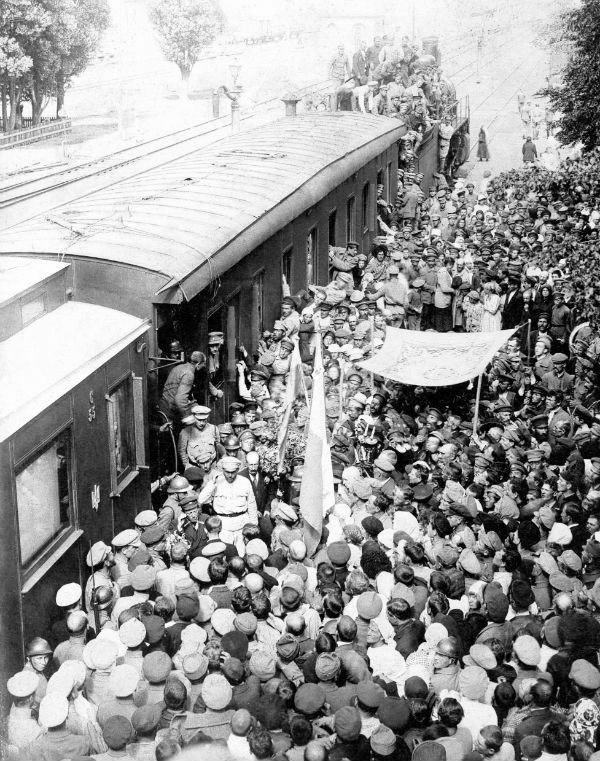
Meeting of Symon Petlura at the Fastiv train station on 29 August 1919

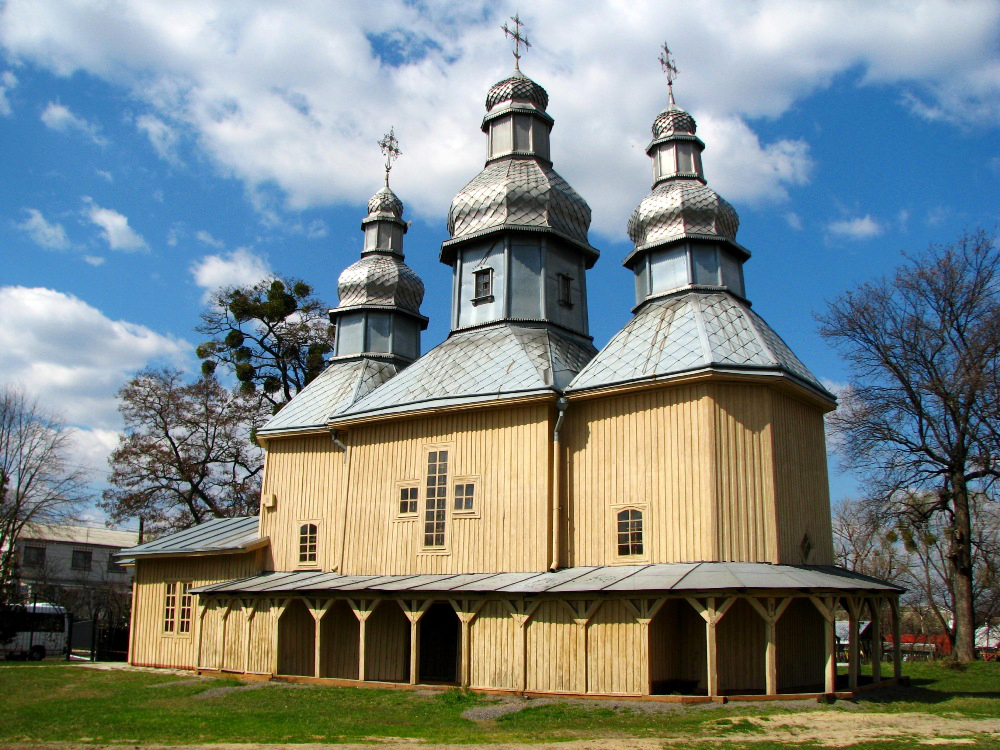
Historic wooden church

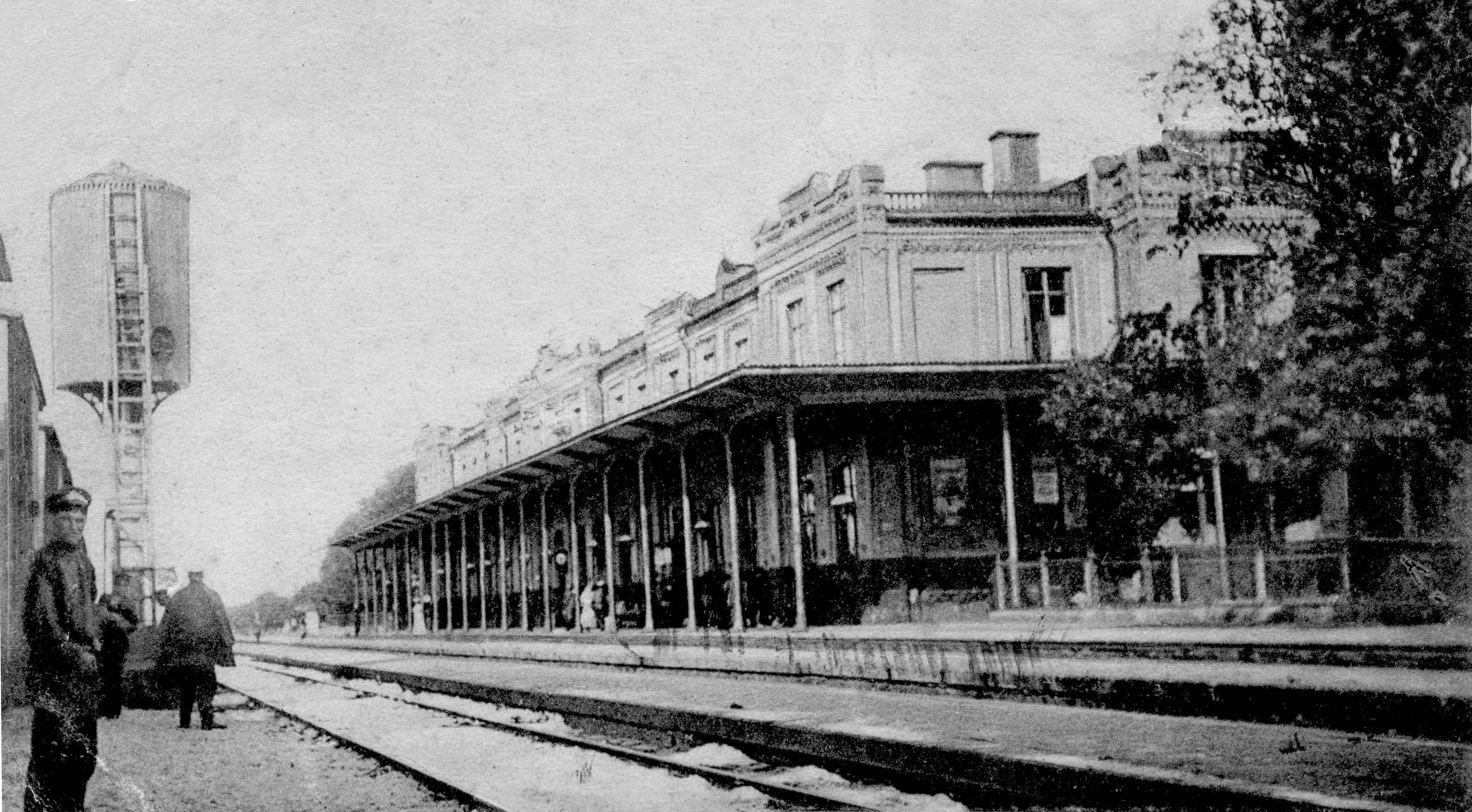
Fastiv's railway station (early 20th-century postcard).

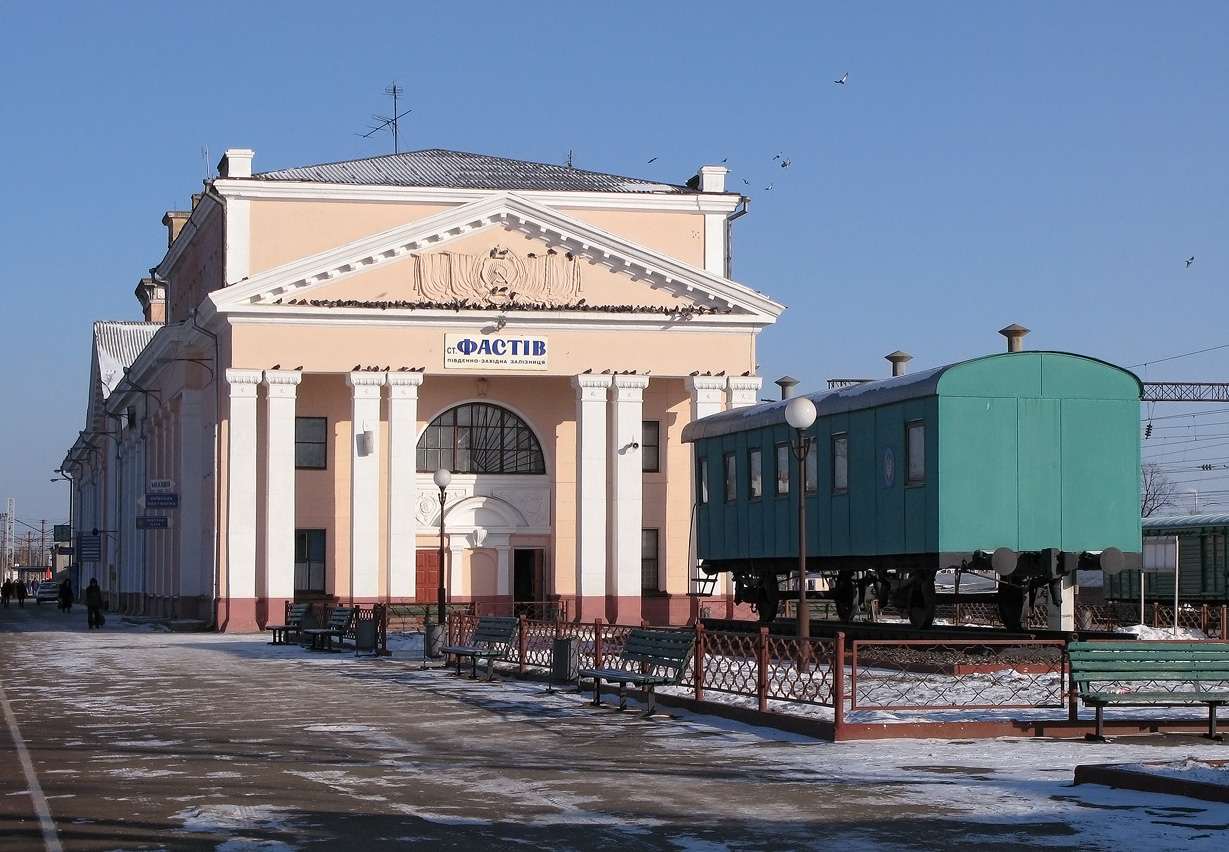
Modern Fastiv-1 railway station: passenger terminal (now demolished) and the "Museum on wheels".

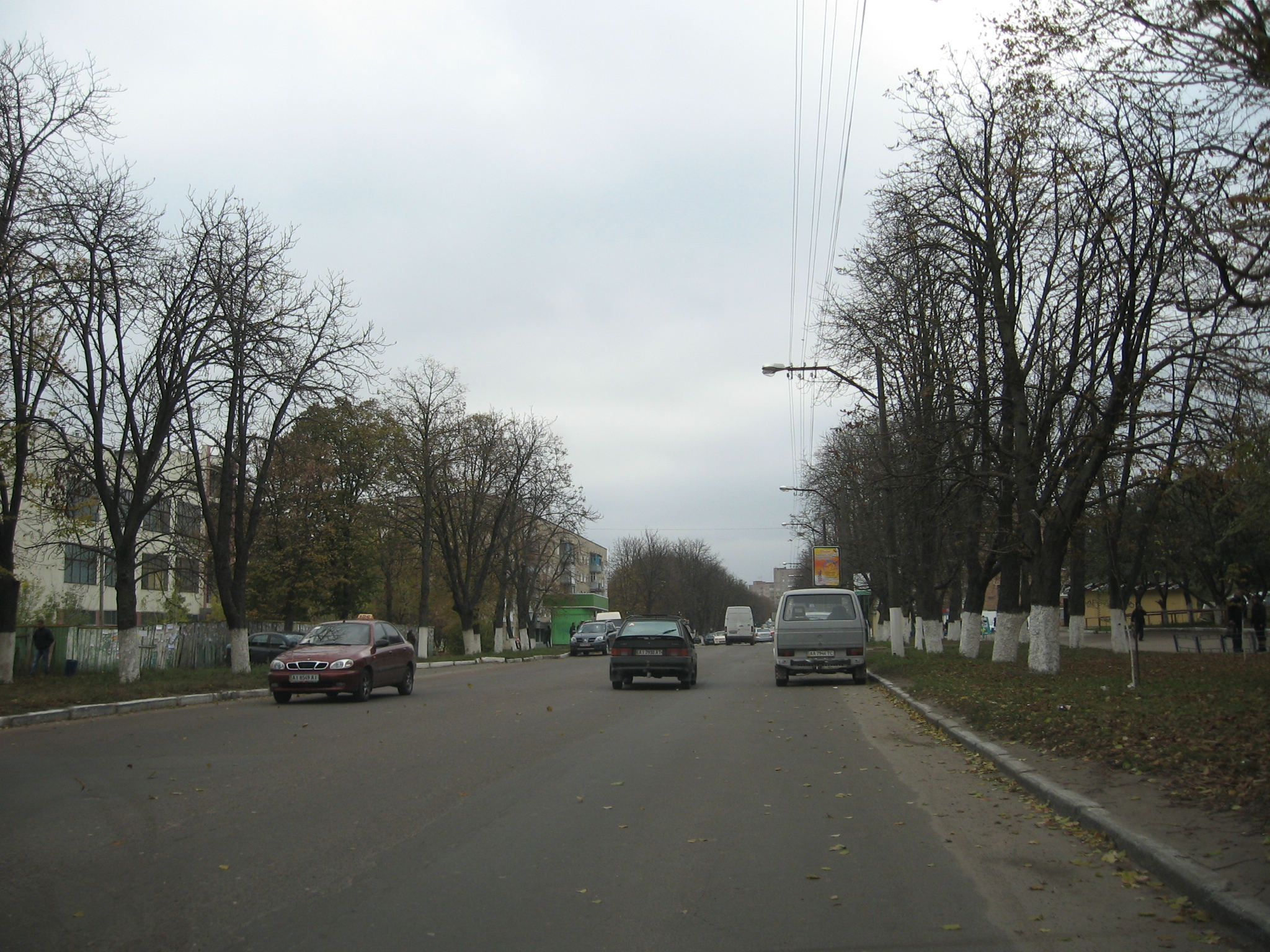
A street in the city centre

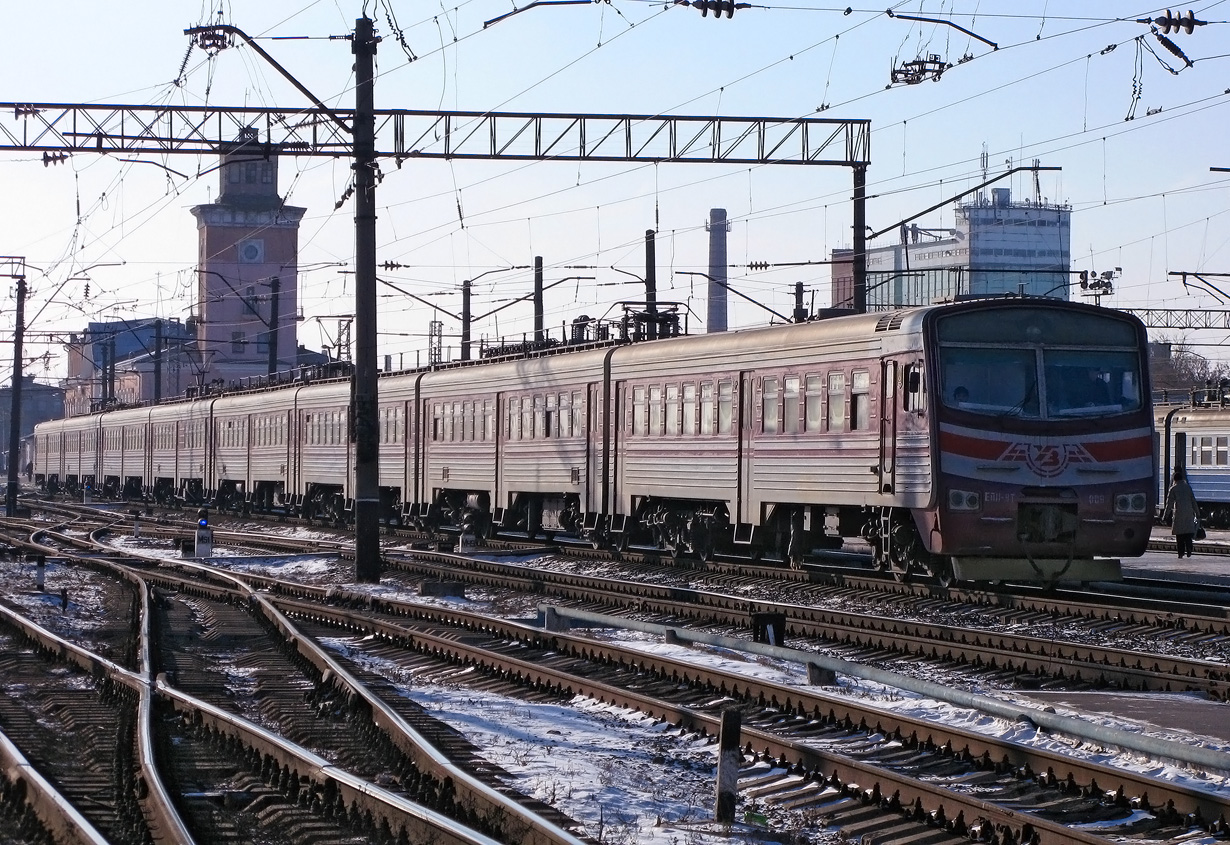
A suburban train and the railway skyline

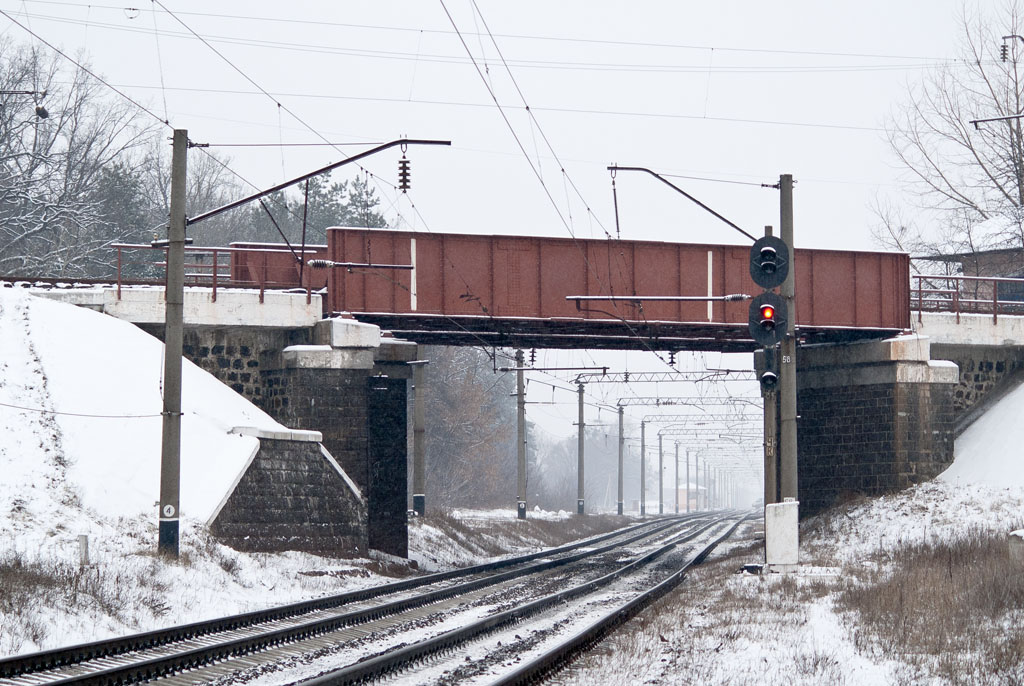
One of Fastiv's many railway intersections

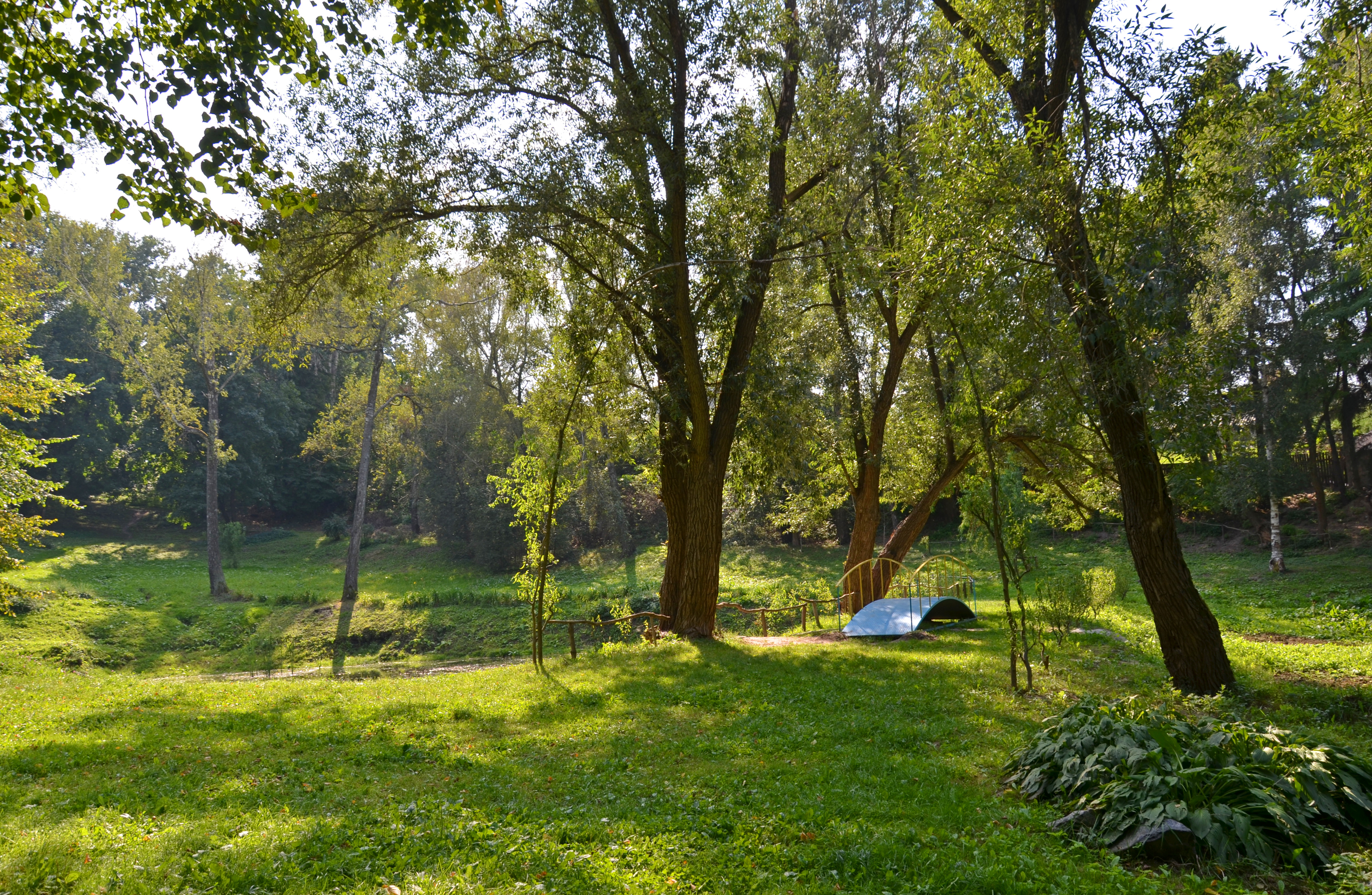
Youth Park in Fastiv

== Town twinning ==
Wałcz County, Poland

== Notable people ==
- Ephraim Sklyansky (1892 - 1925), Soviet statesman and trotskyist.
- Jan Koum, CEO and co-founder of WhatsApp (with Brian Acton), a mobile messaging application which was acquired by Facebook Inc. in February 2014 for US$19 Billion.

== See also ==
- Elektrichka
- Transportation in Ukraine
- Nikolay Benardos
