= Pyatnitsky (surname) =

Pyatnitsky (Russian: Пятницкий; masculine) or Pyatnitskaya (Пятницкая; feminine) is a Russian surname. It is shared by the following people:

- Andrey Pyatnitsky (b. 1967), Russian association football player
- Konstantin Pyatnitsky (1864–1938), Russian journalist, publisher, and memoirist
- Mitrofan Pyatnitsky (1864–1927), Russian musician, founder of the Pyatnitsky Choir
- Osip Piatnitsky (Pyatnitsky) (1882–1938), Soviet politician
- Valery Pyatnitsky (b. 1962), Ukrainian politician

== Fictional characters ==
- Maxim Arturovitch Pyatnitski, the protagonist of the Pyat Quartet tetralogy by Michael Moorcock

== See also ==
- Pyatnytsky, Ukrainian form of the last name
