= Vepryk =

Vepryk (Ukrainian: Веприк) may refer to the following places in Ukraine:

- Vepryk, Kyiv Oblast, village in Fastiv Raion, Kyiv Oblast
- Vepryk, Poltava Oblast, village in Myrhorod Raion, Poltava Oblast
