= Volchy-Pervy =

Volchy-Pervy Волчий-Первый
- Khutor
- Location within Belgorod Oblast Location within Russia
- Coordinates: 50°26′N 37°32′E
- Country: Russia
- Region: Belgorod Oblast
- District: Volokonovsky District
- Time zone: UTC+3:00

Volchy-Pervy (Russian: Волчий-Первый) is a rural locality (a khutor) in Volokonovsky District, Belgorod Oblast, Russia. The population was 82 as of 2010. There are 2 streets.

== Geography ==
Volchy-Pervy is located 32 km west of Volokonovka (the district's administrative centre) by road. Bochanka is the nearest rural locality.
