= Korovino, Volokonovsky District, Belgorod Oblast =

Korovino Коровино
- Selo
- Location within Belgorod Oblast Location within Russia
- Coordinates: 50°35′N 37°46′E
- Country: Russia
- Region: Belgorod Oblast
- District: Volokonovsky District
- Time zone: UTC+3:00

Korovino (Russian: Коровино) is a rural locality (a selo) in Volokonovsky District, Belgorod Oblast, Russia. The population was 257 as of 2010. There are 3 streets.

== Geography ==
Korovino is located 15 kilometres (9.3 mi) north of Volokonovka (the district's administrative centre) by road. Novoivanovka is the nearest rural locality.
