= Pyatnitsky (inhabited locality) =

Pyatnitsky (Russian: Пятницкий; masculine), Pyatnitskaya (Пятницкая; feminine), or Pyatnitskoye (Пятницкое; neuter) is the name of several inhabited localities in Russia.

== Modern localities ==
Urban localities

- Pyatnitskoye, Belgorod Oblast (also known as Pyatnitskaya), a work settlement in Volokonovsky District of Belgorod Oblast; 50°26′N 37°50′E

Rural localities

- Pyatnitsky, Orlovsky District, Oryol Oblast, a settlement in Maslovsky Selsoviet of Orlovsky District in Oryol Oblast; 53°07′N 35°48′E
- Pyatnitsky, Soskovsky District, Oryol Oblast, a settlement in Lobyntsevsky Selsoviet of Soskovsky District in Oryol Oblast; 52°50′N 35°27′E
- Pyatnitskoye, Bryansk Oblast, a selo in Selilovichsky Rural Administrative Okrug of Rognedinsky District in Bryansk Oblast; 53°49′N 33°42′E
- Pyatnitskoye, Babyninsky District, Kaluga Oblast, a selo in Babyninsky District of Kaluga Oblast
- Pyatnitskoye, Spas-Demensky District, Kaluga Oblast, a selo in Spas-Demensky District of Kaluga Oblast
- Pyatnitskoye, Kursk Oblast, a selo in Znamensky Selsoviet of Gorshechensky District in Kursk Oblast
- Pyatnitskoye, Izmalkovsky District, Lipetsk Oblast, a selo in Pyatnitsky Selsoviet of Izmalkovsky District in Lipetsk Oblast; 52°28′N 38°04′E
- Pyatnitskoye, Krasninsky District, Lipetsk Oblast, a selo in Sotnikovsky Selsoviet of Krasninsky District in Lipetsk Oblast; 53°04′N 38°41′E
- Pyatnitskoye, Nizhny Novgorod Oblast, a village in Ogibnovsky Selsoviet under the administrative jurisdiction of the town of oblast significance of Semyonov in Nizhny Novgorod Oblast; 57°04′N 44°40′E
- Pyatnitskoye, Oryol Oblast, a selo in Bogoroditsky Selsoviet of Khotynetsky District in Oryol Oblast; 52°58′N 35°21′E
- Pyatnitskoye, Bashmakovsky District, Penza Oblast, a selo in Sheremetyevsky Selsoviet of Bashmakovsky District in Penza Oblast
- Pyatnitskoye, Pachelmsky District, Penza Oblast, a crossing loop in Sheynsky Selsoviet of Pachelmsky District in Penza Oblast
- Pyatnitskoye, Smolensk Oblast, a village in Oktyabrskoye Rural Settlement of Krasninsky District in Smolensk Oblast
- Pyatnitskoye, Kireyevsky District, Tula Oblast, a selo in Bolshekalmyksky Rural Okrug of Kireyevsky District in Tula Oblast
- Pyatnitskoye, Varfolomeyevsky Rural Okrug, Leninsky District, Tula Oblast, a selo in Varfolomeyevsky Rural Okrug of Leninsky District in Tula Oblast
- Pyatnitskoye, Zaytsevsky Rural Okrug, Leninsky District, Tula Oblast, a village in Zaytsevsky Rural Okrug of Leninsky District in Tula Oblast
- Pyatnitskoye, Maksatikhinsky District, Tver Oblast, a village in Malyshevskoye Rural Settlement of Maksatikhinsky District in Tver Oblast
- Pyatnitskoye, Rzhevsky District, Tver Oblast, a village in Medvedevo Rural Settlement of Rzhevsky District in Tver Oblast
- Pyatnitskoye, Toropetsky District, Tver Oblast, a village in Skvortsovskoye Rural Settlement of Toropetsky District in Tver Oblast
- Pyatnitskoye, Vesyegonsky District, Tver Oblast, a village in Kesemskoye Rural Settlement of Vesyegonsky District in Tver Oblast

== Alternative names ==
- Pyatnitskoye, alternative name of Pyatnitsa, a village in Sokolovskoye Rural Settlement of Solnechnogorsky District in Moscow Oblast; 56°05′N 36°48′E
