= Fastiv I railway station =

Railway station in Fastiv, Ukraine

Fastiv I Фастів I
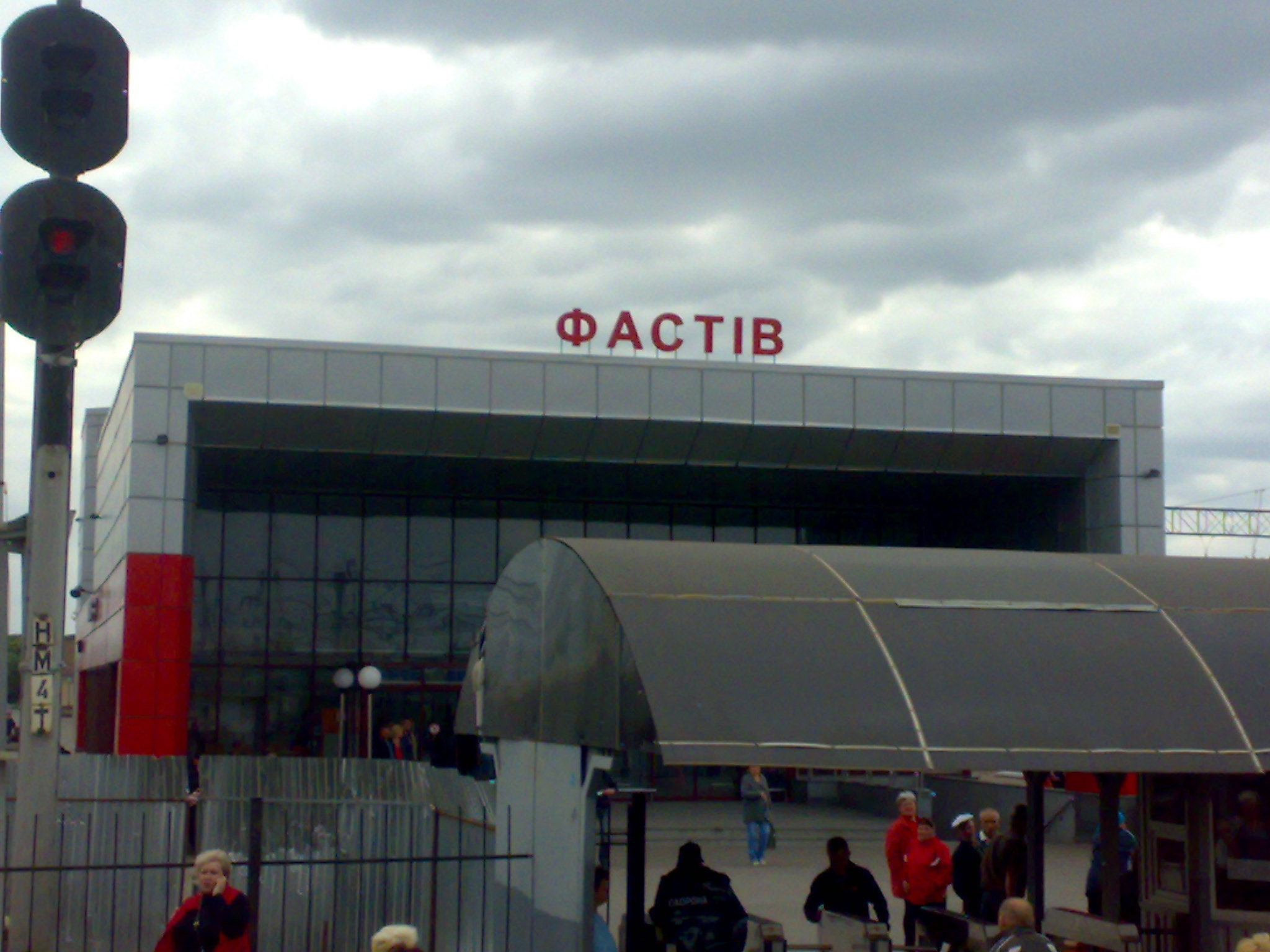
- The station building in 2012

General information
- Coordinates: 50°4′42.84″N 29°55′51.84″E
- Owner: Southwestern Railways

History
- Opened: 1870
- Electrified: 1958

Services
Preceding station	Southwestern Railways	Following station
Terminus	Fastiv–Kyiv line	Snitynka towards Kyiv
Location

Fastiv I is the main railway station in Fastiv, Ukraine. It is a key railway hub of Ukraine.

== History ==
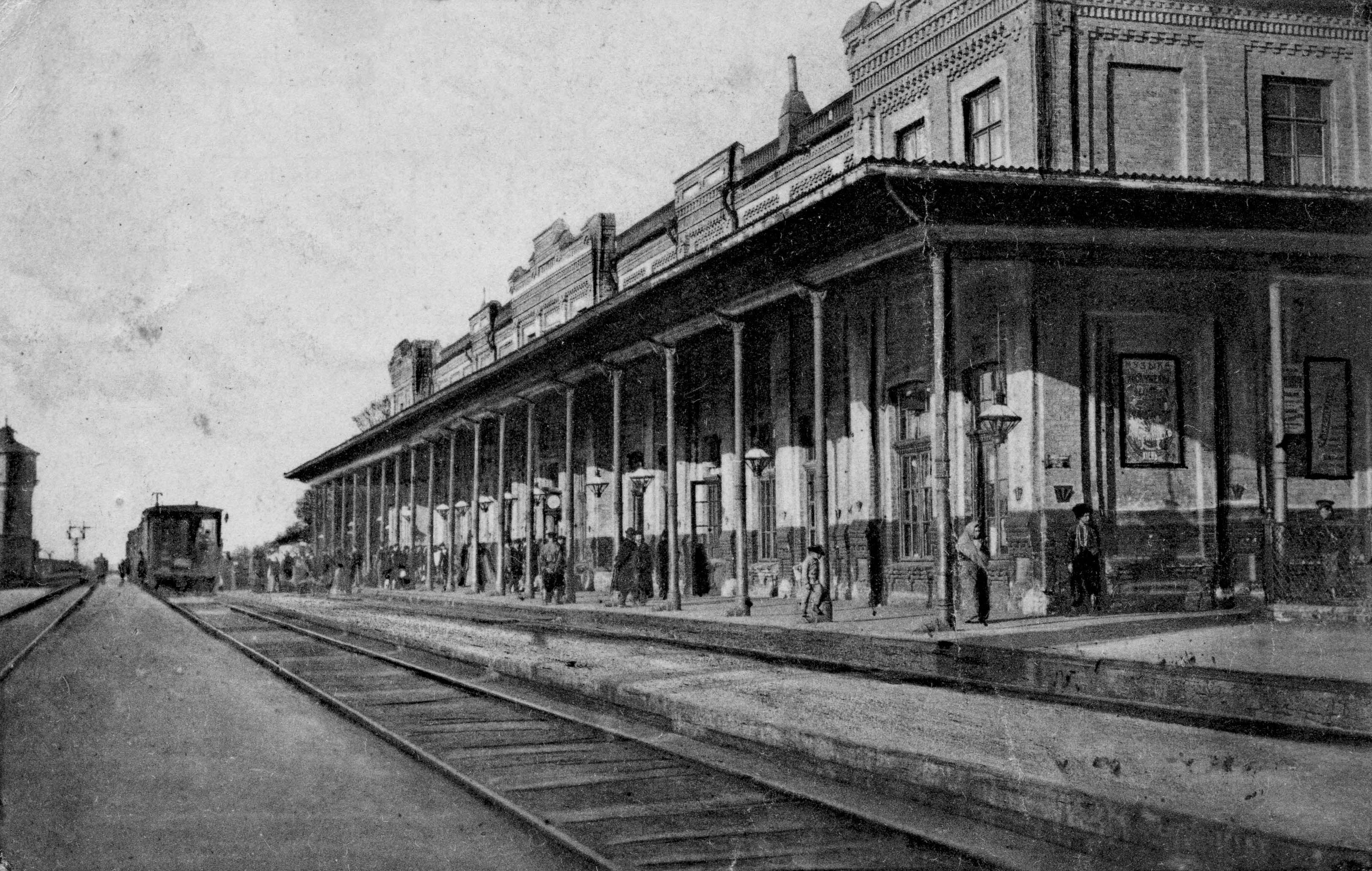
The original Fastiv I railway station before 1917

In the early 1870s, the Minister of Transport in Imperial Russia Vladimir Bobrinsky began the construction of Fastiv I Railway to connect from Fastiv to Bobrinsky station (now Taras Shevchenko Station in Smila), where the Fastiv Railway Administration as well as Bobrinsky's sugar factories were located at the time. The station was designed by architect Valerian Kulikovsky and opened in 1870.

After the construction of the Fastiv – Zhytomyr railway line in 1935, Fastiv I became one of the largest railway hub of the Southwestern Railways.

The station building experienced substantial damage during World War II. After the war, the design of the new station took a long time and construction only began in 1949. The new station finished in 1952.

In August 2011, the Fastiv – Zhytomyr section was electrified. On August 23, 2011, coinciding with the 20th anniversary of Ukraine's independence, a new station building was opened. The new building was constructed in six months. A park was built on top of the former site of the old station building.

The station building was hit and destroyed by Russian drones on the night of December 5–6, 2025 during the Russian aerial campaign against Ukrainian infrastructure of the Russo-Ukrainian war. In the afternoon of 6 December 2025 Ukrzaliznytsia (Ukraine's state-owned railway company) reported that it had restored train services through the railway station. On 8 December 2025 it was announced that the station will be replaced by a new building; while a temporary structure will be installed on the platform during the building of the new station.

== Services ==
As a key hub, most long distance trains stop at Fastiv I. The only exceptions are high speed and night express trains bound for Kyiv, Lviv, Ivano-Frankivsk, Uzhhorod and other cities.

From September 23, 2016 to April 26, 2022, the "Danube" night express train on the Kyiv – Izmail route stops at Fastiv I. This stop was suspended after an airstrike damaging the Zatoka Bridge.
