= Fastiv urban hromada =

Fastiv urban hromada Фастівська міська громада
- Hromada
- Interactive map of Fastiv urban hromada
- Country: Ukraine
- Oblast: Kyiv Oblast
- Raion: Fastiv Raion

Area
  - Total: 336.2 km^{2} (129.8 sq mi)

Population (2020)
  - Total: 62,720
  - Density: 186.6/km^{2} (483.2/sq mi)
- Settlements: 18
- Cities: 1
- Villages: 16
- Towns: 1

Fastiv urban hromada (Ukrainian: Фастівська міська громада) is a hromada of Ukraine, located in Fastiv Raion, Kyiv Oblast. Its administrative center is the city Fastiv.

It has an area of 336.2 square kilometres (129.8 mi^{2}) and a population of 62,720, as of 2020.

The hromada contains 18 settlements: 1 city (Fastiv), 1 rural settlement (Borova), and 16 villages:

- Bortnyky
- Velyka Motovylivka
- Velyka Ofirna
- Velyka Snitynka
- Vepryk
- Vyshniaky
- Hvardiiske
- Klekhivka
- Mala Ofirna
- Mala Snitynka
- Mlynok
- Motovylivka
- Motovylivska Slobidka
- Olenivka
- Tarasenky
- Fastivets

== See also ==
- List of hromadas of Ukraine
