= Battle of Motovilivka =

Battle in the Ukrainian Civil War

Battle of Motovylivka
- Part of Ukrainian Civil War and Anti-Hetman Uprising
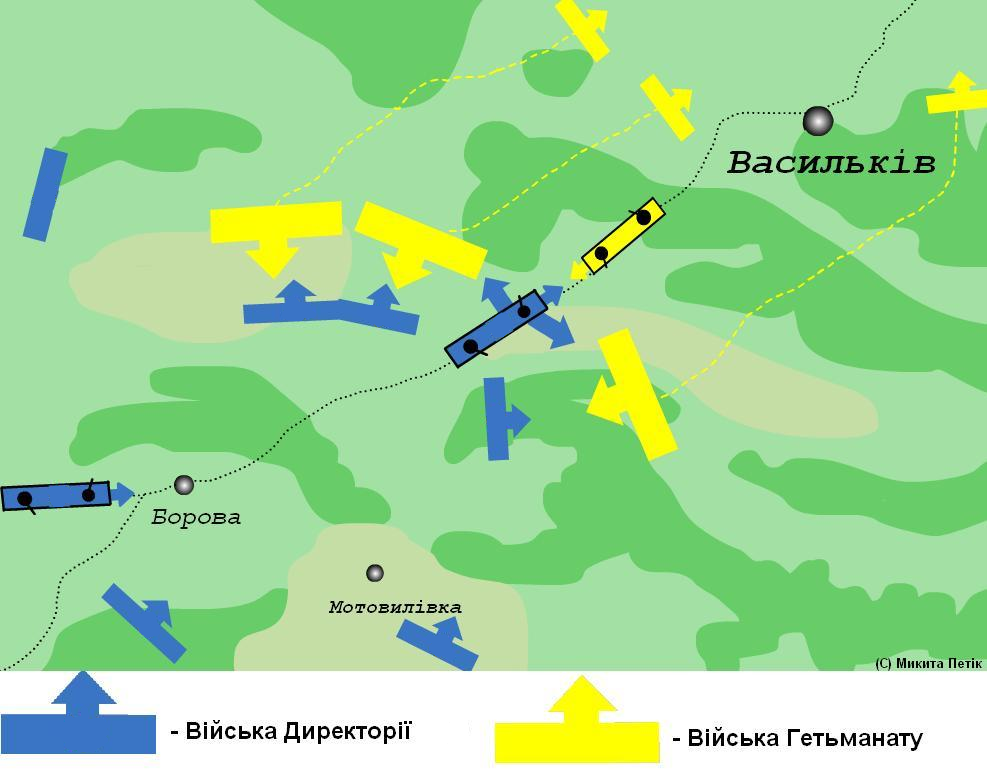
- Map of the battle, with the Directorate represented in blue and the Hetman represented in yellow.
Date	18 November 1918
Location	Motovilivka Station, Ukraine
Result	Decisive Directorate victory

Belligerents
Directorate of Ukraine	Ukrainian State

Commanders and leaders
Fyodor Chernik †; Nikolay Zagayevich †	(Ukrainian State) Alexander Svyatopolk-Mirsky (surrendered)

Strength
300, supported by 1,000 reinforcements	1,500

Casualties and losses
17 killed 22 wounded	600

The Battle of Motovylivka was a military engagement fought between forces of the Ukrainian State and the Directorate of Ukraine. The battle took place on 18 November 1918 during the Ukrainian Civil War, and resulted in a major victory for the Directorate. The battle resulted in the eventual collapse of the Ukrainian State in December 1918.

== Background ==
Following the Russian Revolution and the breakup of the Russian Empire, an extended period of social and political unrest erupted in the former Russian Ukrainian territory. With the First World War raging in Europe, the Central Power member nations of Germany and Austria Hungary sought to take advantage of the civil discord in the former Russian Empire by gaining control of the Ukrainian territory's reserves of wheat and vast tracks of arable farmland. A joint German-Austrian army invaded Ukraine in February 1918, defeated a disorganized force of Bolshevik soldiers and militia units, and forced the signing of the Treaty of Brest-Litovsk. Among other conditions, the treaty placed the Ukrainian territory in Germany's political and economic orbit. The acting government of Ukraine, the Ukrainian People's Republic, acquiesced to the German terms, though a number of small militant groups actively resisted the Germans. However, none of the various militant groups operating against the Germans were capable of effectively holding territory in the face of the overwhelmingly superior German army.

On 29 April 1918 a former General of the Imperial Russian Army, Pavlo Skoropadskyi, orchestrated a coup that succeeded in dissolving the Central Council of the republic and enthroning himself as the Hetman of the new Ukrainian State. The new government was supported by Germany, which desperately needed Ukraine's food supplies and sought to create a postwar buffer state between Germany and any nation-states that would arise in Russia. In addition to tying the new Ukrainian monarchy to the German Empire, Skoropadskyi also repealed a number of the Central Council's socialist policies, actions which in turn caused a number of pro-Bolshevik factions to revolt against the government. These factions gained momentum when the First World War came to an end on 11 November 1918, depriving the Ukrainian State of the majority of Germany's support. On 13 November a number of rebel factions formed the Directorate of Ukraine (also referred to as the Ukrainian National Union) to oppose the weakened Skoropadskyi government. The Directorate formed an army and moved against Kyiv.

The majority of the Directorate's forces were peasant militia from pro-Bolshevik or anti-Hetman Green armies. These militias were supplemented by the Sich Riflemen, a unit of professional Ukrainian soldiers that had formerly been disarmed and disbanded by the Skoropadskyi regime. The forces of the Ukrainian State were made up of former Russian troops, anti-Bolshevik militia, and a small contingent of German military advisors.

== Battle ==
On 15 November 1918 advance forces of the Directorate's army began to move towards Kyiv from the southwest. To counter this action, a force of 700 Hetman soldiers moved to intercept the Directorate forces near the town of Vasylkiv. The Hetman forces deployed themselves near a train station at Motovilivka. Intelligence of the Hetman deployment at Motovilivka made its way to forward elements of the Sich Riflemen under the command of Captain Fyodor Chernik. In response, Chernik launched an immediate attack against the Hetman forces, hoping to punch through their defenses and take Vasylkiv.

Chernik's detachment of 300 men attacked the left, right, and center of the Hetman force early on the morning of 18 November. The Hetman army counterattacked, pinning down the Directorate army's left flank. The Directorate forces held, but sustained several dozen casualties, including Chernik. On the Directorate's right flank, a force of 50 Sich Riflemen took cover in a wooded area from which they repelled several attacks by a large force of several hundred Hetman soldiers. In addition, both sides utilized armoured trains during the battle to provide fire support for their respective forces.

By midday the Hetman army's attack had begun to weaken, and Directorate reinforcements began to arrive on the field. Soon the Directorate left was able to outflank the Hetman right flank, sending the army into a retreat. The Hetman army counterattacked with their reserve forces and with an armoured train, but one of the Directorate's armoured trains landed an artillery shot on the Hetman train, forcing it to withdraw. The Hetman counterattack failed, and by 3:00 PM the Directorate forces held the field.

=== Casualties ===
The Directorate forces suffered 17 killed and several dozen wounded in the battle, while the Hetman forces lost over 600 troops.

== Aftermath and legacy ==
Following their victory at Motovilivka, the Directorate forces advanced on and captured Vasylkiv. The Hetman force retreated to Darnytsia. Over the next several weeks the Directorate forces moved closer to Kyiv, and on 14 December Skoropadskyi fled to Berlin. This flight marked the end of the Ukrainian State.

On 19 January 1919, the day of Epiphany, the funeral of Sich Riflemen fallen at Motovylivka took place in Kyiv. Organized by the Directorate, the ceremony was attended by representatives of the West Ukrainian People's Republic, who would sign the act of unification with the Ukrainian People's Republic three days later.
