= Borova, Kyiv Oblast =

Rural locality in Kyiv Oblast, Ukraine

Borova Борова
- Rural settlement
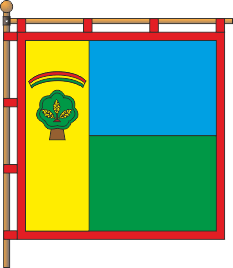
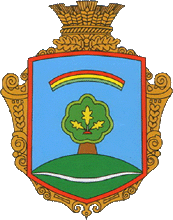
- Flag Coat of arms

- Location within Kyiv Oblast Location within Ukraine
- Coordinates: 50°10′24″N 30°06′14″E
- Country: Ukraine
- Oblast: Kyiv Oblast
- Raion: Fastiv Raion
- Founded: 1938

Area
  - Total: 7 km^{2} (2.7 sq mi)

Population (2022)
  - Total: 7,169
  - Density: 1,000/km^{2} (2,700/sq mi)
- Time zone: UTC+2 (EET)
  - Summer (DST): UTC+3 (EEST)
- Postal code: 2250 осіб/км² Поштовий індекс 08520
- Area code: +380 4565

Borova (Ukrainian: Борова) is a rural settlement in Fastiv Raion of Kyiv Oblast (province) of Ukraine, located on the Stuhna River. It belongs to Fastiv urban hromada, one of the hromadas of Ukraine. The Molovylivka railway station is located in the centre of the settlement. The population is 7,169 (2022 estimate)

Until 26 January 2024, Borova was designated urban-type settlement. On this day, a new law entered into force which abolished this status, and Borova became a rural settlement.
