= Pervy May =

Pervy May Первый Май
- Village
- Location within Bashkortostan Location within Russia
- Coordinates: 54°25′N 59°41′E
- Country: Russia
- Region: Bashkortostan
- District: Uchalinsky District
- Time zone: UTC+5:00

Pervy May (Russian: Первый Май; Bashkir: Беренсе Май, Berense May) is a rural locality (a village) in Safarovsky Selsoviet, Uchalinsky District, Bashkortostan, Russia. The population was 184 as of 2010. There are 2 streets.

== Geography ==
Pervy May is located 32 km northeast of Uchaly (the district's administrative centre) by road. Safarovo is the nearest rural locality.
