= Vepryk, Kyiv Oblast =

Rural locality in Kyiv Oblast, Ukraine

Vepryk Веприк
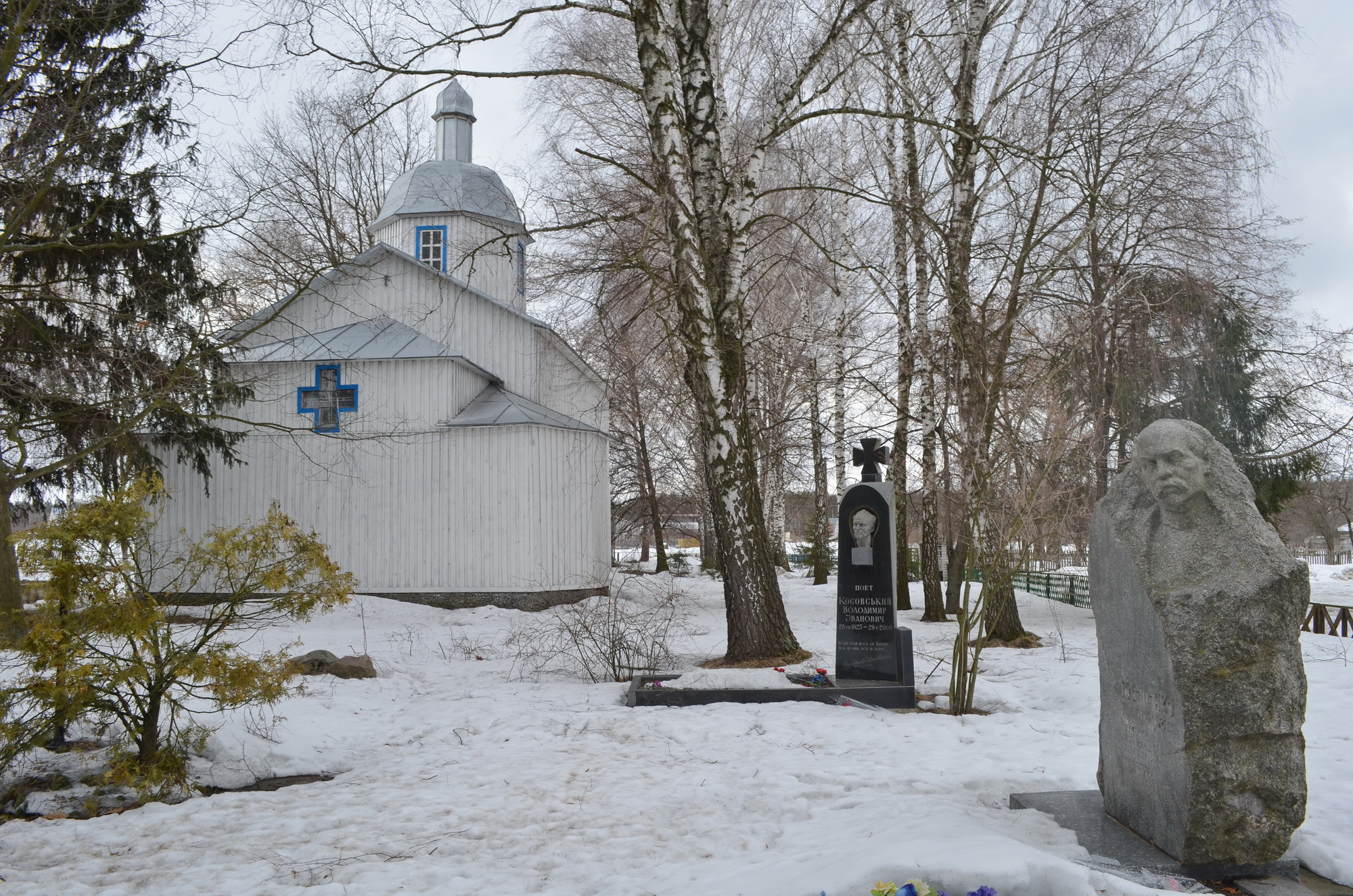
- Grave of Kyrylo Stetsenko near the wooden church in Vepryk

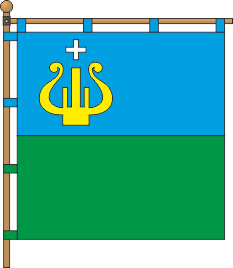
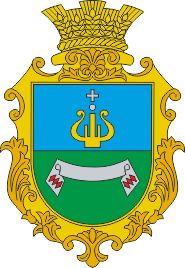
- Flag Coat of arms

- Location of Vepryk Vepryk (Ukraine)
- Coordinates: 50°06′24″N 29°48′21″E
- Country Oblast Raion: Ukraine; Kyiv Oblast; Fastiv Raion
- First mentioned: 1917

Area
  - Total: 4.92 km^{2} (1.90 sq mi)
- Elevation: 173 m (568 ft)

Population (2001)
  - Total: 1,053
  - Density: 214/km^{2} (554/sq mi)
- Postal code: 08531
- Area code: +380 4565

Vepryk (Ukrainian: Веприк) is a selo in Ukraine, in Fastiv Raion of Kyiv Oblast. It belongs to Fastiv urban hromada, one of the hromadas of Ukraine. The village has a population of 1,053. It is famous for being the place where Ukrainian composer Kyrylo Stetsenko died. His house is a currently a museum, and there is monument on his grave.

In the 19th century, a Jewish colony was founded in the village of Vepryk, an exemplary one for Jewish farmers.
