= Pyatnitskoye, Belgorod Oblast =

Urban locality in Belgorod Oblast, Russia

Coordinates: 50°25′21″N 37°50′01″E

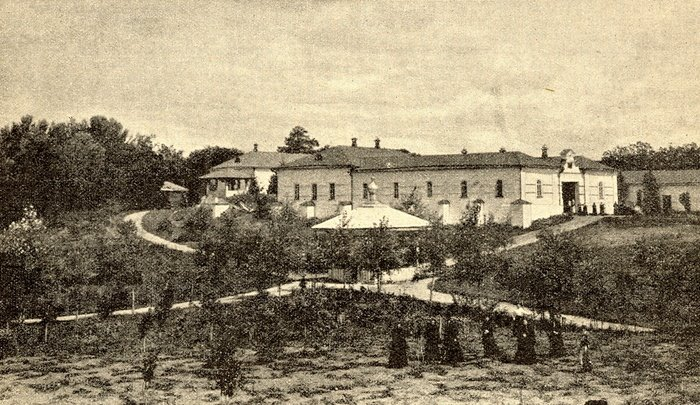
Nikolo-Tikhvinsky Monastery in Pyatnitskoye, Voronezh Governorate (now Belgorod Oblast)

Pyatnitskoye (Russian: Пя́тницкое) is an urban-type settlement in Volokonovsky District of Belgorod Oblast, Russia. Population: 4,160 (2021 census); 4,536 (2010 census); 4,793 (2002 census); 4,528 (1989 Soviet census).
