= Nefco =

International finance institution

Nefco - the Nordic Green Bank
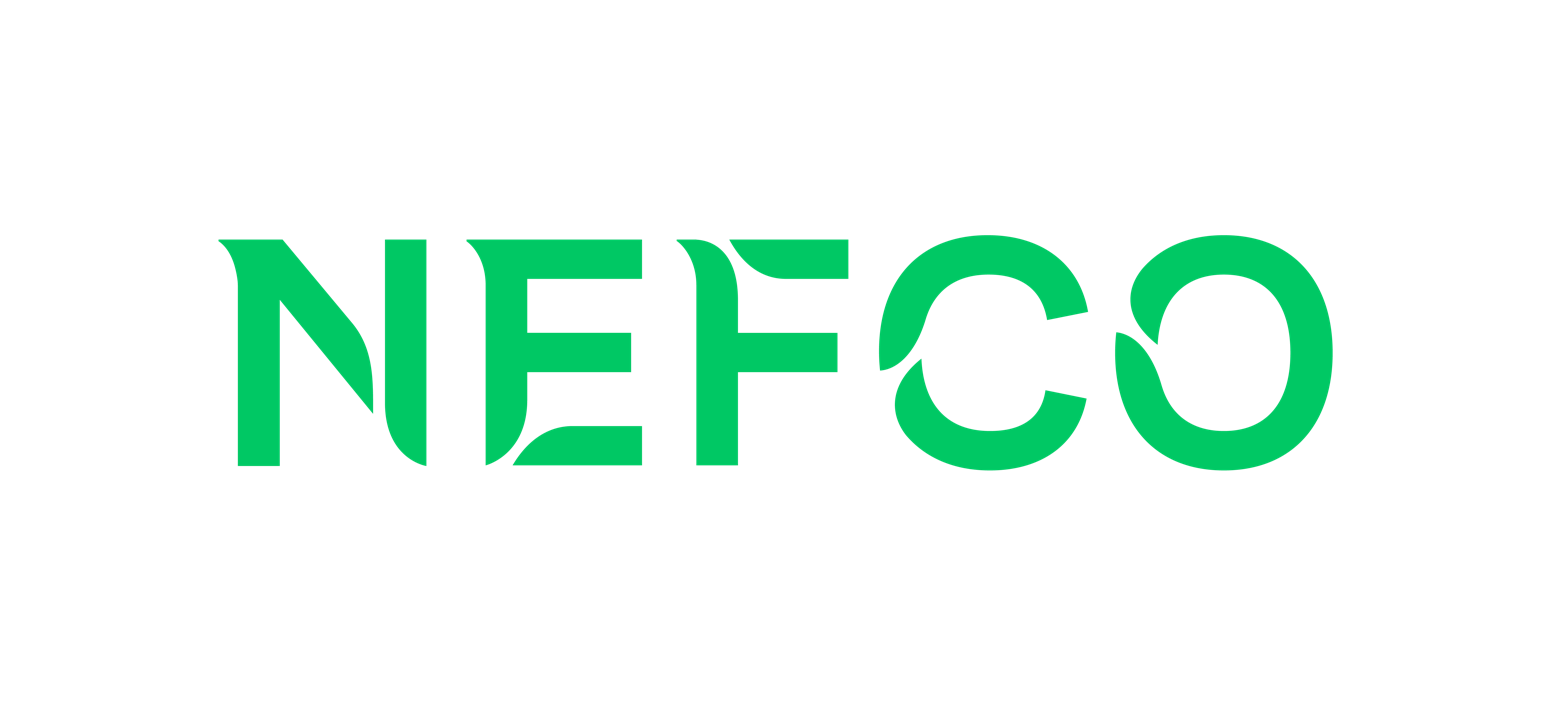
- Formerly: Nordic Environment Finance Corporation
- Type: International financial institutions
- Industry: Financing
- Headquarters: Helsinki, Finland
- Key people: Trond Moe, Managing Director
- AUM: €598 million
- Owner: The five Nordic countries: Denmark, Finland, Iceland, Norway and Sweden
- Website: www.nefco.int

Nefco - the Nordic Green Bank (or the Nordic Environment Finance Corporation) is an international finance institution. Nefco was established by the Nordic governments Denmark, Finland, Iceland, Norway and Sweden in 1990. In Eastern Europe, Nefco primarily finances municipal projects. Additionally, Nefco works with several green initiatives from the Arctic to Africa. Nefco is headquartered in Helsinki.

Nefco has a broad range of projects spread across different sectors, including: chemical, mineral and metals, food and engineering, agriculture, water treatment, power utilities, municipal services, waste management, nuclear remediation, environmental management and environmental equipment manufacturing.

To provide the capital necessary to support projects, Nefco works with its own paid-in capital and a series of different funding bodies. Nefco manages a number of trust funds and facilities such as the Nordic Project Fund (Nopef), the Arctic Council's Project Support Instrument, the HS Barents Hot Spots Facility, Beyond the Grid Fund for Africa, and a range of funds of the Governments of the Nordic countries. Nefco also implements projects funded by various public programmes of the European Union, along with multilateral development programmes such as the Eastern Europe Energy Efficiency and Environment Partnership (E5P) and the Northern Dimension Environmental Partnership (NDEP).

Nefco-funded projects are usually run in partnership with the enterprise or organisation that 'owns' the project. Emphasis is placed on direct investments from, for example, public-private partnerships and corporate public services.

== Activities in Russia and Belarus ==
The European Union sanctioned various Russian companies and individuals in 2014 after the Russian annexation of Ukraine's Crimean peninsula. Nefco winded down most of its cooperative projects. After the disputed Belarusian election in 2020 and the sequential protests, no new projects were funded in Belarus.

Following the full-scale Russian invasion of Ukraine in 2022, Nefco suspended the last remaining projects in the Russian Federation.
