= List of Einsatzgruppen =

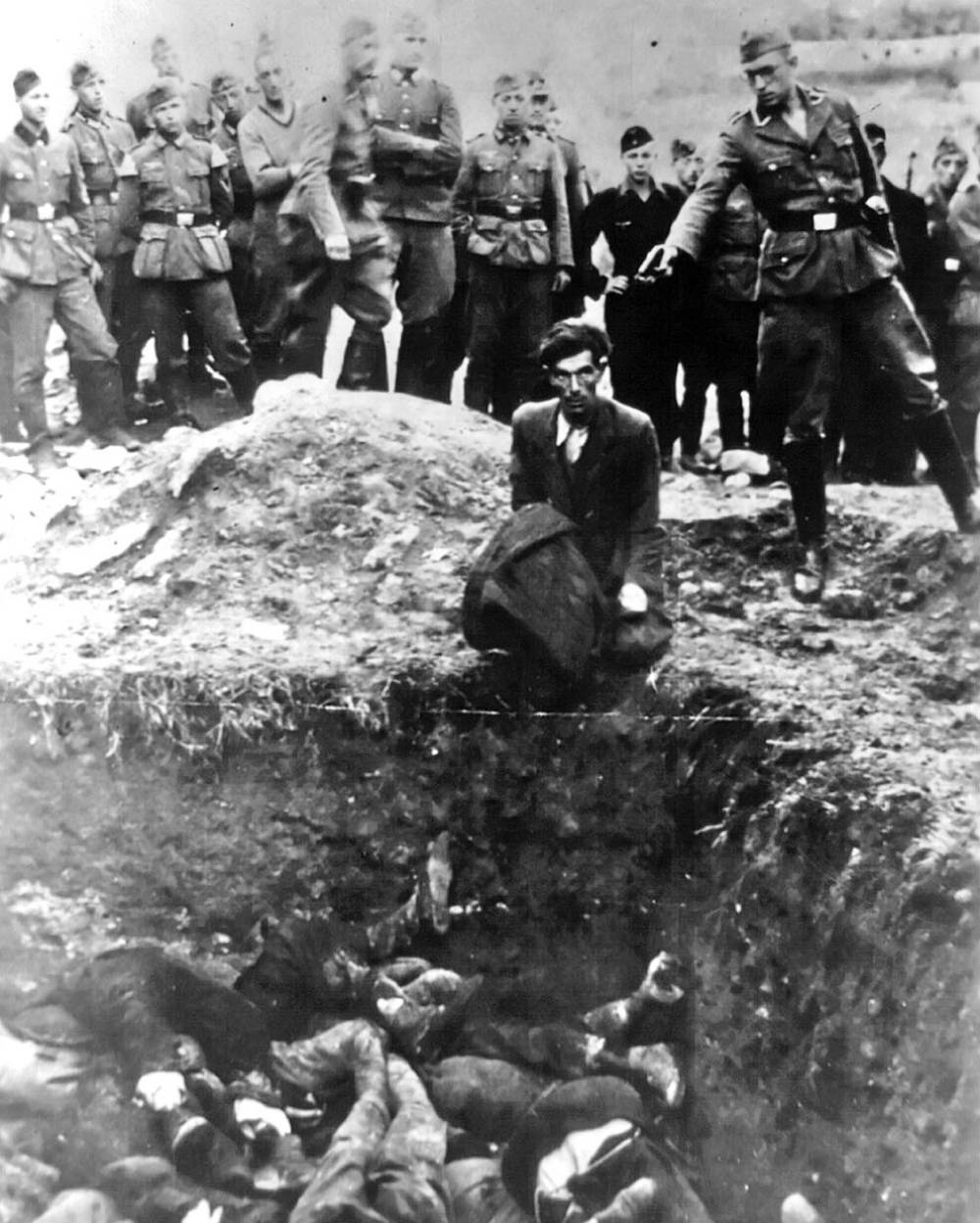
Although this photograph is often identified as The last Jew in Vinnitsa, it is in fact showing an unknown Jewish man—probably on 28 July 1941 in Berdychiv (Berditschew) and not Vinnitsya—about to be shot dead by a member of Einsatzgruppe D, a mobile death squad of the Nazi SS. The victim is kneeling beside a mass grave already containing bodies; behind, a group of SS and Reich Labour Service men watch.

Einsatzgruppen (German for "task forces", "deployment groups"; singular Einsatzgruppe; official full name Einsatzgruppen der Sicherheitspolizei und des SD) were Schutzstaffel (SS) paramilitary death squads of Nazi Germany that were responsible for mass killings, primarily by shooting, during World War II. The Einsatzgruppen had a leading role in the implementation of the Final Solution of the Jewish question (Die Endlösung der Judenfrage) in territories conquered by Nazi Germany.

Under the direction of Reichsführer-SS Heinrich Himmler and the supervision of SS-Obergruppenführer Reinhard Heydrich, the Einsatzgruppen operated in territories occupied by the German armed forces following the invasion of Poland in September 1939 and Operation Barbarossa (the invasion of the Soviet Union) in June 1941. Historian Raul Hilberg estimates that between 1941 and 1945 the Einsatzgruppen and related agencies and foreign auxiliary personnel killed more than two million people, including 1.3 million Jews. The total number of Jews murdered during the Holocaust is estimated at 5.5 to six million people.

After the close of the World War II, 24 senior leaders of the Einsatzgruppen were prosecuted in the Einsatzgruppen Trial in 1947–48, charged with crimes against humanity and war crimes. Fourteen death sentences and two life sentences were among the judgements. Four additional Einsatzgruppe leaders were later tried and executed by other nations.

== Invasion of Poland ==
Seven Einsatzgruppen of battalion strength operated in Poland. Each was subdivided into four Einsatzkommandos of company strength.

- Einsatzgruppe I, commanded by SS-Standartenführer Bruno Streckenbach, acted with 14th Army
- Einsatzgruppe II, SS-Obersturmbannführer Emanuel Schäfer, acted with 10th Army
- Einsatzgruppe III, SS-Obersturmbannführer und Regierungsrat Dr. Herbert Fischer, acted with 8th Army
- Einsatzgruppe IV, SS-Brigadeführer Lothar Beutel, acted with 4th Army
- Einsatzgruppe V, SS-Standartenfürer Ernst Damzog, acted with 3rd Army
- Einsatzgruppe VI, SS-Oberführer Erich Naumann, acted in Wielkopolska
- Einsatzgruppe VII, SS-Obergruppenführer Udo von Woyrsch and SS-Gruppenführer Otto Rasch, acted in Upper Silesia and Cieszyn Silesia

== Invasion of the Soviet Union and other countries ==
Organisation
Einsatzgruppe	Leader	Subgroups	
Einsatzgruppe A (Baltic states)	SS-Brigadeführer; Dr. Franz Walter Stahlecker (until 23 March 1942)	Sonderkommandos 1a and 1b (German for special forces; not to be confused with the Sonderkommandos in the concentration camps); Einsatzkommandos 2 and 3. Attached to Army Group North	
Einsatzgruppe B (Belarus)	SS-Brigadeführer; Arthur Nebe (until October 1941)	Sonderkommandos 7a and 7b; Einsatzkommandos 8 and 9; A special force under Dr. Franz Six in case Moscow was captured. Attached to Army Group Center	
Einsatzgruppe C (Northern and central Ukraine)	SS-Gruppenführer; Dr. Otto Rasch (until October 1941)	Sonderkommandos 4a and 4b (Sonderkommando 4 a was commanded by Paul Blobel); Einsatzkommandos 5 and 6. Attached to Army Group South	
Einsatzgruppe D (Bessarabia, Southern Ukraine, Crimea, and Caucasus)	SS-Gruppenführer; Prof. Otto Ohlendorf (until June 1942)	Sonderkommandos 10a and 10b; Einsatzkommandos 11a, 11b, and 12. Attached to 11th Army	
Einsatzgruppe E (Croatia)	SS-Obersturmbannführer Ludwig Teichmann, SS-Standartenführer Günther Herrmann, SS-Standartenführer Wilhelm Fuchs	Five Einsatzkommandos located in Vinkovci, Sarajevo, Banja Luka, Knin, and Zagreb	
Einsatzgruppe F (Army Group South)			
Einsatzgruppe G (Romania, Hungary, Ukraine)	SS-Standartenführer Dr. Josef Kreuzer	Einsatzkommandos 11 and 12	
Einsatzgruppe H (Slovakia)	SS-Obersturmbannführer Josef Witiska	Einsatzkommandos 13 and 14, formed in Brno 31 August 1944 as part of the German invasion of Slovakia concurrent with the Slovak National Uprising	
Einsatzgruppe K (with 5th Panzer Army in the Ardennes offensive)	SS-Oberführer Dr. Emanuel Schäfer		
Einsatzgruppe L (with 6th Panzer Army in the Ardennes offensive)	SS-Standartenführer Dr. Ludwig Hahn		
Einsatzgruppe Griechenland (Greece)	SS-Sturmbannführer Dr. Ludwig Hahn		
Einsatzgruppe Iltis (Carinthia (Slovenia))	SS-Standartenführer Paul Blobel		
Einsatzkommando Luxemburg (Luxembourg)			
Einsatzgruppe Norwegen (Norway)	SS-Oberführer Dr. Franz Walter Stahlecker		
Einsatzgruppe Serbien (Yugoslavia)	SS-Standartenführer Wilhelm Fuchs, SS-Gruppenführer August Meysner		
Einsatzgruppe for Special Purposes (eastern Poland)	SS-Brigadeführer und Generalmajor der Polizei; Karl Eberhard Schöngarth		
Einsatzkommando Tilsit (Lithuania, Poland)			
Einsatzkommando Tunis (Tunis)	SS-Obersturmbannführer Walter Rauff		
Proposed Einsatzkommando Egypt (Middle East)	SS-Obersturmbannführer Walter Rauff		Planned for Jews resident in the Middle East, including Mandatory Palestine. Never organised.
Proposed Einsatzgruppe (United Kingdom)	SS-Standartenführer Dr. Franz Six	Proposed. Six Einsatzkommandos would have been located in London, Manchester, Birmingham, Bristol, Liverpool, and either Edinburgh or Glasgow. These death squads would have been charged with the elimination of civilian resistance members and Jews in the United Kingdom. Due to the cancellation of the planned invasion of Britain (Operation Sealion), the units never saw active service.	

== Bibliography ==
- "Book review: Tasks of the Einsatzgruppen by Alfred Streim". Museum of Tolerance Online Multimedia Learning Center, Annual 4, Chapter 9. Los Angeles: Simon Wiesenthal Center. Archived from the original on 26 August 2012.
- Conze, Eckart; Frei, Norbert; Hayes, Peter; Zimmermann, Moshe (2010). Das Amt und die Vergangenheit : deutsche Diplomaten im Dritten Reich und in der Bundesrepublik (in German). Munich: Karl Blessing. ISBN 978-3-89667-430-2.
- Crowe, David (2007) [2004]. Oskar Schindler: The Untold Account of his Life, Wartime Activities and the True Story Behind the List. New York: Basic Books. ISBN 978-0-465-00253-5.
- Dams, Carsten; Stolle, Michael (2012) [2008]. Die Gestapo: Herrschaft und Terror im Dritten Reich. Becksche Reihe (in German). Munich: Beck. ISBN 978-3-406-62898-6.
- Evans, Richard J. (2008). The Third Reich at War. New York: Penguin Group. ISBN 978-0-14-311671-4.
- "Reflections on the Holocaust: "The Einsatzgruppen"". Encyclopædia Britannica.
- Larsen, Stein Ugelvik (2008). Meldungen aus Norwegen 1940-1945: Die geheimen Lagesberichte des Befehlshabers der Sicherheitspolizei und des SD in Norwegen, 1 (in German). Munich: Oldenburg. ISBN 978-3-486-55891-3.
- LEO Dictionary Team. "LEO Deutsch-Englisches Wörterbuch "einsatzgruppe"" (in German). Dict.leo.org.
- Longerich, Peter (2010). Holocaust: The Nazi Persecution and Murder of the Jews. Oxford; New York: Oxford University Press. ISBN 978-0-19-280436-5.
- MacLean, French L. (1999). The Field Men: The SS Officers Who Led the Einsatzkommandos—The Nazi Mobile Killing Units. Schiffer Military History. Madison, WI: Schiffer. ISBN 978-0-7643-0754-6.
- Mallmann, Klaus-Michael; Cüppers, Martin; Smith, Krista (2010). Nazi Palestine: The Plans for the Extermination of the Jews in Palestine. New York: Enigma. ISBN 978-1-929631-93-3.
- Rhodes, Richard (2002). Masters of Death: The SS-Einsatzgruppen and the Invention of the Holocaust. New York: Vintage Books. ISBN 0-375-70822-7.
- Shelach, Menachem (1989). "Sajmište: An Extermination Camp in Serbia". In Marrus, Michael Robert (ed.). The Victims of the Holocaust: Historical Articles on the Destruction of European Jews. Vol. 2. Westport, CT: Meckler.
- Shirer, William L. (1960). The Rise and Fall of the Third Reich. New York: Simon & Schuster. LCCN 60-6729.
- Weale, Adrian (2010). Army of Evil: A History of the SS. New York; Toronto: Penguin Group. ISBN 978-0-451-23791-0.
