= Valery Pyatnitsky =

Ukrainian politician

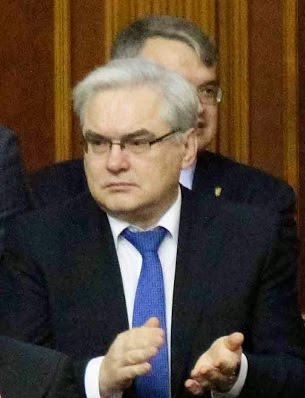
Valeriy Pyatnytskyi in 2014

Valery Teziyovych Pyatnitsky (Ukrainian: Валерій Тезійович Пятницький) is a Ukrainian politician and statesman. Government's Commissioner for European Integration (since 2011).

== Biography ==
=== Early years. Education. Scientific activity ===
Valery Pyatnitsky was born April 19, 1962, in Chervona Motovylivka (Fastiv Raion, Kyiv Oblast, Ukrainian SSR).

In 1985 graduated from faculty of cybernetics in Taras Shevchenko State University of Kyiv (specialty «Economic Cybernetics», qualification «economist-mathematician»).

During 1987–1990 – PhD student of Taras Shevchenko State University of Kyiv. in 1999–2002 – doctorant in Kyiv National University of Trade and Economics.

Candidate of Economics Sciences. Docent.

=== Career ===
Upon graduation in 1985, he first worked for a year as an engineer for the research department of Taras Shevchenko State University of Kyiv. He was then a trainee lecturer at the same university within the Department of Economic Cybernetics for a year, before returning to be an engineer for the Laboratory of Economic Cybernetics. In 1990, he was appointed an assistant docent within the Department of Economic Cybernetics for Kyiv University, which he did for 6 more years rising through the ranks to become an associate professor.

In 1996, he left Kyiv University to work for the Department of Multilateral Economic Cooperation within the Ministry of Foreign Economic Relations and Trade of Ukraine. There, he worked as deputy chairman of thee department, before eventually being promoted to the head of the department by 1999. In 1999 he returned to being a lecturer at Kyiv University, serving as a docent for the university until 2003. He then returned to the Ministry of Economy, becoming State Secretary for European Integration.

In 2003, he was promoted to first deputy Minister of Economy and European Integration of Ukraine, while simultaneously serving as deputy chairman of the Joint Parliamentary-Government Committee of Ukraine's integration into the WTO until 2005. In 2005, he briefly served as an adviser to the Vice Prime Minister of Ukraine as a leading expert in the trade policy of Ukraine. Then, from 2005 to 2011, he returned to the Ministry of Economic, becoming its deputy minister. On 13 July 2011, he was appointed Government's Commissioner for European Integration

Pyatnitsky was appointed by the Yatsenyuk Government to lead the newly created Institution of Trade Representative in Ukraine on 20 August 2014. Then Minister of Economical Development and Trade Pavlo Sheremeta disagreed with this appointment and resigned over it (he felt that he as Minister himself should have nominated candidates for his deputies) on 21 August 2014.

== Awards ==
- Order of Prince Yaroslav the Wise (5th class, 2008).
