= Volokonovka, Volokonovsky District, Belgorod Oblast =

Volokonovka Волоконовка
- Town
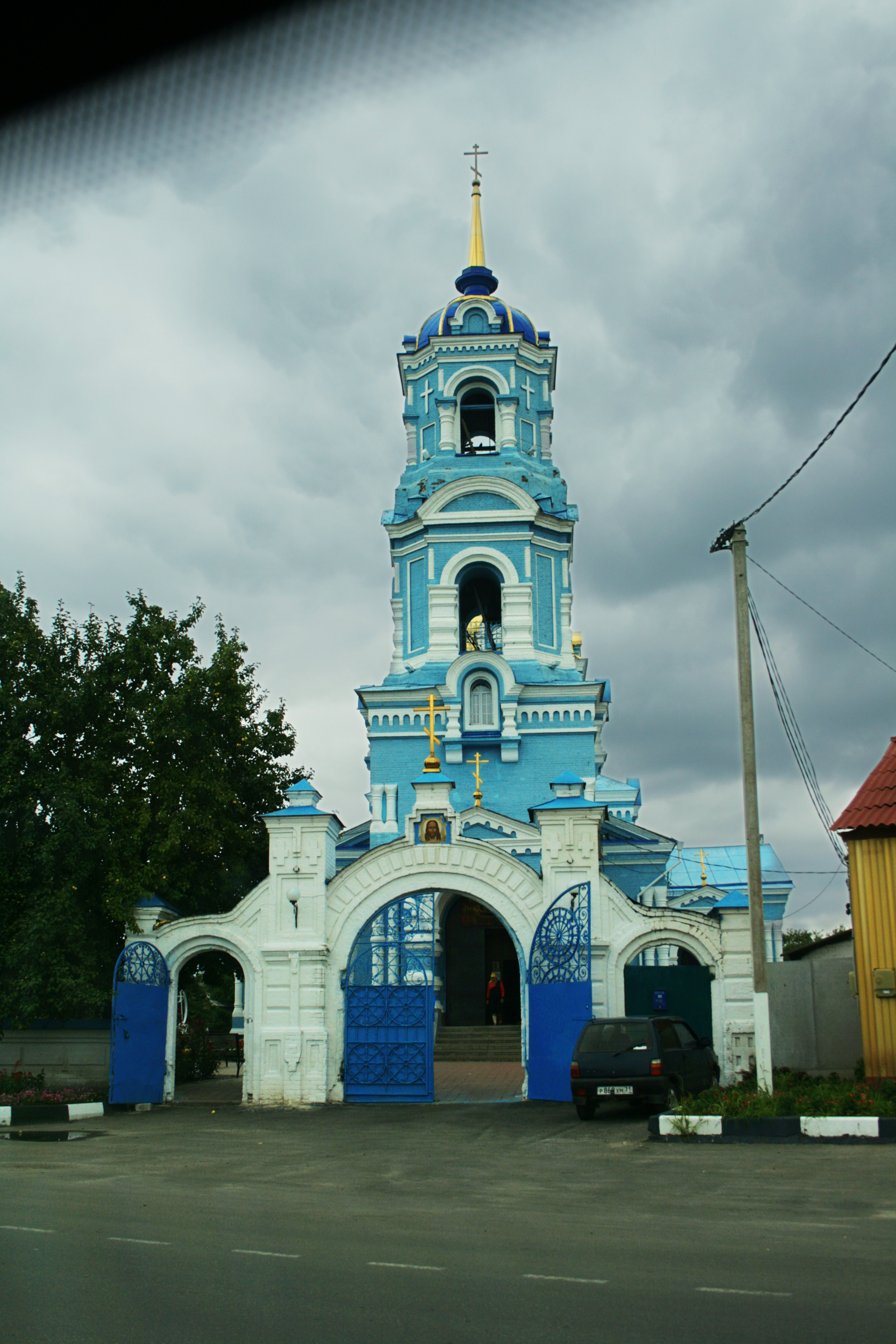

- Flag Coat of arms
- Interactive map of Volokonovka
- Location of Volokonovka Volokonovka (Belgorod Oblast)
- Coordinates: 50°29′02″N 37°52′17″E
- Country: Russia
- Federal subject: Belgorod Oblast
- Founded: 1731
- Town status since: 1961

Population
  - Estimate (2025): 10,115 )

Municipal status
  - Municipal district: Volokonovsky Municipal District
  - Urban settlement: Volokonovsky Urban Settlement
  - Capital of: Volokonovsky Municipal District, Volokonovsky Urban Settlement
- Time zone: UTC+3 (MSK)
- Postal code: 309650
- Dialing code: +7 47235
- OKTMO ID: 14630151051

Volokonovka (Russian: Волоко́новка) is a town in Belgorod Oblast, Russia. It is the administrative center of Volokonovsky District. Population: 10,428 (2021 census); 11,552 (2010 census); 12,210 (2002 census); 12,635 (1989 Soviet census).

== Geography ==
The town is located on the left bank of the river Oskol (Don basin), 30 kilometres (19 mi) south of Novy Oskol.

== History ==
The settlement was founded in 1731. According to the 1877 census, there were 6,240 residents in the town. Status of urban-type settlements was granted since 1961.

On June 25, 2011, a monument to Grigory Volkonsky, the founder of the settlement, was unveiled.
