= Volokonovsky District =

Volokonovsky District Волоконовский район (Russian)
- District
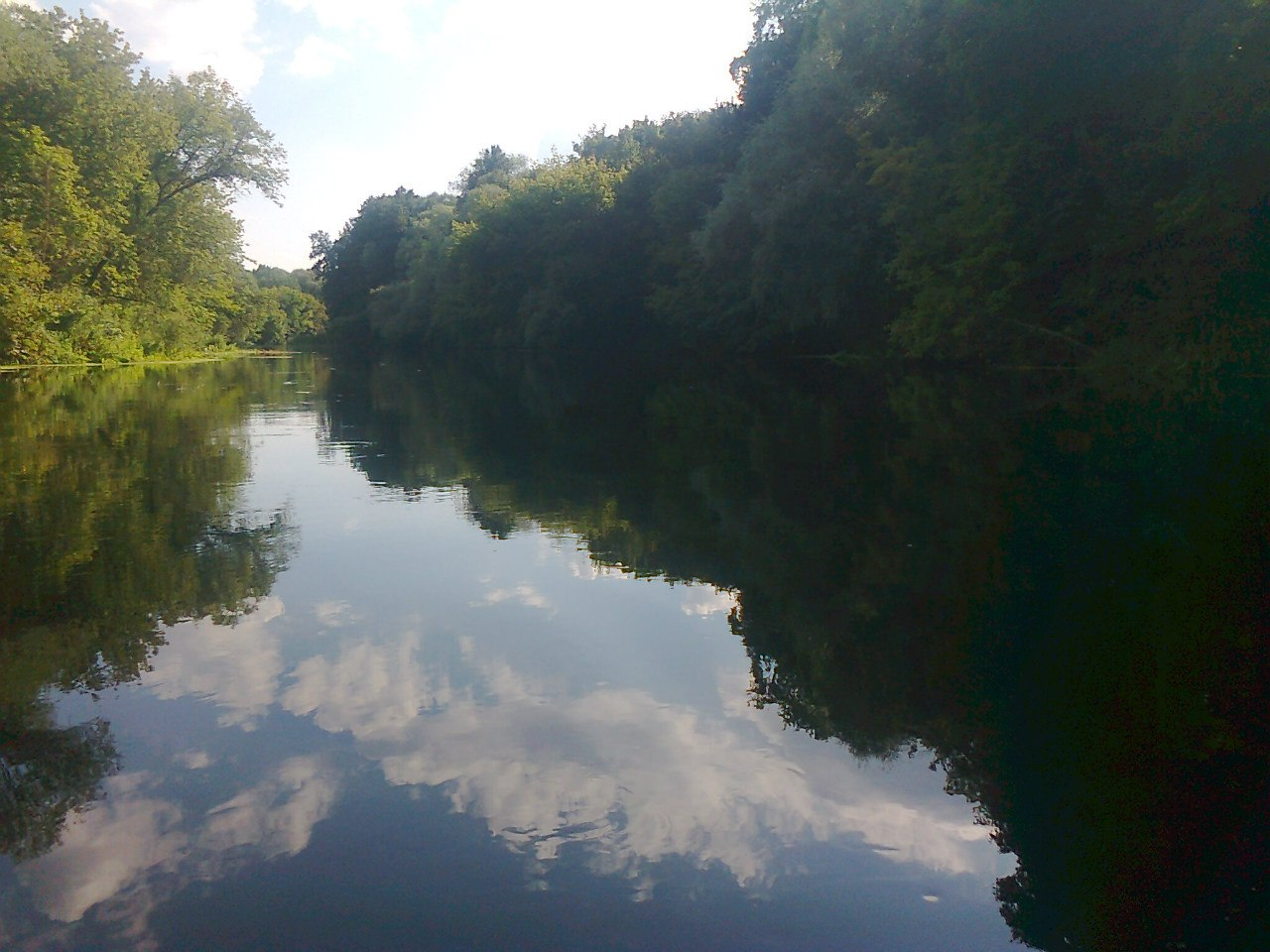
- The Oskol River near the work settlement of Pyatnitskoye in Volokonovsky District

- Flag Coat of arms
- Location of Volokonovsky District in Belgorod Oblast
- Coordinates: 50°24′N 37°41′E
- Country: Russia
- Federal subject: Belgorod Oblast
- Established: 1928
- Administrative center: Volokonovka

Area
  - Total: 1,287.7 km^{2} (497.2 sq mi)

Population (2010 Census)
  - Total: 32,769
  - Estimate (2015): 31,382
  - Density: 25.448/km^{2} (65.909/sq mi)
  - Urban: 49.1%
  - Rural: 50.9%

Administrative structure
  - Administrative divisions: 2 Work settlements and settlement okrugs, 12 Rural okrugs
  - Inhabited localities: 2 urban-type settlements, 80 rural localities

Municipal structure
  - Municipally incorporated as: Volokonovsky Municipal District
  - Municipal divisions: 2 urban settlements, 12 rural settlements
- Time zone: UTC+3 (MSK)
- OKTMO ID: 14630000
- Website: http://voladm.ru

Population of Volokonovsky District
- 2021 Census: 29,276
- 2010 Census: 32,769
- 2002 Census: 35,616
- 1989 Census: 36,598
- 1979 Census: 39,490

Volokonovsky District (Russian: Волоко́новский райо́н) is an administrative district (raion), one of the twenty-one in Belgorod Oblast, Russia. As a municipal division, it is incorporated as Volokonovsky Municipal District. It is located in the south of the oblast. Its administrative center is the urban locality (a work settlement) of Volokonovka. As of the 2021 Census, the total population of the district was 29,276, with the population of Volokonovka accounting for 35.6% of that number.
