= Karol Miarka =

Karol Miarka may refer to:

== People ==
- Karol Miarka (father) (1825–1882), Polish social and national activist
- Karol Miarka (son) (1856–1919), Polish social and national activist

== Places ==
- Karol Miarka Liceum (Żory, Poland)
