= Śmiłowice, Mikołów =

Śmiłowice
- Sołectwo of Mikołów
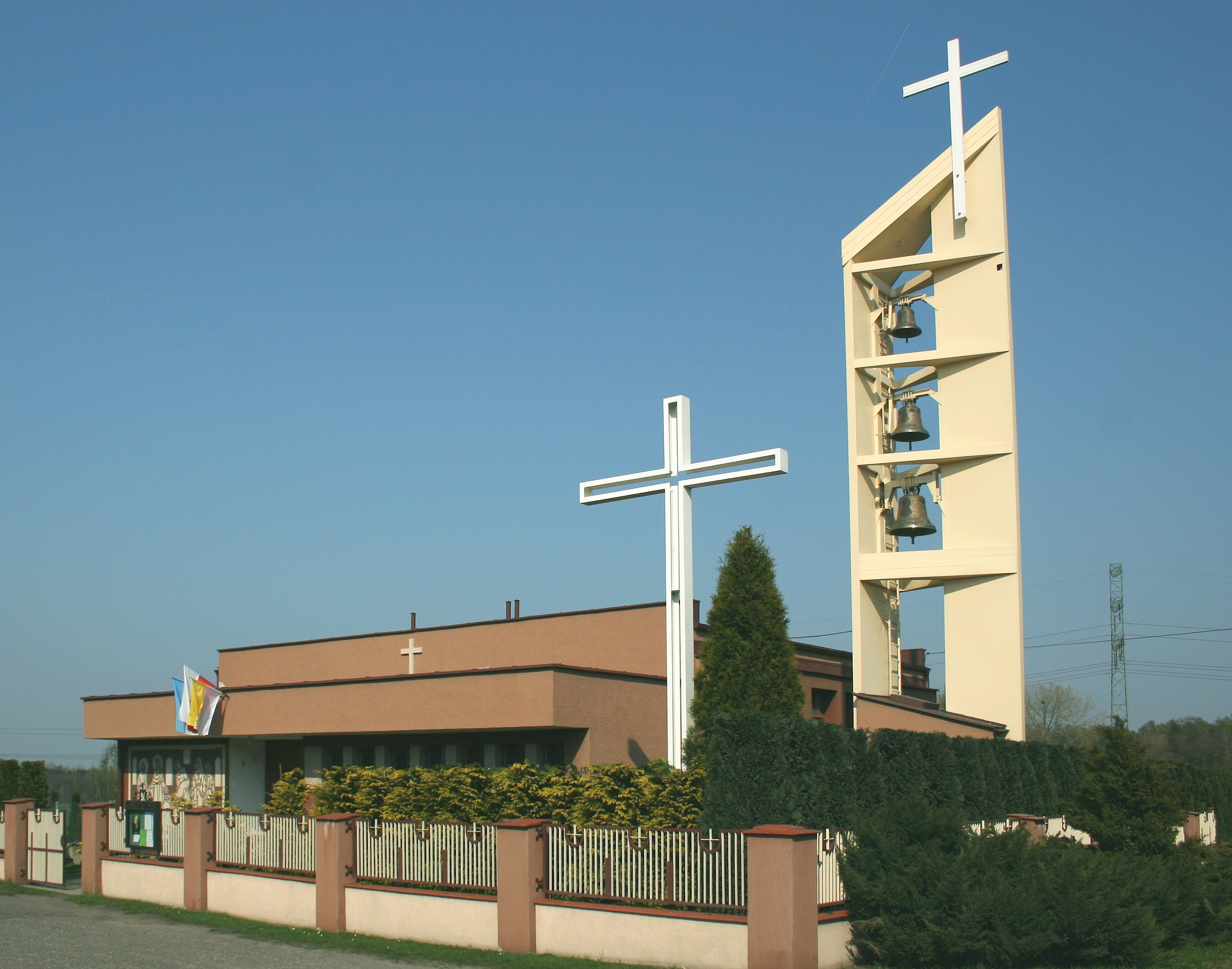
- Our Lady of Częstochowa church
- Interactive map of Śmiłowice
- Coordinates: 50°12′05″N 18°51′40″E
- Country: Poland
- Voivodeship: Silesian
- County/City: Mikołów
- Time zone: UTC+1 (CET)
  - Summer (DST): UTC+2 (CEST)
- Area code: (+48) 032

Śmiłowice (German: Smilowitz) is a sołectwo of Mikołów, Silesian Voivodeship, southern Poland. It was an independent village but as a part of gmina Mokre was administratively merged into Mikołów in 1975.

== History ==
The village was first mentioned in the 14th century. During the political upheaval caused by Matthias Corvinus the land around Pszczyna was overtaken by Casimir II, Duke of Cieszyn, who sold it in 1517 to the Hungarian magnates of the Thurzó family, forming the Pless state country. In the accompanying sales document issued on 21 February 1517 the village was mentioned as Smilowicze.

After World War I in the Upper Silesia plebiscite 231 out of 266 voters in Śmiłowice voted in favour of joining Poland, against 35 opting for staying in Germany.

In years 1945-1954 it was a seat of a gmina encompassing also Mokre, Borowa Wieś, Paniowy and Stara Kuźnia (now part of Halemba district of Ruda Śląska). In 1973 the gmina was re-established but with the seat moved to Mokre, and two years later absorbed by Mikołów (apart from Stara Kuźnia).
