= Saint George's Church, Cieszyn =

Church building in Cieszyn, Poland

Coordinates: 49.7527°N 18.6286°E

Saint George's Church
- Kościół św. Jerzego
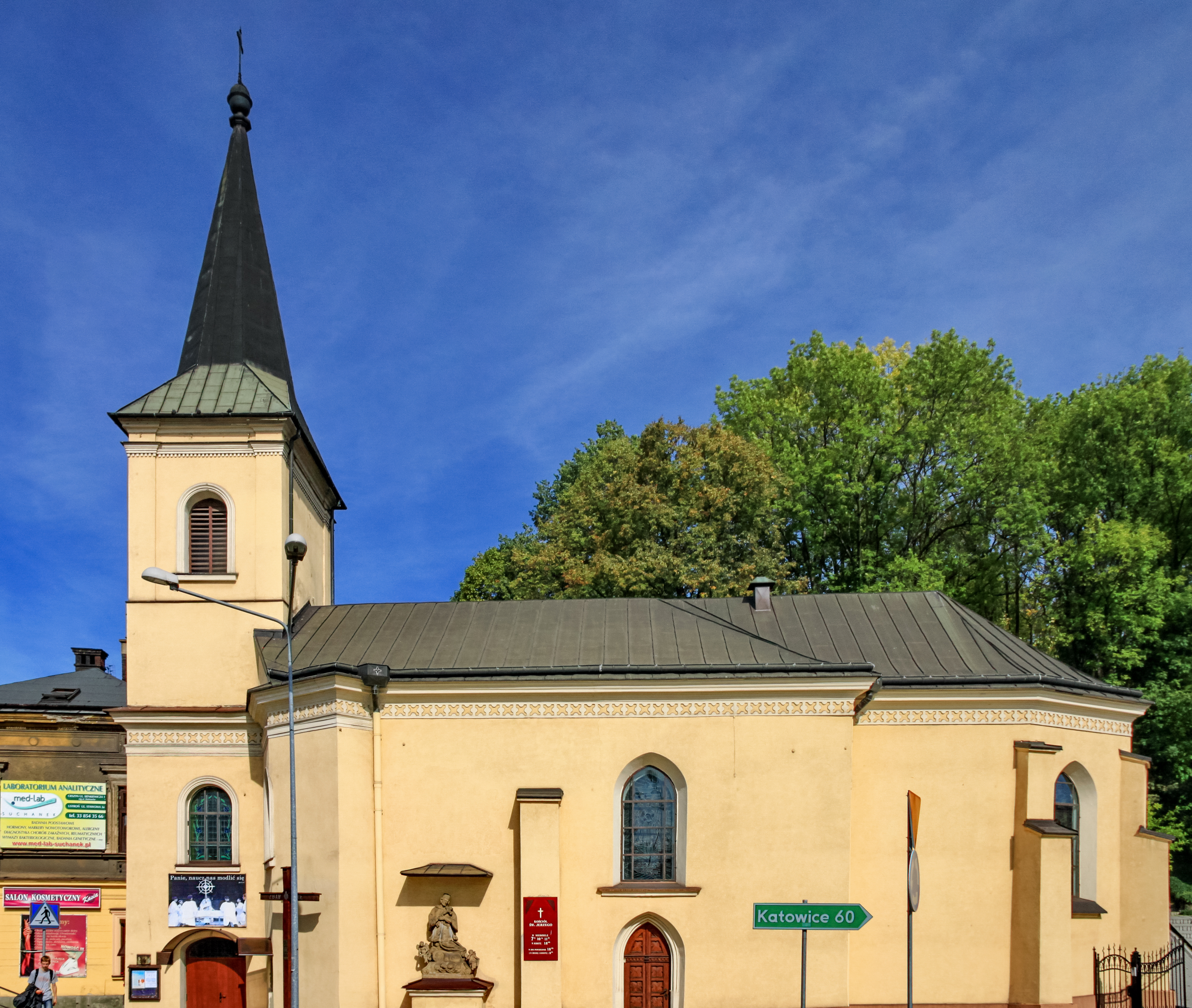

Religion
- Affiliation: Catholicism
- District: Diocese of Bielsko and Żywiec
- Patron: Saint George

Location
- Municipality: Cieszyn
- Country: Poland
- Interactive map of Saint George's Church

Architecture
- Completed: 14th/15th century

Saint George's Church is a church from the turn of the 15th century, located in Cieszyn at Liburnia 1 street. Initially it was a chapel serving a local asylum and later a hospital church.

== History ==
It is assumed that the church was created in 1327-1404, during the reign of duke Kazimierz I of Cieszyn. His crest includes a golden eagle without a crown on a blue background, similar to the one that can be seen in the presbytery of the church, so one of the dukes might indeed be the founder of the church. The church was built outside the medieval walls of the city, on the so called Frysztackie Suburbs, with a cemetery near it dated 1472 and the first hospital for the sick and the poor in Cieszyn.

The church was mentioned in documents once again in 1442, when it became a succursal church of saint Maria Magdalene church. At this time the church was devoted to the Cross of Jesus Christ.

In 1653 the hospital church was once again consecrated, and in 1751 a church bell was funded, which in 1826 and 1866 was remelted for military purposes.

In 1804-1805 a new tower on the western side was added to the church and in 1840-1855 the church went through a general overhaul. In 1882 fire destroyed the church asylum and from that time the church was no longer a hospital church.

During the partitions masses were celebrated only occasionally; on the feast of saint George, the feast of Our Lady of Sorrows and on the Cross Days and the All Souls’ Day.

After the cassation of the Jesuits order in 1773 in Cieszyn and Cieszyn Silesia Czech became the dominant language (which was related to services in this language). Czech Jesuits were spreading the cult of saint John of Nepomuk, which is related to placing a sculpture of the saint on the right side of the entrance to the church.

After World War I the church was taken care of by German Catholics and masses were offered in German.

At the beginning of the 20th century another bell was founded and consecrated in autumn 1922.

During the occupation masses were said only on the occasion of the feast of St. George and Our Lady of Sorrows. In 1945 retreating German troops blew up a nearby bridge on Bobrówka river. As the result of the explosion all the stained glass windows in the church were destroyed, a part of the roof was torn and the vault broken. Renovation of the church took place in 1950-1953 version and was attended by the parish priest, father Lichota.

In 1961, in fear of influences of the National Church Sunday services were offered on a regular basis.

In the summer of 1973 the church went through a general overhaul, when a jubilee of 550 years of existence was celebrated. On this occasion, on 1 September 1974 a solemn mass was concelebrated by bishop Józef Kurpas.

By 1901 behind the church there was a graveyard. Currently only a few tombstones remain to be seen. This was the burial place of, inter alia, Karol Miarka and Paweł Stalmach.

== Architecture ==
The temple bears traces of the Gothic style. It is made of brick, has one nave, a one-arch three-sided presbytery covered by the cross-ribbed vault. In the presbytery there is a seventeenth century epitaph of Anna Heinel – a wife of a chalcographer from Cieszyn and his family – founded by Galen Heinel with the initials G.H.A.H. And unknown coats of arms.

On the west side of the church there is an adjacent quadrangular tower built in 1806. The side door leading to the sacristy is closed by a steep arch. In the entrance to the sacristy and to the nave (from the south) there are Gothic portals and fragments of Gothic polychrome from the 15th century over the vault. In the spanner of the vault there is a disc with the emblem of the Piasts. The nave is built on a square plan, and splayed windows have Gothic arches.

== Holy masses ==
Holly mass is celebrated on the following days:

Sundays and holy days of obligation: 7.35 am, 10.05 am, 11.30 am

Monday: 6.00 pm

Tuesday: 6.00 pm

Wednesday: 8.00

Thursday: 6.00 pm

Friday: 6.00 pm

Saturday: 8.00 am, 6.00 pm (Sunday mass)

== Trivia ==
There is an on-line camera installed in the church showing a live view of the altar.
