= Kamionka, Mikołów =

Kamionka
- Mikołów District
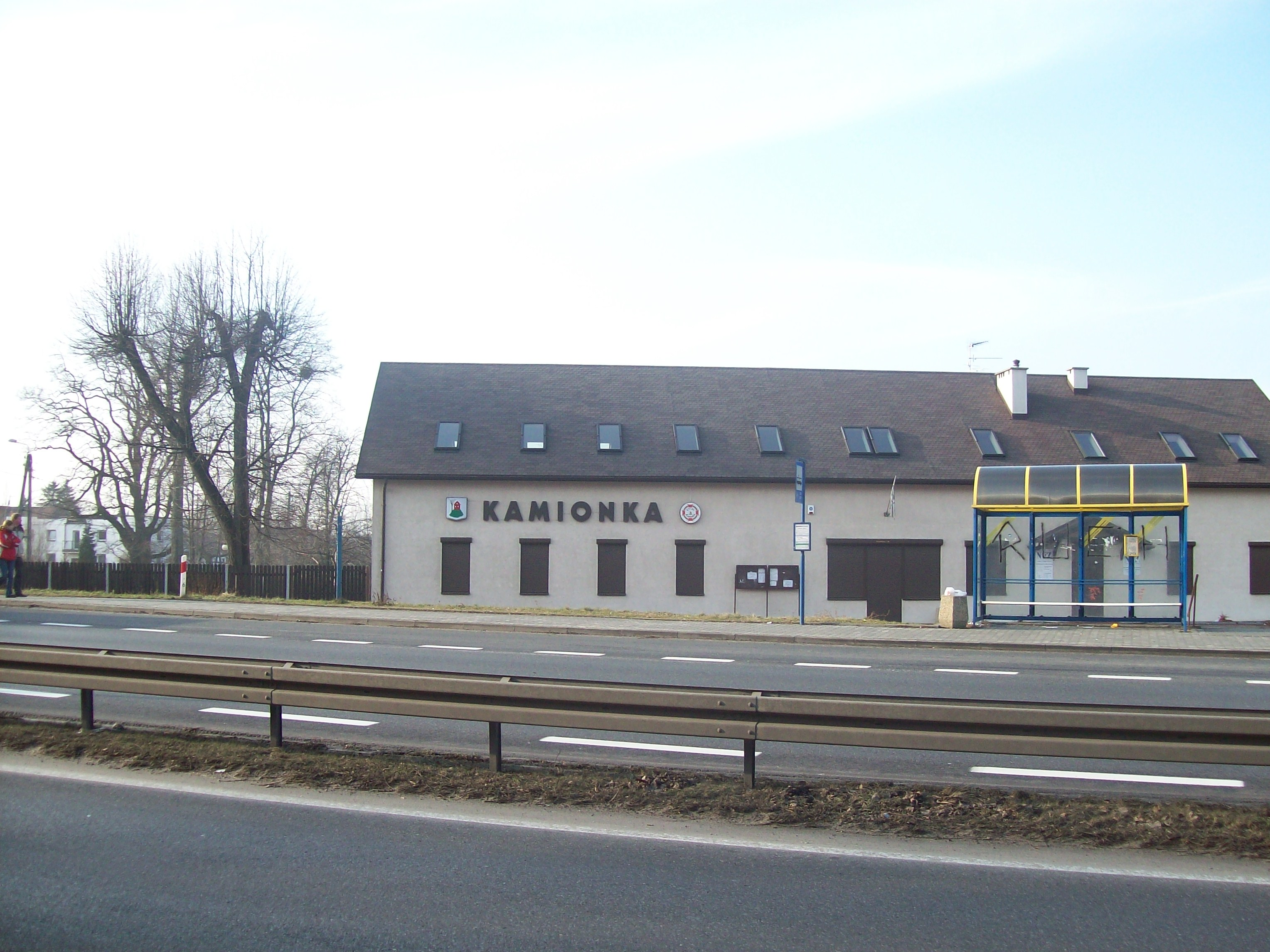
- Fire station
- Interactive map of Kamionka
- Coordinates: 50°11′20.24″N 18°55′16.4″E
- Country: Poland
- Voivodeship: Silesian
- County/City: Mikołów
- Time zone: UTC+1 (CET)
  - Summer (DST): UTC+2 (CEST)
- Area code: (+48) 032

Kamionka is a dzielnica (district) in the north-east of Mikołów, Silesian Voivodeship, southern Poland. It was an independent village but was administratively merged into Mikołów in 1935.

It is located alongside national road 81.

== History ==
The village was established in the 18th century. It was first mentioned in 1760 but the buildings existed about 30 year earlier. It initially belonged to Śmiłowice, in 1812 it became an independent municipality.

After World War I in the Upper Silesia plebiscite 184 out of 195 voters in Kamionka voted in favour of joining Poland, against 11 opting for staying in Germany.
