= Karol Miarka (son) =

Polish printer, publisher, and social activist (1856-1919)

- Born: 11 June 1856; Pielgrzymowice, Kingdom of Prussia
- Died: 12 May 1919 (aged 62); Racibórz
- Occupations: printer, publisher

Karol Miarka known as the Younger or Son (11 June 1856 – 12 May 1919) was a Polish printer and publisher, social activist in Upper Silesia, fighting to maintain Polishness.

== Biography ==
He was the son of Karol. He graduated from the gymnasium in Cieszyn. After his father, he took over a printing shop in Mikołów, which he turned into a professional printing company. He printed books (including books written by Mickiewicz, Slowacki, Krasiński), calendars and songbooks in mass quantities and then distributed them to the residents of villages and small towns. He received a gold medal for his publications shown at the 1894 National Exhibition in Lviv. Miarka's Mikołów printing house also published calendars. Very popular in Silesia was the Kalendarz Mariański which in 1898 reached a gigantic circulation of 100,000 copies for the time. In 1910, he sold the publishing house to Adam Napieralski's press concern. From 1912 he ran a Literary and Publishing Office in Racibórz.

On 10 June 1920 the publishing house of Karol Miarka also printed the first issue of the satirical magazine Kocynder.

== See also ==
- Karol Miarka – his father

== Bibliography ==
- Mieczysław Pater, Karol Miarka – drukarz, Polski Słownik Biograficzny, tom XX, wyd. 1975
