= Bujaków, Mikołów =

Bojków
- Sołectwo of Mikołów
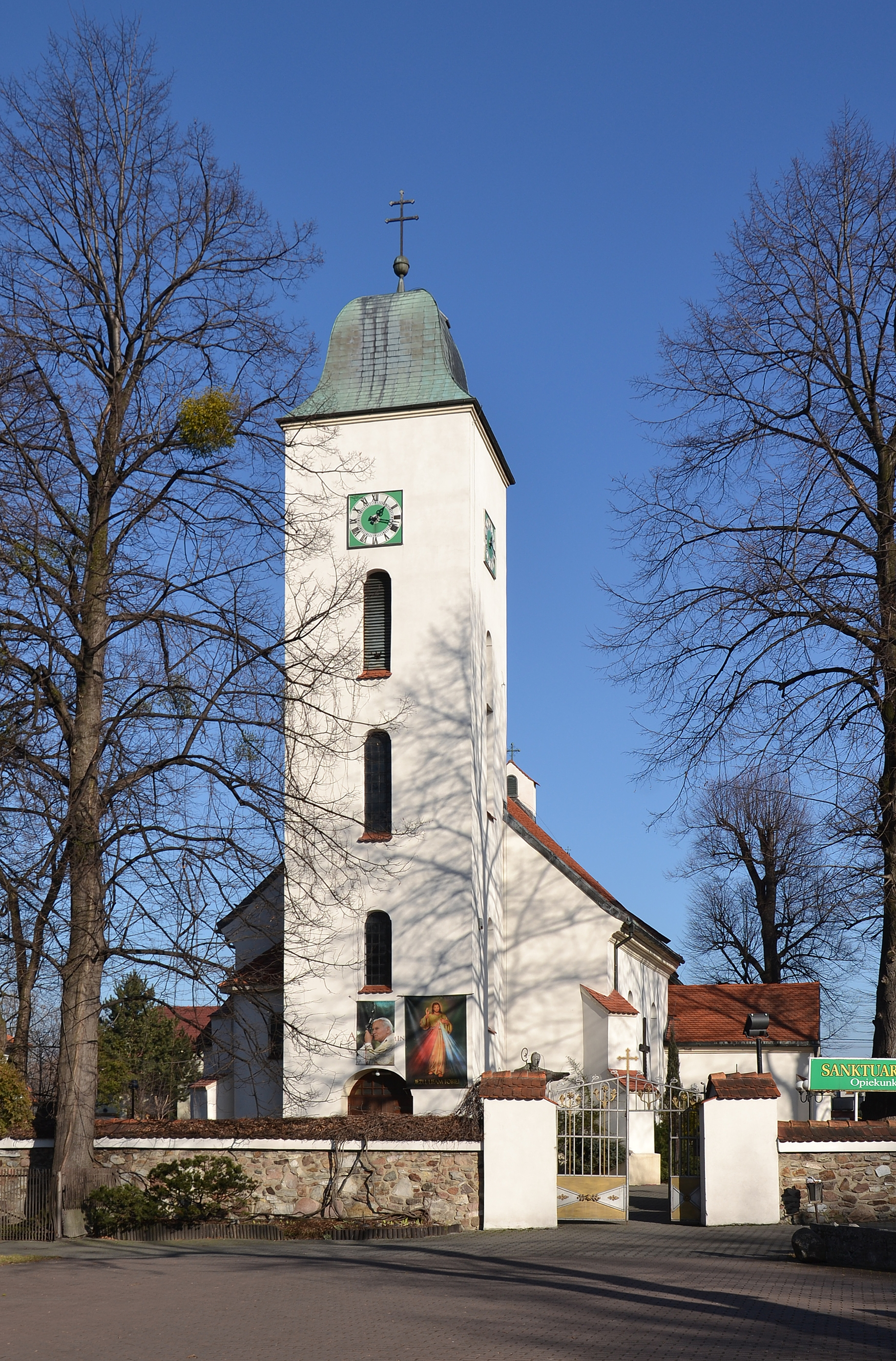
- Saint Nicholas church
- Interactive map of Bojków
- Coordinates: 50°11′18″N 18°48′07″E
- Country: Poland
- Voivodeship: Silesian
- County/City: Mikołów
- Time zone: UTC+1 (CET)
  - Summer (DST): UTC+2 (CEST)
- Area code: (+48) 032

Bujaków (German: Bujakow) is a sołectwo in the west of Mikołów, Silesian Voivodeship, southern Poland. It was an independent village but was administratively merged into Mikołów in 1995.

== History ==
The village was first mentioned in a Latin document of Diocese of Wrocław called Liber fundationis episcopatus Vratislaviensis from around 1305 as item in Buyacow expleta libertate erunt XXX mansi solventes fertones, de quibus prepositura Oppoliensis obtinet tres, alios dominus episcopus habet.. It meant that the village's law was changed then and so was temporarily freed from taxes, thus it had to be older.

It became a seat of a Catholic parish in Bytom deanery of Diocese of Kraków first mentioned in 1337 as Babencow in an incomplete register of Peter's Pence payment composed by Galhard de Carceribus. It was later also mentioned in the register of Peter's Pence payment from 1447 among the parishes of Gliwice deanery as Boycaw.

After World War I in the Upper Silesia plebiscite 565 out of 775 voters in Bujaków (additionally 51 out of 72 in Bujaków manor goods) voted in favour of joining Poland, against 208 (plus 21 in manor goods) opting for staying in Germany.
