= Joseph Abraham Steblicki =

German convert to Judaism

Joseph Abraham Steblicki (c. 1726 – 16 May 1807) was a teacher and treasurer who became notable for converting to Judaism.

Steblicki was born in Nikolai, Upper Silesia which was at the time part of Germany in about 1726. He was the son of a butcher, and was raised a Catholic. He received an education in Jesuit colleges, and became a teacher and later the city treasurer in his native town. He eventually became a member of the city council. Retiring from active life in 1780, he occupied himself with religious studies, and then began his conversion to Judaism. He began to observe the Sabbath and the dietary laws; then he circumcised himself; and on the Day of Atonement in 1785 he attended services in the Jewish synagogue dressed in a white attire, like other worshipers.

When the authorities were informed of Steblicki's conversion, proceedings against him were immediately instituted which, according to the law of Leopold I, of 1709, then still in force, should have led to a sentence of death. But the king, Frederick II, ordered the proceedings to be suspended (on 12 December), and left to the revenue authorities the questions as to whether Steblicki, as a Jew without right of residence ("unvergleiteter Jude"), should be tolerated, and whether he should be required to pay the special Jewish taxes. On 28 July 1786 the authorities decided that he should not be charged, on the ground that he must be mentally unbalanced.

Steblicki lived more than twenty years after his conversion in harmony with his wife and his son, and was highly respected by the small Jewish community of Nikolai. He died there on 16 May 1807. His life was made the subject of legendary exaggerations in David Samosez's Ger Zedek (Breslau, 1816) and in M. A. Hertzberg's Der Neuc Jude (Gleiwitz, 1845).
