= Eugeniusz Wycisło =

Polish politician

member of Sejm 2005-2007
- In office 25 September 2005 – 2007

Personal details
- Born: 4 January 1948 (age 78) Mikołów, Silesian-Dabrowa Voivodeship, Republic of Poland
- Party: Civic Platform

Eugeniusz Józef Wycisło (born 4 January 1948 in Mikołów) is a Polish politician. He was elected to the Sejm on 25 September 2005, getting 6,836 votes in 30 Rybnik district as a candidate from the Civic Platform list.

He was also a member of Sejm 2001-2005.

== See also ==
- Members of Polish Sejm 2005-2007
