= Mikołów =

Town in Mikołów County, Poland

Mikołów Mikołōw
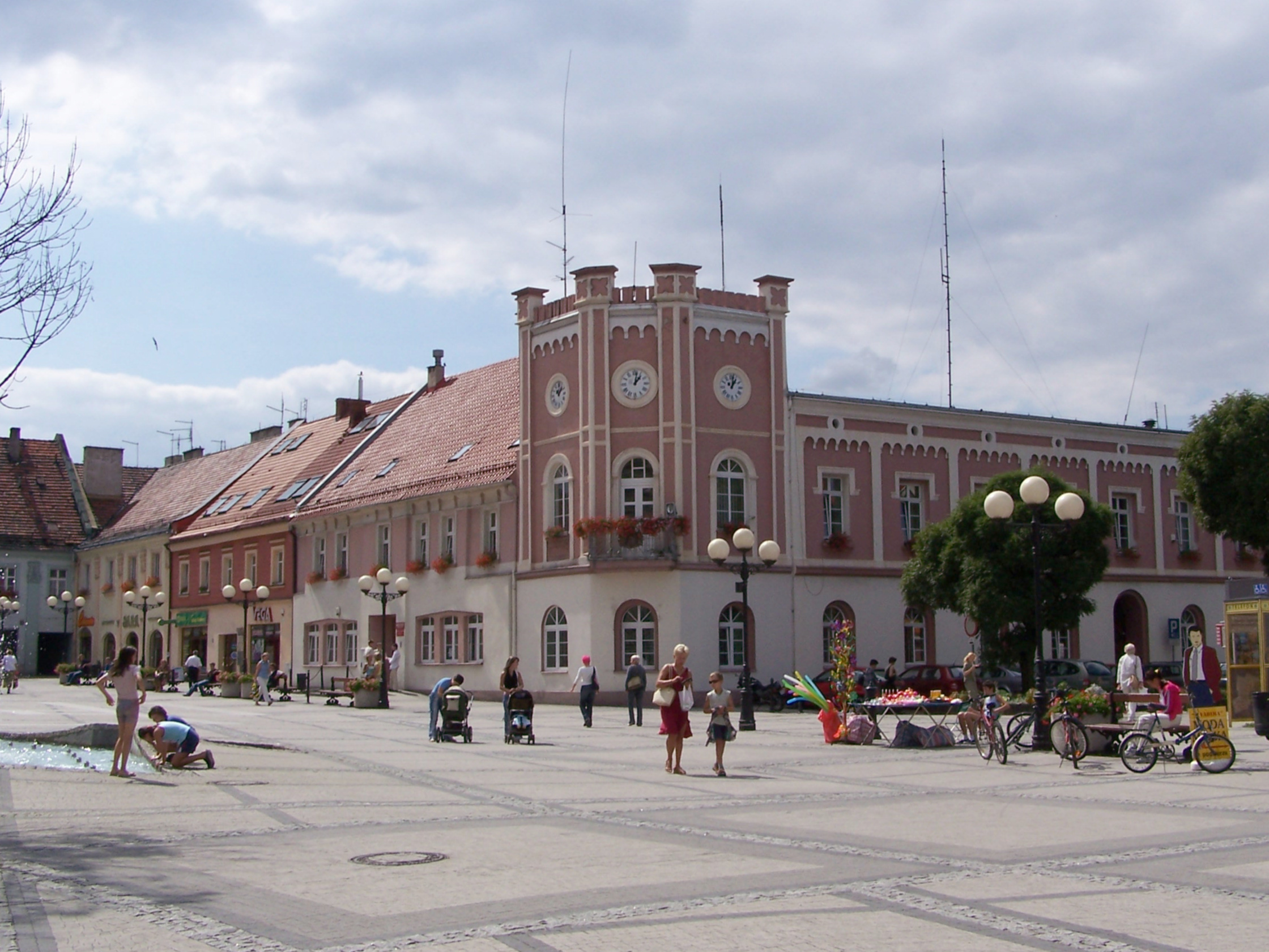
- Market Square and Town Hall

- Coat of arms

- Location within Poland Location within Silesian Voivodeship
- Coordinates: 50°10′N 18°54′E
- Country: Poland
- Voivodeship: Silesian
- County: Mikołów
- Gmina: Mikołów (urban gmina)
- First mentioned: 1222
- Town rights: 1547

Government
  - Mayor: Stanisław Piechula

Area
  - City: 79.2 km^{2} (30.6 sq mi)

Population (2019-06-30)
  - City: 40,898
  - Density: 516/km^{2} (1,340/sq mi)
  - Urban: 2,746,000
  - Metro: 5,294,000
- Time zone: UTC+1 (CET)
  - Summer (DST): UTC+2 (CEST)
- Postal code: 43–190 to 43–197
- Area code: +48 32
- Car plates: SMI
- Climate: Dfb
- Primary airport: Katowice Airport
- Website: https://mikolow.eu/

Mikołów [miˈkɔwuf] (German: Nikolai, Silesian: Mikołōw) is a city in Silesia, in southern Poland, near the city of Katowice. Outer town of the Metropolis GZM, a metropolis with a population of over 2 million, and is within a greater Katowice-Ostrava metropolitan area populated by about 5,294,000 people. The population of the town is 40,898 (2019). Located in the Silesian Highlands, on the Jamna stream, a tributary of the Kłodnica River and indirectly the Oder.

It is situated in the Silesian Voivodeship since its formation in 1999, previously in Katowice Voivodeship, and before then, of the Silesian Voivodeship.

== History ==
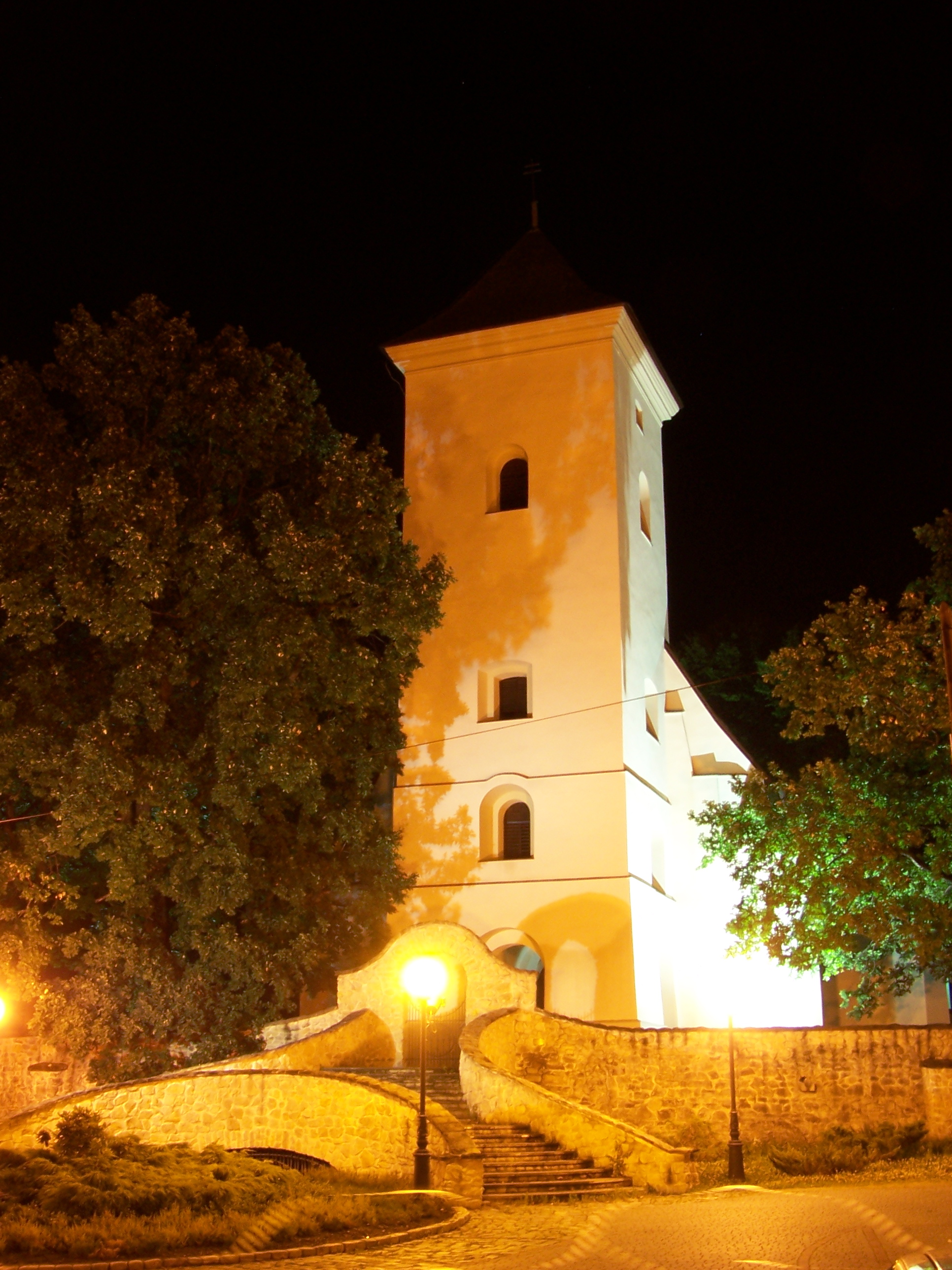
Gothic Our Lady of the Snow church at night

With a written mention from 1222, Mikołów is one of the oldest towns in Upper Silesia. This was a document sent by duke Casimir I of Opole (the son of Mieszko II the Fat) to the bishop of Wrocław, Wawrzyniec. In the document was written the name of Andrew (Latin: comes Andreas, castellanus de Miculow), the castellan of Miculow, showing that Mikołów was already an administrative center. The town's name comes from the name Mikołaj ("Nicholas"), and is of Polish origin. As a result of the fragmentation of the medieval Kingdom of Poland, Mikołów was part of the Duchy of Opole and Racibórz, still ruled by the Piast dynasty until 1532. During the Ostsiedlung, Mikołów significantly grew in population and expanded its infrastructure.

Mikołów became the center of local trading, located on crossroads of trading roads. The Black Death killed 33% of the town's inhabitants in 1349–50. In the period 1433–1443, there were several earthquakes in the area. In 1547, Mikołów gained city status. In 1580 the first Protestant pastor came to the town, however, in 1630, the local parish returned to the Catholic Church and its parish priest became Tomasz Aleksander Czarniecki. In 1645 and 1687, few fires burnt tenements near the market place and in connection with that Mikołów achieved the right to expose four fairs a year. In the second half of the 18th century peasants few times opposed the ruler and paying high serfdomes. Additionally, in between 1713 and 1715, the city survived a famine bringing epidemics. Following the mid-18th-century Silesian Wars, the town was annexed by the Kingdom of Prussia. In 1760, the name "Mikołów" was used first time in the original form. On 20 May 1794, a huge fire disaster burnt whole houses around the market square, including the town hall and all historical documents stored inside.

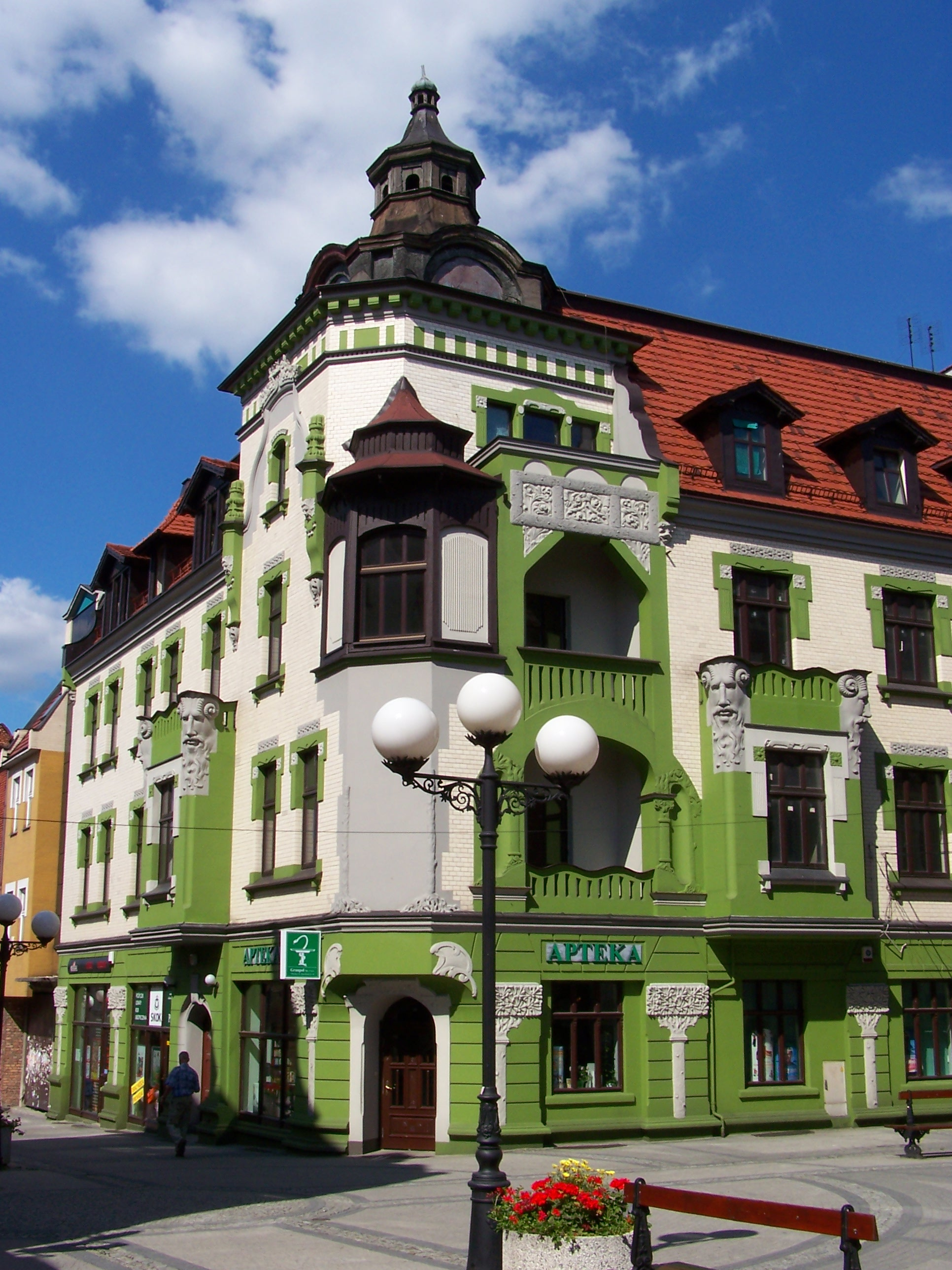
Art Nouveau architecture in Mikołów

In the 19th century, the town became a center of Polish printing in Upper Silesia. In 1845, Tomasz Nowacki founded a Polish printing house. Poles smuggled large amounts of gunpowder through the town to the Russian Partition of Poland during the January Uprising in 1863. In 1871, the town became part of the German Empire, where it was officially known under the Germanized name Nikolai. The town's predominantly Polish population referred to the town as both Mikułów and Mikołów. In the 1870s, Polish activist and writer Karol Miarka established another Polish printing house, and moved the editorial office of the Katolik and Poradnik Gospodarczy newspapers from Chorzów to Mikołów. Due to harassment by German authorities, Miarka handed over the printing house to his son, and left for Cieszyn, whereas the editorial office of Katolik was moved back to Chorzów in 1881. In 1908, the still-existing Polish choir Harmonia was founded.

After World War I, in 1918, Poland regained independence, and shortly after the Polish Silesian Uprisings were fought and a plebiscite was held, in which the slight majority of the town opted with 55.2% in favor of remaining within Germany, while the overwhelming majority in the present-day districts (then surrounding villages) of Borowa Wieś, Kamionka, Mokre, Śmiłowice, Bujaków and Paniowy opted to reintegrate with Poland, with the result ranging from 72.2% voting for Poland in Bujaków to 94.4% in Kamionka. The town was eventually reintegrated with Poland in 1922, where it officially became Mikołów. Within interwar Poland, the town was electrified, new schools were opened, a new post office, fire brigade and stadium were built, and a Polish library was founded.

=== World War II ===
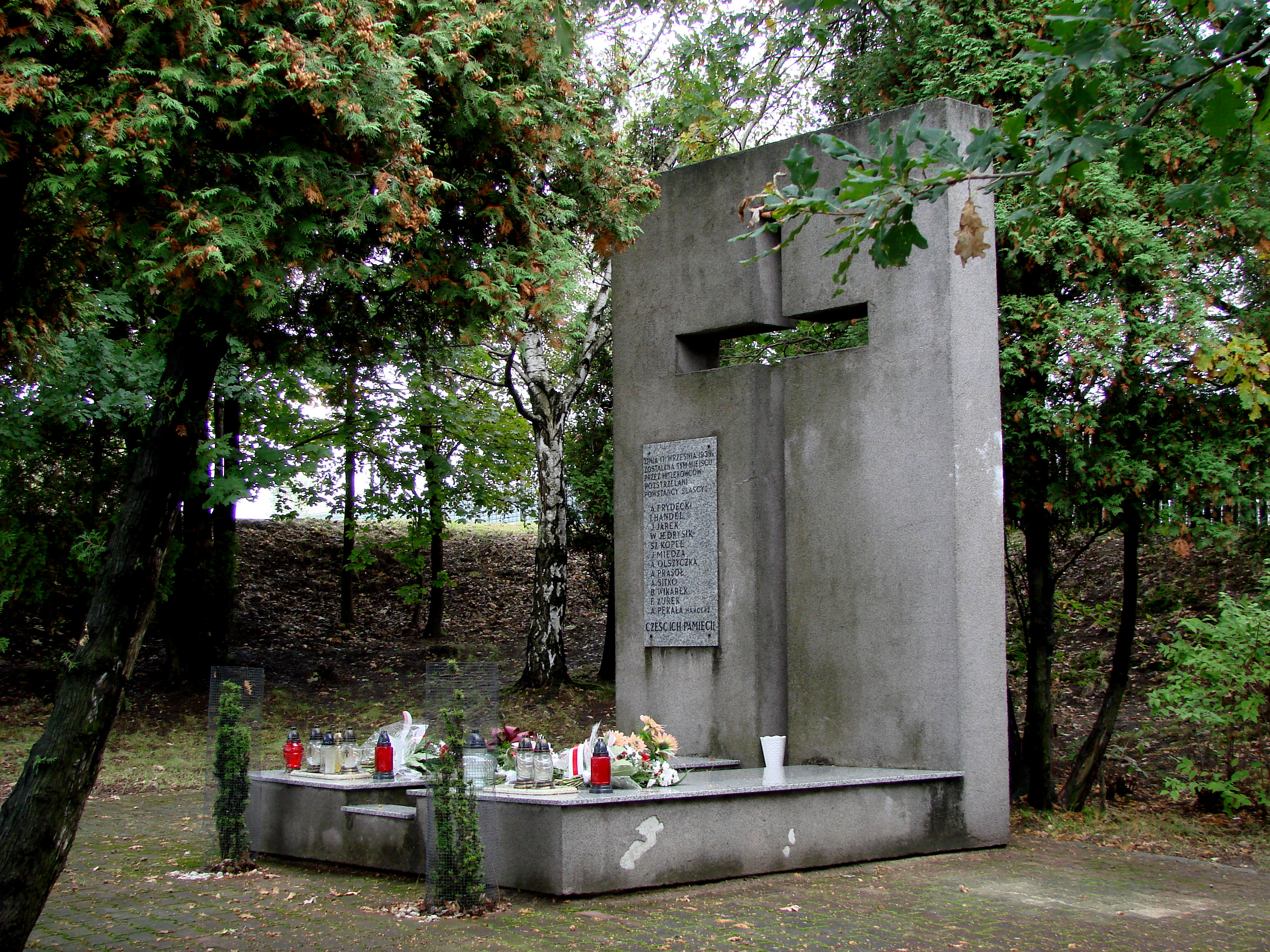
Memorial at the site of a German massacre of 12 Poles, carried out on September 17, 1939

During the German invasion of Poland, which started World War II, the town was captured by German troops on September 3, 1939. Mikołów was defended against the Germans jointly by the Polish Army and civilians. Due to Polish fortifications, the remainings of some pre-war Polish bunkers can be seen even today.

During the subsequent German occupation, the Polish population was subjected to mass arrests, murder, deportations to concentration camps, expulsions and forced conscriptions to the Wehrmacht. Already in early September 1939, the Germans carried out mass arrests and executions of former Polish insurgents of the Silesian Uprisings and local Polish activists. Among the victims of massacres carried out on 5, 7 and 17 September 1939 were Polish workers, miners, craftsmen, a farmer, a court employee, a policeman, a merchant, and a local official. The Germans also carried out manhunts of Polish insurgents who were hiding in the forest between Mikołów and Tychy, and destroyed the book collection of the pre-war Polish library.

Nevertheless, local Poles quickly organized an underground resistance movement, and Poles from Mikołów also fought in the Polish Armed Forces in the West along the Western Allies. 16 Polish policemen from Mikołów were murdered by the Soviets in Mednoye during the large Katyn massacre in 1940. In 1943, the Germans carried out expulsions of Poles. In January 1945, the Germans murdered 14 members of the Polish resistance movement and 60 prisoners of the Auschwitz concentration camp in Mikołów during a death march, while in the present-day districts of Borowa Wieś and Mokre, they murdered 31 and 13 prisoners respectively.

In 1945–1950, many citizens were either deported to the Soviet Union as forced labour or expelled in accordance with the Potsdam Agreement. The town itself was restored to Poland. In the years after the war, as the surviving pre-war Polish population, was joined by Poles from East and Central Poland.

=== Jewish history ===
The first Jews appeared in Mikołów in 1674, establishing an inn. The synagogue in Mikołów was established in 1816. There was about 800 Jews in the town in the second half of the 19th century. Since then the number of Jewish inhabitants little by little has been lowering down to the level of 243 before the Second World War. Just before the liberation by Soviets in January 1945, prisoners from Auschwitz had marched through Mikołów to Germany to work in labour camps. They were totally exhausted and weak, most of them were at the death's door. In Mikołów over 60 people died or were murdered and then buried in the Jewish cemetery. Among the prisoners were also some Catholics. In 1972 the communist authority ordered the miners from the coalmine Bolesław Śmiały to detonate the Synagogue.

The Jewish cemetery in Mikołów was established at the end of the 19th century, but the oldest tomb dates back to 1726. Only 100 of 265 tombs are preserved. In the front of the cemetery is the memorial, dedicated to the victims of January 1945. On the memorial there is written: "In this place rest in peace 14 people shot up on 16 January 1945 by Schutzpolizei officers, and 50 prisoners from the concentration camp in Auschwitz, murdered on 19 January 1945 during evacuation of the camp by Germans. Glory to them"

In Mikołów there was also located another-older Jewish cemetery (1682) but during the Second World War it was completely ruined.

== Districts ==
Apart from the town proper Mikołów has one distinct district (Kamionka) and 5 sołectwos:

- Borowa Wieś
- Bujaków
- Mokre
- Paniowy
- Śmiłowice

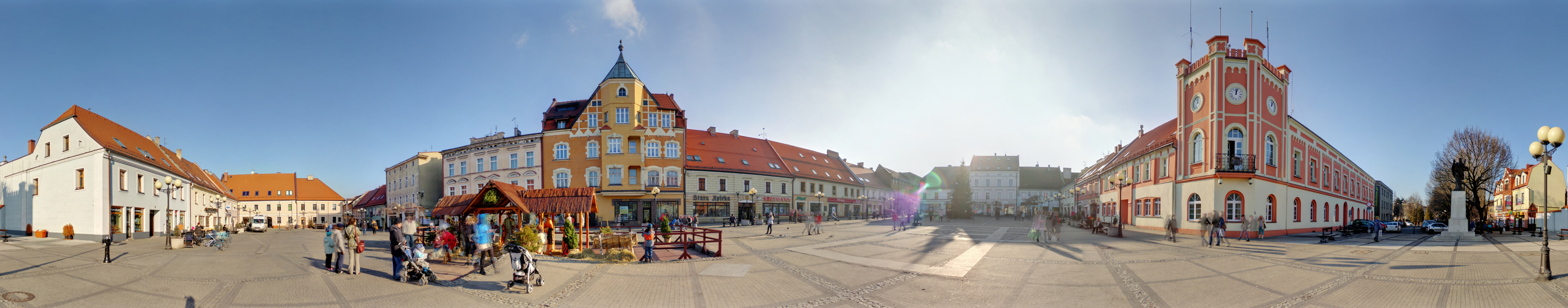
Panoramic view of the Rynek (Market Square) in Mikołów

== Notable people ==
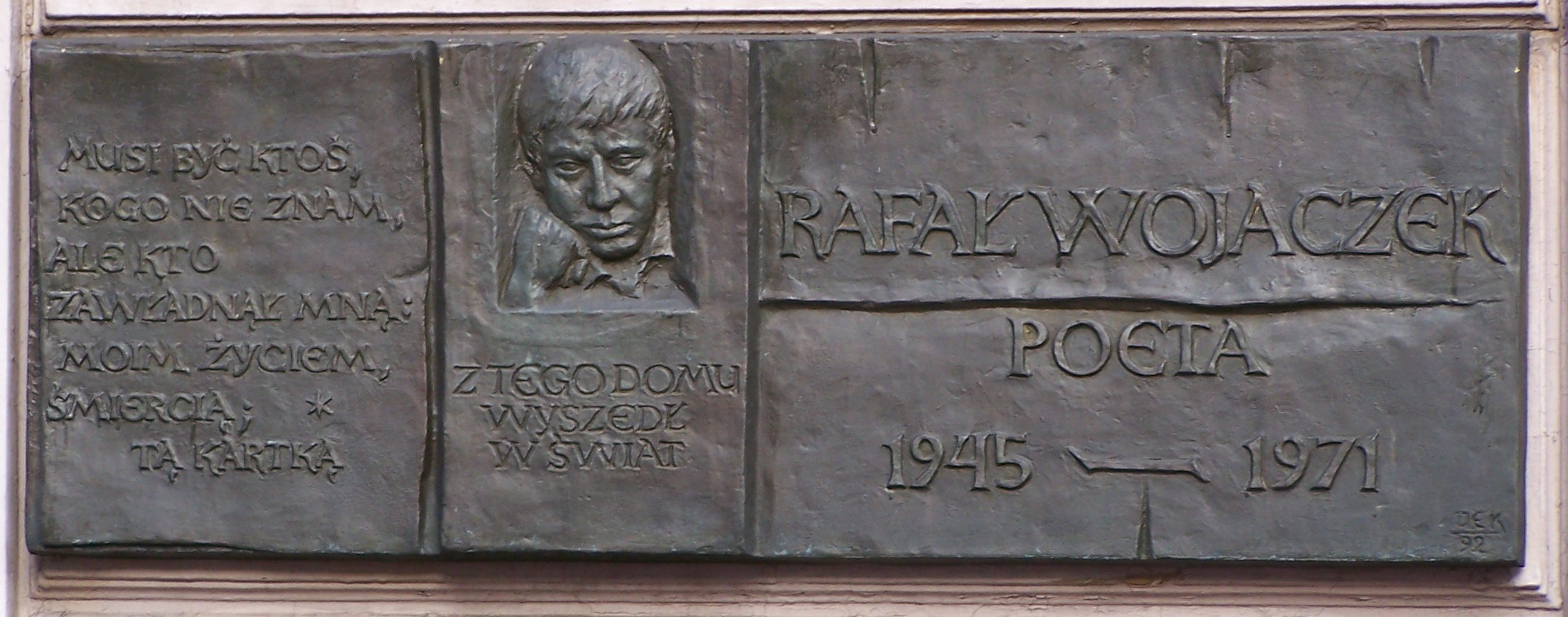
Memorial plaque at the birthplace and childhood home of Polish poet Rafał Wojaczek

- Joseph Abraham Steblicki (c. 1726–1807), teacher and treasurer
- Ignaz Wechselmann (1828–1903), Hungarian architect and philanthropist
- Georg Zeumer (1890–1917), World War I fighter pilot
- Rafał Wojaczek (1945–1971), poet
- Eugeniusz Wycisło (born 1948), politician
- Izabela Kloc (born 1963), politician
- Roksana Jonek (born 1978), Miss Polonia 1997
- Anna Dereszowska (born 1981), actress and singer
- Daniel Macioł (born 1999), professional pool player

== Twin towns – sister cities ==
Mikołów is twinned with:

- Beuningen, Netherlands
- Ilava, Slovakia
- Klimkovice, Czech Republic
- Sainte-Geneviève-des-Bois, France
