= Paniowy =

- Sołectwo of Mikołów
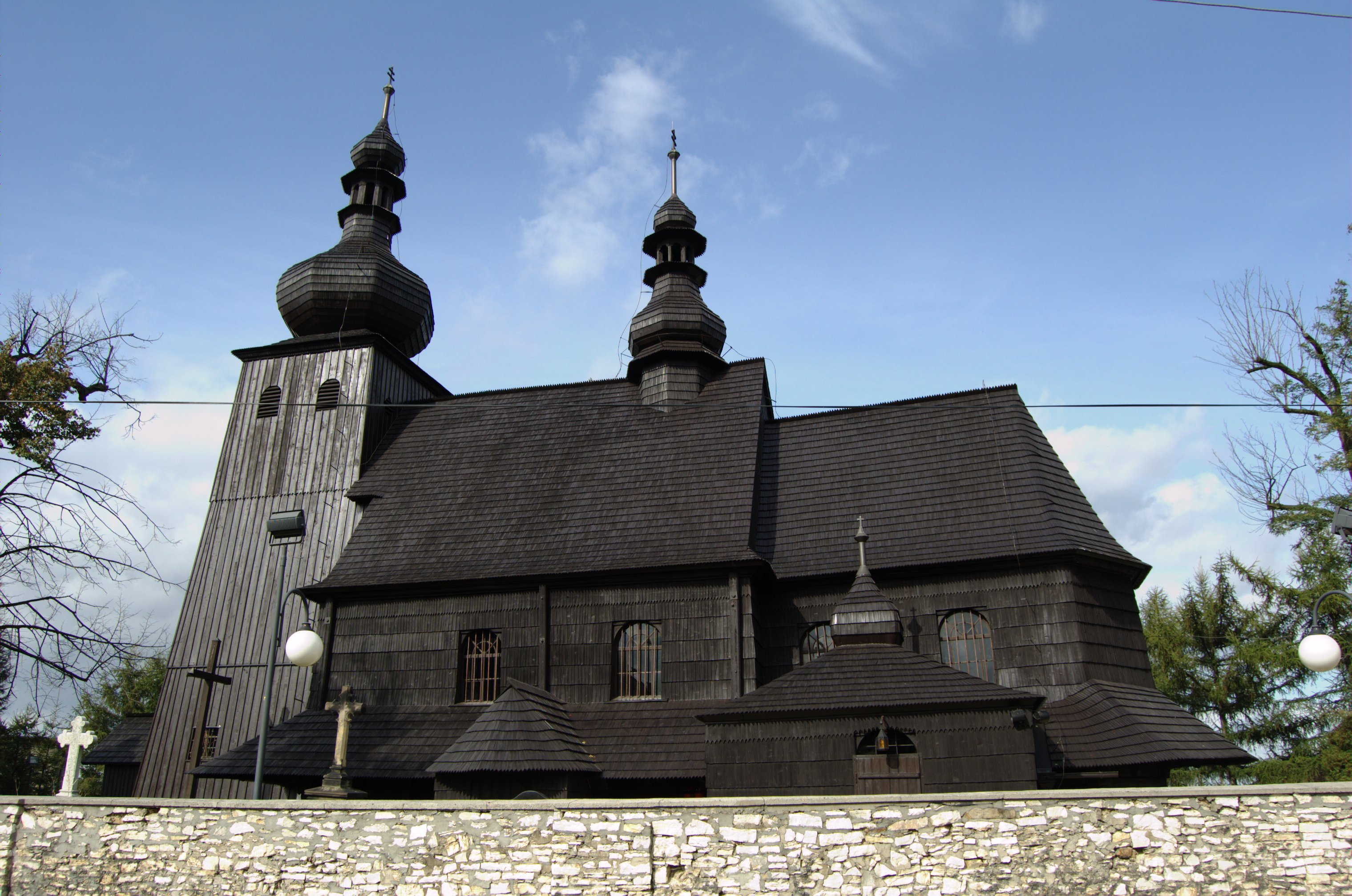
- Saints Peter and Paul church
- Interactive map of Paniowy
- Coordinates: 50°12′29″N 18°49′19″E
- Country: Poland
- Voivodeship: Silesian
- County/City: Mikołów
- Time zone: UTC+1 (CET)
  - Summer (DST): UTC+2 (CEST)
- Area code: (+48) 032

Paniowy (German: Groß Paniow) is a sołectwo in the west of Mikołów, Silesian Voivodeship, southern Poland. It was an independent village but as a part of gmina Mokre was administratively merged into Mikołów in 1975.

== History ==
The village was first mentioned in 1282 as belonging to a knight Piotr (Peter). In 1325 a church was mentioned. A third and currently standing wooden Saints Peter and Paul church was built after 1757.

After World War I in the Upper Silesia plebiscite 349 out of 403 voters in Paniowy (additionally 76 out of 101 in Paniowy manor goods) voted in favour of joining Poland, against 54 (plus 25 in Paniowy manor goods) opting for staying in Germany.
