= Voce Segreto =

Polish mixed youth choir

Voce Segreto is a mixed youth choir operating at the Miejski Ośrodek Kultury (MOK) cultural centre in Żory, directed by Andrzej Marciniec. The choir is mainly made up of young people from schools in Żory.

== History ==
Voce Segreto was founded in September 1991 (initially as Ciężka Batuta). Its founder is Andrzej Marciniec, a graduate of the University of Silesia in Cieszyn, who has been a conductor and a teacher of music education in the Karol Miarka Liceum since the beginning of the choir's existence. During the first 14 years the choir members' voice technique and emission was supervised by Henryk Paus. Nowadays this function is performed by Elżbieta Żydek. The members of the choir are students of Karol Miarka Liceum and other municipal middle and high schools.

== Repertoire ==
The range of works performed by the choir is wide. The repertoire that the choir sings at a concert depends on the liturgical period or season, among other things. Voce Segreto performs various types of songs – from traditional carols, spirituals, gospel songs, through pop music pieces to folk music. In the past, the choir has also performed with an orchestra from the music school in Opole, performing works by Bach and Mozart. A large part of the works are prepared by the conductor, "Czarna Alibaba", "Majowa Ballada", "Wieża Babel" or "Przybieżeli do Betlejem". The choir sometimes performs together with the shanty band "Ryczące Dwudziestki". The choir's conductor, Marciniec, is a member of Ryczące Dwudziestki.

== Achievements ==
The choir has collected many honors and awards, some of which are:

- 2015 Second place in the Provincial Song Review "God is Born"
- 2014 First place in the Regional Review of Songs "God is Born"
- 2014 SILVER MEDAL in 42nd International Song Festival in Olomouc
- 2014 Bronze Kamerton in the 34th National Competition for Children and Youth Choirs in Bydgoszcz
- 2011 Festa Musicale in Bratislava
- 2009 First place at the V Voivodship Festival of School Choirs in Częstochowa
- 2009 Gold Kamerton and 6 other awards at the XXIX National Competition for A Capella Choirs in Bydgoszcz
- 2009 First place at the 18th Christmas Carol Evenings in Tychy
- 2008 Third place at the International Choir Festival "Mundus Cantat Sopot
- 2008 Phoenix Sariensis Award of the Mayor of Żory for the choir's lifetime achievements and making Żory famous in the international arena
- 2007 Grand Prix at the III Voivodship Festival of School Choirs in Częstochowa
- 2006 Another gold medal at the XXXIV International Song Festival "Mundi Cantat" in Olomouc
- 2005 Silver Kamerton and Award of the Minister of Culture at the XXIV National A Capella Choir Competition in Bydgoszcz
- 2004 Gold Medal at the XXXII International Song Festival "Mundi Cantat" in Olomouc
- 2003 Grand Prix at the II Voivodship Song Festival in Siemianowice Śląskie
- 2002 Gold Medal at the XXX International Song Festival "Mundi Cantat" in Olomouc
- 2002 Third place at the National Festival of Carols and Pastorals in Będzin
- 2001 Silver medal at the XXIX MFP
- 1997 Grand Prix at the IXth Festival of School Youth Culture in Katowice

== Tournée ==
The choir has also made a series of tours abroad, including:

- Hungary 1997, 2004
- Czech Republic 1998, 2001, 2004, 2011, 2012
- Belgium 1999
- France 1999, 2010
- Germany 2000
- Austria 2000, 2001, 2004
- Italy 2001
- Vatican 2001
- Spain 2006
- Wales 2007
- Slovakia 2011

== Discography ==
- "Wyprawa na..." (2002); a full spectrum of the choir's output
- "Kolędy" (2002); the album contains a collection of the "warmest" Polish carols
- "Tchnienie gór" (2003); the album is dedicated to Pope John Paul II (and was given to him on 16 October 2003)
