= Borowa Wieś =

- Sołectwo of Mikołów
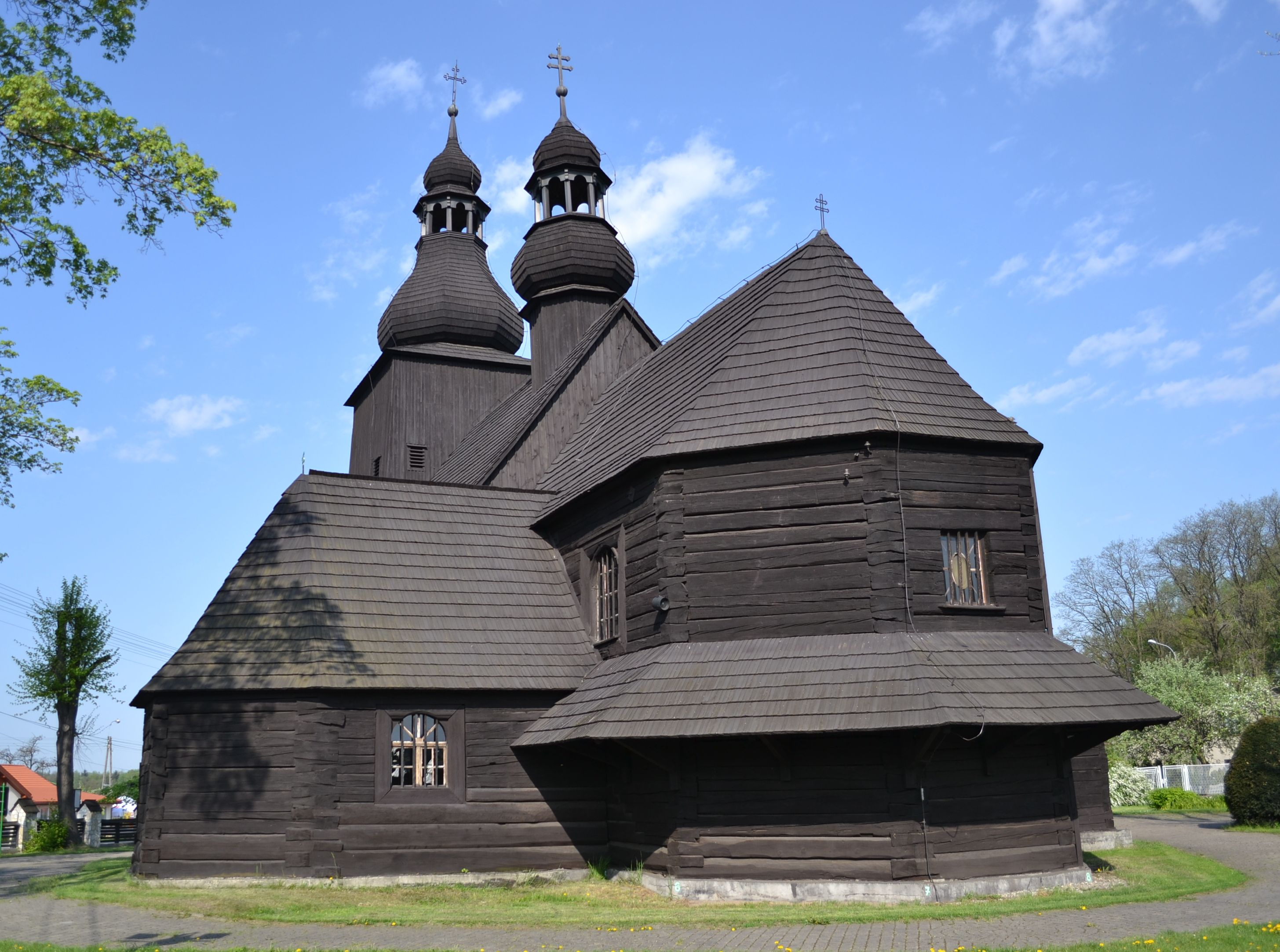
- Saint Nicholas church

- Location in Poland
- Coordinates: 50°13′35″N 18°49′01″E
- Country: Poland
- Voivodeship: Silesian
- County/City: Mikołów
- Time zone: UTC+1 (CET)
  - Summer (DST): UTC+2 (CEST)
- Area code: (+48) 032
- Vehicle registration: SMI

Borowa Wieś (German: Neudorf) is a sołectwo in the north west of Mikołów, Silesian Voivodeship, southern Poland. It was an independent village but as a part of gmina Mokre was administratively merged into Mikołów in 1975.

The biggest landmark of Borowa Wieś is wooden Saint Nicholas church, originally built in 1640 in Przyszowice, moved to Borowa Wieś in years 1937–1939.

== History ==
The village was established in the 16th century by Karol von Promnitz, the owner of the Duchy of Pless. Initially the village was known as Neudorf (Polish: Nowa Wieś, literally New Village), whereas the current name, derived from the Polish word bór (a conifer forest), appeared in the 18th century. In the 18th century it was annexed by the Kingdom of Prussia, and from 1871 it was part of Germany.

After World War I, in 1918 Poland regained independence, and in the Upper Silesia plebiscite 381 out of 421 voters in Borowa Wieś voted in favour of joining Poland, against 41 opting for staying in Germany.

During World War II Borowa Wieś was occupied by Germany. In the final stages of the war, in January 1945, the Germans murdered 31 prisoners of the Auschwitz concentration camp in Borowa Wieś during a death march.

== Notable people ==
- pl:Robert Gajda (1890–1952), Polish priest and composer
- Joachim Maj (1932–2019), Polish speedway rider
