= Art Nouveau in Poland =

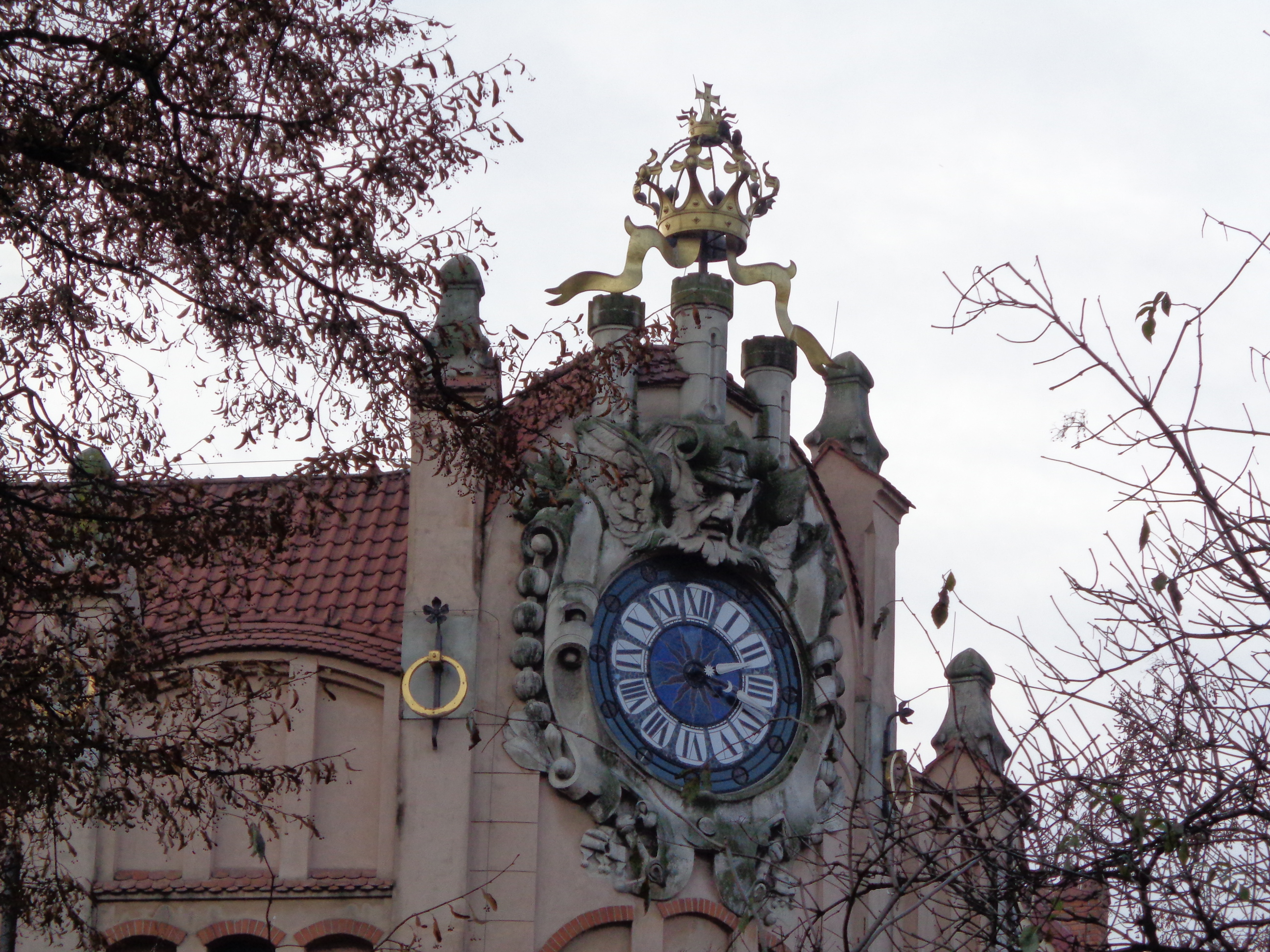
Clock on the Academy of Commerce in Kraków, Poland

Art Nouveau in Poland (Polish: Secesja) was a part of a press in the international Art Nouveau style, although often absorbed into a local Polish architectural and artistic trends. Creating political and social issues nationwide, debating over what Polish culture should be. Being the most popular in the years 1890–1910.

== Background ==
Behind the Polish Art Nouveau style, lies terminology, as the Polish phrase Secesja or what we know as Secession was used when referring to this Art Nouveau style in academic areas. But for those who study English, Secesja means to pose a variety of problems. It comes from an Australian Root even though Poland was influenced more by the French and British style, oddly. And Americans view “Secession” as something that is very misleading, so to speak because of its relevance with the Civil War, allowing the American audience to hold a political lead in the terminology. Another term of Poland that associates itself with the Art Nouveau style is the phrase “Mloda Polska” meaning Young Poland. But lying ahead this term also involves itself with several issues as well. It doesn't only refer to Polish modern art, or the Nouveau style, but also to the neo-Romantic vein of art. Since Polish Art Nouveau had its biggest influence from British and French art, Art Nouveau has an underestimated, “meaning in English of the Polish art movement.”

Artists that came before 1890 anticipated the coming of modern art, bringing us our true origin of the Art Nouveau style, beginning in London in March 1893. When the journal of Audrey Beardsley had been located. Finding the illustration made by Beardsley, J’ai baisé ta bouche Iokanaan that was made for Oscar Wilde’s play Salome. Pronouncing this piece the “first mature image in the Art Nouveau style. It was Beardley’s curvy lines, and organic structure of the painting's flower, that allowed this piece to be a statement for the Art Nouveau style. Following, still in 1893, was when the Art Nouveau made its entrance for the first time in architecture and interior design in Brussels, but it wasn't until 1895 when a new gallery was opened in Paris, “L’Art Nouveau,” by a French businessman named Siegfried Bing. This was the moment that brought the movement its name of being international. This was the moment that made Paris an active place for the Art Nouveau. Late 1895 Art Nouveau spread throughout Europe, and in the 1900’s the style had reached to be international.

The Polish Art Nouveau style was centred in Kraków, once Poland's royal capital city. Stanisław Wyspiański was the chief Art Nouveau artist in Poland; his paintings, theatrical designs, stained glass windows and building interiors are widely admired and celebrated in the National Museum in Kraków. The Zakopane Style architecture is part of Polish Art Nouveau style. Also, Vienna Secession buildings can be found in various Polish cities, e.g. in Bielsko-Biała (Saint Nicholas' Cathedral and house at 51 Stojałowskiego Street by Leopold Bauer as well as house at 1 Barlickiego Street by Max Fabiani).

Main centers of Art Nouveau buildings in Poland are Kraków, Łódź, Wrocław, Poznań and Bydgoszcz. Warsaw was once a thriving centre of Art Nouveau architecture, however, only a few individual buildings survive; the city was razed during World War II. Subsequently, more destruction was inflicted by the communist authorities between 1947 and 1989 on the grounds that the buildings were perceived as decadent and bourgeois.

Notable Polish Art Nouveau architects include Franciszek Mączyński, Tadeusz Stryjeński, Ludwik Wojtyczko, Sławomir Odrzywolski, Beniamin Torbe, Romuald Miller, Wiktor Miarczyński.

=== What is “Polish”? ===
Even with the political situations that changed Polish Art in the 18th and 19th century, there are a variety of things that also made Polish Art Nouveau a very difficult topic to study. Given there was no Polish state throughout the nineteenth century, these Polish artists were classified based on where they lived. Making it difficult to know the exact relevance of Polish Culture on Polish Art Nouveau, questioning if Polish Art actually originated from Poland. During the 19th century, “Polish” was considered unpredictable and ever changing. Since Poland had been portioned during this time, some people couldn’t be classified as a “Pole” due to their living area. This partitioned place of Poland was not only home to Polish people but to many diverse groups as well; this includes Ukrainians, Lithuanians, and Jews. When these partitions vanished those living there were no longer classified “Poles.” The Poles who knew of these restrictions ended up emigrating to other places to avoid being prosecuted, but still classified themselves as Polish. Stating this, it defines how when putting a label on a Pole during this period of partitioning made it very difficult.

Not being able to accurately identify a Pole is one of many reasons why studying Polish art has been less studied. Even on this specific topic, few sources are available. One source on Polish Art Nouveau is Secesja by Miczysław Wallis. Saying that for one to be able to study Polish Art, they must take a different approach than the usual research, applying historical, political, and artistic insights on their studies.

=== Inspiration of Art Nouveau ===
Artists adopted many of the floral and organic motifs of Art Nouveau into the Young Poland style. Young Poland, however, was also inclusive of other artistic styles and encompassed a broader approach to art, literature, and lifestyle.

Art Nouveau is based upon nature; plants, animals, florals, and landscapes being shown and explored all across the world. The form of a woman was also highly used in the use of International Style, all in sake for a “more organic,” presentation of art. Many European artists are influenced by Japanese and Islamic art, as they demonstrate the use of an organic form of the international style.

== Gallery ==
Houses

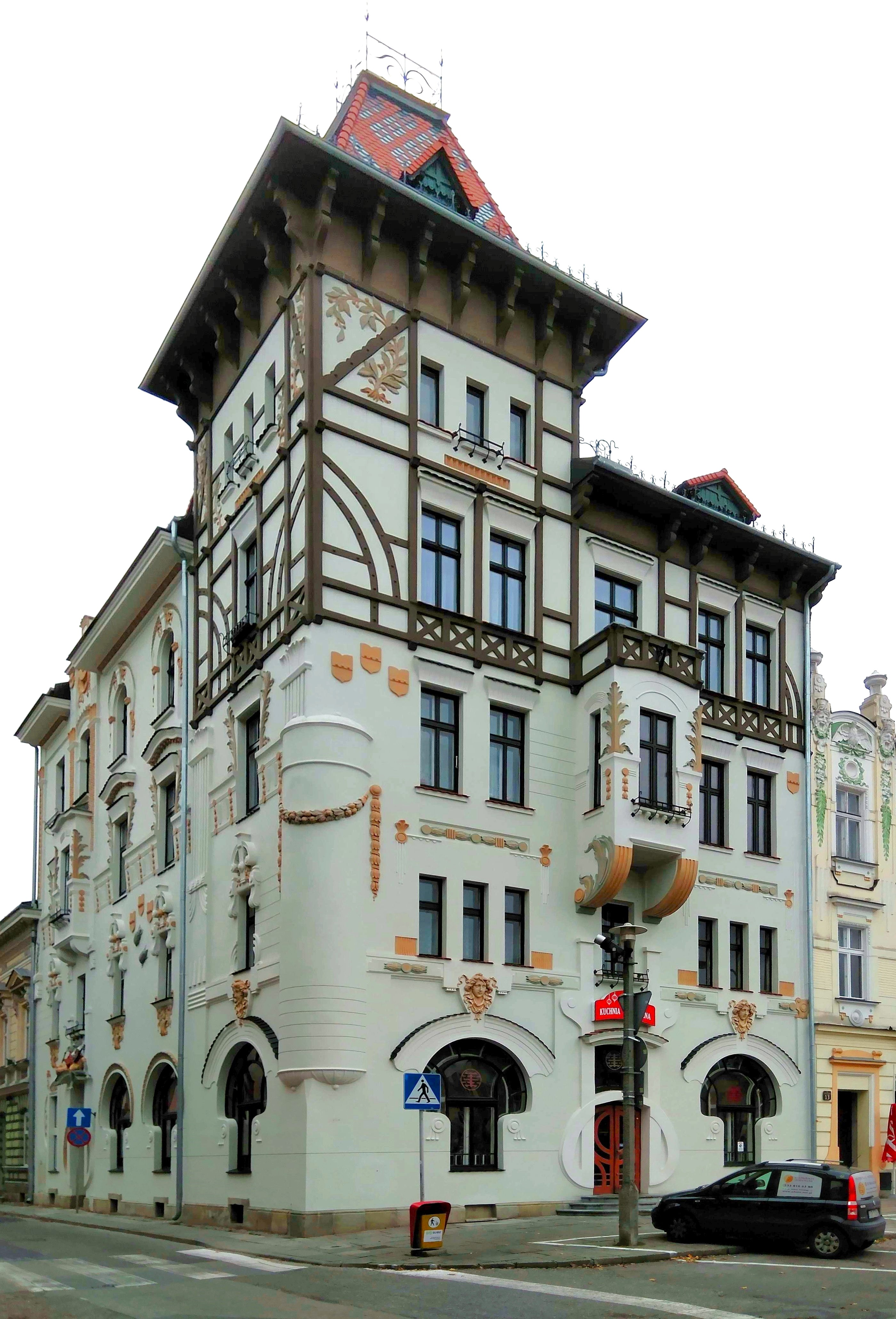
Frog House, Bielsko-Biała

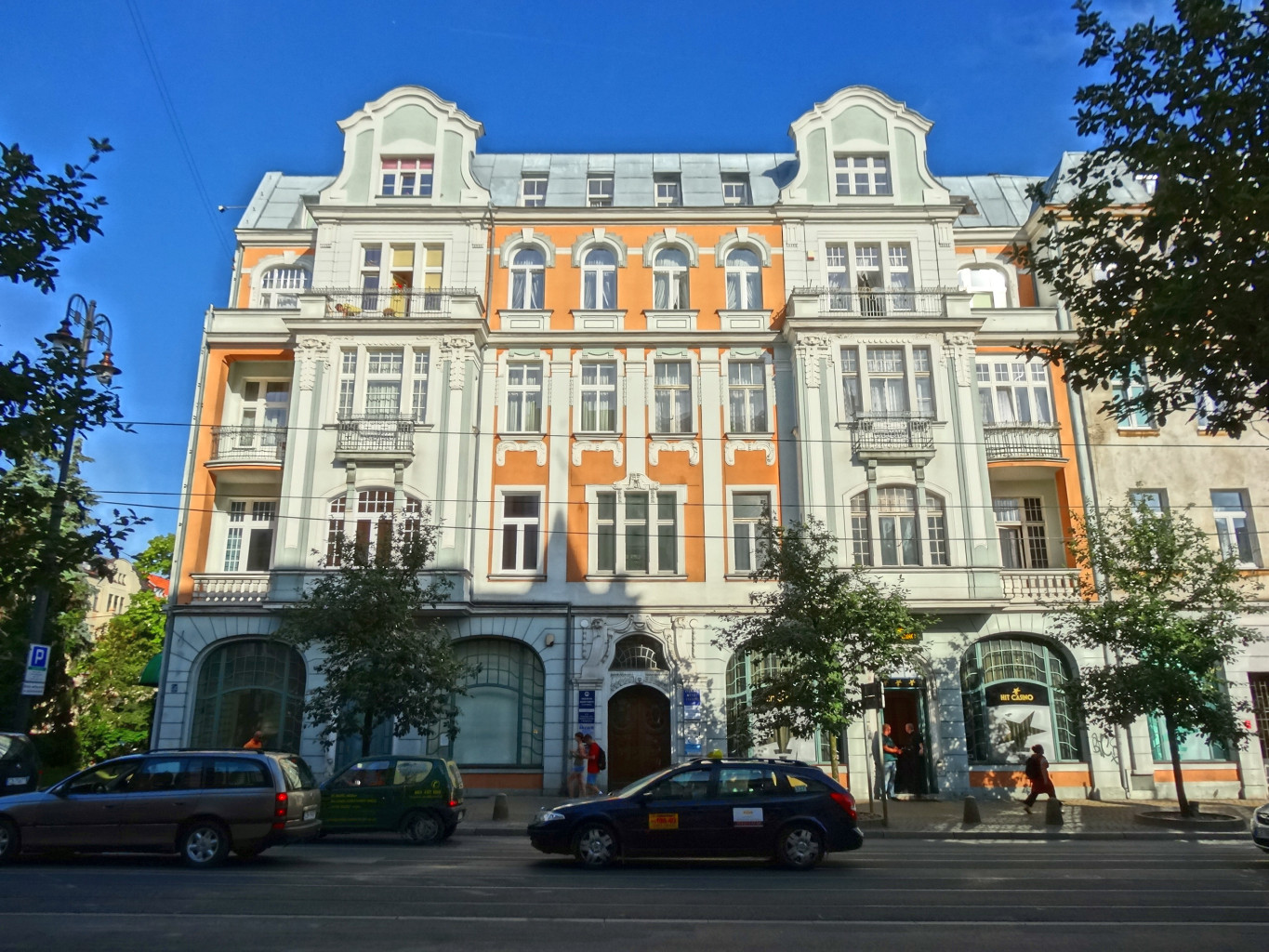
Eduard Schulz Tenement, Bydgoszcz

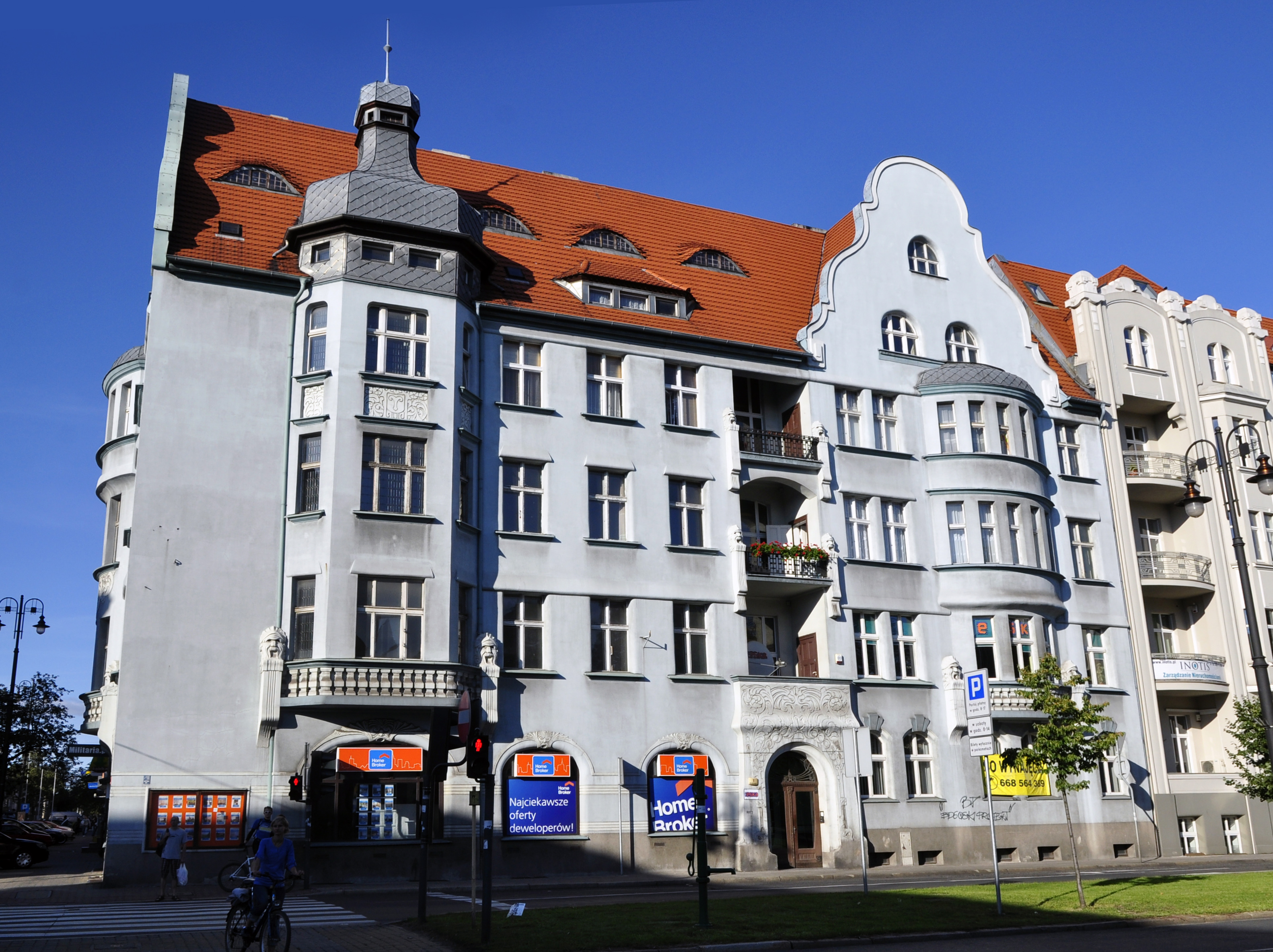
Rudolf Kern Tenement, Bydgoszcz

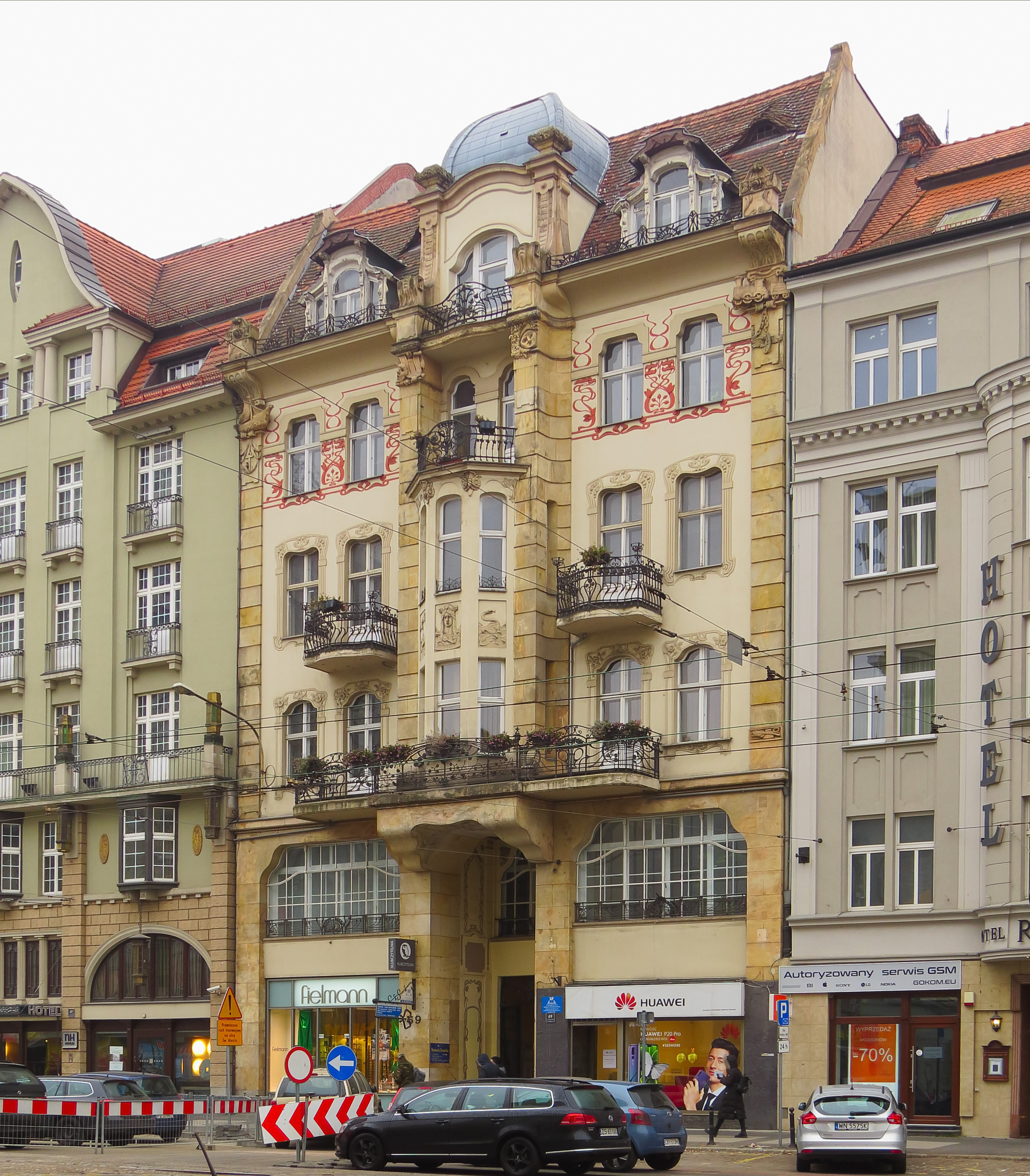
Haase and Wagner Tenement House, Poznań

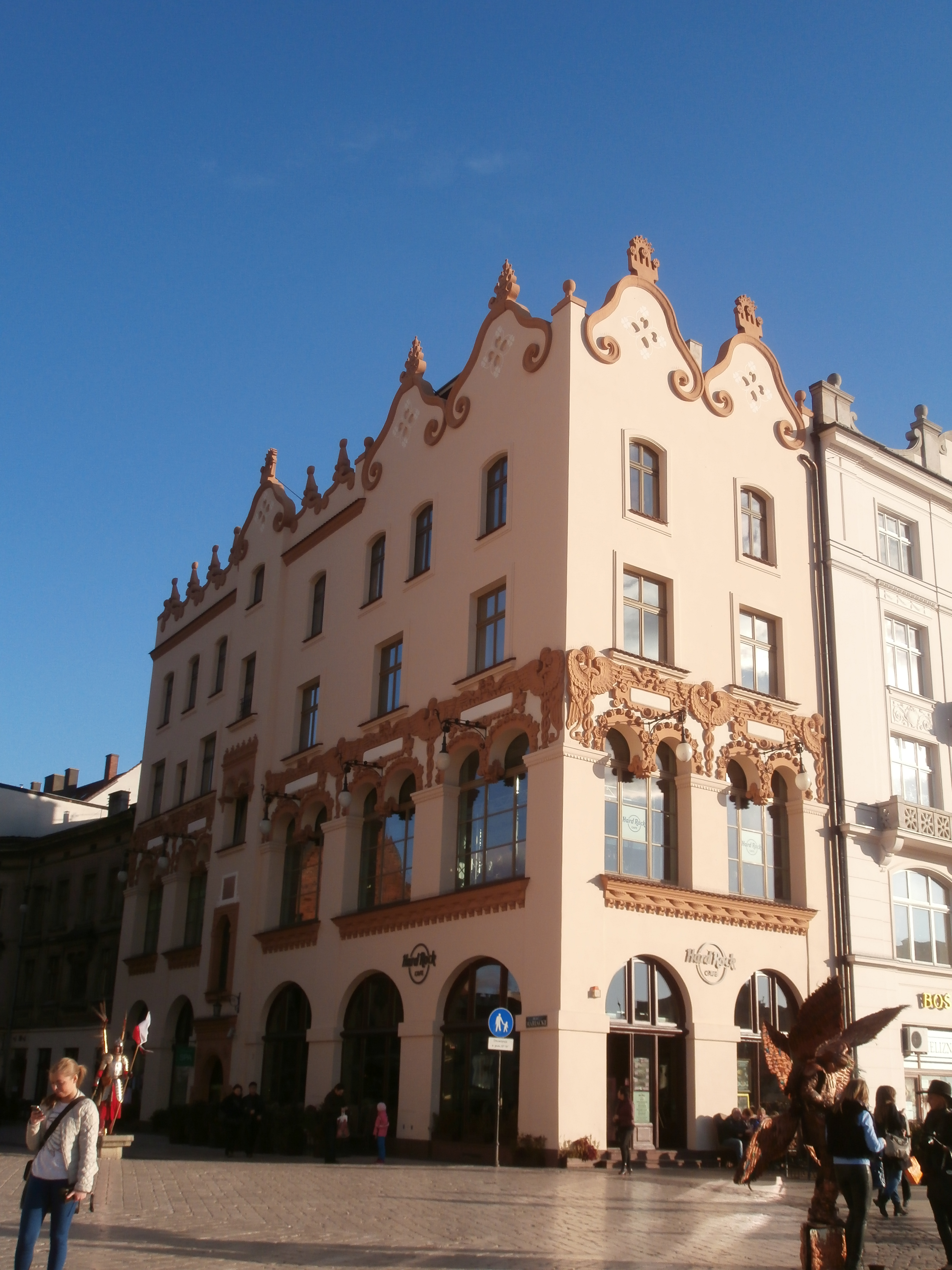
Czynciel House, Kraków

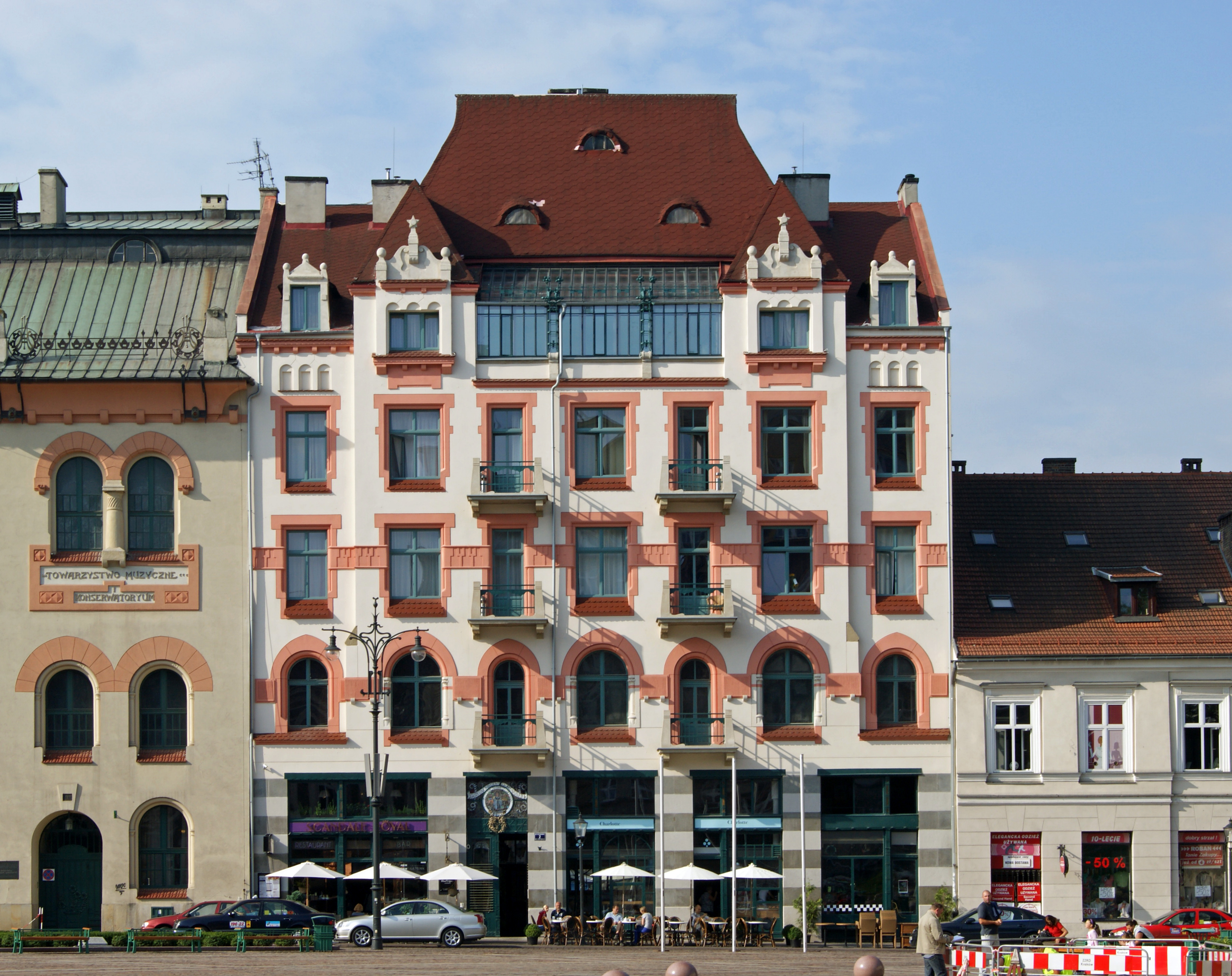
Wolny Tenement, Kraków

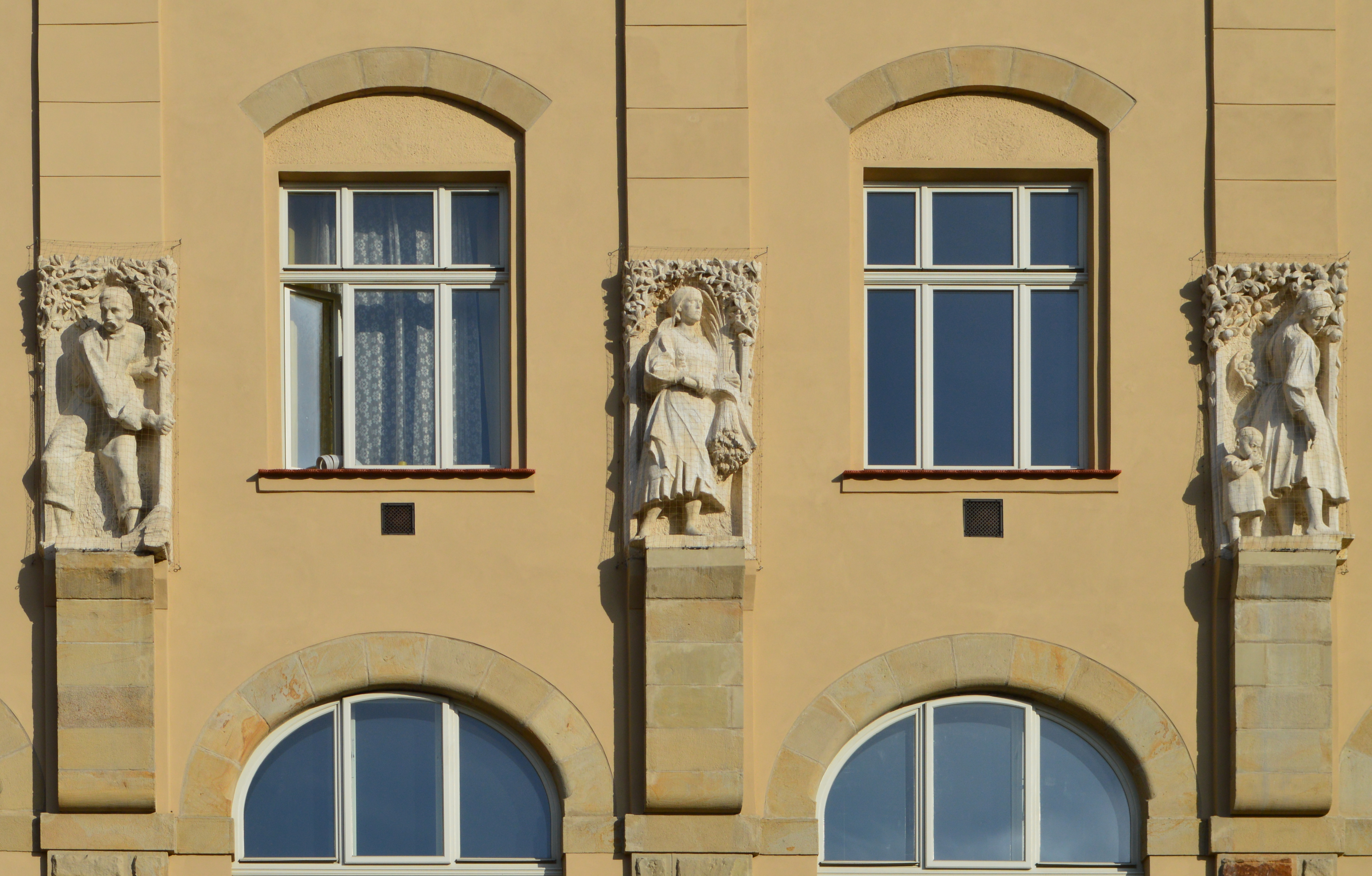
Facade of the Agricultural Society Building, Kraków

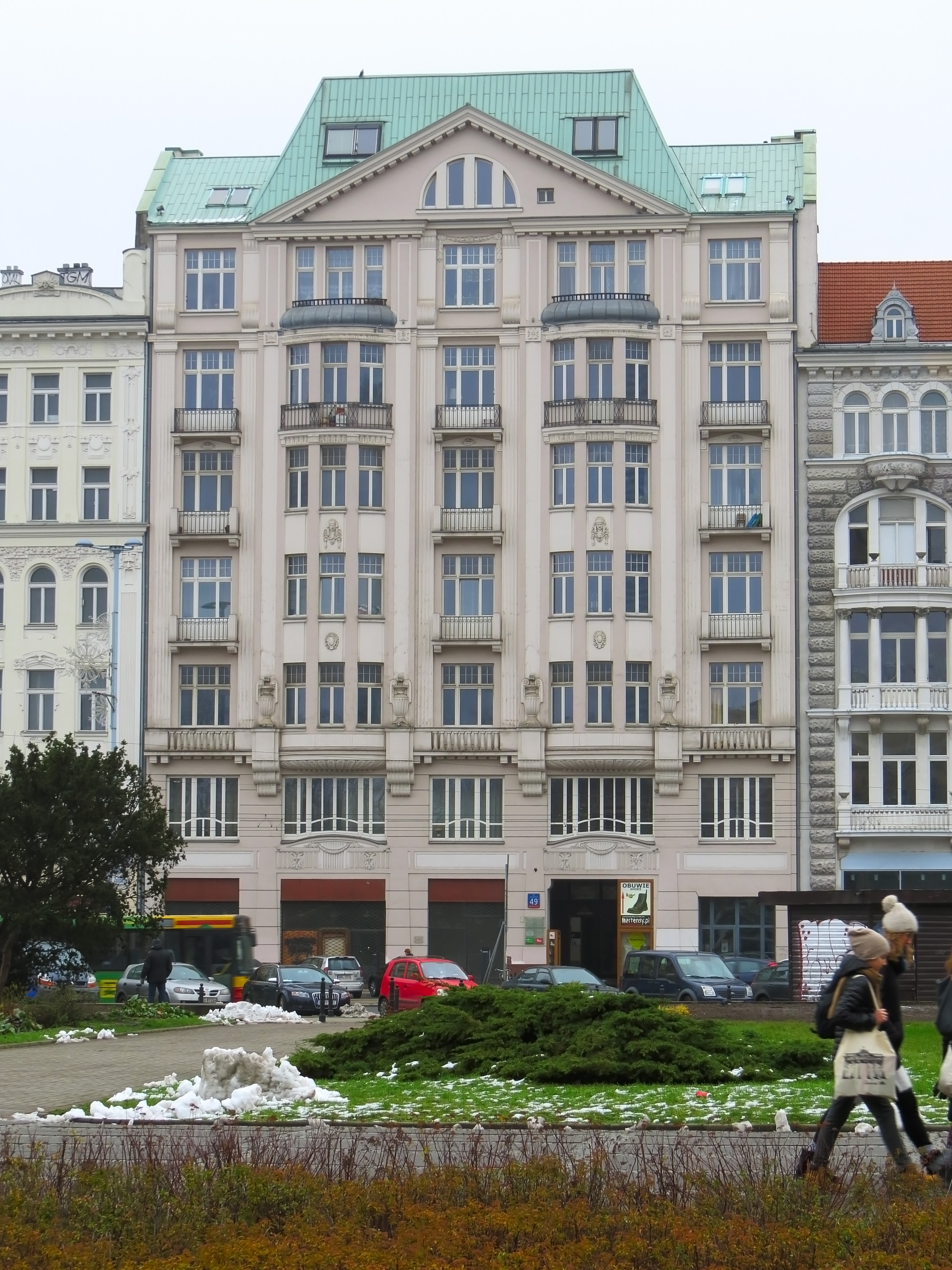
Jerusalem Avenue, Warsaw

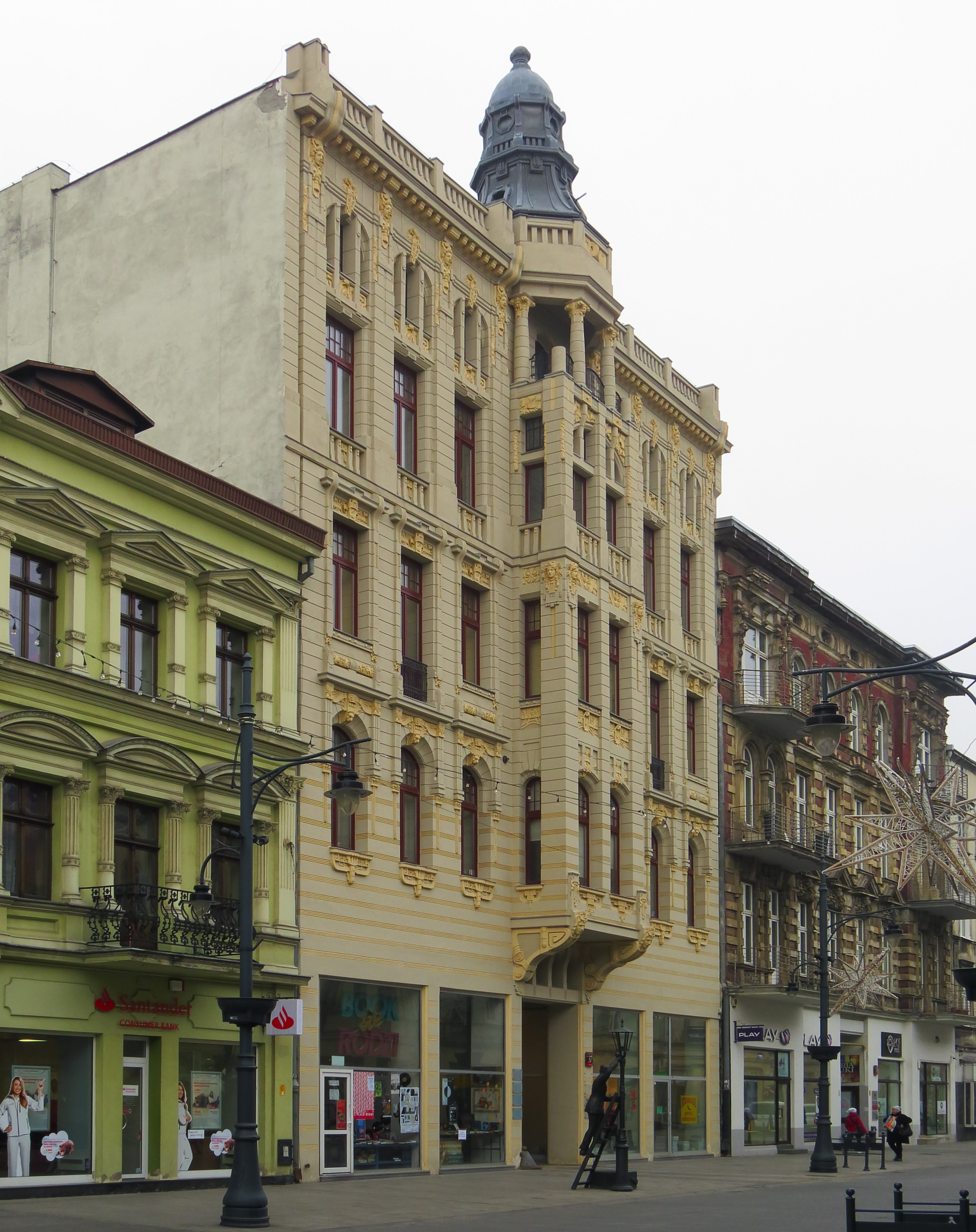
Piotrkowska 37, Łódź

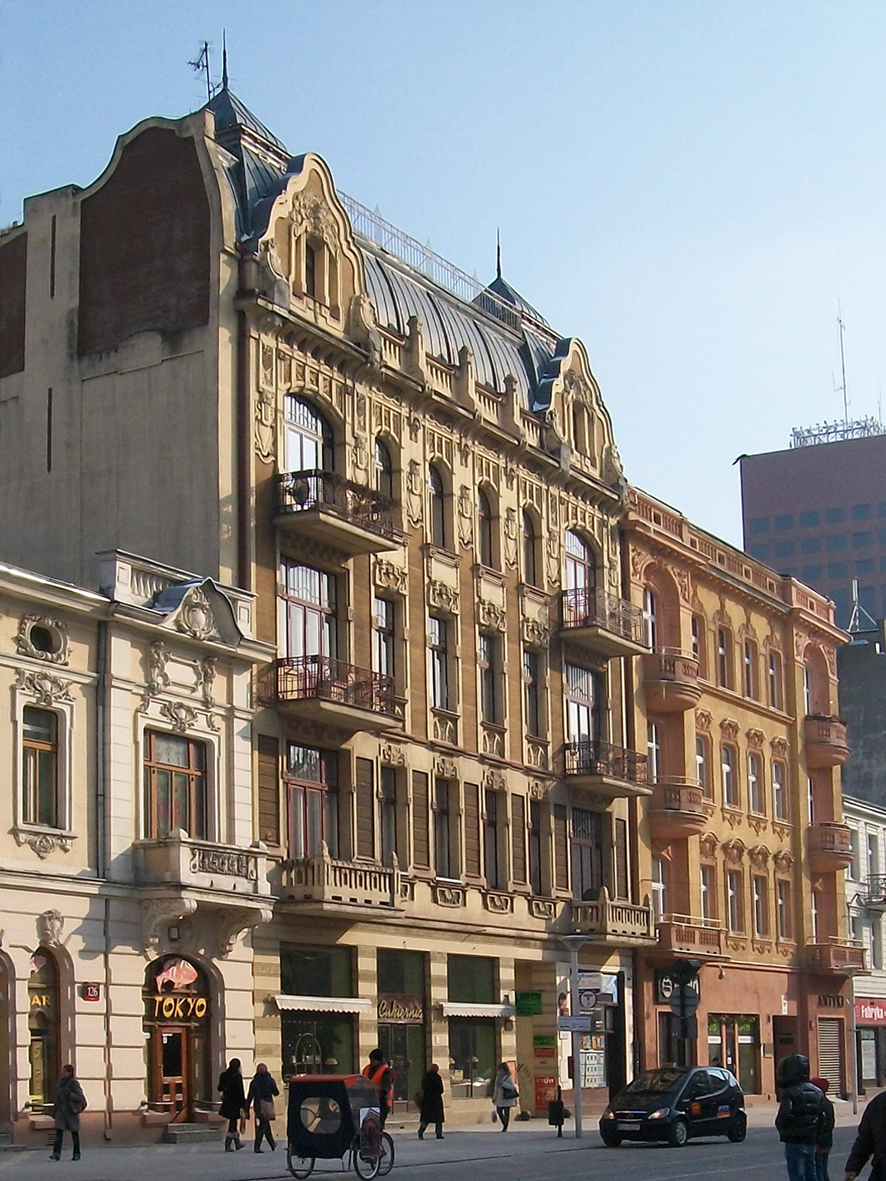
Schycht House, Łódź

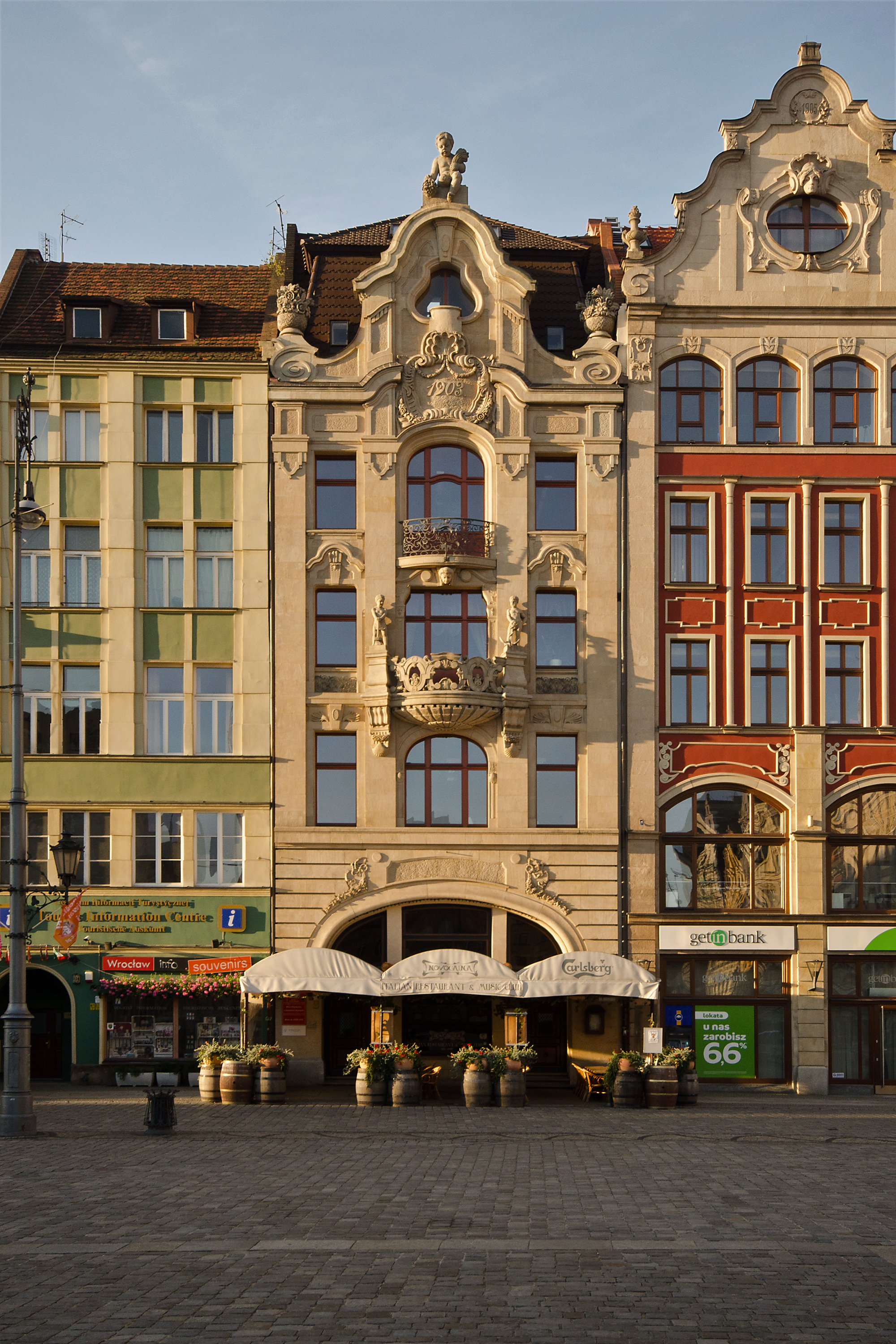
Market Square, Wrocław

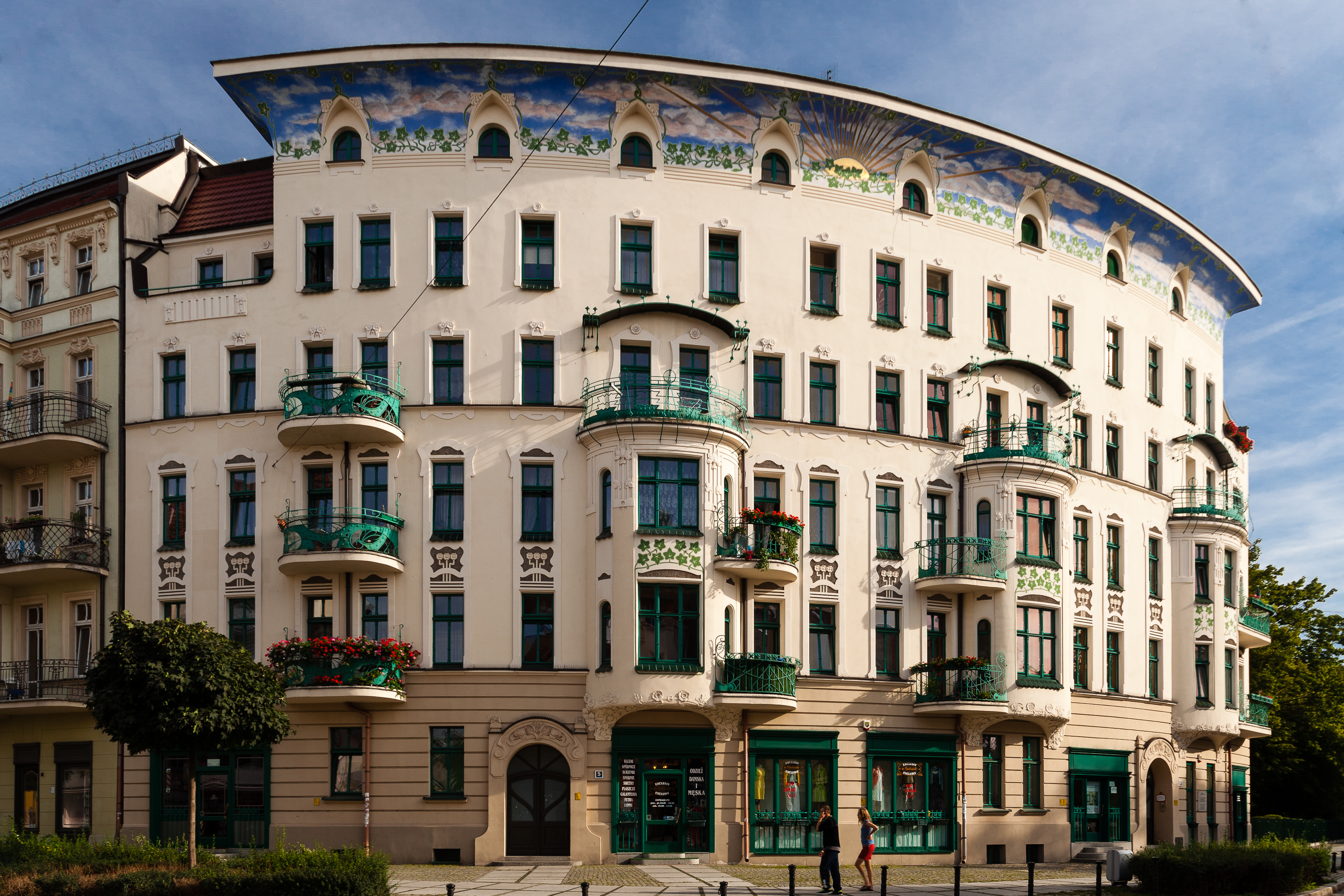
Wrocław
