= Karol Miarka Liceum (Żory, Poland) =

I Liceum Ogólnokształcące z Oddziałami Dwujęzycznymi im. Karola Miarki w Żorach

Location
- Powstańców 6, 44-240, Żory; Poland
- Coordinates: 50.0491°N 18.6961°E

Information
- Patron saint: Karol Miarka
- Established: 1912
- Headmaster: Mariusz Gębarowski
- Executive headteacher: Joanna Lojza; Barbara Perenc; Radosław Roś
- Website: www.1lo.zory.pl

Karol Miarka Liceum (in Polish: I Liceum Ogólnokształcące im. Karola Miarki) is the oldest lyceum school in Żory.

== History ==
On 5 February 1912 a German men's school, Städtische höhere Knabenschulle, was established by a letter from the Opole Regency L II f XXIII/XII No. 147. On 16 April 1912 Mayor Reiche opened the school. In 1912/13, 26 students were enrolled, and Mr. Janocha became head of the school.

In 1922, the high school came under the administration of the Polish authorities and became a progymnasium (six-year gymnasium).

The first years were difficult for the school, due to attempts to fully Polonize education and staffing problems. The result was the establishment of the Karol Miarka Municipal Male Gymnasium, which took place by decision of the Pedagogical Council on 21 September 1927.

In 1932 the first Polish matura exam was held, with six students taking it.

As a result of hostilities during World War II, the school building was 60 percent destroyed. The first classes were held as early as April 1945, and the school took the name of the Karol Miarka State Gymnasium and Coeducational Lyceum.

In 1961, the high school was enriched with audiovisual equipment, in the form of a television and a tape recorder. In the 1970s and 1980s, renovations continued, including the creation of a dining hall and a kitchen, and classrooms were equipped with new teaching aids.

In 1985 a young teacher and graduate of the school, M.Sc. Adam Herman, contributed to the establishment of a microcomputer club with a ZX Spectrum computer received from Warsaw.

In 1993 the school was named the Karol Miarka Lyceum, and in 1999 the Żory High School Complex with the Karol Miarka Lyceum No. 1, the Lyceum for Adults, and the Gymnasium No. 1.

After the liquidation of the gymnasium in 2019, the school became School Complex No. 1 in Żory, which includes: Karol Miarka Lyceum with bilingual branches in Żory and Technikum No. 4.

In 2020, a sports hall was opened at the school.

== Famous graduates ==
Among the alumni of the school are:

- Krystian Lupa - theater director, set designer, graphic designer, author of theater scripts, adaptor, translator, teacher at the Krakow PWST, author of musical arrangements of his own productions;
- Sonia Bohosiewicz - actress;
- Zygmunt Łukaszczyk - politician, mayor of Żory in 1990–1998, since 2007 Voivode of Silesia;
- Bartosz Gajda - cabaret artist, one of the creators of the Łowcy.B cabaret;
- Henryk Fojcik - sculptor, author of a monumental altar in the Church in Rybnik;
- Waldemar Socha, who has been the mayor of Żory since 1998.

== See also ==
- Choir Voce Segreto
- Karol Miarka

== Bibliography ==
- Bogdan Cimała, Jan Delowicz, Paweł Porwoł, Żory. Zarys dziejów. Wypisy, Rada Miejska, Zarząd Miastka, Towarzystwo Miłośników Miasta Żory, 1994.
- Leokadia Koper, Liceum Ogólnokształcące im. Karola Miarki w Żorach: monografia 1922-1997, 1997.
