= Pielgrzymowice, Silesian Voivodeship =

Pielgrzymowice
- Village
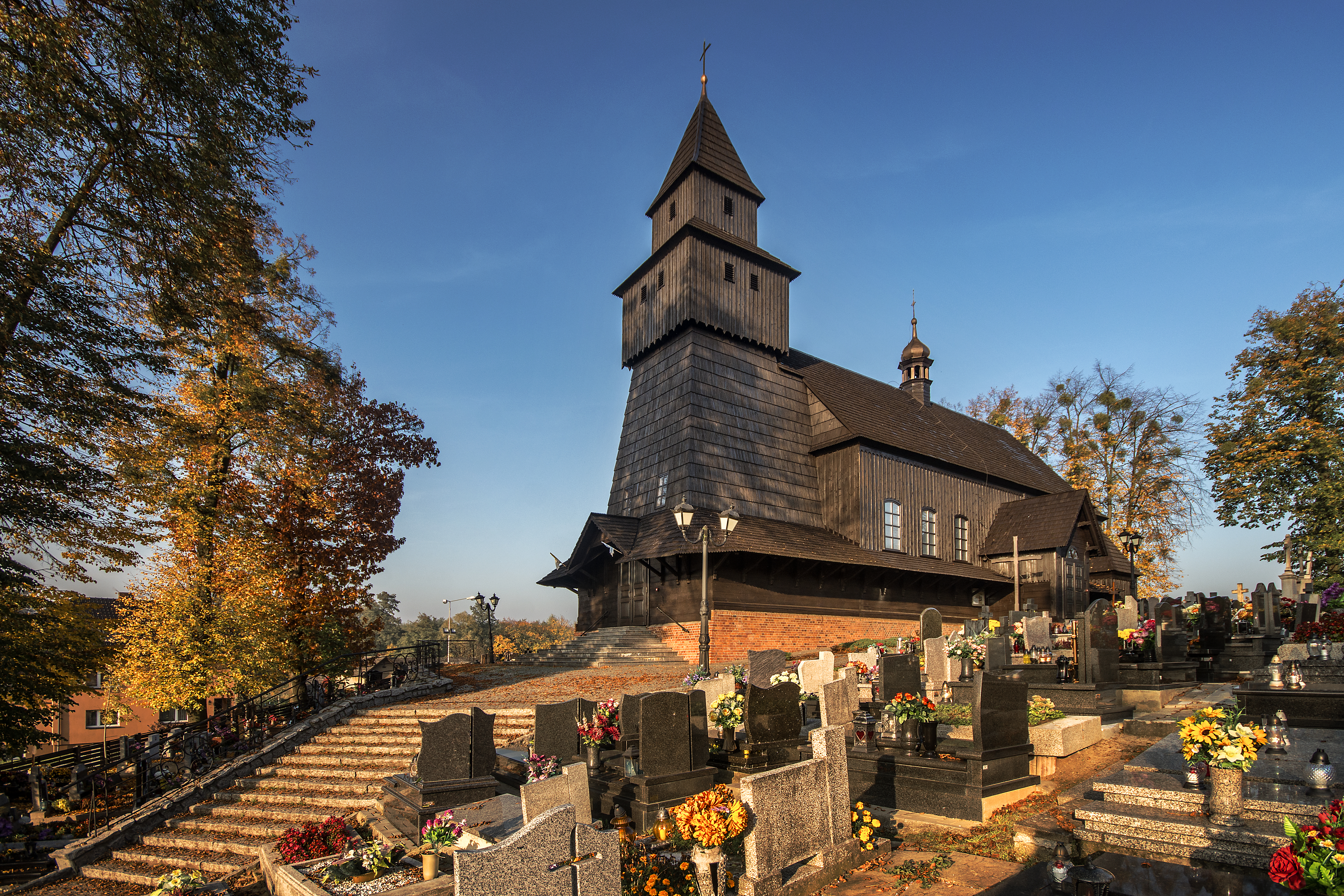
- Church of Saint Catherine of Alexandria

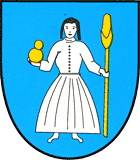
- Coat of arms

- Location within Poland
- Coordinates: 49°54′23″N 18°39′50″E
- Country: Poland
- Voivodeship: Silesian
- County: Pszczyna
- Gmina: Pawłowice
- First mentioned: ca. 1305

Area
  - Total: 13.17 km^{2} (5.08 sq mi)

Population
  - Total: 2,395
  - Density: 181.9/km^{2} (471.0/sq mi)

Pielgrzymowice (Polish pronunciation: [pjɛlɡʐɨmɔˈvit͡sɛ]; German: Pilgramsdorf) is a village in the administrative district of Gmina Pawłowice, within Pszczyna County, Silesian Voivodeship, in southern Poland.

The village was first mentioned in a Latin document of Diocese of Wrocław called Liber fundationis episcopatus Vratislaviensis from around 1305 as item in Peregrini villa debent esse XXIII) mansi. The creation of the village was a part of a larger settlement campaign taking place in the late 13th century on the territory of what will be later known as Upper Silesia.

== Notable people ==
- Karol Miarka (1825-1891), Polish social and national activist
