= Karol Miarka (father) =

Polish social activist, writer, and printer (1825-1882)

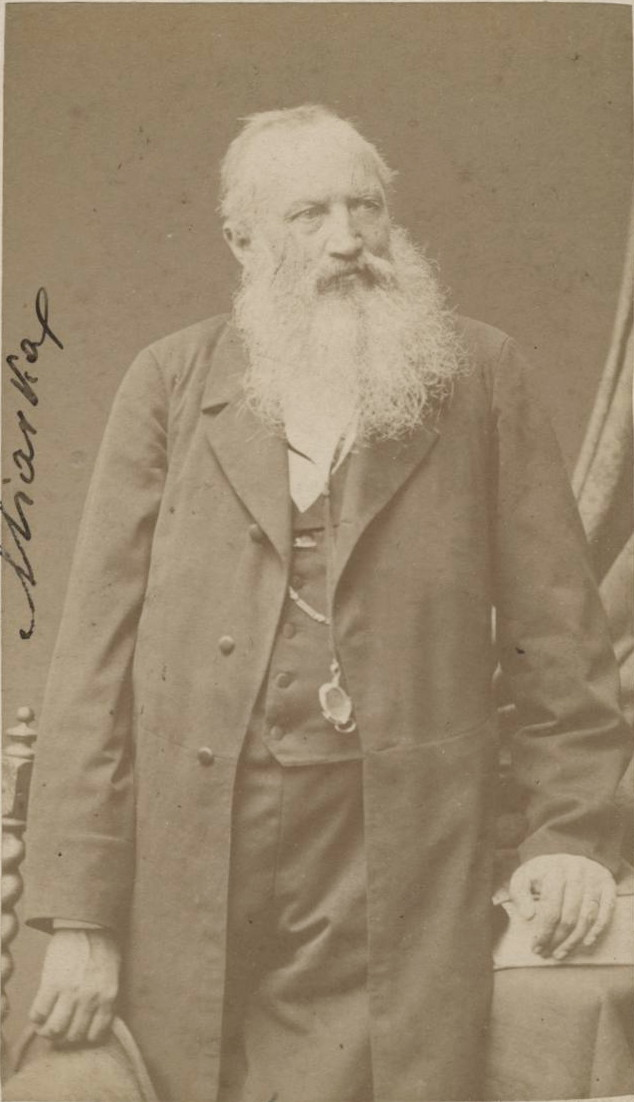
- Born: 22 October 1825; Pielgrzymowice
- Died: 15 August 1882 (aged 56); Cieszyn
- Occupations: Polish social activist, teacher, writer, publicist and printer

Karol Miarka also called Elder or Father (22 October 1825 – 15 August 1882) was a Polish social activist in Upper Silesia, teacher, writer, publicist and printer. Initiator of the establishment and organizer of many Polish social and economic organizations.

== Biography ==
Son of Antoni, a teacher, and Karolina. Father of Karol, called the younger, a Silesian writer, publicist and publisher.

Initially he studied at his father's school in Pielgrzymowice, and later at gymnasiums in Pszczyna and Gliwice. In 1846, he graduated from the teachers' seminary in Głogówek, after which he was a folk teacher in Lędziny, Urbanowice, Piotrowice. From 1850 he served as a teacher in Pielgrzymowice. He was also an organist, then a municipal scribe and an adjudicator.

Miarka's consciousness was to some extent influenced by Bernard Bogedain, an advocate of learning the Polish language among Poles in Silesia, whom he met in 1853 during his visit to the Pielgrzymowice school. Miarka was also greatly influenced by Paweł Stalmach and Józef Chociszewski, the proofreaders of his debut novel about the beginnings of Christianity in Upper Silesia, Klemensowa Górka.

In the years 1861–1868, he collaborated with the magazine Gwiazdka Cieszyńska. He was an active organizer of the Upper Silesian social and cultural movement, and contributed significantly to the establishment of contacts between Upper Silesia and other Polish districts. He corresponded with the Polish writer Józef Kraszewski and maintained contacts with Władyslaw Bełza. In 1868-1869 he edited the periodical Zwiastun Górnośląski, and later in Königshütte (today's Chorzów) he published Katolik (1869–80), one of the more important periodicals fighting for the Polishness of the Upper Silesian people. He founded a circulation Catholic Bookstore, initiated the Catholic Library series in 1870, published calendars; established the Kasyno Katolickie association, where he organized amateur theatrical meetings from 1870 onward, the Kółko Katolickie, the Poczciwych Wiarusów Company, the Upper Silesian Loan Society of Vlasans in Mikołów and others. Affiliated with the German Centre Party, he opposed the policy of kulturkampf and Germanization, for which he was persecuted and imprisoned several times. Over the course of 10 years, he faced 16 lawsuits, resulting in sentences of imprisonment or financial penalties.

In 1875–1880, he continued his activities in Mikołów, where he established a printing house; in addition to the Katolik, he published other periodicals, such as the educational and moralistic weekly Monika. He treated journalistic and literary works equally, linking them to the concrete situation in Upper Silesia. In 1876, he participated in parliamentary actions and ran for parliament. In 1879, he founded a committee to help the starving population of Silesia. In 1881, due to ill health, another court sentence and harassment by the authorities, he sold the Katolik to Rev. Stanisław Radziejewski, and passed the printing house to his son, also Karol, who turned it into a modern printing plant in 1894.

He is buried at the Communal Cemetery in Cieszyn, the capital of Cieszyn Silesia.

== Works ==
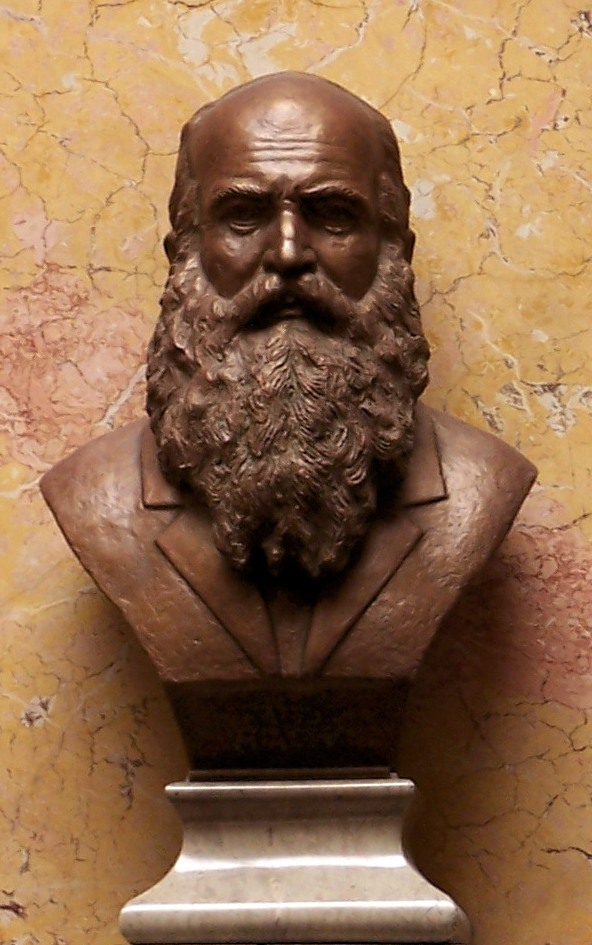
Karol Miarka - a bust in the hall of the Silesian Parliament.

Karol Miarka's literary work focused on the Silesian land, folk tales, the history of the region and its folklore. He introduced folk forms, storytelling and proverbs into his writing. He published a number of works popularizing the historical subjects of Silesia. He wrote, among others:

- Góra Klemensowa – a novel published in Gwiazdka Cieszyńska,
- Szwedzi w Lędzinach – published in Mikołów, available on Polona website in digital version,
- Głos wołającego na puszczy górnośląskiej, czyli o stosunkach ludu polskiego na pruskim Śląsku – 1865, available on Polona website in digital version,
- Pruski Górnoślązak i Wielkopolanin – a report on a journey through Greater Poland showing the region's ties to Silesia,
- Żuawi – published in1869 in Königshütte, available on PBI digital pages,
- Husyci na Górnym Śląsku, czyli Powieść o zamordowaniu kapłana Walentego, założeniu Kościoła Jankowskiego i oblężeniu Żorów w roku 1433 – published in 1865 in Poznań, available on Polona digital pages,
- Sądy boże (novel, 1870), 1895.
- Petronela, pustelnica na Górze św. Anny (novel, 1876–1877),1877.
- Kultura (drama, Gwiazdka Cieszyńska, 1864), another edition under the title Kulturnik - published in Mikołów in 1895, available on PBI digital pages,
- Bóg widzi (novel, 1873) – novel with a thriller plot.

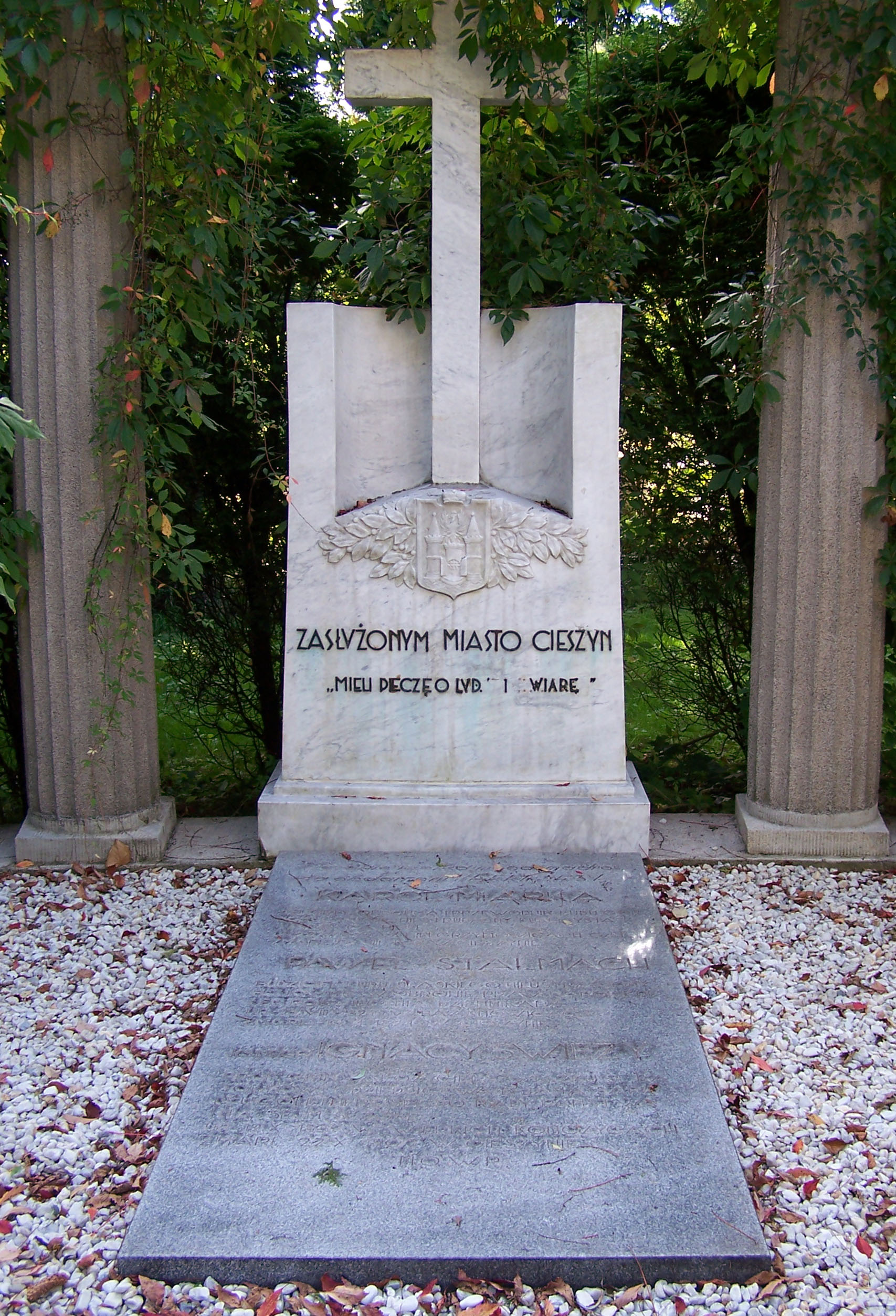
The grave of Karol Miarka, Paweł Stalmach and Ignacy Świeży at the Communal Cemetery in Cieszyn

Other titles established after Zofia Kossak:

- Fragmenta z podróży do Gniezna
- Kalwaria
- Życiorys św. Piusa IX
- Żywcem zamurowana
- Przyjaciel górników i robotników
- Odpuść nam
- Masoni, czyli Wolnomularze
- Cudowne objawienie proroctwa i przepowiednie tyczące przyszłości Polski
- Żłóbek
- Kogo wybierać, czyli Pouczenie wyborcze

== Legacy ==
- He is the patron of many schools in Poland, including: District School Complex No. 2 in Pszczyna, Elementary School in Przyszowice, Elementary School No. 30 in Ruda Śląska, 1st Liceum in Mikołów, Karol Miarka Liceum in Żory, Elementary School in Ornontowice, Municipal Elementary School No. 2 with Integrated Branches in Knurów, Elementary School No. 1 in Rydułtowy, Elementary School with Integrated Branches No. 1 in Lędziny, Elementary School No. 21 in Rybnik, Elementary School in Pielgrzymowice and Elementary School in Olza.
- A monument was erected to Karol Miarka in Zabrze.
- In Prudnik, an estate of single-family houses and a street were named after Karol Miarka.

== Bibliography ==
- Literatura polska. Przewodnik encyklopedyczny Tom I A-M, PWN Warszawa 1984, p. 660.
- Kazimierz Popiołek, Historia Śląska od pradziejów do 1945 roku, Śląski Instytut Naukowy, Katowice 1972, ISBN 83-216-0151-0, p. 350–357.
- Bogusław Bromboszcz, Ryszard Szendzielarz, Drukarnia im. Karola Miarki w Mikołowie, Tolek, 2005.
