= Mokre, Mikołów =

Mokre
- Sołectwo of Mikołów
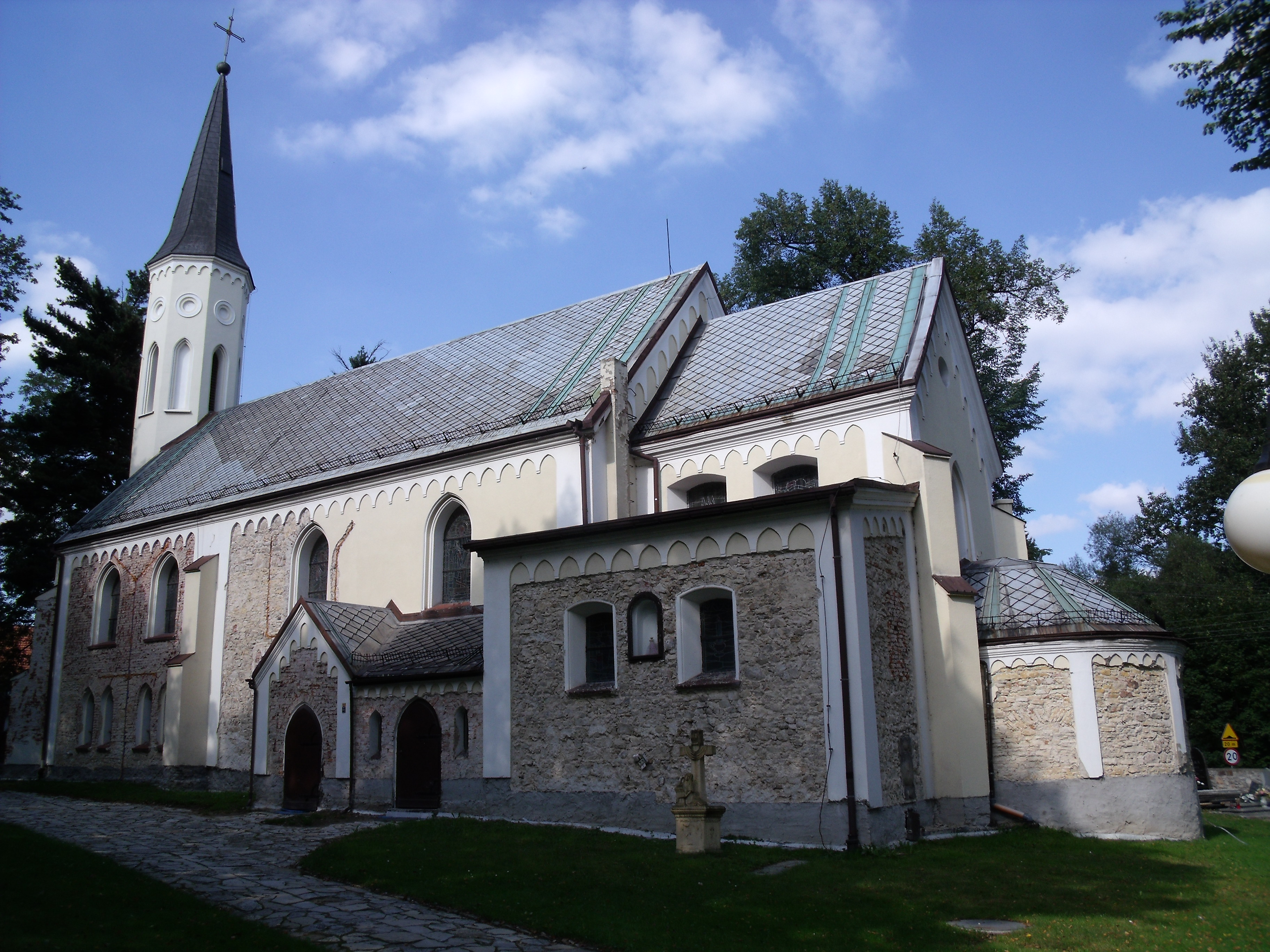
- Saint Lawrence church

- Location within Poland Location within Silesian Voivodeship
- Coordinates: 50°10′43″N 18°51′24″E
- Country: Poland
- Voivodeship: Silesian
- County/City: Mikołów
- Time zone: UTC+1 (CET)
  - Summer (DST): UTC+2 (CEST)
- Area code: (+48) 032
- Vehicle registration: SMI

Mokre (German: Mokrau) is a sołectwo in the west of Mikołów, Silesian Voivodeship, southern Poland. It was an independent village but became administratively part of Mikołów in 1975.

== History ==
The local parish was mentioned in 1337, and in 1422 the village belonged to a knight Piotr Kiczka. The village was part of the Polish Duchy of Opole and Racibórz, created as a result of the fragmentation of medieval Piast-ruled Poland. In the mid-18th century it was annexed by the Kingdom of Prussia, and from 1871 it was part of Germany.

After World War I, in 1918 Poland regained independence, and in the Upper Silesia plebiscite 890 out of 1164 voters in Mokre voted in favour of joining Poland, against 269 opting for staying in Germany.

During World War II Mokre was occupied by Germany. In the final stages of the war, in January 1945, the Germans murdered 13 prisoners of the Auschwitz concentration camp in Mokre during a death march.
