= Opawskie Mountains =

Mountain range in the Czech Republic and Poland

- Zlaté Hory Highlands
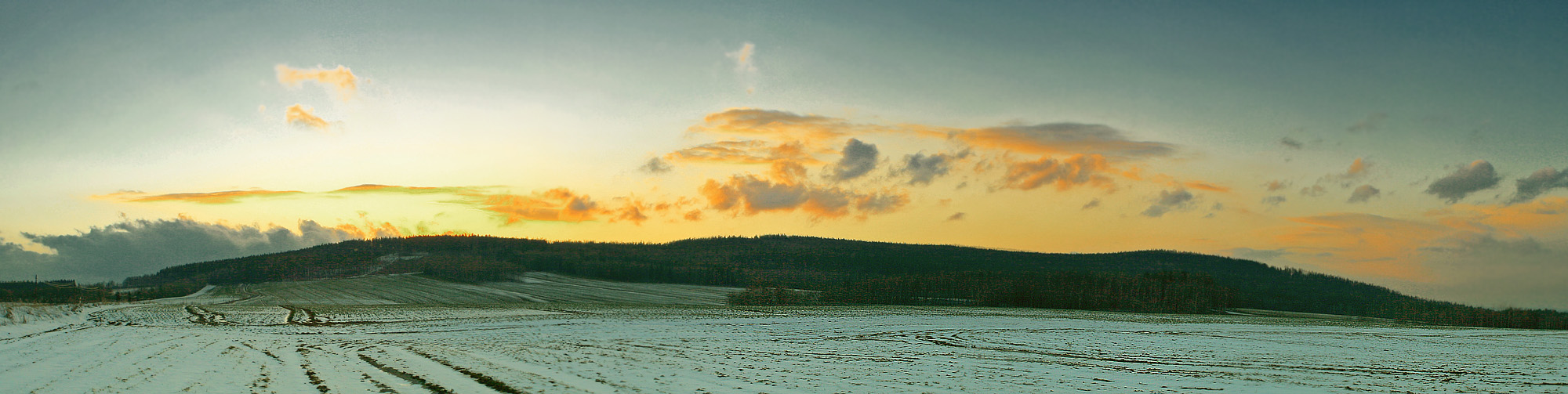
- Mt. Parkowa (Chrobrego) massif

Highest point
- Peak: Příčný vrch
- Elevation: 975 m (3,199 ft)
- Coordinates: 50°13′12″N 17°23′2″E

Naming
- Native name: Oppagebirge (German); Góry Opawskie (Polish); Zlatohorská vrchovina (Czech)

Geography
- Location within Czech Republic Location within Poland
- Location: Olomouc Region (CZ); Moravian-Silesian Region (CZ); Opole Voivodeship (PL)
- Countries: Czech Republic and Poland
- Parent range: Eastern Sudetes

Geology
- Rock age(s): Devonian; Carboniferous (Tournaisian–Viséan)
- Rock type(s): Metamorphic rocks (gneiss, amphibolite, quartzite, phyllite), granite, Culm measures

The Opawskie Mountains are a mountain range of the Sudetes in the Czech Republic and Poland.

== Location ==
The Opawskie Mountains stretch from northern Czech Silesia into Polish Upper Silesia, the eastern continuation of the Golden Mountains range. The Polish part of the range includes the protected area known as Opawskie Mountains Landscape Park. It is named after the Opava River. The highest peak is Příčný vrch (975 metres above sea level).

== Geology ==
The geology of the range includes metamorphic rocks (e.g. gneiss, amphibolite, quartzite, phyllite) as well as granite intrusions and Carboniferous Culm units, as shown in the national geological map service of the Czech Geological Survey.

== Towns and villages ==
=== Poland ===
- Prudnik
- Głuchołazy
- Jarnołtówek
- Pokrzywna
- Łąka Prudnicka
- Moszczanka
- Trzebina
- Skrzypiec
- Dytmarów
- Krzyżkowice
- Dębowiec
- Opawica
- Lenarcice
- Krasne Pole
- Chomiąża
- Pietrowice
- Ciermięcice
- Pielgrzymów
- Dobieszów
- Gołuszowice
- Zopowy
- Zubrzyce
- Włodzienin
- Lewice
- Bliszczyce
- Branice

=== Czech Republic ===
- Jeseník
- Mikulovice
- Rejvíz
- Zlaté Hory
