= Jakubowicz =

Jakubowicz is a Polish surname that may refer to the following notable people:

== People ==
- Andrew Jakubowicz, a Jewish Australian academic currently serving as Professor of Sociology at the University of Technology Sydney.
- Andrzej Jakubowicz (born 1958), Polish former international table tennis player.
- Karol Jakubowicz (died 2013), Polish academic.
- Rafał Jakubowicz (born 1974), Polish visual artist and art critic.

== Other ==
- Izaak Jakubowicz Synagogue

== See also ==
- Jakubowice (disambiguation) (toponym)
- Jakubovice (Czech toponym)
