= Gmina Branice =

Gmina Branice Branice Commune
- Gmina
- Coat of arms
- Interactive map of Gmina Branice
- Coordinates (Branice): 50°3′5″N 17°47′41″E
- Country: Poland
- Voivodeship: Opole
- County: Głubczyce
- Seat: Branice

Area
  - Total: 121.87 km^{2} (47.05 sq mi)

Population (2019-06-30)
  - Total: 6,489
  - Density: 53.25/km^{2} (137.9/sq mi)
- Time zone: UTC+1 (CET)
  - Summer (DST): UTC+2 (CEST)
- Vehicle registration: OGL
- Website: http://branice.pl

Gmina Branice is an urban-rural gmina (administrative district) in Głubczyce County, Opole Voivodeship, in southern Poland, on the Czech border. Its seat is the town of Branice, which lies approximately 17 kilometres (11 mi) south of Głubczyce and 69 km (43 mi) south of the regional capital Opole.

The gmina covers an area of 121.87 square kilometres (47.1 sq mi), and as of 2019 its total population is 6,489.

== Geography ==
Gmina Branice lies partly on the Głubczyce Plateau (a part of the Silesian Lowlands) and partly in the Opawskie Mountains (a part of the Eastern Sudetes). The gmina is located on the left bank of the Opava River.

== Villages ==
Gmina Branice contains the villages and settlements of Bliszczyce, Boboluszki, Branice, Dzbańce, Dzbańce-Osiedle, Dzierżkowice, Gródczany, Jabłonka, Jakubowice, Jędrychowice, Lewice, Michałkowice, Niekazanice, Posucice, Turków, Uciechowice, Włodzienin, Wódka and Wysoka.

== Neighbouring gminas ==
Gmina Branice is bordered by the gminas of Głubczyce and Kietrz. It also borders the Czech Republic (municipalities of Krnov, Úvalno, Brumovice, Holasovice and Opava).
