= Pielgrzymowice =

Pielgrzymowice may refer to the following places:

- Pielgrzymowice, Lesser Poland Voivodeship (south Poland)
- Pielgrzymowice, Opole Voivodeship (south-west Poland)
- Pielgrzymowice, Silesian Voivodeship (south Poland)
