= Jabłonka =

Jabłonka may refer to the following places:

- Jabłonka, Lesser Poland Voivodeship (south Poland)
- Jabłonka, Łódź Voivodeship (central Poland)
- Jabłonka, Subcarpathian Voivodeship (south-east Poland)
- Jabłonka, Greater Poland Voivodeship (west-central Poland)
- Jabłonka, Lubusz Voivodeship (west Poland)
- Jabłonka, Opole Voivodeship (south-west Poland)
- Jabłonka, Pomeranian Voivodeship (north Poland)
- Jabłonka, Nidzica County in Warmian-Masurian Voivodeship (north Poland)
- Jabłonka, Ostróda County in Warmian-Masurian Voivodeship (north Poland)
- Jabłonka, Szczytno County in Warmian-Masurian Voivodeship (north Poland)

== See also ==
- Jablonka (disambiguation)
