= Gmina Wilków =

Gmina Wilków may refer to either of the following rural administrative districts in Poland:

- Gmina Wilków, Opole Voivodeship
- Gmina Wilków, Lublin Voivodeship
