= Pößnitz =

Pößnitz may refer to:

- Pößnitz (river), of Brandenburg, Germany
- Pesnica (river) (German name Pößnitz), of Styria, Austria and Styria, Slovenia
- Posucice (German name Pößnitz), a village in south-western Poland
- Pößnitz, a Katastralgemeinde of the municipality Leutschach an der Weinstraße, Styria, Austria
