= Jacobowitz =

Jacobowitz is a Yiddish-language variant of the East Slavic surname Yakubovich. It is a patronymic surname literally meaning "son of Jacob" in Slavic. Notable people with the surname include:

- Montana Jacobowitz
- Alex Jacobowitz
- Eden Jacobowitz
