= Jakubowice =

Jakubowice may refer to the following places in Poland:

- Jakubowice, Lower Silesian Voivodeship (south-west Poland)
- Jakubowice, Lublin Voivodeship (east Poland)
- Jakubowice, Lesser Poland Voivodeship (south Poland)
- Jakubowice, Opatów County in Świętokrzyskie Voivodeship (south-central Poland)
- Jakubowice, Pińczów County in Świętokrzyskie Voivodeship (south-central Poland)
- Jakubowice, Włoszczowa County in Świętokrzyskie Voivodeship (south-central Poland)
- Jakubowice, Głubczyce County in Opole Voivodeship (south-west Poland)
- Jakubowice, Kędzierzyn-Koźle County in Opole Voivodeship (south-west Poland)
- Jakubowice, Kluczbork County in Opole Voivodeship (south-west Poland)
- Jakubowice, Namysłów County in Opole Voivodeship (south-west Poland)
- Jakubowice, Gmina Niemodlin, Opole County in Opole Voivodeship (south-west Poland)
