= Turkov =

Turkov, Turkow, Turkova or Turkovs may refer to

Places

- Turków, a village in south-western Poland
- Turkova Draga, an abandoned village in southern Slovenia

Surname

- Jonas Turkow (1898–1987), Polish actor, stage manager, director and writer
- Valentina Turkova, Soviet rower
- Daniils Turkovs (born 1988), Latvian footballer
- Tatyana Turkova (born 1988), Kazakhstani athlete
