= Pszeniczna =

- Village
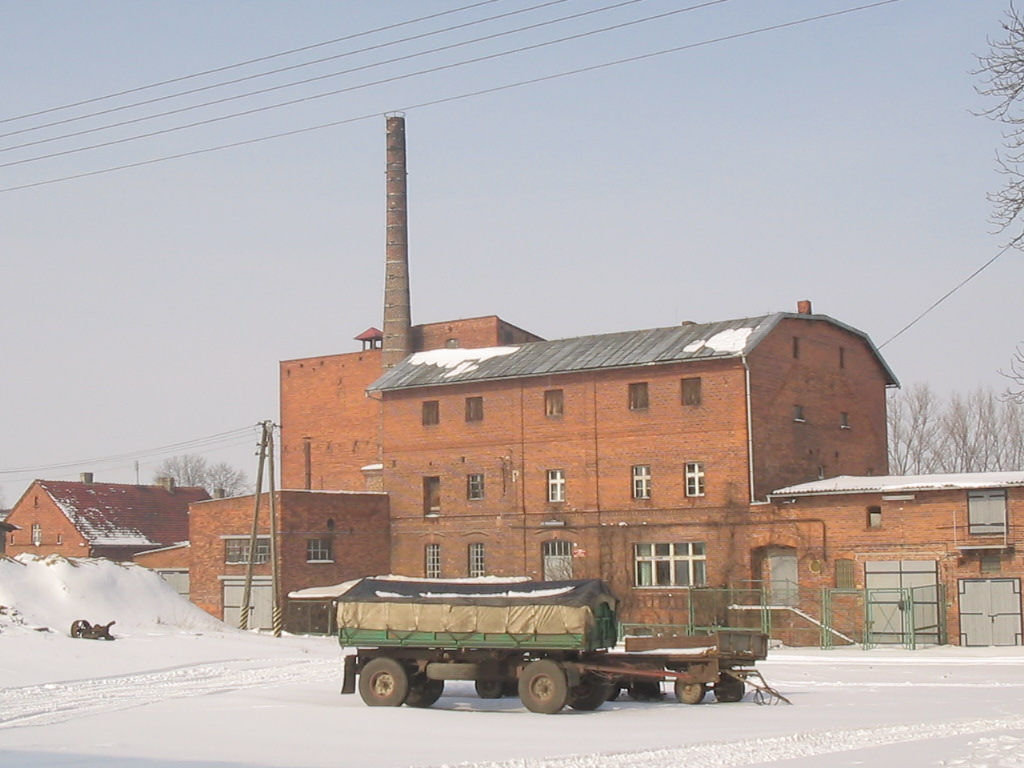
- Distillery in Pszeniczna

- Location within Poland
- Coordinates: 51°09′57″N 17°37′21″E
- Country: Poland
- Voivodeship: Opole
- County: Namysłów
- Gmina: Wilków
- Population: 247

Pszeniczna [pʂɛˈnit͡ʂna] is a village in the administrative district of Gmina Wilków, within Namysłów County, Opole Voivodeship, in south-western Poland.
