= Pągów, Opole Voivodeship =

Pągów
- Village
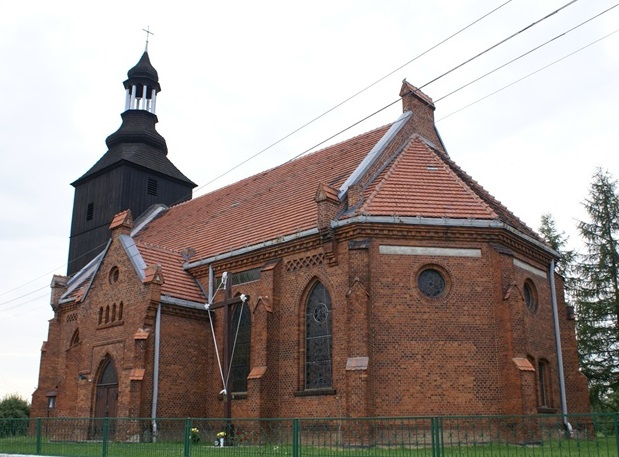
- Saints Peter and Paul church in Pągów

- Location within Poland
- Coordinates: 51°9′N 17°38′E
- Country: Poland
- Voivodeship: Opole
- County: Namysłów
- Gmina: Wilków
- Time zone: UTC+1 (CET)
  - Summer (DST): UTC+2 (CEST)
- Vehicle registration: ONA

Pągów [ˈpɔnɡuf] is a village in the administrative district of Gmina Wilków, within Namysłów County, Opole Voivodeship, in south-western Poland.

== History ==
The village dates back to the Middle Ages. Within Piast-ruled Poland, it was the location of a motte-and-bailey castle from the 13th-14th century, which is now an archaeological site. In the 18th century, the village was annexed by Prussia, and from 1871 to 1945 it was also part of Germany, before it became again part of Poland following Germany's defeat in World War II.
