= Uciechowice =

- Village
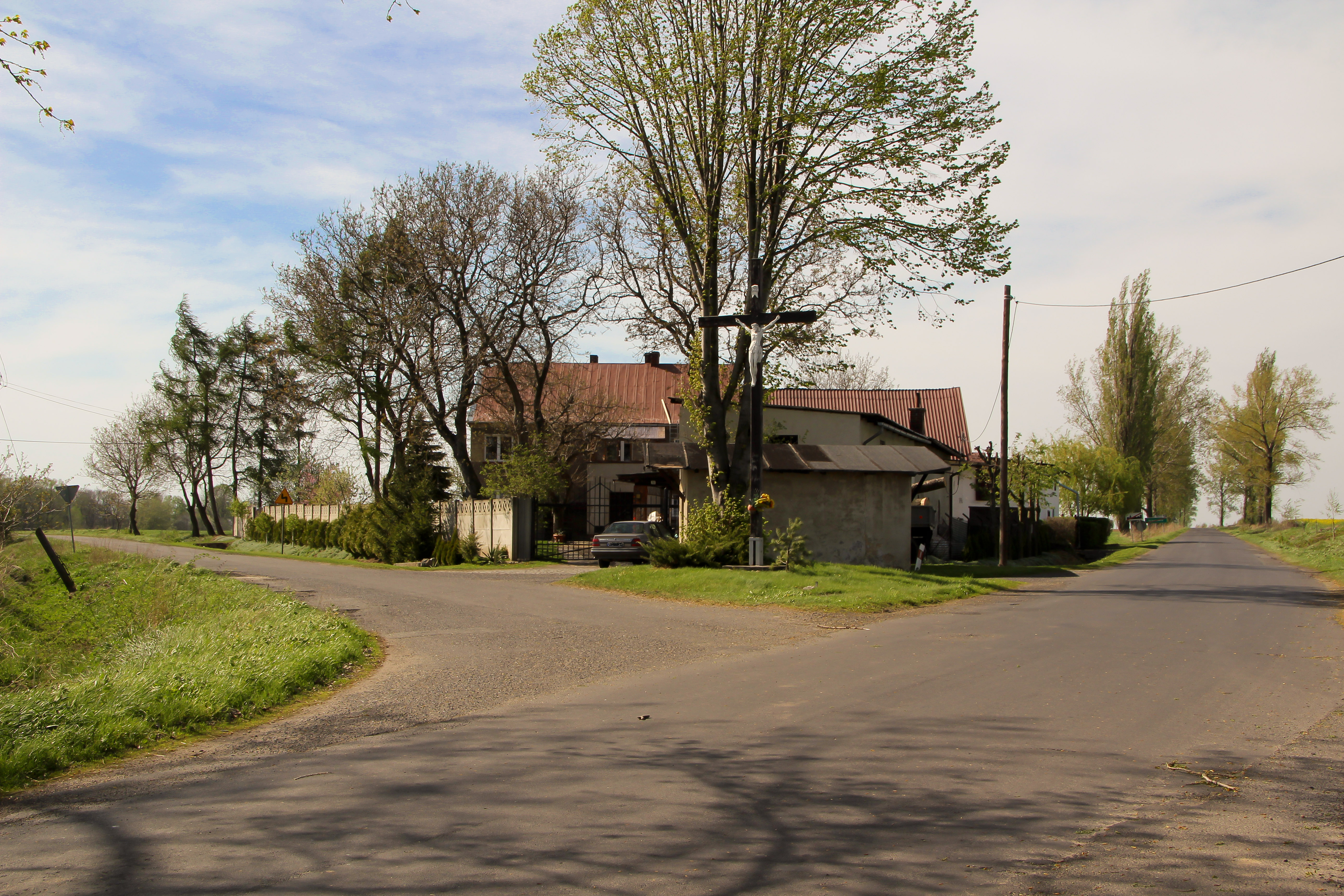

- Location within Poland
- Coordinates: 50°0′N 17°53′E
- Country: Poland
- Voivodeship: Opole
- County: Głubczyce
- Gmina: Branice

Uciechowice [ut͡ɕɛxɔˈvit͡sɛ] is a village in the administrative district of Gmina Branice, within Głubczyce County, Opole Voivodeship, in south-western Poland, close to the Czech border.
