= Wysoka, Głubczyce County =

Wysoka
- Village
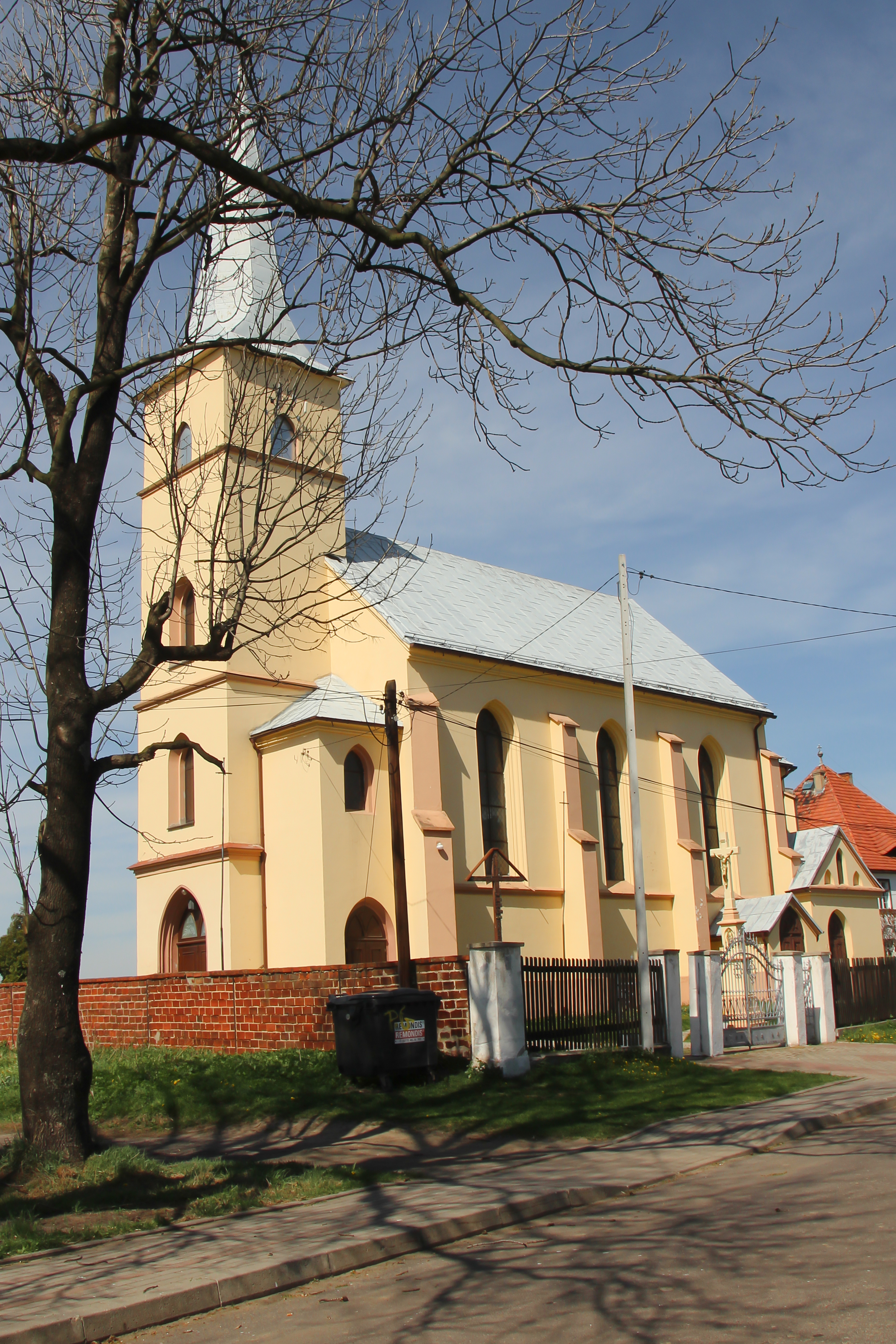

- Location within Poland
- Coordinates: 50°1′20″N 17°49′22″E
- Country: Poland
- Voivodeship: Opole
- County: Głubczyce
- Gmina: Branice

Population (approx.)
  - Total: 650
- Time zone: UTC+1 (CET)
  - Summer (DST): UTC+2 (CEST)
- Vehicle registration: OGL

Wysoka [vɨˈsɔka] is a village in the administrative district of Gmina Branice, within Głubczyce County, Opole Voivodeship, in south-western Poland, close to the Czech border.

The name of the village is of Polish origin and comes from the word wysoka, which means "high", referring to the elevation of the village.
