= Wódka, Opole Voivodeship =

Wódka
- Village
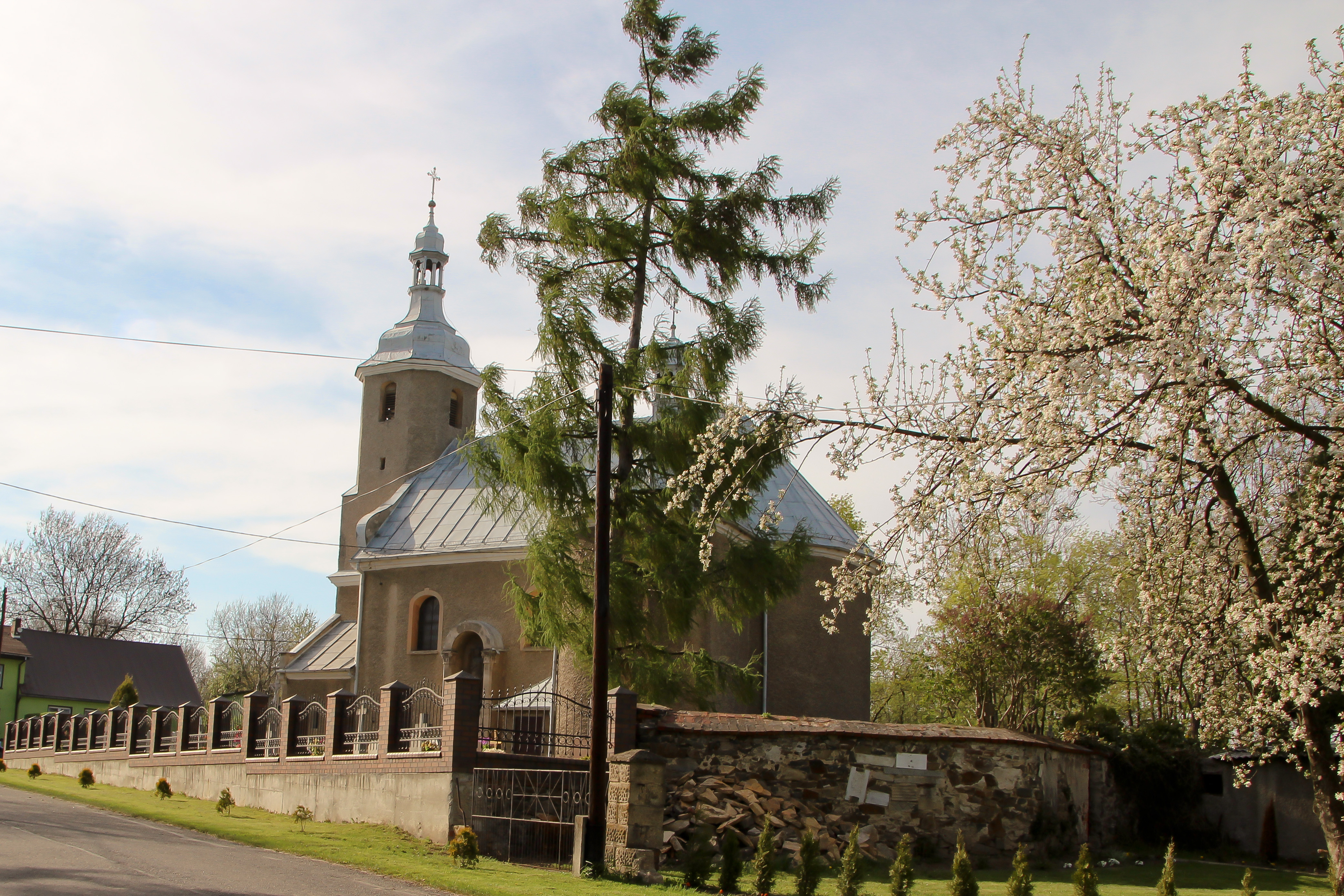

- Location within Poland
- Coordinates: 50°4′N 17°51′E
- Country: Poland
- Voivodeship: Opole
- County: Głubczyce
- Population: 230

Wódka [ˈvutka] is a village in the administrative district of Gmina Branice, within Głubczyce County, Opole Voivodeship, in south-western Poland, close to the Czech border.
