= Dzbańce =

- Village
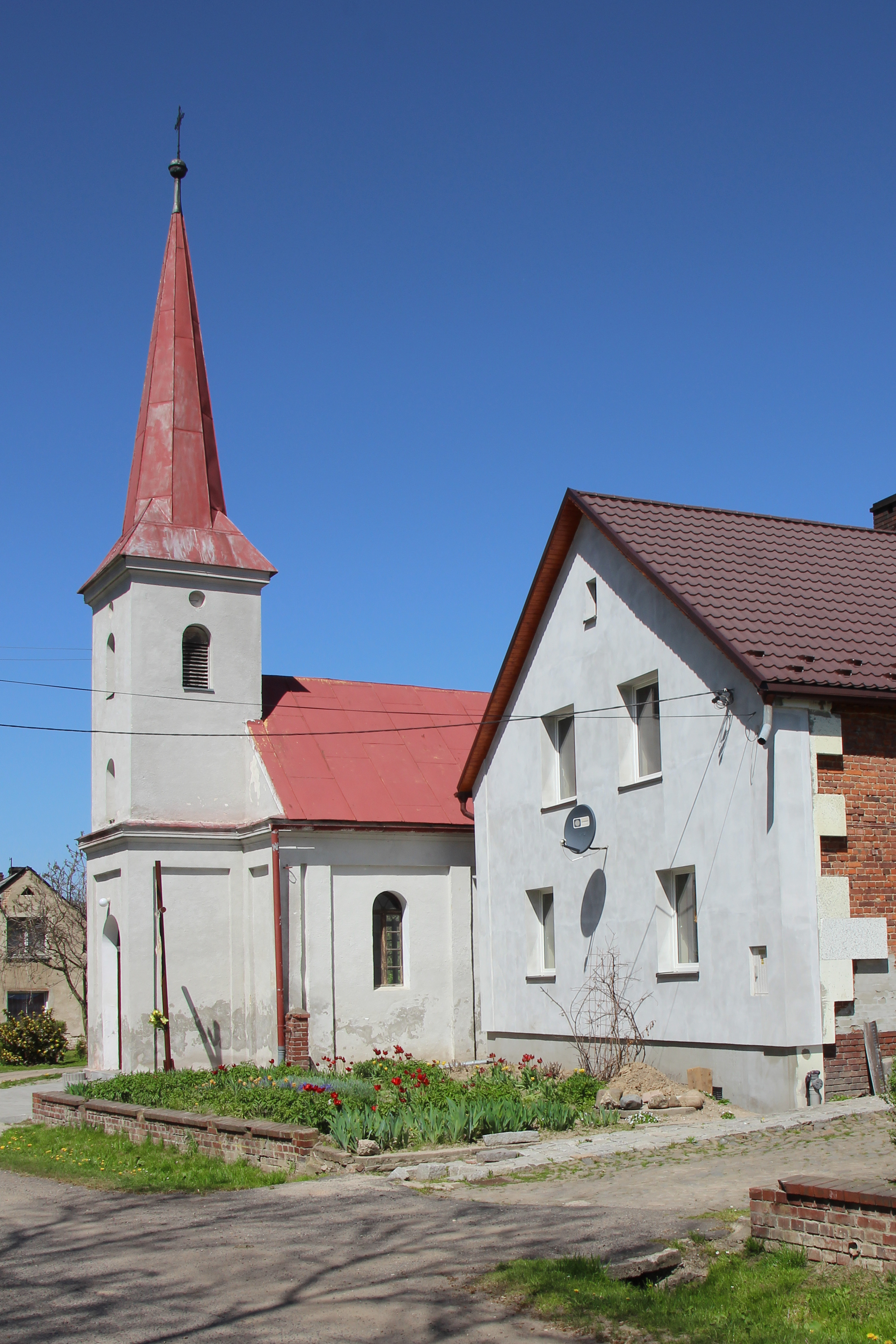

- Location within Poland
- Coordinates: 50°5′30″N 17°51′4″E
- Country: Poland
- Voivodeship: Opole
- County: Głubczyce
- Gmina: Branice
- Population: 51

Dzbańce [ˈd͡zbaɲt͡sɛ] is a village in the administrative district of Gmina Branice, within Głubczyce County, Opole Voivodeship, in south-western Poland, close to the Czech border.
