= Dzierżkowice, Opole Voivodeship =

Dzierżkowice
- Village
- Interactive map of Dzierżkowice
- Location within Poland
- Coordinates: 49°59′N 17°51′E
- Country: Poland
- Voivodeship: Opole
- County: Głubczyce
- Gmina: Branice

Dzierżkowice [d͡ʑɛrʂkɔˈvit͡sɛ] is a village in the administrative district of Gmina Branice, within Głubczyce County, Opole Voivodeship, in south-western Poland, close to the Czech border.

== History ==
The present-day Polish village Dzierżkowice and the present-day Czech village Držkovice, directly across the Czech side of the border, were once a single village. After the Silesian Wars, the newly drawn border divided the village in two. The division continued through the Communist era of 1945–1990, and the border was not easily crossed until the two countries joined the Schengen Area in 2007.
