= Brumovice (Opava District) =

- Municipality
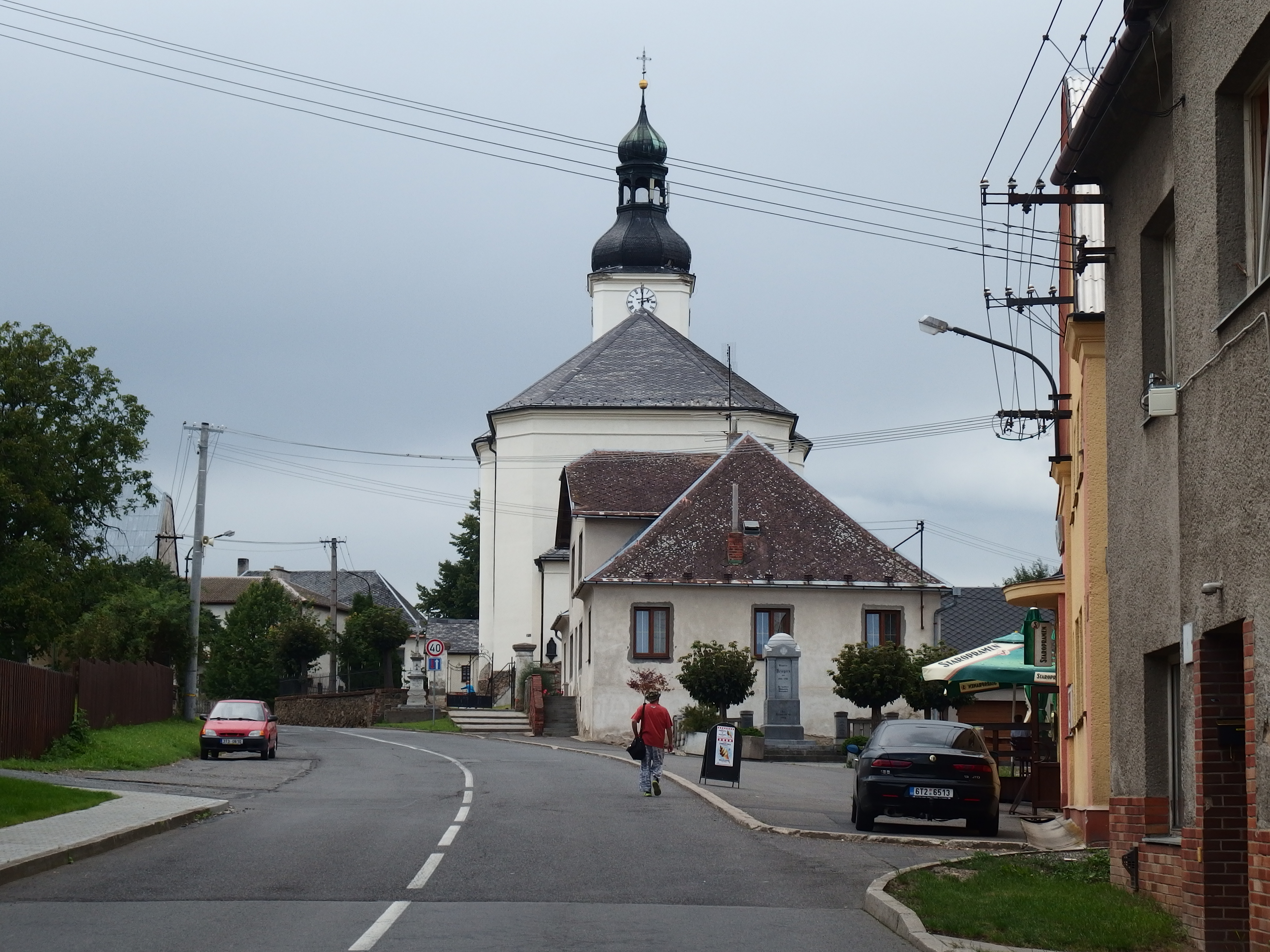
- Centre of Brumovice with Church of the Nativity of the Virgin Mary

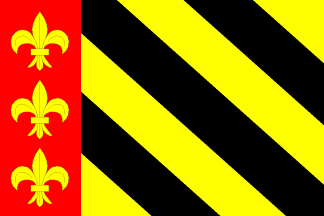
- Flag Coat of arms

- Location in the Czech Republic
- Coordinates: 50°0′55″N 17°44′59″E
- Country: Czech Republic
- Region: Moravian-Silesian
- District: Opava
- First mentioned: 1377

Area
  - Total: 25.53 km^{2} (9.86 sq mi)
- Elevation: 351 m (1,152 ft)

Population (2026-01-01)
  - Total: 1,534
  - Density: 60.09/km^{2} (155.6/sq mi)
- Time zone: UTC+1 (CET)
  - Summer (DST): UTC+2 (CEST)
- Postal code: 747 71
- Website: www.brumovice-op.cz

Brumovice (German: Braunsdorf) is a municipality and village in Opava District in the Moravian-Silesian Region of the Czech Republic. It has about 1,500 inhabitants.

== Administrative division ==
Brumovice consists of six municipal parts (in brackets population according to the 2021 census):

- Brumovice (866)
- Kolná (22)
- Pocheň (24)
- Pustý Mlýn (80)
- Skrochovice (325)
- Úblo (147)

== Geography ==
Brumovice is located about 12 kilometres (7 mi) northwest from Opava and 38 km (24 mi) northwest from Ostrava, on the border with Poland. It lies mostly in the Nízký Jeseník range, only a small eastern part extends into the Opava Hilly Land. The highest point is at 427 m (1,401 ft) above sea level. The Hořina and Čižina streams flow through the municipality. The Czech–Polish border is formed by the Opava River.

== History ==
The first written mention of Brumovice is from 1377, when it became part of the Duchy of Krnov.

Brumovice was severely damaged during the Thirty Years' War. In the 1670s, Germanisation took place, but at the end of the century the village was still ethnically mixed. In the 18th century, during the rule of the House of Liechtenstein, Germanisation continued.

The village of Skrochovice was the site of the first Polenlager camp. It was set up by Nazi Germany in the former sugar factory in August 1939 in anticipation of the imminent attack on Poland. The KT camp was staffed before the actual invasion, with guards recruited by the SS from Krnov and Opava.

The camp, called KZ Skrochowitz was an old sugar refinery set up for Polish military prisoners and civilian hostages captured during the September campaign. The camp functioned until 15 December 1939, with some 700 prisoners of Polish nationality brought in from Cieszyn Silesia and Upper Silesia.

== Demographics ==
Historical population

Year	Pop.	±%
1869	2,098	—
1880	2,304	+9.8%
1890	2,459	+6.7%
1900	2,451	−0.3%
1910	2,346	−4.3%

Year	Pop.	±%
1921	2,357	+0.5%
1930	2,557	+8.5%
1950	1,496	−41.5%
1961	1,529	+2.2%
1970	1,358	−11.2%

Year	Pop.	±%
1980	1,421	+4.6%
1991	1,429	+0.6%
2001	1,451	+1.5%
2011	1,429	−1.5%
2021	1,464	+2.4%

Source: Censuses

== Transport ==
The I/57 road from Opava to Krnov runs through the municipality. On the Czech–Polish border is the road border crossing Skrochovice / Boboluszki.

The village of Skrochovice is located on the railway line Opava–Rýmařov.

== Sights ==
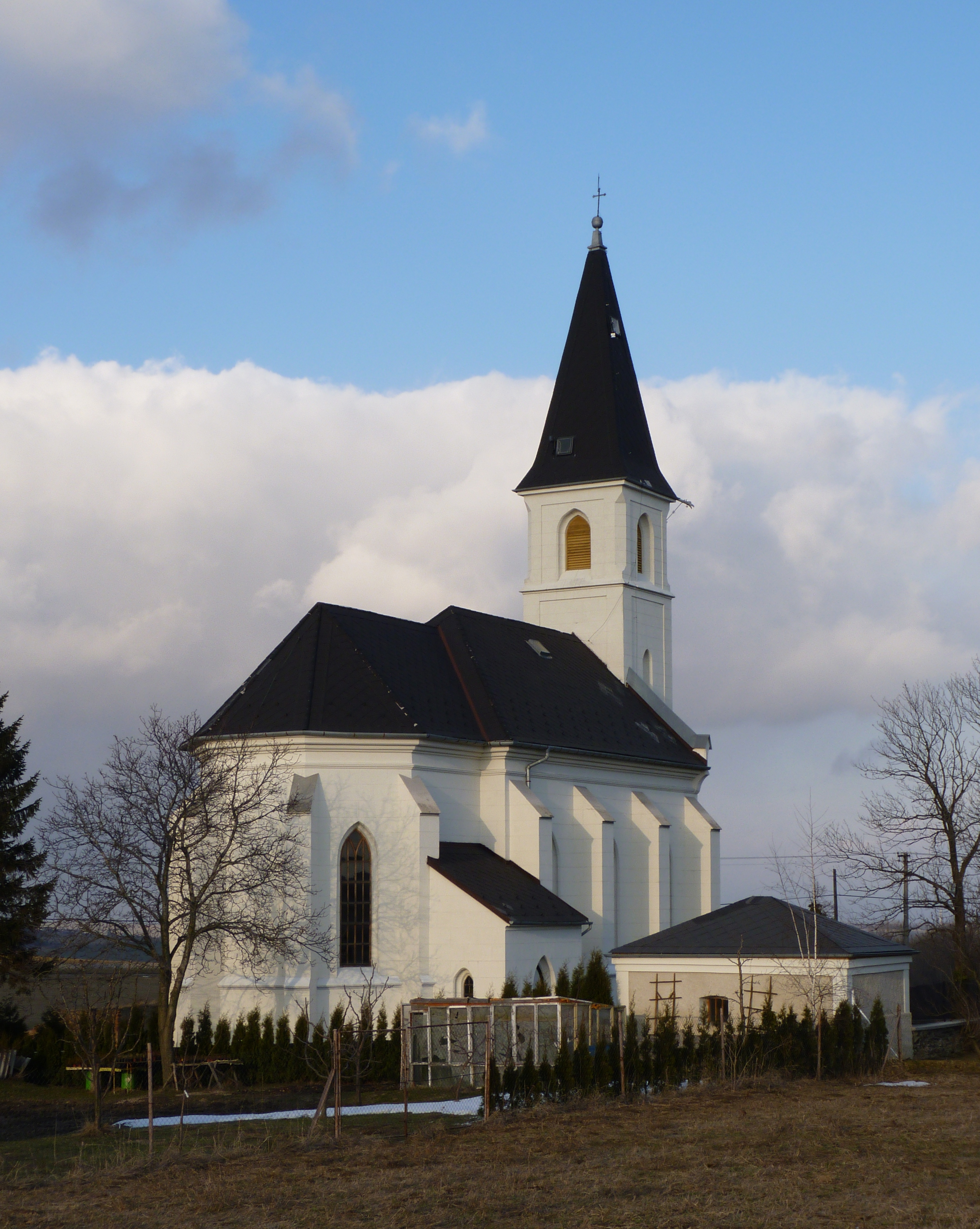
Church of the Holy Redeemer in Úblo

The main landmark of Brumovice is the Church of the Nativity of the Virgin Mary. It was built in the late Baroque style in 1783–1784, on the site of an older church.

The Church of the Holy Redeemer is located in Úblo. It is a neo-Gothic building from 1901.

== Notable people ==
- Libor Kozák (born 1989), footballer
