= Wilków, Namysłów County =

Wilków
- Village
- Location within Poland
- Coordinates: 51°7′N 17°40′E
- Country: Poland
- Voivodeship: Opole
- County: Namysłów
- Gmina: Wilków
- Population: 900

Wilków [ˈvilkuf] is a village in Namysłów County, Opole Voivodeship, in south-western Poland. It is the seat of the gmina (administrative district) called Gmina Wilków, which acquired its current borders after the administrative reforms of the country in 1973.

The history of the surrounding areas can be dates as far back as the second half of the 10th century, when the lands belonged to the Piast dynasty.
