= Jablonka =

Jablonka may refer to:

- Eva Jablonka (born 1952), Israeli biologist
- Jablonka, Myjava, a village in Slovakia

== See also ==
- Jabłonka (disambiguation), several places in Poland
