= Dębnik, Opole Voivodeship =

Dębnik
- Village
- Location within Poland
- Coordinates: 51°05′05″N 17°38′20″E
- Country: Poland
- Voivodeship: Opole
- County: Namysłów
- Gmina: Wilków

Dębnik [ˈdɛmbnik] is a village in the administrative district of Gmina Wilków, within Namysłów County, Opole Voivodeship, in south-western Poland.
