= Niekazanice =

- Village
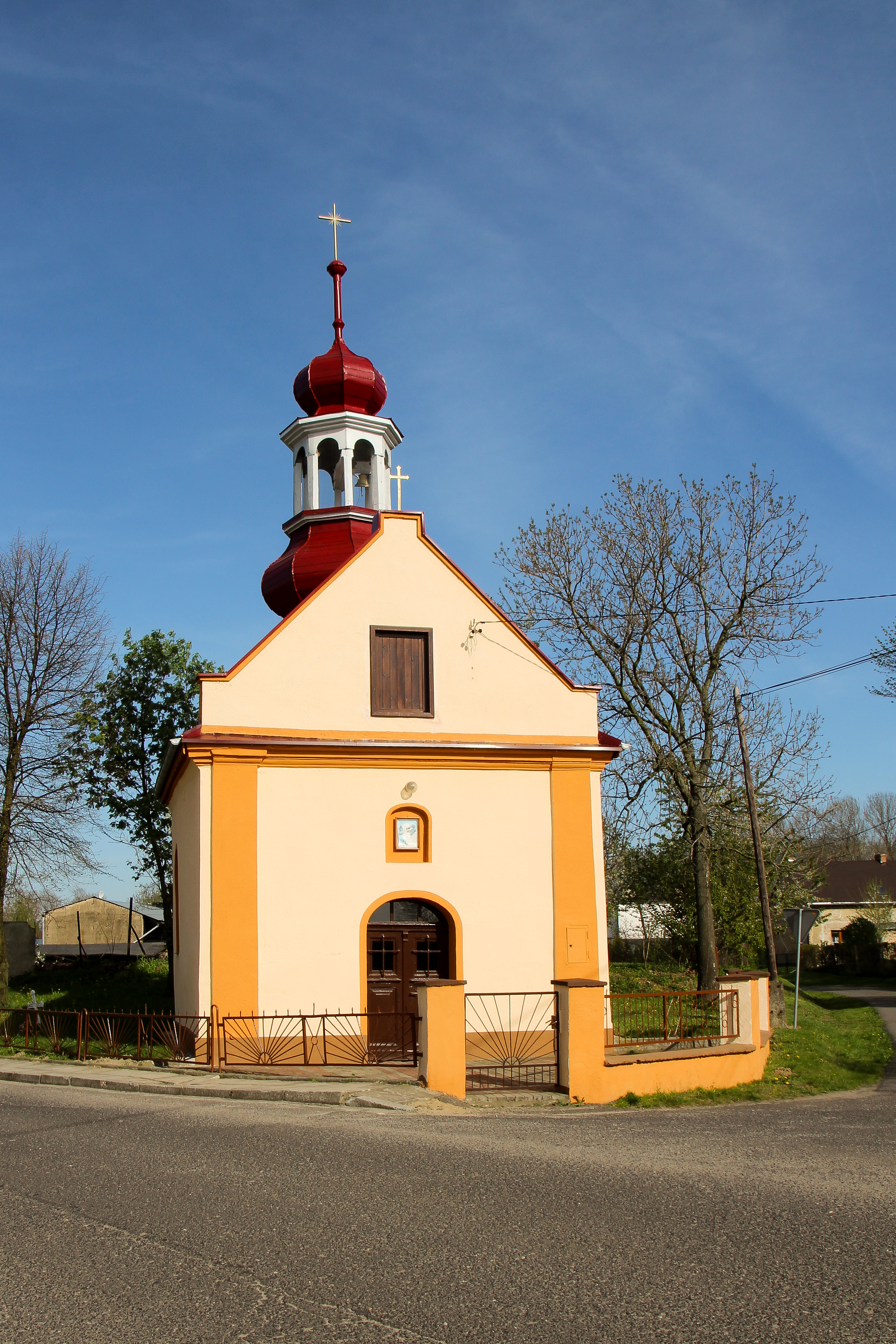

- Location within Poland
- Coordinates: 50°2′49″N 17°51′40″E
- Country: Poland
- Voivodeship: Opole
- County: Głubczyce
- Gmina: Branice

Niekazanice ([ɲɛkazaˈnit͡sɛ]) is a village in the administrative district of Gmina Branice, within Głubczyce County, Opole Voivodeship, in south-western Poland, near the Czech border.
