= Michałkowice, Opole Voivodeship =

Michałkowice
- Village
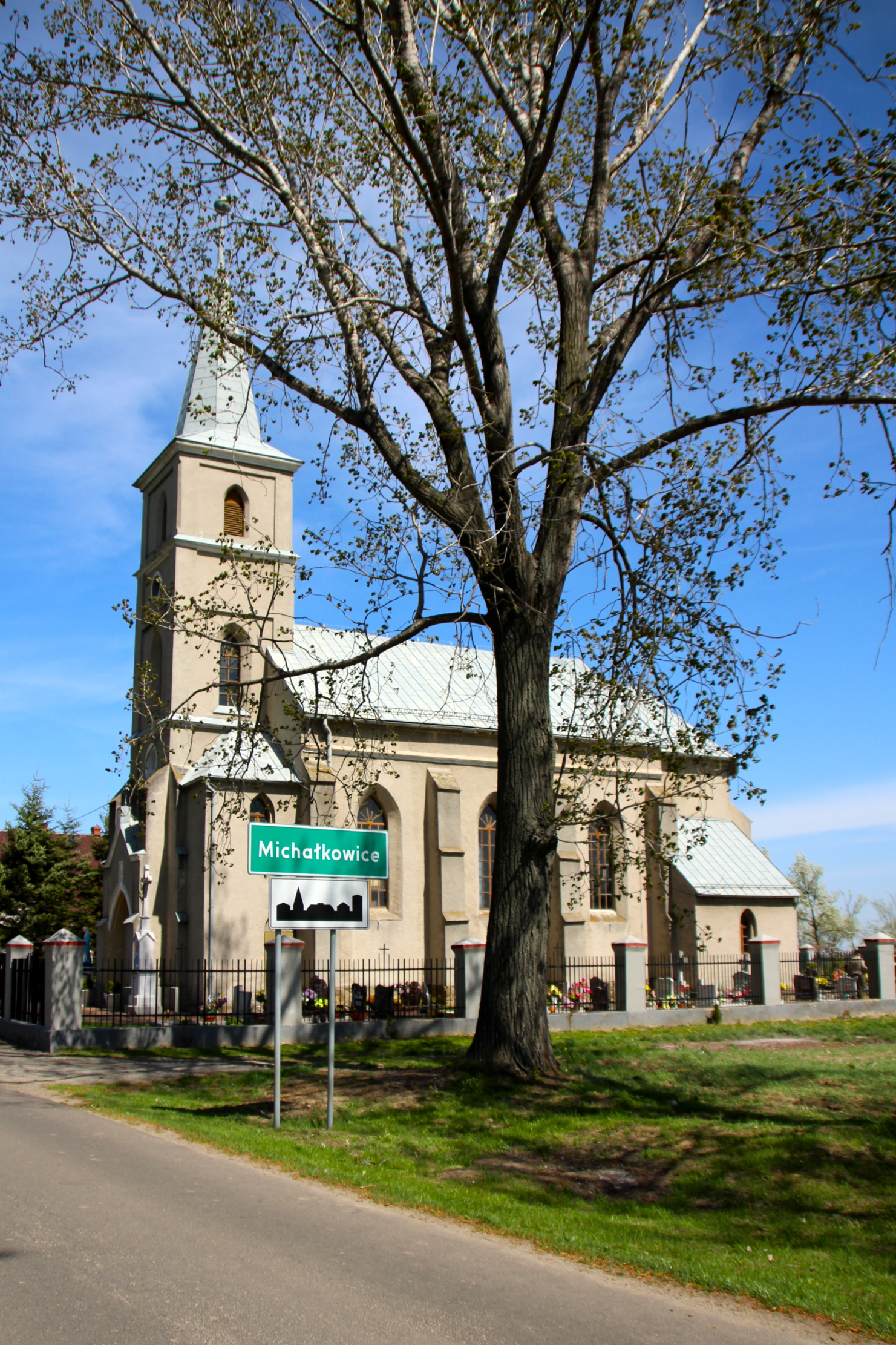
- Church of Saint Joseph

- Location within Poland
- Coordinates: 50°4′40″N 17°47′42″E
- Country: Poland
- Voivodeship: Opole
- County: Głubczyce
- Gmina: Branice

Population
  - Total: 190

Michałkowice [mixau̯kɔˈvit͡sɛ] (German: Michelsdorf) is a village in the administrative district of Gmina Branice, within Głubczyce County, Opole Voivodeship, in south-western Poland, close to the Czech border.
