= Dzbańce-Osiedle =

- Village
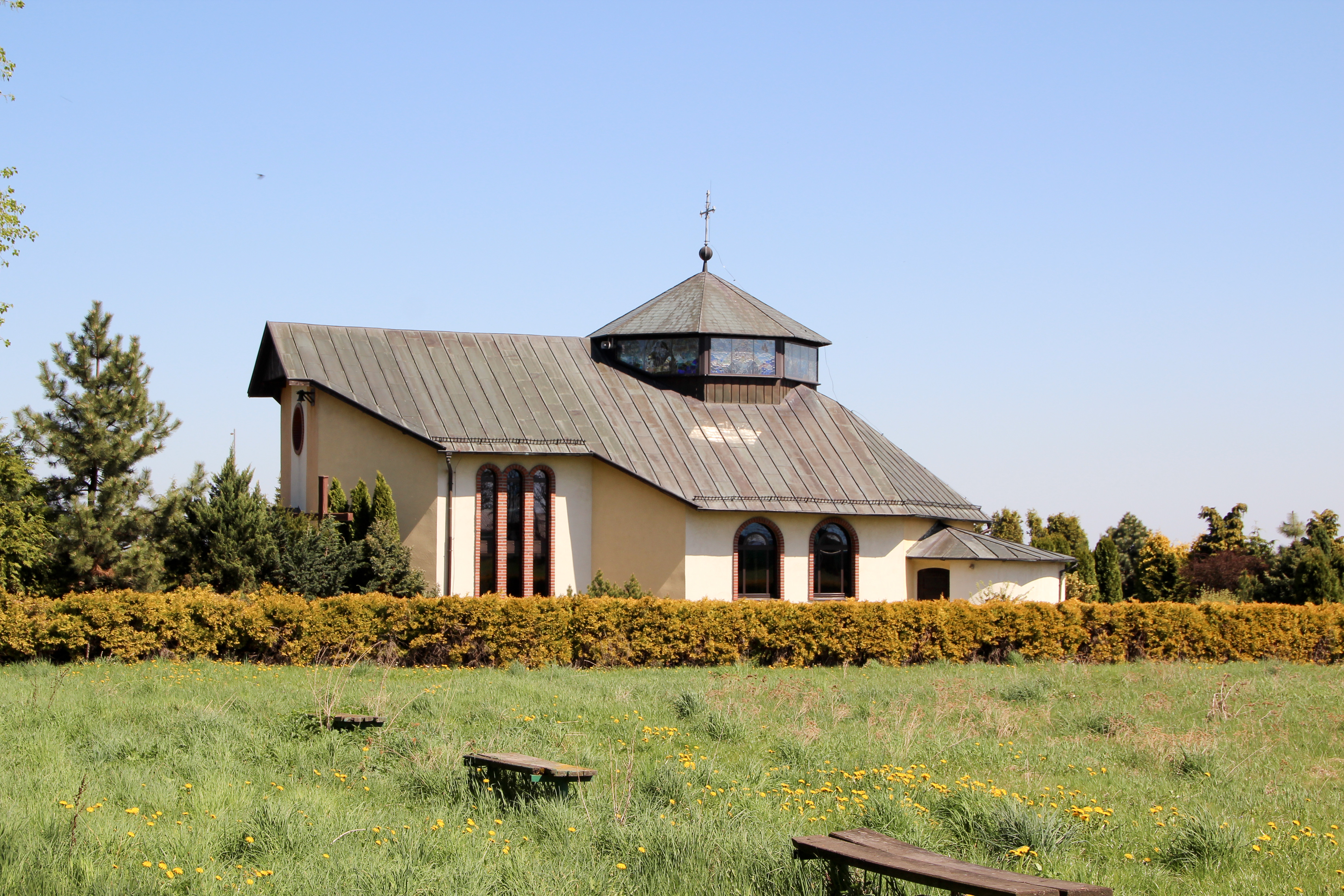

- Location within Poland
- Coordinates: 50°4′49″N 17°50′51″E
- Country: Poland
- Voivodeship: Opole
- County: Głubczyce
- Gmina: Branice
- Population: 360

Dzbańce-Osiedle [ˈd͡zbaɲt͡sɛ ɔˈɕɛdlɛ] is a village in the administrative district of Gmina Branice, within Głubczyce County, Opole Voivodeship, in south-western Poland, close to the Czech border.
