= Bukowie, Opole Voivodeship =

Bukowie
- Village
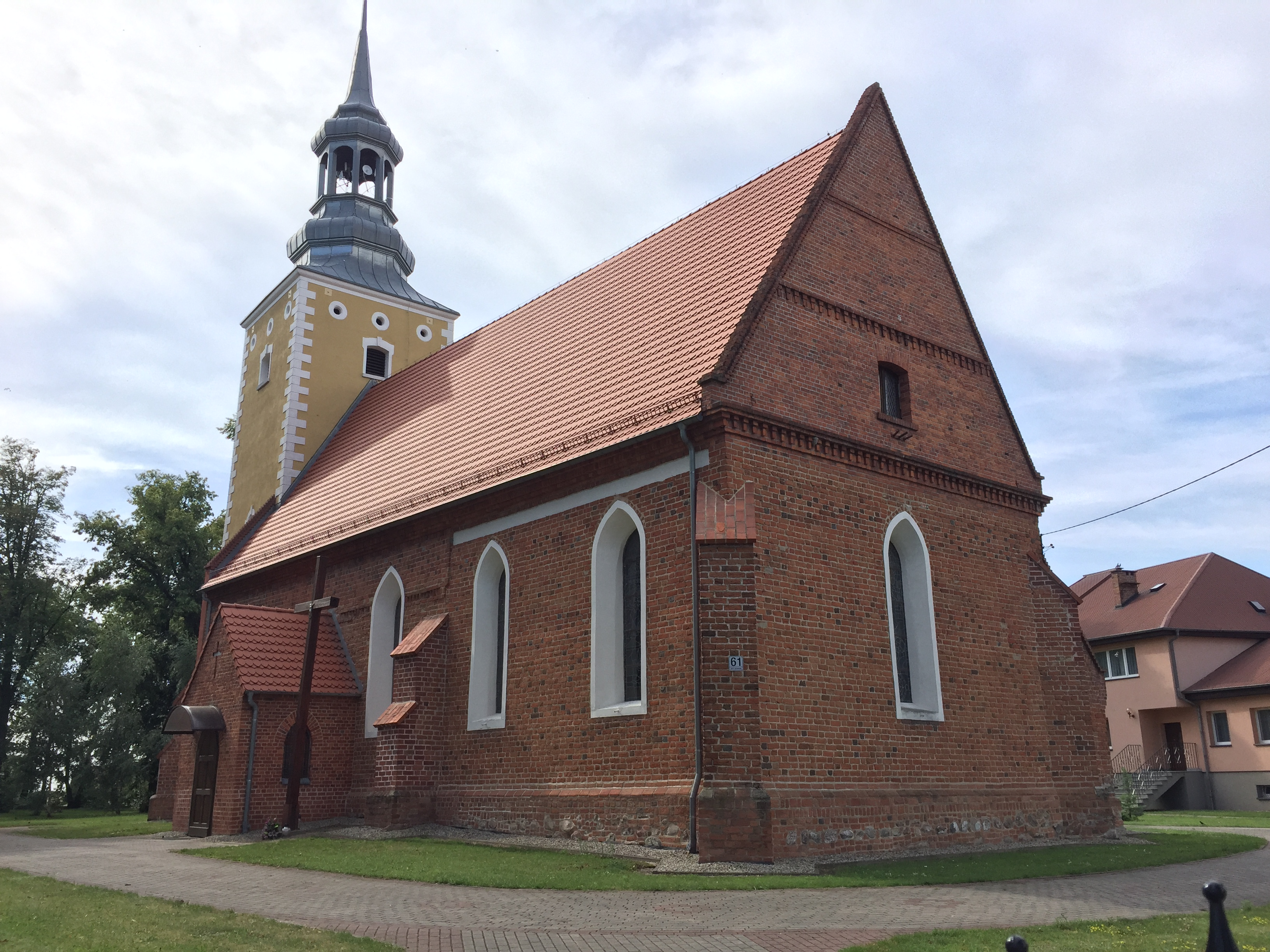
- Purification of Blessed Virgin Mary church in Bukowie

- Location within Poland
- Coordinates: 51°9′N 17°34′E
- Country: Poland
- Voivodeship: Opole
- County: Namysłów
- Gmina: Wilków
- Time zone: UTC+1 (CET)
  - Summer (DST): UTC+2 (CEST)
- Vehicle registration: ONA

Bukowie [buˈkɔvjɛ] is a village in the administrative district of Gmina Wilków, within Namysłów County, Opole Voivodeship, in south-western Poland.
