= Młokicie =

- Village
- Location within Poland
- Coordinates: 51°6′N 17°35′E
- Country: Poland
- Voivodeship: Opole
- County: Namysłów
- Gmina: Wilków

Młokicie [mwɔˈkit͡ɕɛ] is a village in the administrative district of Gmina Wilków, within Namysłów County, Opole Voivodeship, in south-western Poland.
