= Idzikowice, Opole Voivodeship =

Idzikowice
- Village
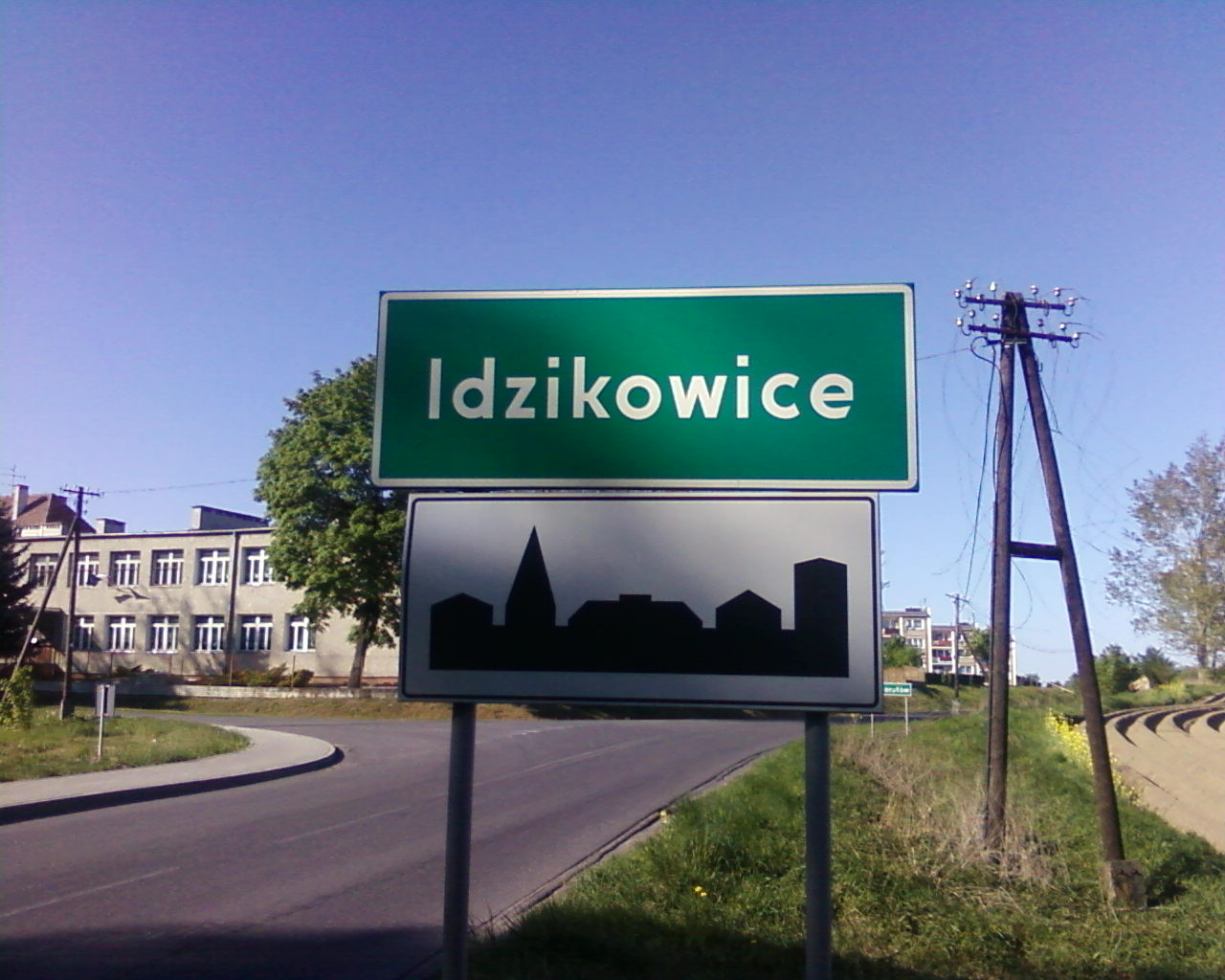
- Idzikowice road sign

- Location within Poland
- Coordinates: 51°9′N 17°41′E
- Country: Poland
- Voivodeship: Opole
- County: Namysłów
- Gmina: Wilków

Idzikowice [id͡ʑikɔˈvit͡sɛ] is a village in the administrative district of Gmina Wilków, within Namysłów County, Opole Voivodeship, in south-western Poland.
