= Yakubovich =

Yakubovich is a patronymic surname derived from the name Yakub (Russian or Belarusian: Якуб, Polish: Jakub) being a version of the name Jacob. The Polish language spelling of the same surname is Jakubowicz. The surname may refer to:

- Denis Yakubovich (born 1988), Belarusian football player
- Joyce Yakubowich (born 1953), Canadian sprinter
- Leonid Yakubovich (born 1945), Russian television personality and actor
  - 5994 Yakubovich, an asteroid named after Leonid
- Pavel Yakubovich (born 1946), Belarusian journalist and state propagandist
- Michael Yakubovich, American politician
- Nadezhda Yakubovich (born 1954), Belarusian Soviet javelin thrower
- Pyotr Yakubovich (1860–1911), Russian revolutionary poet
- Vladimir Yakubovich (1926–2012), Soviet scientist
  - Kalman–Yakubovich–Popov lemma
