= Wojciechów, Namysłów County =

Wojciechów
- Village
- Location within Poland
- Coordinates: 51°6′57″N 17°37′11″E
- Country: Poland
- Voivodeship: Opole
- County: Namysłów
- Gmina: Wilków
- Population: 327

Wojciechów (Polish: [vɔjˈt͡ɕɛxuf]) is a village in the administrative district of Gmina Wilków, within Namysłów County, Opole Voivodeship, in south-western Poland.
