= Krzyków, Opole Voivodeship =

Krzyków
- Village

- Location within Poland
- Coordinates: 51°07′11″N 17°42′43″E
- Country: Poland
- Voivodeship: Opole
- County: Namysłów
- Gmina: Wilków

Krzyków [ˈkʂɨkuf] is a village in the administrative district of Gmina Wilków, within Namysłów County, Opole Voivodeship, in south-western Poland.
