= Lewice, Opole Voivodeship =

Lewice
- Village
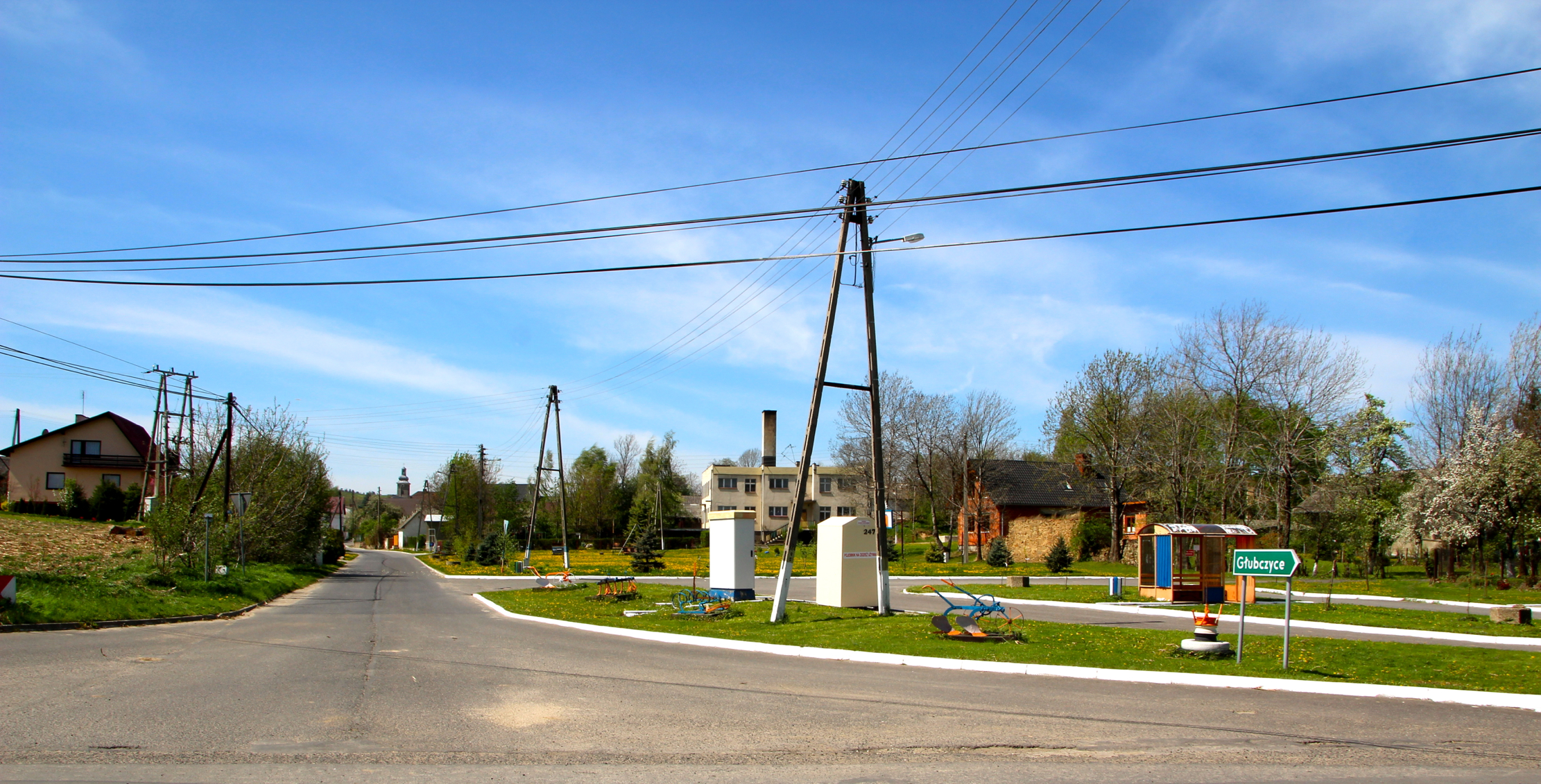

- Location within Poland
- Coordinates: 50°6′N 17°47′E
- Country: Poland
- Voivodeship: Opole
- County: Głubczyce
- Gmina: Branice
- Time zone: UTC+1 (CET)
  - Summer (DST): UTC+2 (CEST)
- Vehicle registration: OGL

Lewice [lɛˈvit͡sɛ] (German: Löwitz) is a village in the administrative district of Gmina Branice, within Głubczyce County, Opole Voivodeship, in southern Poland, close to the Czech border.

== Etymology ==
The name is of Polish origin, and comes from either the word łowić, which means "to hunt" or from the name of supposed founder Lew (Old Polish variant of the name Leon).
