= Branice =

- Town
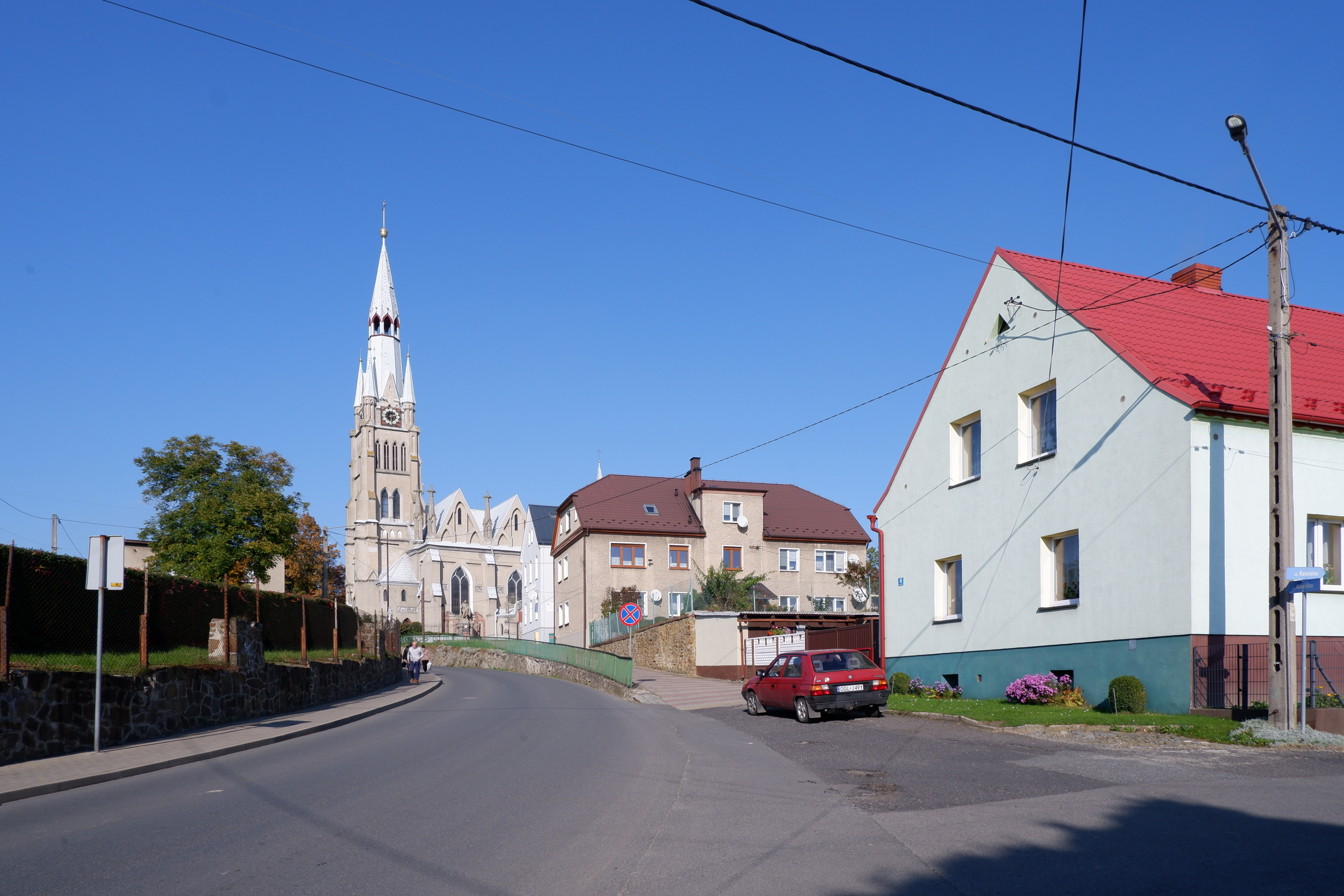
- Branice

- Location within Poland
- Coordinates: 50°3′5″N 17°47′41″E
- Country: Poland
- Voivodeship: Opole
- County: Głubczyce
- Gmina: Branice

Government
  - Vogt: Józef Małek

Population (2022)
  - Total: 1,996
- Time zone: UTC+1 (CET)
  - Summer (DST): UTC+2 (CEST)
- Postal code: 48-140
- Area code: +48 77
- Car plates: OGL

Branice [braˈnit͡sɛ] (German: Branitz) is a town located in the Opole Voivodeship, in southern Poland, near the border with the Czech Republic. It belongs to Głubczyce County and is the seat of Gmina Branice. It has about 2,000 inhabitants.
