= Dobieszów, Głubczyce County =

Dobieszów
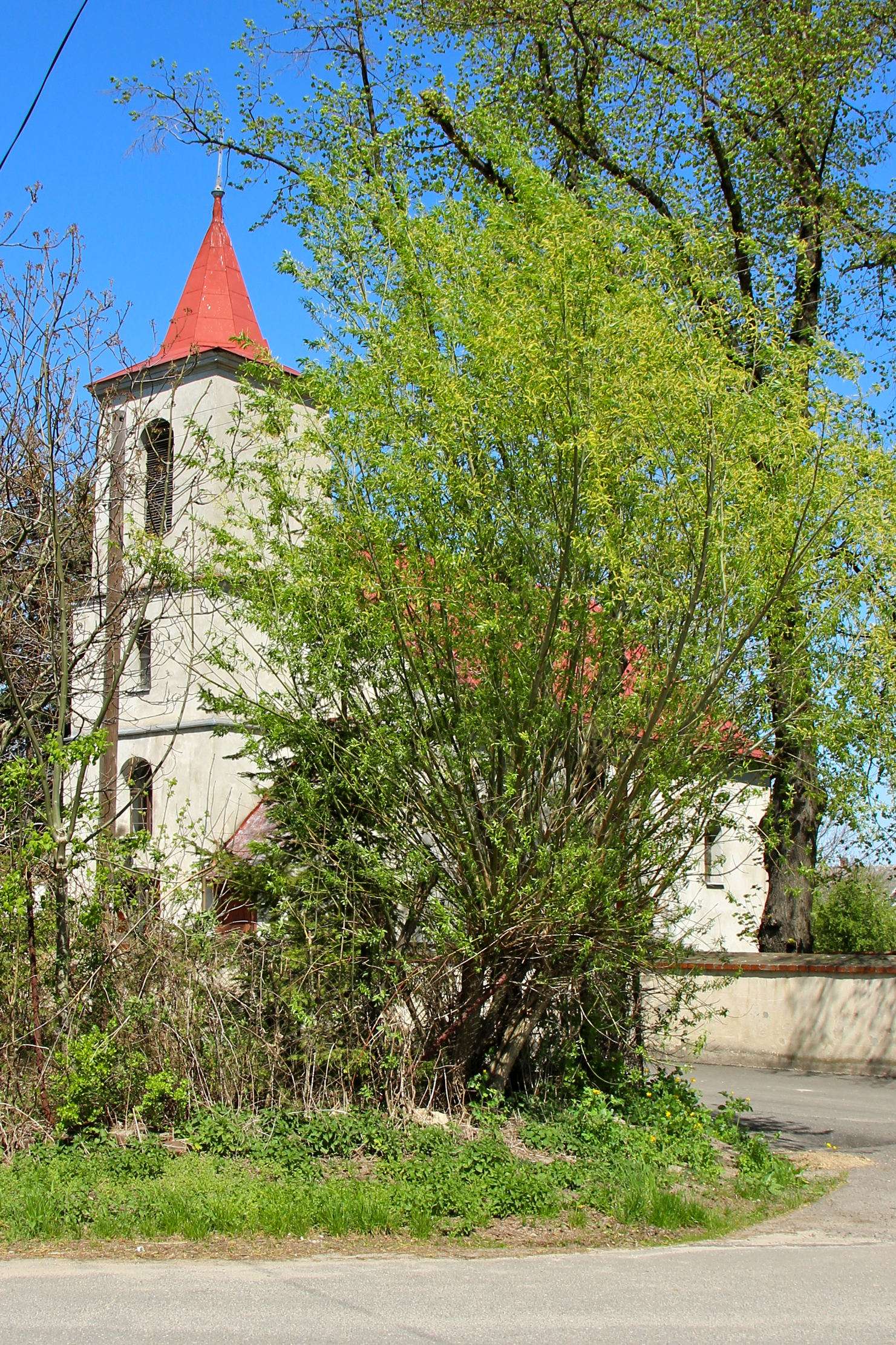

- Location within Poland
- Coordinates: 50°10′N 17°42′E
- Country: Poland
- Voivodeship: Opole
- County: Głubczyce
- Gmina: Głubczyce
- Time zone: UTC+1 (CET)
  - Summer (DST): UTC+2 (CEST)
- Area code: +48 77
- Vehicle registration: OGL

Dobieszów [dɔˈbjɛʂuf] (Czech: Dobešovy) is a village in southern Poland, in the Opole Voivodeship, Głubczyce County and Gmina Głubczyce.

== Etymology ==
It was noted under the Polish name Dobieszowy in Konstanty Damrot's work on the origins of place names in Silesia from 1896. The name is derived from the Old Polish male name Dobiesław.
