= Jakubowice, Głubczyce County =

Jakubowice
- Village
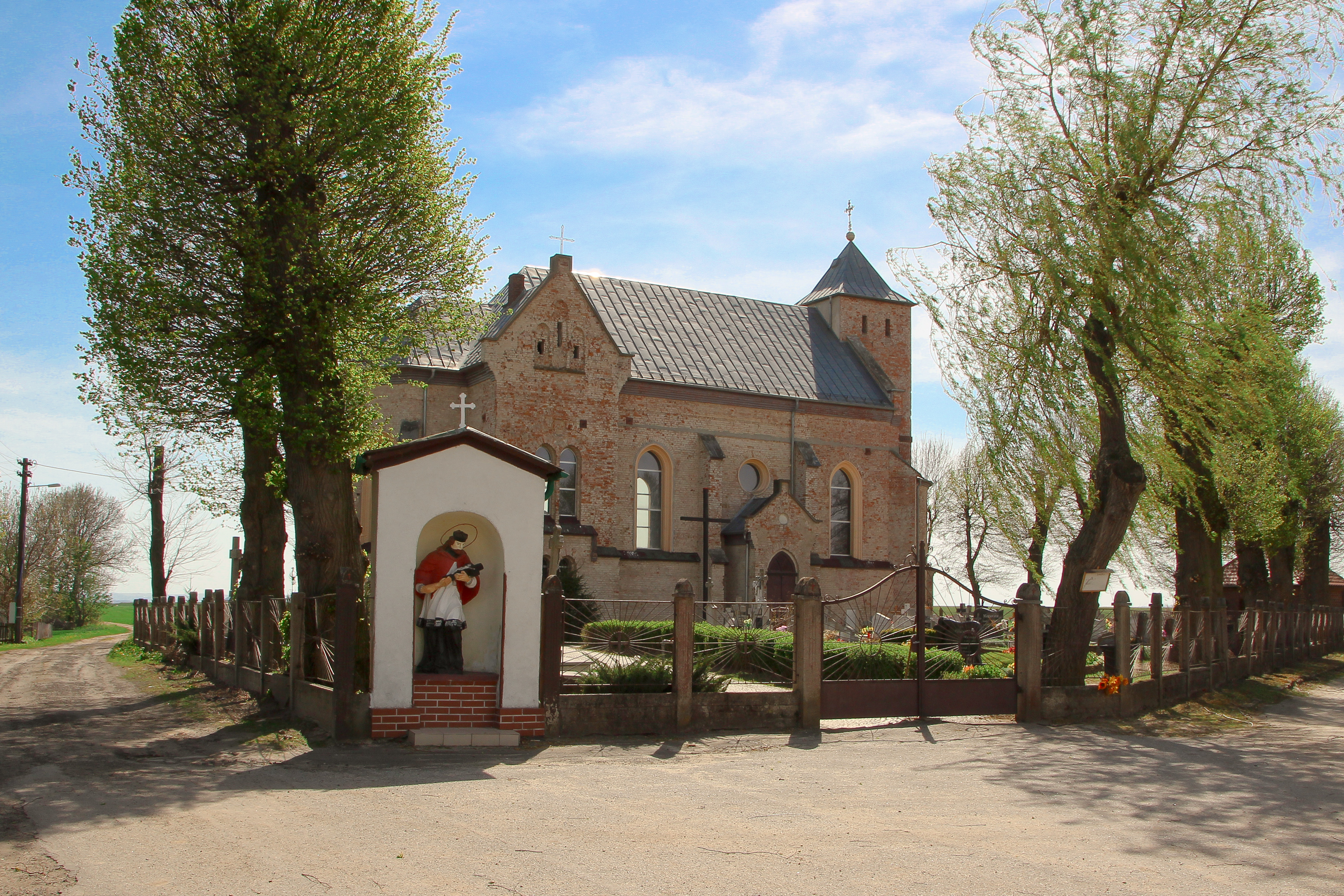
- Saint Anna church.

- Location within Poland
- Coordinates: 50°1′15″N 17°51′0″E
- Country: Poland
- Voivodeship: Opole
- County: Głubczyce
- Gmina: Branice
- Population: 140

Jakubowice (German Jakubowitz, 1936–1945 Jakobsfelde, Czech Jakubovice) [jakubɔˈvit͡sɛ] is a village in the administrative district of Gmina Branice, within Głubczyce County, Opole Voivodeship, in south-western Poland, close to the Czech border.
