= Włodzienin =

- Village
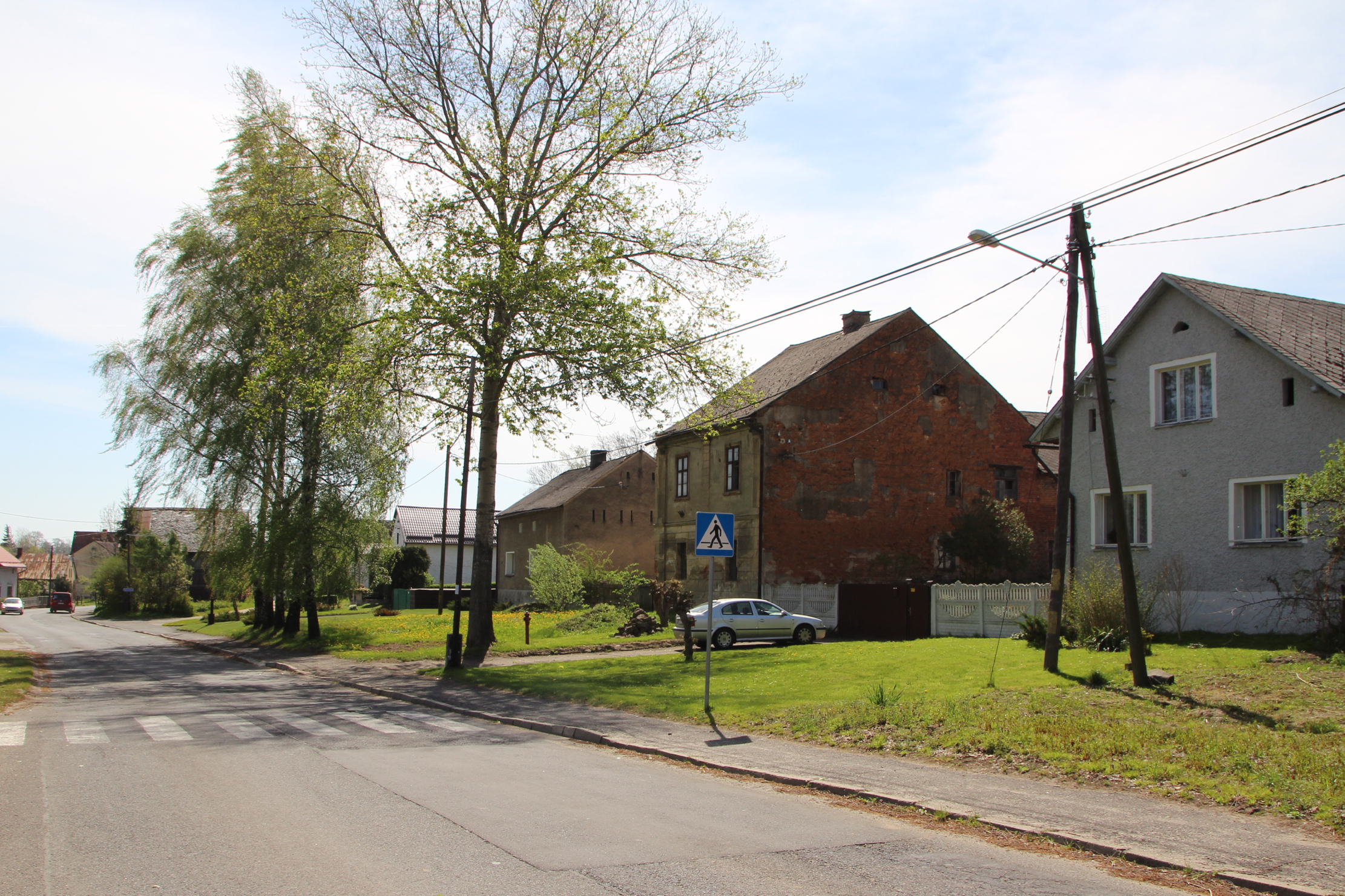

- Location within Poland
- Coordinates: 50°7′N 17°50′E
- Country: Poland
- Voivodeship: Opole
- County: Głubczyce
- Gmina: Branice

Włodzienin [vwɔˈd͡ʑɛnin] (German Bladen) is a village in the administrative district of Gmina Branice, within Głubczyce County, Opole Voivodeship, in south-western Poland, close to the Czech border.

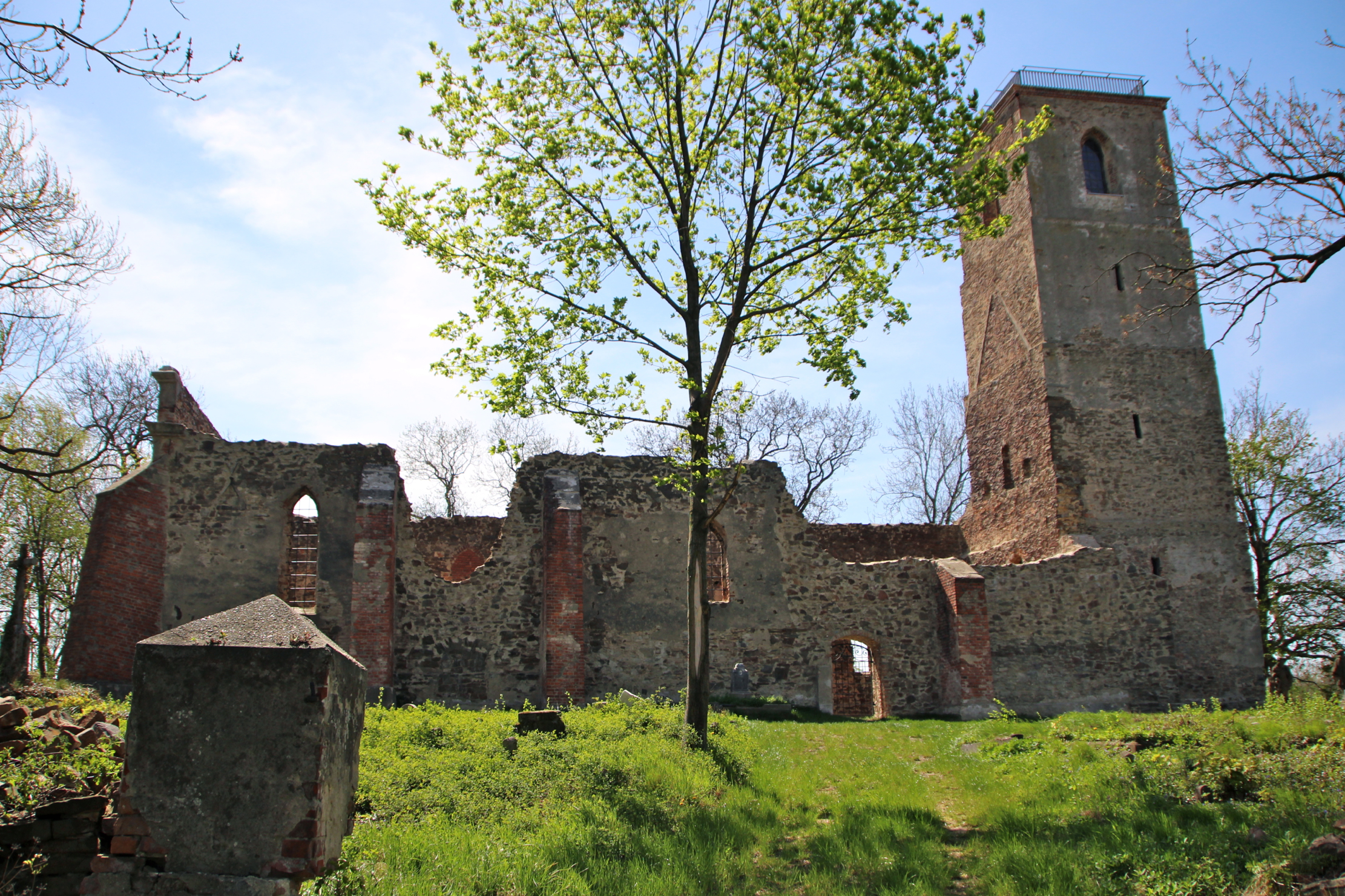
Ruin of the saint Michael church
