= Jakubowice, Namysłów County =

Jakubowice
- Village
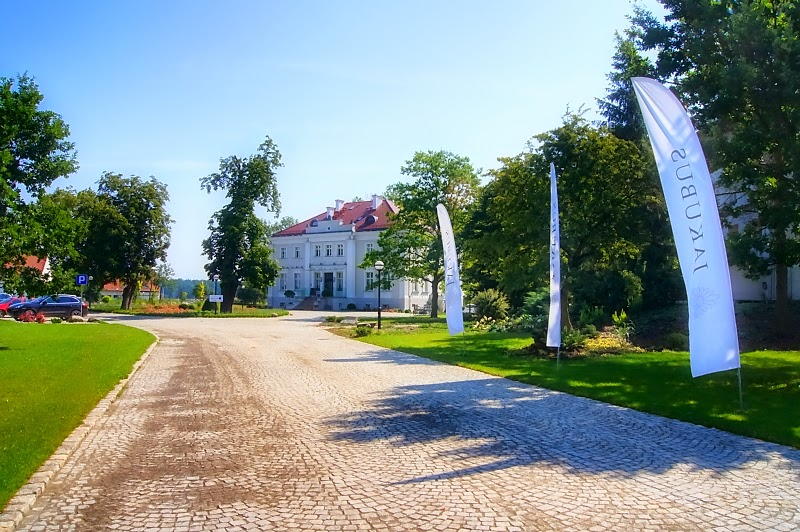
- Palace in Jakubowice

- Location within Poland
- Coordinates: 51°08′17″N 17°42′03″E
- Country: Poland
- Voivodeship: Opole
- County: Namysłów
- Gmina: Wilków

Jakubowice [jakubɔˈvit͡sɛ] is a village in the administrative district of Gmina Wilków, within Namysłów County, Opole Voivodeship, in south-western Poland.
