= Pielgrzymowice, Opole Voivodeship =

Pielgrzymowice
- Village
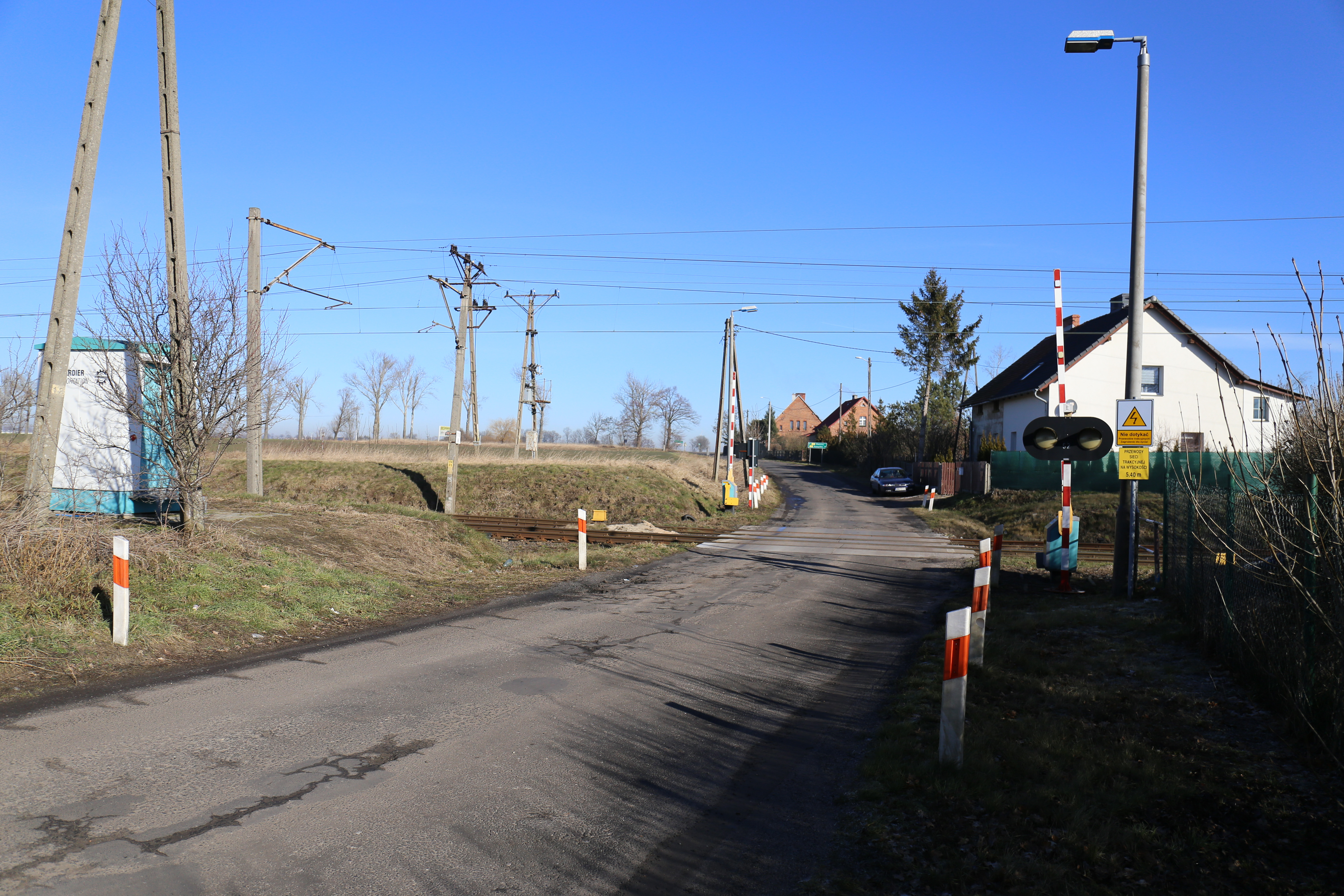

- Location within Poland
- Coordinates: 51°06′51″N 17°35′02″E
- Country: Poland
- Voivodeship: Opole
- County: Namysłów
- Gmina: Wilków
- Time zone: UTC+1 (CET)
  - Summer (DST): UTC+2 (CEST)
- Vehicle registration: ONA

Pielgrzymowice [pjɛlɡʐɨmɔˈvit͡sɛ] is a village in the administrative district of Gmina Wilków, within Namysłów County, Opole Voivodeship, in south-western Poland.
