= Jabłonka, Opole Voivodeship =

Jabłonka
- Village
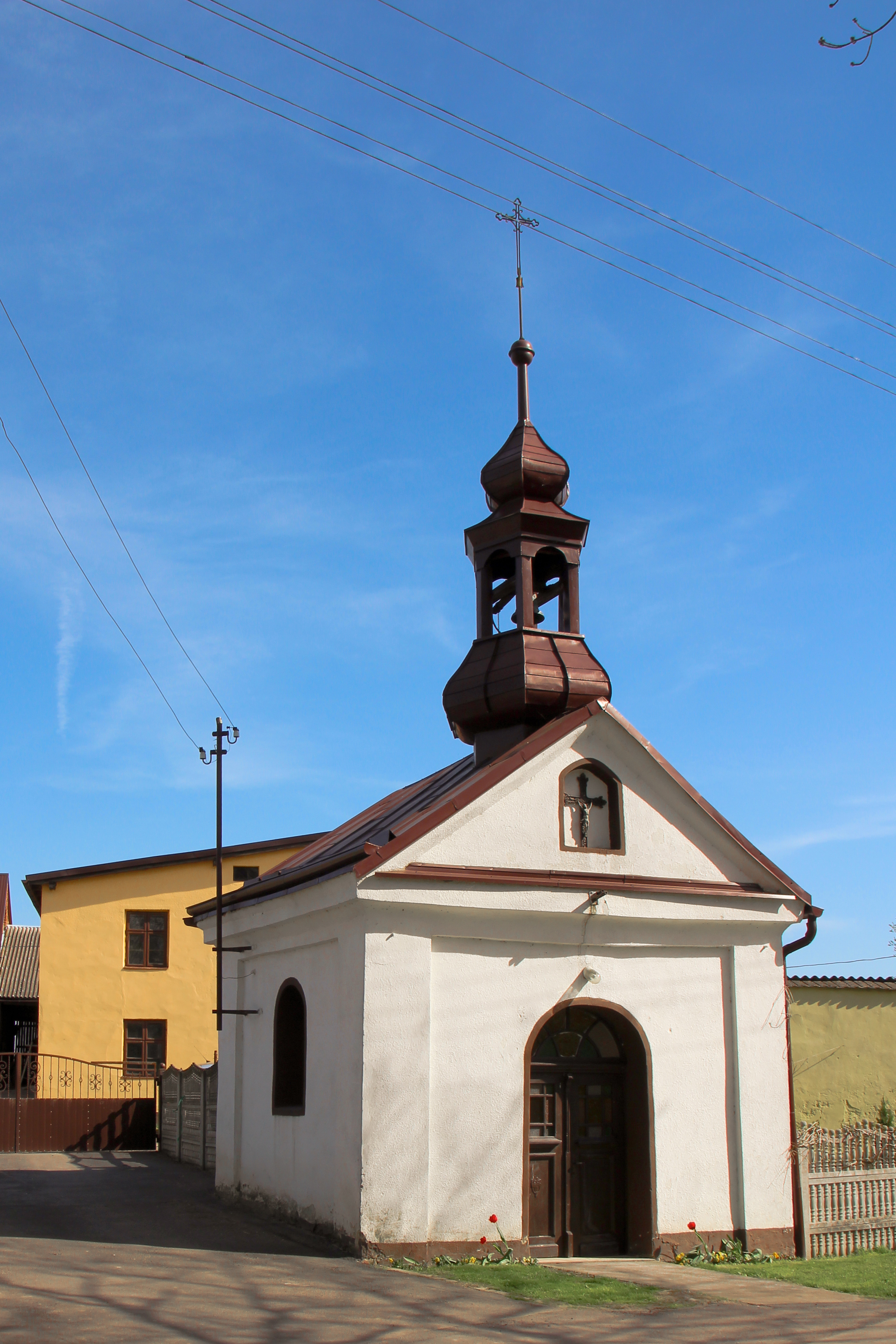

- Location within Poland
- Coordinates: 50°1′2″N 17°53′6″E
- Country: Poland
- Voivodeship: Opole
- County: Głubczyce
- Gmina: Branice
- Population: 50

Jabłonka [jaˈbwɔnka] is a village in the administrative district of Gmina Branice, within Głubczyce County, Opole Voivodeship, in south-western Poland, close to the Czech border.
