= Lenarcice =

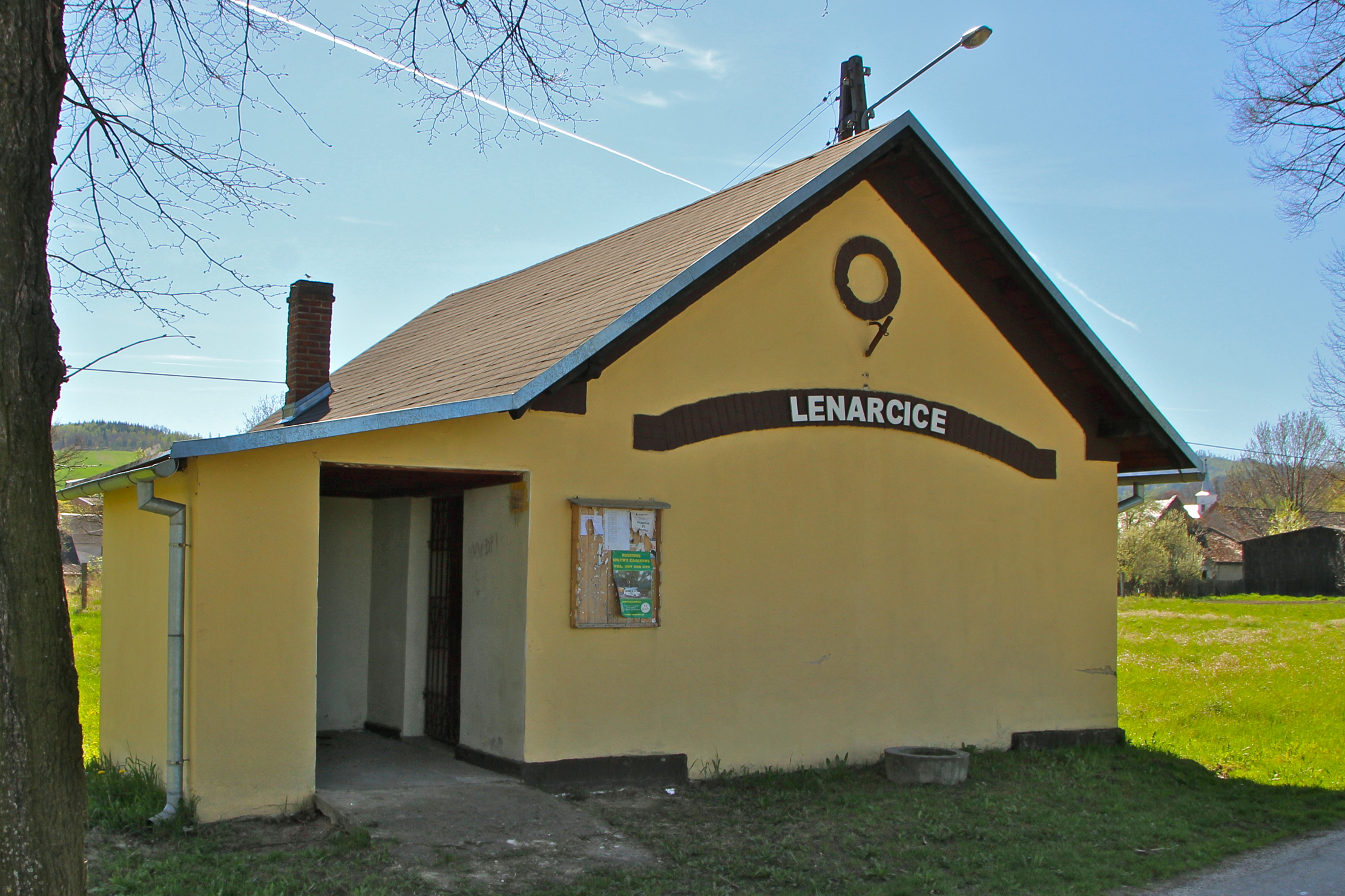

- Location within Poland
- Coordinates: 50°8′8″N 17°37′36″E
- Country: Poland
- Voivodeship: Opole
- County: Głubczyce
- Gmina: Głubczyce
- Time zone: UTC+1 (CET)
  - Summer (DST): UTC+2 (CEST)
- Postal code: 48-100
- Area code: +48 77
- Car plates: OGL

Lenarcice [lɛnarˈt͡ɕit͡sɛ] is a village located in Poland, in the Opole Voivodeship, Głubczyce County and Gmina Głubczyce.
