= Gmina Wilków, Opole Voivodeship =

Gmina Wilków Wilków Commune
- Gmina
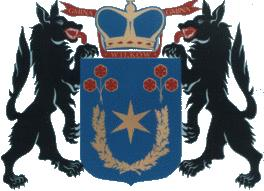
- Flag Coat of arms
- Interactive map of Gmina Wilków
- Coordinates (Wilków): 51°7′N 17°40′E
- Country: Poland
- Voivodeship: Opole
- County: Namysłów
- Seat: Wilków

Area
  - Total: 100.57 km^{2} (38.83 sq mi)

Population (2019-06-30)
  - Total: 4,411
  - Density: 43.86/km^{2} (113.6/sq mi)
- Website: https://www.wilkow.pl

Gmina Wilków is a rural gmina (administrative district) in Namysłów County, Opole Voivodeship, in south-western Poland. Its seat is the village of Wilków, which lies approximately 6 kilometres (4 mi) north-west of Namysłów and 54 km (34 mi) north of the regional capital Opole.

The gmina covers an area of 100.57 square kilometres (38.8 sq mi), and as of 2019 its total population is 4,411.

The village of Wilków is littered with ruins of old country-houses belonging to mostly German gentry that lived in the area prior to the second world war.

== Villages ==
Gmina Wilków contains the villages and settlements of Bukowie, Dębnik, Idzikowice, Jakubowice, Krzyków, Lubska, Młokicie, Pągów, Pielgrzymowice, Pszeniczna, Wilków and Wojciechów.

== Neighbouring gminas ==
Gmina Wilków is bordered by the gminas of Bierutów, Dziadowa Kłoda and Namysłów.

== Education ==
Szkola Wikow
