= Posucice =

- Village
- Location within Poland
- Coordinates: 50°4′N 17°49′E
- Country: Poland
- Voivodeship: Opole
- County: Głubczyce
- Gmina: Branice

Posucice [pɔsuˈt͡ɕit͡sɛ] is a village in the administrative district of Gmina Branice, within Głubczyce County, Opole Voivodeship, in south-western Poland, close to the Czech border.
