= Boboluszki =

- Village
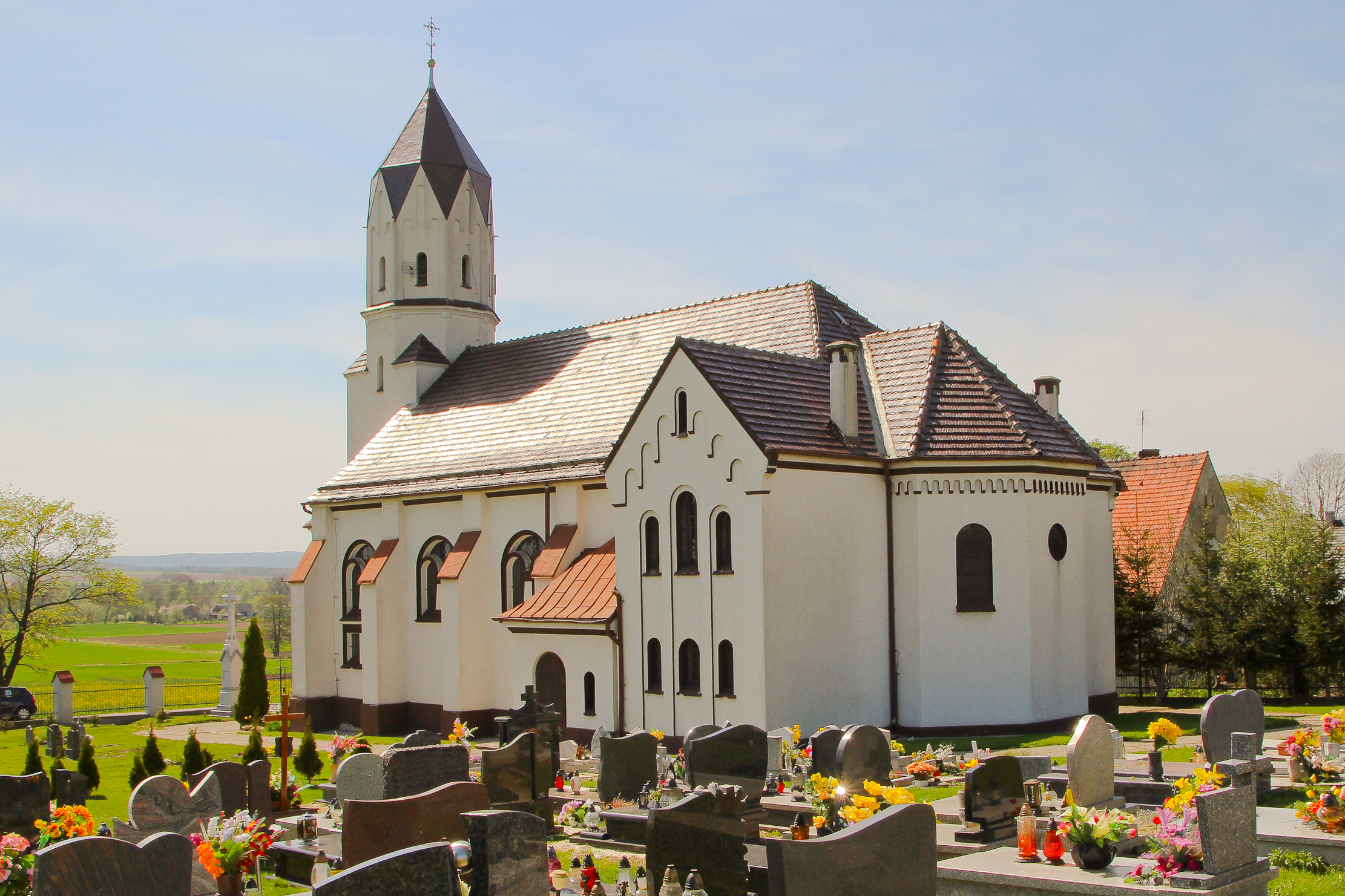

- Location within Poland
- Coordinates: 50°2′N 17°48′E
- Country: Poland
- Voivodeship: Opole
- County: Głubczyce
- Gmina: Branice

Boboluszki [bɔbɔˈluʂki] (Czech Bobolusky, Silesian Boblowicy, German Boblowitz, 1936-1945 Hedwigsgrund) is a village in the administrative district of Gmina Branice, within Głubczyce County, Opole Voivodeship, in south-western Poland, close to the Czech border.
