= Jakubovice =

- Municipality
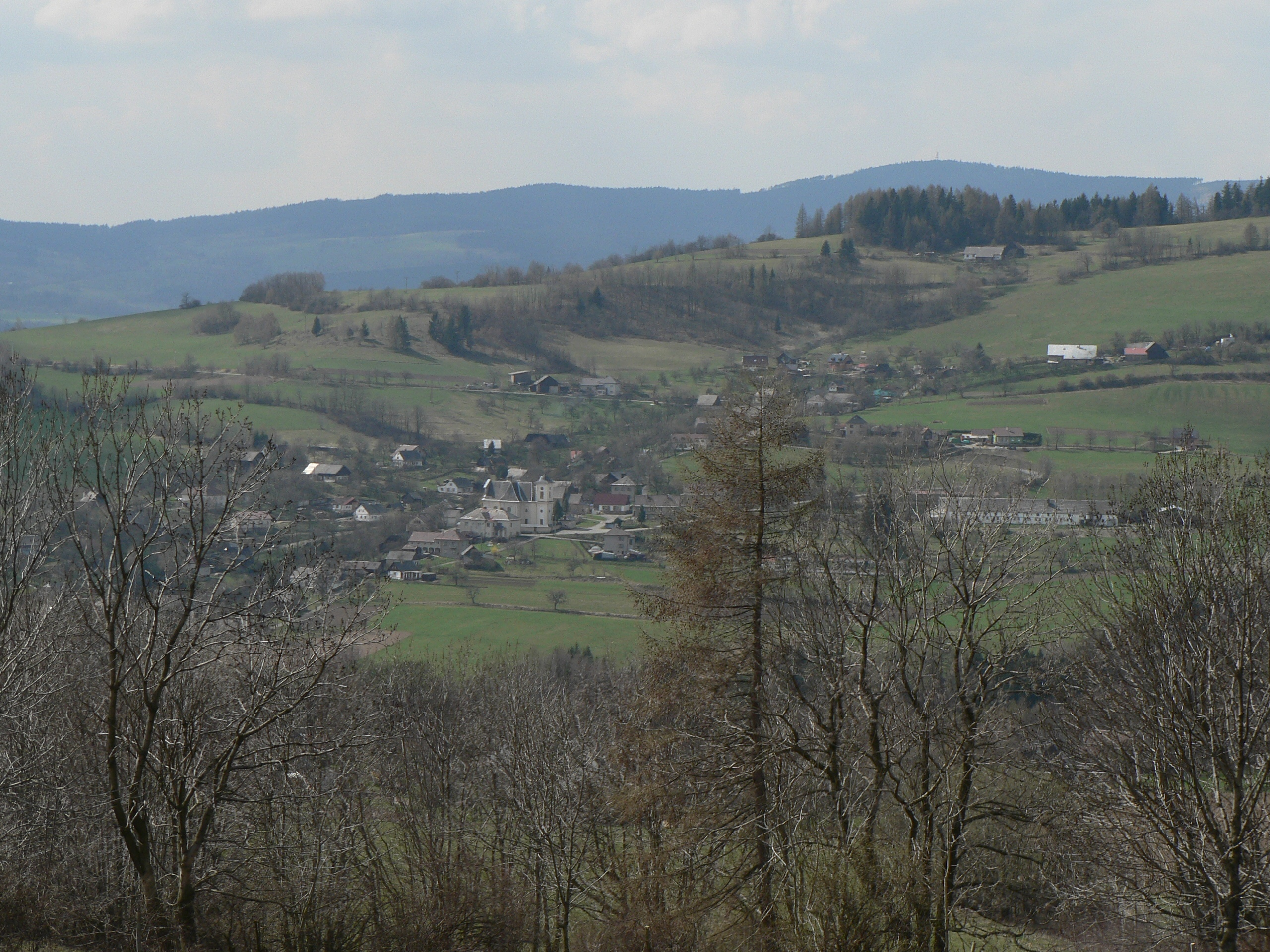
- View from the east

- Flag Coat of arms

- Location in the Czech Republic
- Coordinates: 49°59′40″N 16°49′44″E
- Country: Czech Republic
- Region: Olomouc
- District: Šumperk
- First mentioned: 1351

Area
  - Total: 7.90 km^{2} (3.05 sq mi)
- Elevation: 495 m (1,624 ft)

Population (2026-01-01)
  - Total: 204
  - Density: 25.8/km^{2} (66.9/sq mi)
- Time zone: UTC+1 (CET)
  - Summer (DST): UTC+2 (CEST)
- Postal codes: 789 91
- Website: www.jakubovice.cz

Jakubovice (German: Jokelsdorf) is a municipality and village in Šumperk District in the Olomouc Region of the Czech Republic. It has about 200 inhabitants. The village is well preserved and is protected as a village monument zone.

Jakubovice lies approximately 11 kilometres (7 mi) north-west of Šumperk, 55 km (34 mi) north-west of Olomouc, and 173 km (107 mi) east of Prague.

== Demographics ==
Historical population
Year	Pop.	±%
1869	615	—
1880	582	−5.4%
1890	576	−1.0%
1900	628	+9.0%
1910	586	−6.7%
1921	547	−6.7%
1930	524	−4.2%
1950	290	−44.7%
1961	250	−13.8%
1970	231	−7.6%
1980	207	−10.4%
1991	174	−15.9%
2001	184	+5.7%
2011	203	+10.3%
2021	206	+1.5%
Source: Censuses
