= Karol Jakubowicz =

Polish journalist (1941–2013)

Karol Jakubowicz (died 28 April 2013) was a Polish academic who studied journalism and communication science. He was instrumental in guiding the development of media legislation in eastern Europe in the 1990s.

Appointed by international institutions as an expert in radio and television legislation, he served as the chairman of the Intergovernmental Council of the "Information for All" program at UNESCO and as the chairman of the Steering Committee on Media and New Communication Services of the Council of Europe. He headed the Department of Strategy and Analysis at the National Broadcasting Council.

== Honors and awards ==
In 2011, president Bronisław Komorowski decorated him with the Knight's Cross of the Order of Polonia Restituta.
