= Bliszczyce =

- Village
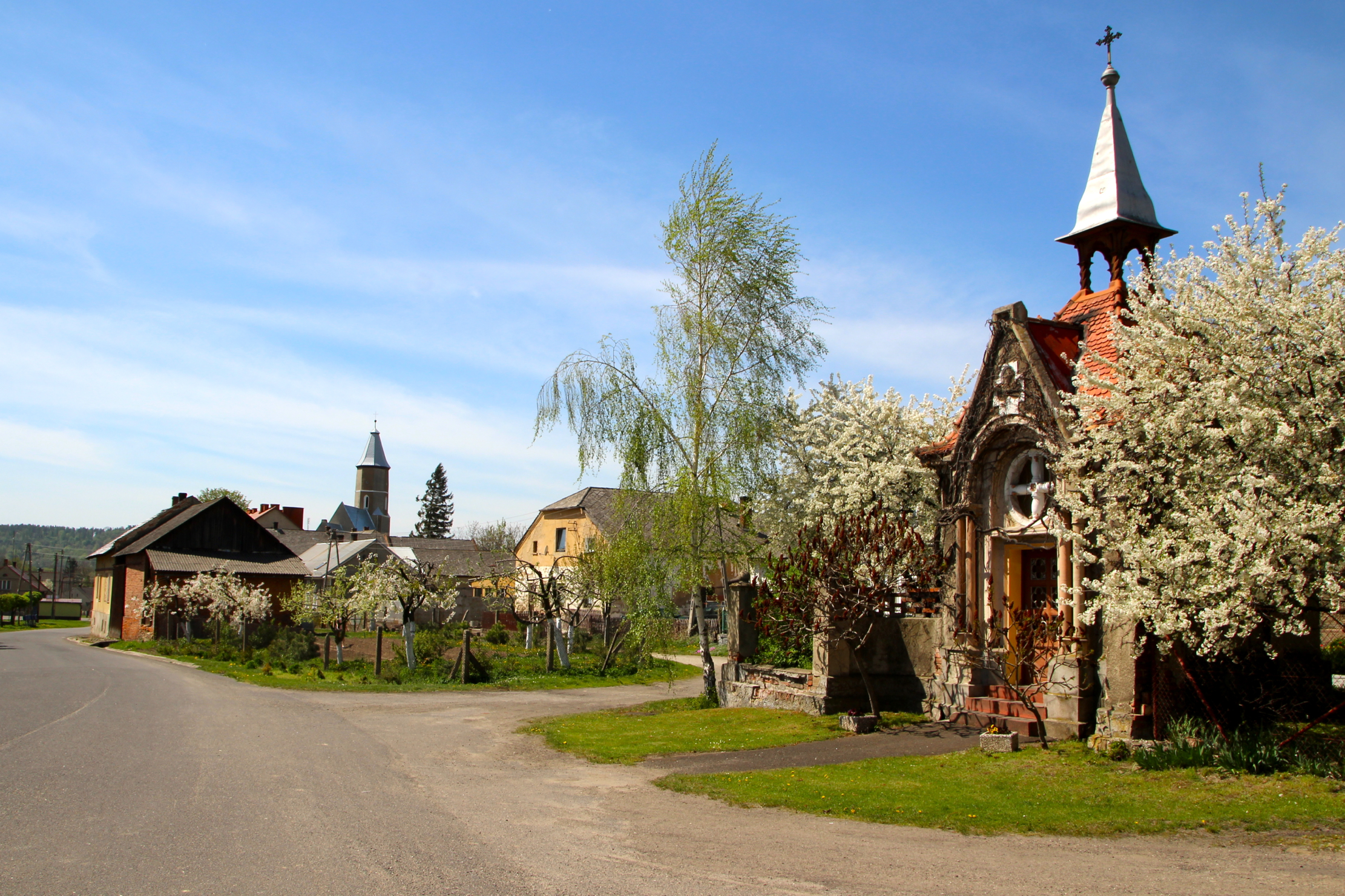

- Location within Poland
- Coordinates: 50°5′N 17°45′E
- Country: Poland
- Voivodeship: Opole
- County: Głubczyce
- Gmina: Branice

Bliszczyce [bliʂˈt͡ʂɨt͡sɛ] is a village in the administrative district of Gmina Branice, within Głubczyce County, Opole Voivodeship, in south-western Poland, close to the Czech border.

In the village, there is a hill Barania Kopa (411.3 metres) which is part of the tourist route Bronisław Juzwiszyn.

== Natives ==
- Alfons Tracki (1896–1946), German priest in Albania
