= Babice =

Babice may refer to places:

== Czech Republic ==
- Babice (Hradec Králové District), a municipality and village in Hradec Králové Region
- Babice (Olomouc District), a municipality and village in Olomouc Region
- Babice (Prachatice District), a municipality and village in South Bohemian Region
- Babice (Prague-East District), a municipality and village in Central Bohemian Region
- Babice (Třebíč District), a municipality and village in Vysočina Region
- Babice (Uherské Hradiště District), a municipality and village in Zlín Region
- Babice, a village and part of Buřenice in the Vysočina Region
- Babice, a village and part of Hostouň (Domažlice District) in the Plzeň Region
- Babice, a village and part of Kbel (Plzeň-South District) in the Plzeň Region
- Babice, a village and part of Kelč in the Zlín Region
- Babice, a village and part of Okrouhlice in the Vysočina Region
- Babice, a hamlet and part of Olbramovice (Benešov District) in the Central Bohemian Region
- Babice, a village and part of Řehenice in the Central Bohemian Region
- Babice, a village and part of Teplá in the Karlovy Vary Region
- Babice nad Svitavou, a municipality and village in South Moravian Region
- Babice u Rosic, a municipality and village in South Moravian Region

== Poland ==
- Babice, Lublin Voivodeship (east Poland)
- Babice, Łódź Voivodeship (central Poland)
- Babice, Chrzanów County in Lesser Poland Voivodeship (south Poland)
- Babice, Opole Voivodeship (south-west Poland)
- Babice, Oświęcim County in Lesser Poland Voivodeship (south Poland)
- Babice, Subcarpathian Voivodeship (south-east Poland)
- Babice, Masovian Voivodeship (east-central Poland)
- Babice, Silesian Voivodeship (south Poland)
