= Kyjov (disambiguation) =

Kyjov is a town in the South Moravian Region, Czech Republic.

Kyjov may also refer to places:

== Czech Republic ==
- Kyjov (Havlíčkův Brod District), a municipality and village in the Vysočina Region
- Kyjov (Žďár nad Sázavou District), a municipality and village in the Vysočina Region
- Kyjov, a village and part of Buřenice in the Vysočina Region
- Kyjov, a village and part of Krásná Lípa in the Ústí nad Labem Region
- Kyjov, a village and part of Zadní Chodov in the Plzeň Region
- Kyjov Hills, a nature region in the South Moravian Region

== Slovakia ==
- Kyjov, Stará Ľubovňa District, a village in the Prešov Region
