= Wierzbno (disambiguation) =

Wierzbno is a neighbourhood in Warsaw, Poland.

Wierzbno may also refer to:

- Wierzbno, Lower Silesian Voivodeship (south-west Poland)
- Wierzbno, Lesser Poland Voivodeship (south Poland)
- Wierzbno, Węgrów County in Masovian Voivodeship (east-central Poland)
- Wierzbno, Gmina Odolanów, Ostrów County in Greater Poland Voivodeship (west-central Poland)
- Wierzbno, Słupca County in Greater Poland Voivodeship (west-central Poland)
- Wierzbno, Lubusz Voivodeship (west Poland)
- Wierzbno, Głubczyce County in Opole Voivodeship (south-west Poland)
- Wierzbno, Nysa County in Opole Voivodeship (south-west Poland)
- Wierzbno, West Pomeranian Voivodeship (north-west Poland)
