= Cordula =

Cordula may mean:

- Cordula (name)
- Saint Cordula, virgin martyr
  - Cordula. Graubündner Sage, an epic poem by Max Waldau, of 1854
- Cordula, a slipper orchid genus nowadays synonymous with Paphiopedilum
- Cordula (film), 1950 film
- Cordula, typical Sardinian dish
