= Księże Pole =

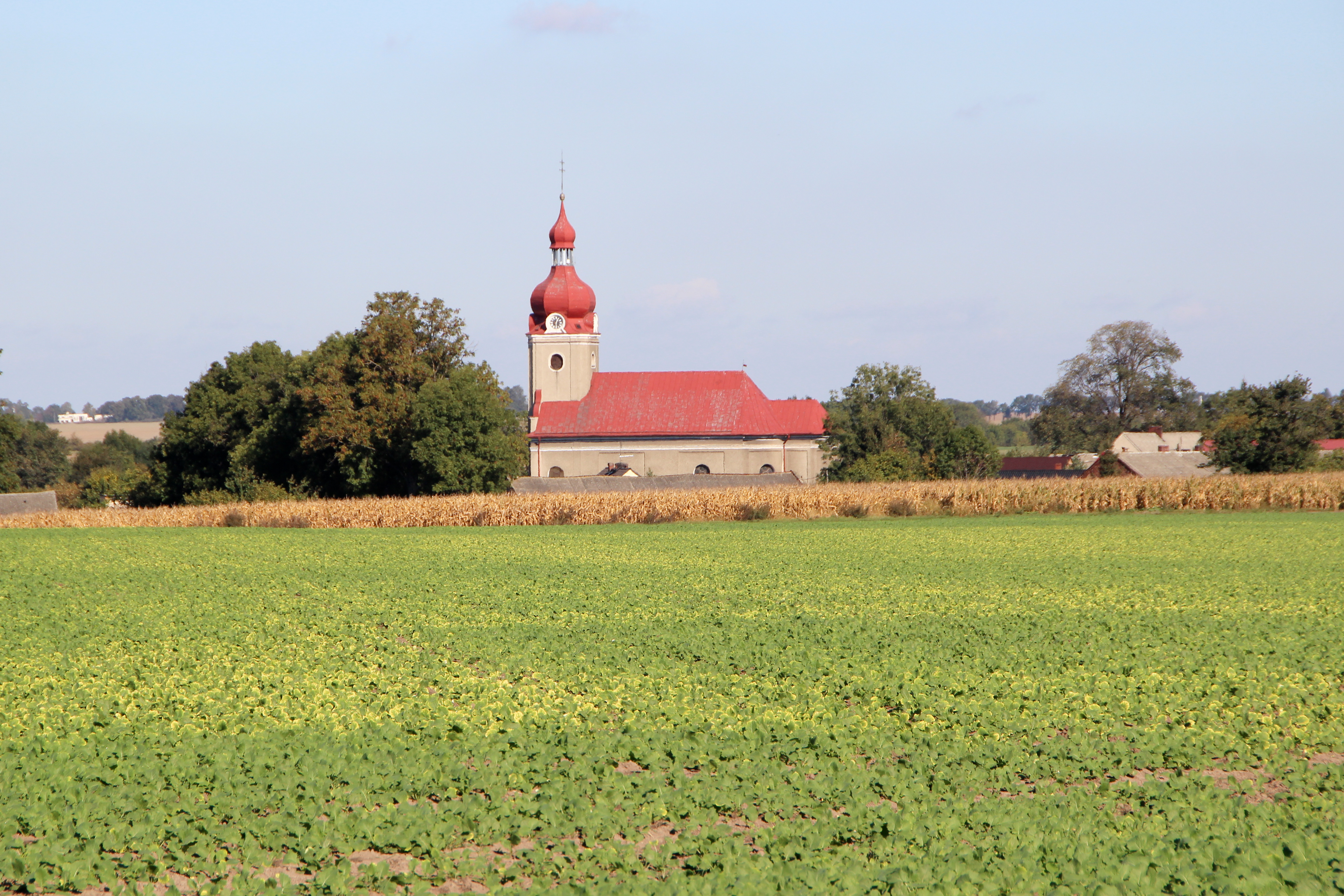
- Church of Saint Bartholomew

- Location within Poland
- Coordinates: 50°6′32″N 17°58′0″E
- Country: Poland
- Voivodeship: Opole
- County: Głubczyce
- Gmina: Baborów
- Time zone: UTC+1 (CET)
  - Summer (DST): UTC+2 (CEST)
- Area code: +48 77
- Car plates: OGL

Księże Pole [ˈkɕɛ̃ʐɛ ˈpɔlɛ] is a village in Opole Voivodeship, Głubczyce County, Gmina Baborów, Poland. It is approximately 6 km (4 mi) south of Baborów, 14 km (9 mi) south-east of Głubczyce, and 62 km (39 mi) south of the regional capital Opole.
