= Leopold Schefer =

German writer (1784–1862)

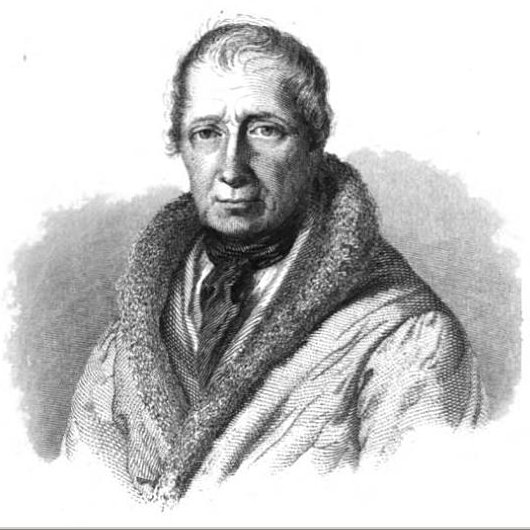
Leopold Schefer

Leopold Schefer (30 July 1784 in Muskau – 13 February 1862 in Muskau), German poet, novelist, and composer, was born in a small town in Upper Lusatia (then under Saxon rule), the only child of a poor country doctor.

== Biography ==
Leopold Schefer was educated, privately, by his parents, later on by the principal of the Muskau primary school, Andreas Tamm, afterwards in a small private school of the former hofmeister of the local Earl of Callenberg, Johann Justus Röhde. From 1799 up to 1805 he attended the secondary school (“Gymnasium”) at Bautzen. During this time he started writing diaries, poems, and compositions, the last under the influence of his teacher Johann Samuel Petri. After that he returned to Muskau, helping his widowed mother, while writing and composing.

During Napoleon's failed campaign in Russia in 1812, Schefer was appointed manager of the big estates of his newly-won friend, Prince Hermann von Pückler-Muskau, doing well under hard circumstances until 1816. The prince, recognizing the literary abilities of his friend, encouraged his early poetical efforts. Having visited England together with Pückler for studying landscape gardens (and being deeply impressed by Eliza O'Neill on the stage), Schefer studied composition under Antonio Salieri in Vienna from 1816–17, and travelled to Italy, Greece, Egypt, Palestine, and Turkey. Schefer returned in 1819 to Muskau, where he remained for all his life, married, fathering one son and four daughters, due to his literary success in easy - after the lost German revolution 1848/49 in poor - circumstances, following his literary pursuits until his death in 1862.

== Works ==
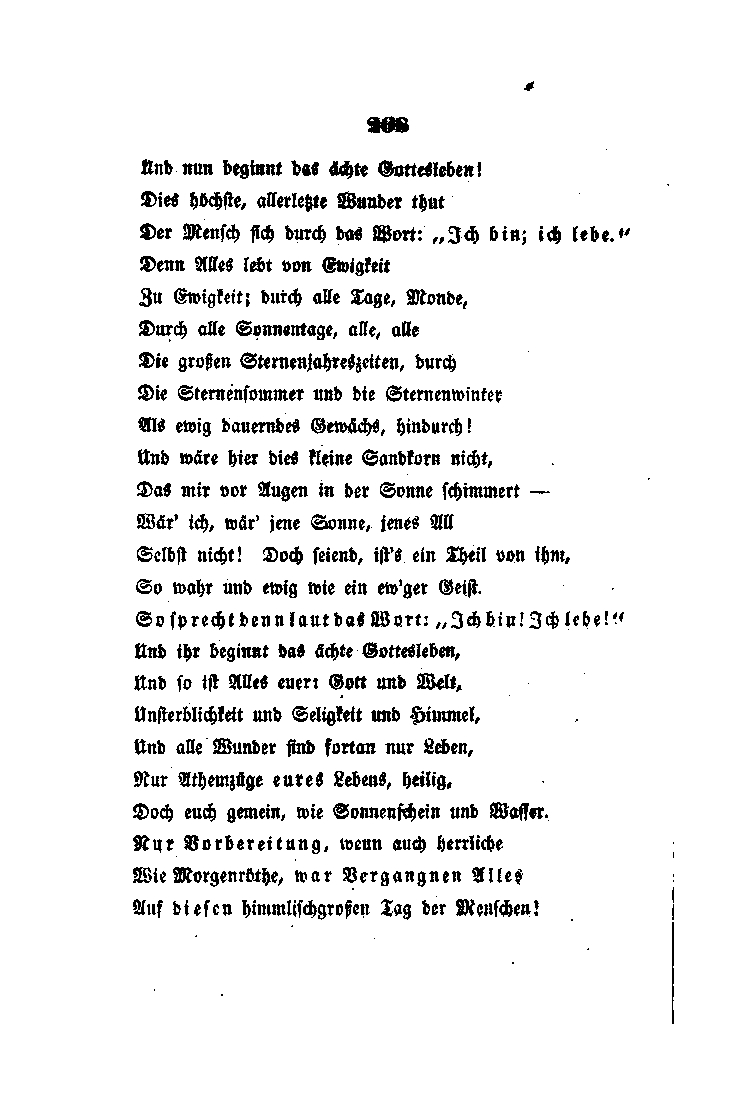
Vigilien, by Leopold Schefer

Schefer wrote a large number of novels, short novels, and narratives which appeared mostly in literary almanacs. Some of his novels have been published in English, as e.g. Künstlerehe (1828, with deep insights into married life).

Schefer was well known for his novels and their observative power, but even more for a single volume of poems, Laienbrevier (1834–1835). These, owing to their warmth of feeling, keen psychology, and descriptions of the beauties of nature, at once established his fame as a poet. This vein he followed in later years with the poems Vigilien (1843), Der Weltpriester (1846), and Hausreden (1869). Encouraged by his friend, the poet Max Waldau (1822–1855), he published Hafis in Hellas (Hamburg, 1853) and Koran der Liebe (Hamburg, 1855) containing with their glowing descriptions of the East love poetry of a realistic and high order. But, due to his pantheistic beliefs, his poetry and novels were barred from the curricula of the Prussian elementary and secondary schools, which resulted in his being forgotten after 1910.

On the occasion of Schefer's 222nd birthday on July 30, 2006, a whole day was devoted to several of Bad Muskau's events as part of the Lusatian Music Summer, above all to his compositional oeuvre.

== Selected publications ==
- A selection of Schefer's works, Ausgewählte Werke, in 12 vols, was published in 1845 (2nd ed., 1857).
- Leopold Schefer, Ausgewählte Lieder und Gesänge zum Pianoforte, ed. & introd. by Ernst-Jürgen Dreyer, Munich: G. Henle (2004)

There are no studies about Schefer in English, but consult Bettina Clausen and Lars Clausen, 1985.

=== Publications during his lifetime ===
- Gedichte, 1811 („Poems“, ed. by the Earl von Pückler-Muskau)
- Leopold Schefer's Gesänge zu dem Pianoforte, 1813 („Leopold Schefer's Songs“, ed. by the Earl von Pückler-Muskau)
- Palmerio, 1823 (novel, situated in contemporary Greece)
- Die Deportirten, 1824 („The Deportees“, novel on self-government at Botany Bay)
- Novellen, 5 vols., 1825 (short novels)
- Die Osternacht, 1826 („Easter Night“, novel on a flood disaster in Rhineland-Palatinate)
- Der Waldbrand, 1827 („The Bushfire“, novel, situated in Canada)
- Künstlerehe, 1828
  - tr. The Artist's Married Life; being that of Albert Dürer, New York 1867, London 1895.
- Kleine lyrische Werke, 1828 (poems)
- Neue Novellen, 4 vols., 1831 (short novels)
- Lavabecher, Novellen, 2 vols., 1833 (short novels)
- Die Gräfin Ulfeld oder die vierundzwanzig Königskinder, 2 vols., 1834 („Dame Ulfeld, or, the 24 Royal Children“, novel on a life sentence on a Danish rebel's widow)
- Laienbrevier, 1834 (1st half of the year)/ 1835 (2nd half of the year). (pantheistic poems, until 1900 21 eds.)
  - tr. The Layman's Breviary, or meditations for every day in the year, Boston (Mass.): C. T. Brooks 1867
- Kleine Romane, 6 vols., 1836 (short novels)
- Das große deutsche Musikfest, 1837 („The Great German Music Festival“, novel)
- Doppelsonate A-Dur zu 4 Händen, 1838 (composition)
- Doppelkanon zu 4 Chören, 1838 (composition)
- Der Gekreuzigte oder Nichts Altes unter der Sonne, 1839 („The Crucified, or, Nothing Old Under the Sun“, novel on a genocide in the Ottoman Empire [subject taken up and transferred to the 20th century by Franz Werfel, The Forty Days of Musa Dagh])
- Mahomet’s Türkische Himmelsbriefe, 1840 („Muhammad’s Turk Letters from Heaven“, poems)
- Viel Sinne, viel Köpfe, 1840 („Many Meanings, Many Minds“, narrative)
- Göttliche Komödie in Rom, 1841 („Divinia Comedia in Rome“, novel on the trial and execution of Giordano Bruno)
- Sechs Volkslieder zum Pianoforte, 1841 (compositions)
- Graf Promnitz. Der letzte des Hauses, 1842 („Earl Promnitz, the Last of the House“, novel)
- Vigilien, Gedichte, 1843 (poems)
- Ausgewählte Werke, 12 vols., 1845/46 ( „Selected Works“)
- Weltpriester, Gedichte, 1846 („The Worldly Priest“, poems)
- Génévion von Toulouse, 1846 („Génévion of Toulouse“, novel)
- Gedichte (2nd ed.), 1846 („Poems“)
- Achtzehn Töchter. Eine Frauen-Novelle, 1847 („18 Daughters. A novel for Women“, short novel)
- Die Sibylle von Mantua, 1852 („The Sibyl of Mantua“, narrative)
- Hafis in Hellas, (anonymously: "Von einem Hadschi"), 1853 (Hafis in Greece. By a Hadschi, love poems)
- Koran der Liebe nebst kleiner Sunna, (anonymously) 1855 („Koran of Love, with a small Sunna“, love poems)
- Hausreden, 1855 („Domestic Speeches“, poems)
- Der Hirtenknabe Nikolas, oder der Kinderkreuzzug im Jahre 1212; 1857 („The Shepard Boy Nikolas, or, the Children’s Cruisade, 1212“, novel)
- Homer’s Apotheose, 1858 („Homer’s Apotheosis“, hexametric epos on the real Homer)

=== Posthumous ===
- Für Haus und Herz. Letzte Klänge,1867 ("For Home and Heart", ed. Rudolf Gottschall, poems)
- Buch des Lebens und der Liebe, 1877 ("The Book on Life and Love". ed. & worked over by Alfred Moschkau)
- Ausgewählte Lieder und Gesänge zum Pianoforte, with e preface ed. by Ernst-Jürgen Dreyer, München: G. Henle 2004 (songs for the pianoforte)
- Tagebuch einer großen Liebe. 22 Lieder von Leopold Schefer, CD, ed. by Freundeskreis Lausitzer Musiksommer. KONSONANZ Musikagentur, Bautzen 2006. Labelcode LC 01135 ("Diary of a Great Love. 22 Lieder of Leopold Schefer", compositions and poems)
