= Wierzbno, Głubczyce County =

Wierzbno
- Village
- Location within Poland Location within Opole Voivodeship
- Coordinates: 50°9′14″N 17°55′32″E
- Country: Poland
- Voivodeship: Opole
- County: Głubczyce
- Gmina: Baborów
- Time zone: UTC+1 (CET)
  - Summer (DST): UTC+2 (CEST)
- Vehicle registration: OGL

Wierzbno [ˈvjɛʐbnɔ] is a settlement, part of the village of Boguchwałów, in the administrative district of Gmina Baborów, within Głubczyce County, Opole Voivodeship, in southern Poland. It lies approximately 4 kilometres (2 mi) west of Baborów, 9 km (6 mi) south-east of Głubczyce, and 57 km (35 mi) south of the regional capital Opole.

The name of the village is of Polish origin and comes from the word wierzba, which means "willow".
