= Moschkau =

Moschkau is a German language surname. Notable people with the name include:

- Alfred Moschkau (1848–1912), German philatelist and local historian
- Kathleen Slattery-Moschkau, American filmmaker, yoga instructor, and former pharmaceutical sales representative
