= Czerwonków =

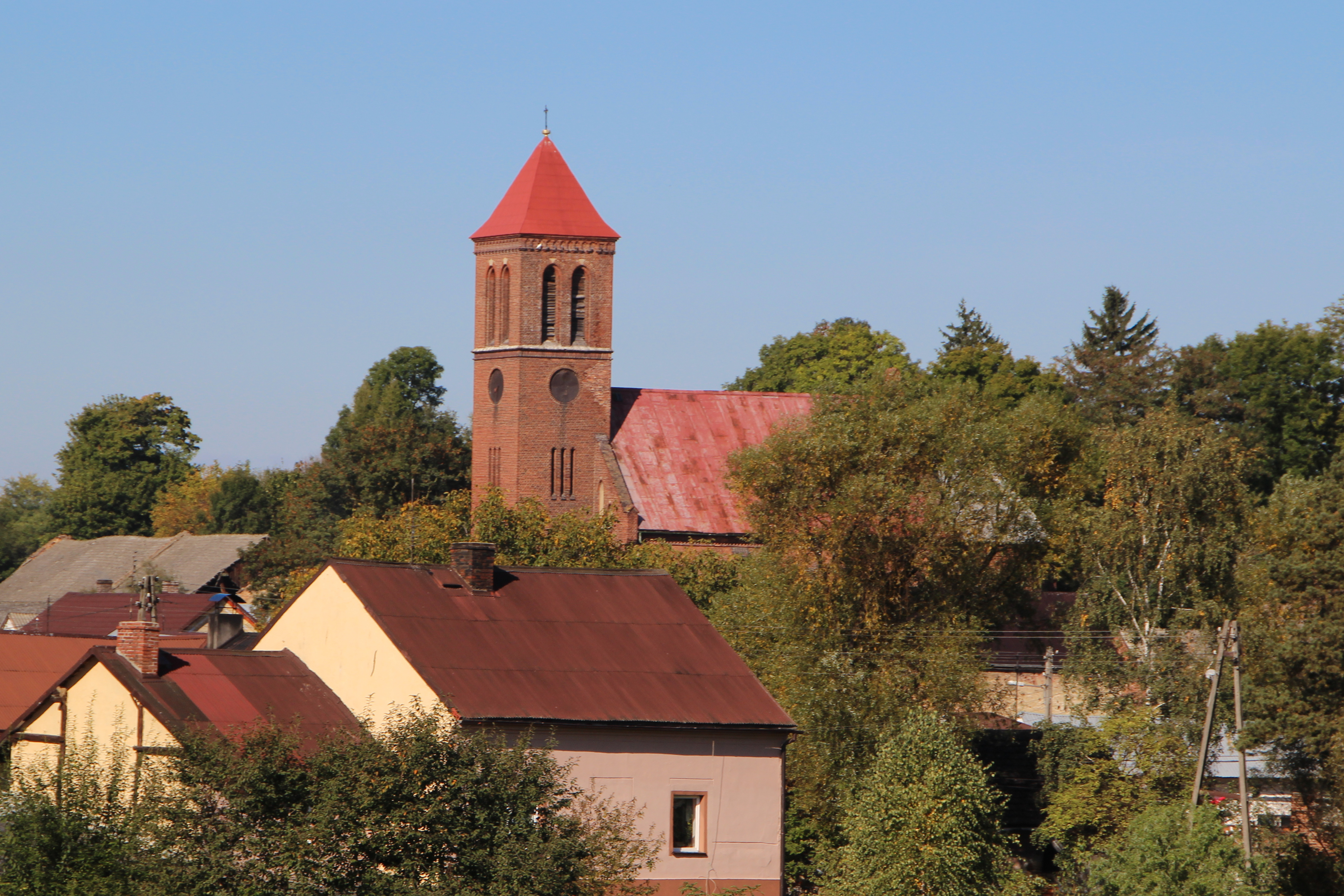
- Church

- Location within Poland
- Coordinates: 50°7′15″N 17°57′11″E
- Country: Poland
- Voivodeship: Opole
- County: Głubczyce
- Gmina: Baborów
- Time zone: UTC+1 (CET)
  - Summer (DST): UTC+2 (CEST)
- Area code: +48 77
- Car plates: OGL

Czerwonków [t͡ʂɛrˈvɔŋkuf] is a village in Opole Voivodeship, Głubczyce County, Gmina Baborów.
