= Sucha Psina =

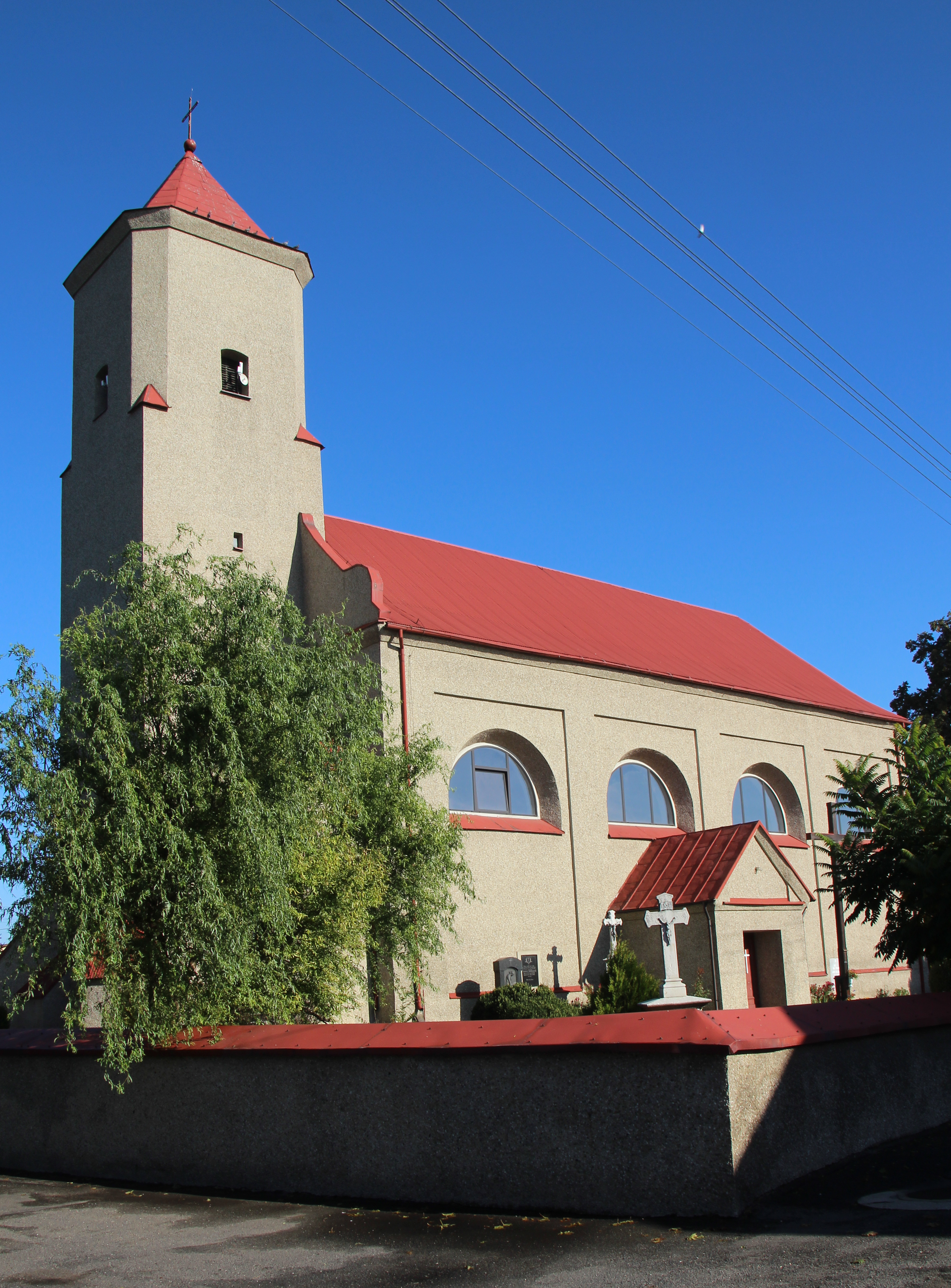
- Saint Judoc Church

- Location within Poland
- Coordinates: 50°7′9″N 17°55′33″E
- Country: Poland
- Voivodeship: Opole
- County: Głubczyce
- Gmina: Baborów
- Time zone: UTC+1 (CET)
  - Summer (DST): UTC+2 (CEST)
- Postal code: 48-133
- Area code: +48 77
- Car plates: OGL

Sucha Psina, pronounced: [ˈsuxa ˈpɕina] is a village in Opole Voivodeship, Głubczyce County, Gmina Baborów.
