= Szczyty, Opole Voivodeship =

Szczyty
- Location within Poland
- Coordinates: 50°10′1″N 18°3′4″E
- Country: Poland
- Voivodeship: Opole
- County: Głubczyce
- Gmina: Baborów
- Time zone: UTC+1 (CET)
  - Summer (DST): UTC+2 (CEST)
- Area code: +48 77
- Car plates: OGL

Szczyty (pronounced: [ˈʂt͡ʂɨtɨ]) is a village in Gmina Baborów, Opole Voivodeship, Poland.

== History ==
In the German era, the village belonged to the historic Racibórz County, Upper Silesia.

== People ==
- Eduard von Liebert, German military officer, died there in 1934
- Max Waldau, German writer, died there in 1855

== See also ==
- Szczyty-Dzięciołowo, Szczyty-Nowodwory
