= Eduard von Liebert =

German non-fiction writer (1850–1934)

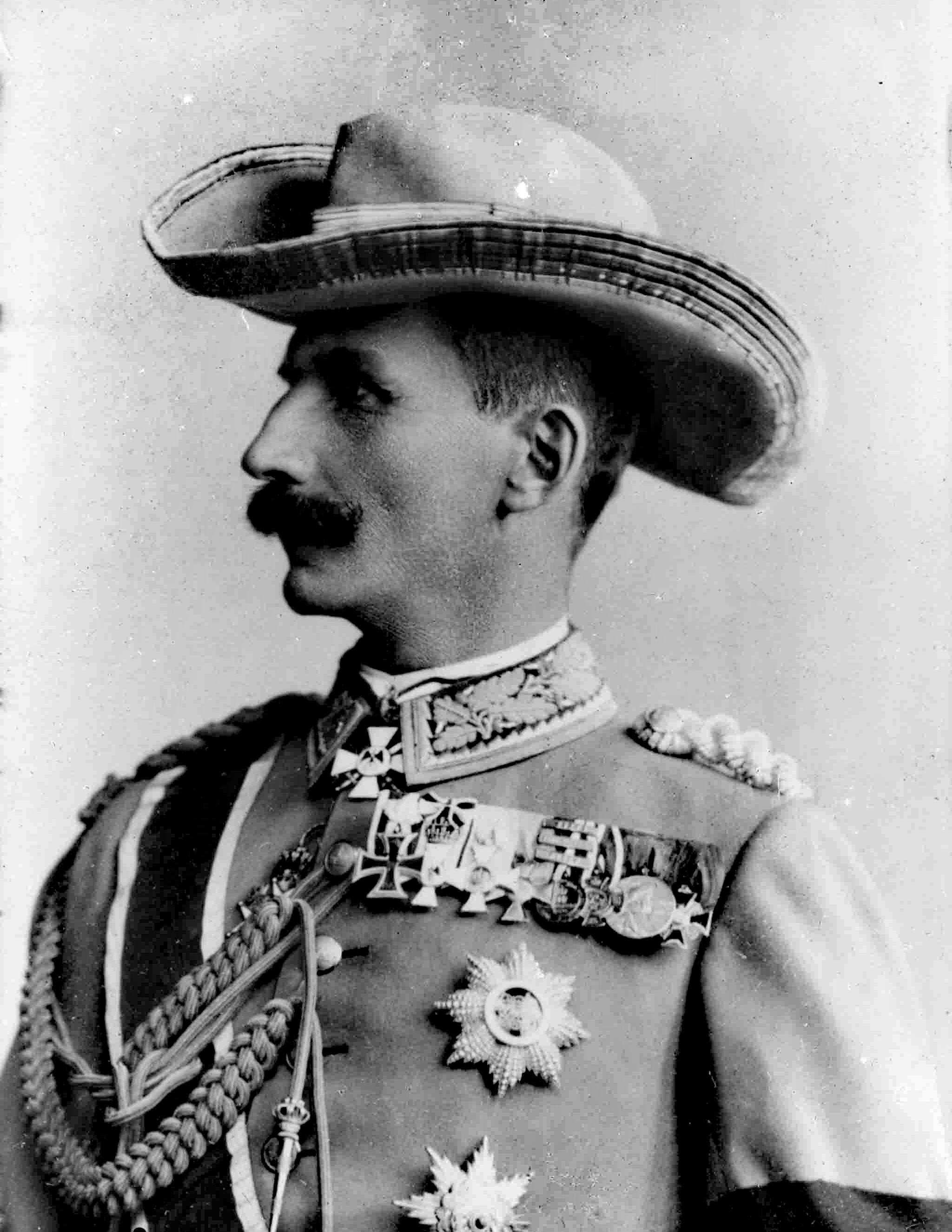

5th Reichskommissar of German East Africa
- In office 4 December 1896 – 12 March 1901
- Preceded by: Hermann von Wissmann
- Succeeded by: Gustav Adolf Graf von Götzen

Member of the Imperial Diet
- In office 1907–1914

Personal details
- Born: 16 April 1850 Rendsburg, Duchy of Holstein, Denmark
- Died: 14 November 1934 (aged 84) Tscheidt, Prussia, Nazi Germany
- Party: Free Conservative Party (1907–1918); Fatherland Party (1918–1919); National People's Party (1919–1929); Nazi Party (1929–1934)
- Spouse(s): Helene Dittmer (1876–1899); Maria Charlotte (m. 1899)
- Children: 1

Military service
- Allegiance: Kingdom of Prussia (1866–1871); German Empire (1871–1917)
- Branch/service: Prussian Army
- Years of service: 1866–1917
- Rank: General der Infanterie
- Commands: Schutztruppe of German East Africa; 6th Division; 15th Reserve Division; Generalkommando z.b.V. 54
- Battles/wars: Austro-Prussian War; Franco-Prussian War; German colonization of Africa; World War I

Eduard von Liebert, or Eduard Wilhelm Hans Liebert (born 16 April 1850 in Rendsburg; died 14 November 1934 in Tscheidt) was a German military officer, colonial administrator and statesman who served in World War I, and a Governor of German East Africa. He also was active in several right-wing organisations and parties and was a member of the Imperial Diet (German: Reichstag) for the Free Conservative Party from 1907 until 1914.

== Early life ==
At his birth, his father, Friedrich Wilhelm Liebert (1805–53) was a major in the Prussian general staff, and was taking part in the war against Denmark. His mother was Friederike Karoline, née Schindler (1829-1908).

== Career ==
=== Early military career: 1866–1889 ===
Eduard von Liebert joined the 58th (3rd Posen) Infantry Regiment of the Prussian Army as an ensign at a very early age. He saw action in the Battle of Nachod in 1866 and was promoted to lieutenant on 6 August. Four years later, in 1870, he took part in the Franco-Prussian War, and was lightly wounded near Wörth, but was able to rejoin the fighting around Paris. For this, he received the Iron Cross. He attended the Prussian Staff College (German: Preußische Kriegsakademie) afterwards, graduating from there when 26 years old, in 1872. Afterwards, he was an instructor at the Military School in Hanover. While there, in 1878, he was one of the twelve citizens who formed the "Provisional Committee for the Foundation of a Geographical Society in Hanover. He was promoted to captain in 1880 and joined the general staff in the military college at Metz where he taught military strategy. He became a major in 1886.

During these years he travelled several times to Russia, and published Der polnische Kriegsschauplatz under the pseudonym of Sarmaticus, which was indicative of his interest in military tactics.

=== Colonial service: 1889–1896 ===
Early on, he came into contact with well-known colonial pioneers and leading colonial politicians. In exalting the heroes of the military, and the political achievements of Frederick William, "the Great Elector", and in seeking comparison with the colonialist movements of his own time, he delivered a lecture entitled "The colonial politics of the Great Elector" in 1888.

In 1889–90 Liebert was sent to East Africa, on behalf of Bismarck to report on Captain Hermann von Wissmann's expedition. He returned to Germany in 1890 and was present when the Kaiser, Wilhelm II received the Zanzibari embassy at Potsdam, along with the then German consul-general of Zanzibar, Michahelles, Count Eulenberg and Otto von Bismarck.

About this time he got to know Wissmann well. The latter had been appointed Reich Commissioner for German East Africa, in the face of indigenous uprisings encountered there, and had the task of quelling the rebellions. Wissmann had quickly mustered up a sizeable force, helped by a change of policy by Bismarck. In his campaigns there, Liebert kept him supplied with officers and men. From his journey there Liebert gained valuable first-hand knowledge of the country.

Upon his return to Germany, Liebert was transferred to the General Staff of the X Army Corps in Hanover in 1891, and eventually rose to become Chief of the General Staff, and further elevated to the rank of a colonel. At age 44, he was at the same time commander of the 12th Grenadier Regiment in Frankfurt. During that time Liebert served as companion to the Chinese viceroy, Li Hung-Chang who was visiting Germany in 1896, and drove with him to Frankfurt to have the 12th Grenadiers presented to him there. The Chinese Order of the Double Dragon, 1st Class was awarded to Liebert in part due to his service for the viceroy. Due to his enthusiasm for colonialism, he fell out of favour in Berlin, and Leo von Caprivi, who had succeeded Bismarck as Chancellor of Germany in 1890, even threatened to ban him from speaking. In a speech during this time given at the Association of German Students in Berlin, he passionately quoted a verse from Felix Dahn's Walhall:

Seitdem ist's freudig Germanenrecht,
Mit dem Hammer Land zu erwerben;
Wir sind von des Hammergottes Geschlecht
Und wollen sein Weltreich erben.

(Since that time it is the defiant right of the German
To acquire land with the hammer.
We are from the race of the hammer-god
And resolve to inherit his empire.)

=== Governor of East Africa: 1896–1901 ===
On 3 December 1896 he was appointed Governor of German East Africa, After arriving in East Africa at the beginning of 1907, he first travelled to the southern part of the colony, neglected until then, and was impressed by the rich forests around the Rufiji Delta which had been found by the forest assessor, August von Bruchhausen, who had arrived in 1896.

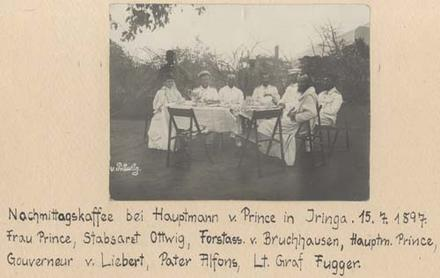
Group portrait of Tom von Prince, Magdalene von Prince, August von Bruchhausen, Eduard von Liebert, Fugger von Glött, Ottwig, Alfons (Pater)

He continued relentlessly to try to pacify the tribes which had proved threatening prior to his arrival, and which had been severely suppressed by Wissmann. Liebert sent troops against the Nguni and the Wayao in the south of the country. He despatched Tom von Prince to Uhehe, although the Wahehe had been weakened by the assaults of von Schele. He also sent troops to contain land near Lake Victoria, to the north west of the country. In addition, he sought to achieve greater settlement of the highlands by German immigrants.

He tried to increase government revenues by the commercial exploitation of plants. Tobacco cultivation had proved to be a failure, and coffee planting had also encountered major difficulties, but an important crop was available, the agave, sisal. In 1892, Dr. Richard Hindorf, then working on an estate near Amani, had been attracted by a paper on the sisal plant, a native plant of the Yucatan, which he later introduced into the colony. Its success led to plantation construction on a large scale at that time in the lowlands of Tanga region.

Amid great controversy, his single-minded attempt to enforce the hut tax in order to raise revenue, was not well received. The hut tax, introduced in 1897, was the first practical step to make the land and its inhabitants usable to further colonization plans of the German administration. The task of collection, however, was almost impossible, not least because of the prevalent use of barter, lack of a national currency and a dearth of usable roads or other means of communication. Liebert's attempts to build that necessary infrastructure was frustrated by a lack of funds from the colonial department at home. In Berlin, Liebert's ardour, especially his incessant pressure to build paths and railways, was treated with great reluctance. His conviction of the unavoidable necessity of the central railway (Dar es Salaam - Lake Tanganyika), along with the as yet incomplete Usambara railway, and the fact that he tried in vain to obtain any support for it, was considered later to have led to the termination of his position as governor. He was recalled in 1900 for differences of opinion with the colonial department over this matter.

=== Political career and World War I: 1901–1917 ===
On 1 January 1900 Liebert was rewarded with hereditary nobility by Wilhelm II. After holding the command of the 6th Division in Brandenburg for two years (Generalleutnant, April 1901 to April 1903), he submitted his resignation. He gave himself entirely to national political activities after this with the German Colonial Society (German: Deutschen Kolonialgesellschaft) and the Alldeutschen Verband. In 1904, he was also a co-initiator and first chairman of the "Reichsverband gegen die Sozialdemokratie", a political party promoting militarism. In the Reichstag, to which he belonged as a member of the Free Conservative Party from 1907 to 1914, he advocated forced labour, a German national settlement policy and an expansion of German colonial possessions, in opposition to liberal reform policy. Even before the outbreak of World War I, he was inspired by militarism. He publicly censured racial 'corruption' in "Die Zukunftsentwicklung unserer Kolonien"and condemned miscegeny in the colonies. During the First World War, until prevented by his age in 1917, Liebert held various commands at the front, and was awarded the Pour le mérite in 1917.

== Later life and family ==
Liebert married Helene Dittmer on 27 April 1876 in Kiel, daughter of a wine wholesaler and businessman. After the death of his wife, he married her sister Maria Charlotte in Dar es Salaam in 1899. He had a daughter, Elsa, by his first marriage.

After the end of the war, von Liebert agitated as a militant Pan-German and representative for the Fatherland Party. He won a mandate for the Prussian House of Representatives for 1917–18. Like many other colonial officers, Liebert was on the side of the counter-revolutionary forces, and spoke and wrote for nationalist associations. In 1929 he joined the Nazi Party.

In an article celebrating his 80th birthday, he is recorded as living in Munich. He died in Tscheidt on 14 November 1934, aged 84.

== Works ==
- Deutschlands Heldenzeit 1870/71, Liebert, Eduard von. - Berlin-Tempelhof, 1914
- Aus einem bewegten Leben, Liebert, Eduard von. - München, 1925
- Die deutschen Kolonien und ihre Zukunft, Liebert, Eduard von. - Berlin: Voß, 1906
- Der polnische Kriegsschauplatz, Liebert, Eduard von. - Hannover: Helwing, [unknown publishing date]
- Fürst Bismarck und die Armee: Vortrag beim Bismarckkommers in der Philharmonie am 30. März 1912, Liebert, Eduard von

== Biographical sources ==
- "Lebensabriss des Generalleutnants von Liebert" von Oberstleutnant Georg Richelmann in Jahrbuch über die deutschen Kolonien 1911
- Horst Gründer: Liebert, Eduard von. In: Neue Deutsche Biographie (NDB). Band 14, Duncker & Humblot, Berlin 1985, ISBN 3-428-00195-8, S. 487 f. (Digitalisat).
- See also literature on or by Eduard von Liebert at Deutschen Nationalbibliothek
