= Tłustomosty =

- Location within Poland
- Coordinates: 50°6′44″N 18°3′14″E
- Country: Poland
- Voivodeship: Opole
- County: Głubczyce
- Gmina: Baborów
- Time zone: UTC+1 (CET)
  - Summer (DST): UTC+2 (CEST)
- Area code: +48 77
- Car plates: OGL

Tłustomosty (pronounced: [twustɔˈmɔstɨ], German: Stolzmütz) is a village located in the Opole Voivodeship (south-western Poland), Głubczyce County, Gmina Baborów.
