= Gmina Baborów =

Gmina Baborów Baborów Commune
- Gmina
- Coat of arms
- Interactive map of Gmina Baborów
- Coordinates (Baborów): 50°9′28″N 17°58′48″E
- Country: Poland
- Voivodeship: Opole
- County: Głubczyce
- Seat: Baborów

Area
  - Total: 116.97 km^{2} (45.16 sq mi)

Population (2019-06-30)
  - Total: 5,975
  - Density: 51.08/km^{2} (132.3/sq mi)
  - Urban: 2,905
  - Rural: 3,070
- Time zone: UTC+1 (CET)
  - Summer (DST): UTC+2 (CEST)
- Vehicle registration: OGL
- Website: http://www.baborow.pl

Gmina Baborów is an urban-rural gmina (administrative district) in Głubczyce County, Opole Voivodeship, in southern Poland. Its seat is the town of Baborów, which lies approximately 12 kilometres (7 mi) south-east of Głubczyce and 57 km (35 mi) south of the regional capital Opole.

The gmina covers an area of 116.97 square kilometres (45.2 sq mi), and as of 2019, its total population was 5,975.

== Towns and settlements ==
- Towns: Baborów
- Villages: Babice, Boguchwałów (with Wierzbno), Czerwonków, Dziećmarowy, Dzielów, Księże Pole, Langowo, Raków, Sucha Psina, Sułków, Szczyty, Tłustomosty (with Langowo and Rogów)

== Neighbouring gminas ==
Gmina Baborów is bordered by the gminas of Głubczyce, Kietrz, Pawłowiczki, Pietrowice Wielkie, Polska Cerekiew and Rudnik.

== Twin towns – sister cities ==
Gmina Baborów is twinned with:

- Hradec nad Moravicí, Czech Republic
- Teublitz, Germany
