= Dzielów =

- Location within Poland
- Coordinates: 50°8′12″N 18°0′10″E
- Country: Poland
- Voivodeship: Opole
- County: Głubczyce
- Gmina: Baborów
- Time zone: UTC+1 (CET)
  - Summer (DST): UTC+2 (CEST)
- Area code: +48 77
- Car plates: OGL

Dzielów [ˈd͡ʑɛluf] is a village in south-western Poland, in Opole Voivodeship, Głubczyce County, Gmina Baborów.

== Notable residents ==
- Max Chmel (1915–1945), German Wehrmacht noncommissioned officer
