= Max Waldau =

German writer (1825–1855)

Richard Georg Spiller von Hauenschild, better known by his pseudonym Max Waldau (10 March 1825 – 20 January 1855), was a German poet and novelist.

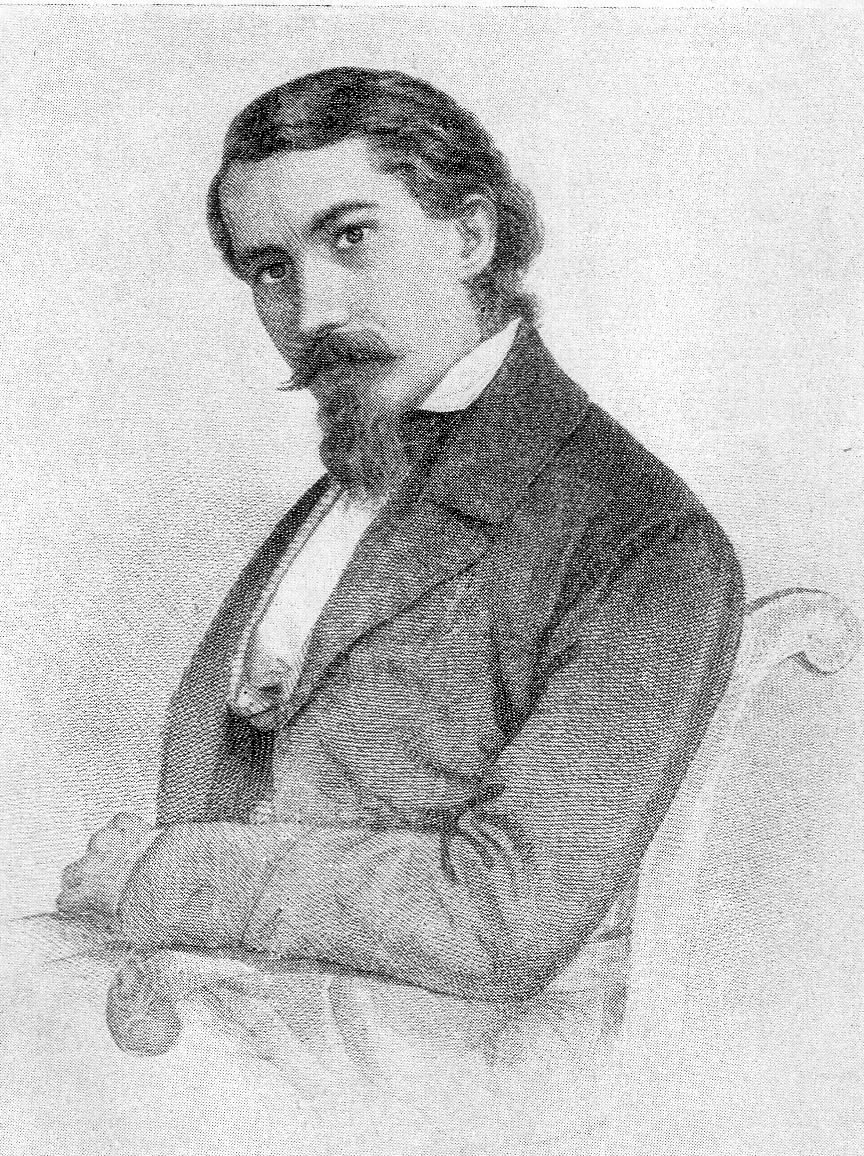
Max Waldau

== Life ==
Born in Breslau (Wrocław), Prussian Silesia, Waldau lost his father early on in life, was educated in several boarding schools, and started studying law at Breslau University. Later, he took up philosophy, philology, and history at Heidelberg University, where he received a doctorate. Waldau traveled for an extended period of time in Germany, Switzerland, France, Belgium, and Italy, though, after the failed German revolution of 1848–1849, he retired to his estate of Tscheidt, near Bauerwitz (Baborów), Upper Silesia.

Waldau started publishing poetry and prose in 1847; his compositions, while well written, lacked emotion and excitement. But, his friendship with Leopold Schefer, an older and more prestigious poet, resulted in Schefer releasing two series of beautiful poems, written in his youth, anonymously to the public; Waldau edited these collections, Hafis in Hellas and Koran der Liebe, in Hamburg 1853 resp. 1855.

Waldau died at the age of 30 at Tscheidt.

== Publications ==
- 1847: Ein Elfenmärchen (fairy tale)
- 1847: Blätter im Winde (poetry)
- 1848: Kanzonen (poetry)
- 1850: Aus der Junkerwelt (novel)
- 1851: Nach der Natur. Lebende Bilder aus der Zeit (prose)
- 1852: Aimiry, der Jongleur (novel)
- 1854: Cordula. Graubündner Sage
- 1855: Rahab. Frauenbild aus der Bibel

== Literature ==
Waldau's manuscripts, papers, and letters at Tscheidt must be considered lost due to acts of war, 1945.

- Franz Pietsch: Max Waldau: Ein Beitrag zur Geschichte des Jungen Deutschland unter Benutzung ungedruckter handschriftlicher Quellen, Phil. Diss., Breslau 1921 [in German]
- Karl Schumacher: Max Waldau (Richard Georg von Hauenschild): Leben, Werke und Schicksal eines deutschen Dichters; unter Benutzung des Nachlasses und bisher nicht bearbeiteter Quellen, Germanische Studien, vol. 38, Ebering, Berlin 1925 [in German]
