= Ernst-Jürgen Dreyer =

German writer (1934–2011)

Ernst-Jürgen Dreyer (20 August 1934, in Oschatz – 3 December 2011, in Neuss) was a German writer, translator, playwright and musicologist.

== Selected publications ==
=== Prose ===
- Die Spaltung, novel, Siegburg, 1979. Berlin 1980
  - Die Spaltung, 2 vols, ed. with commentaries, indices, pictures, Audio CD, by Bettina Clausen, Frankfurt on Main 2001, ISBN 3-87877-771-X
- Ein Fall von Liebeserschleichung, story, Frankfurt on Main 1980, ISBN 3-548-38511-7

=== Poems ===
- Hirnsfürze, Hamburg 1988
- Gift & Gülle, Hamburg 1995
- SCHielfleiSCH, Hamburg 1995
- Kotblech, Hamburg 1996
- Bodenhaltung, Hamburg 2000
- Gottvaters Glans, Hamburg 2002
- VERKAARSTUNG und andere Sonette, Hamburg 2004

=== Musicology ===
- Versuch, eine Morphologie der Musik zu begründen, mit einer Einleitung über Goethes Tonlehre, Bonn 1976.
- Entwurf einer zusammenhängenden Harmonielehre, Bonn 1977.
- Goethes Ton-Wissenschaft, Frankfurt on Main/Berlin/Vienna 1985, ISBN 3-548-35217-0.
- Robert Gund, 1865-1927. Ein vergessener Meister des Liedes, Bonn, 1988.
- Zwei Briefe Richard Wagners an den Komponisten Robert von Hornstein im E.W. Bonsels-Verlag. Mit einer Monographie über Robert von Hornstein und einem Anhang über Robert Grund. Wiesbaden (Harrassowitz) 2000 (= Ambacher Schriften 10). ISBN 3-447-04294-X.
- (with Bernd-Ingo Friedrich) “Mit Begeisterung und nicht für Geld geschrieben”. Das musikalische Werk des Dichters Leopold Schefer, Görlitz/Zittau: Gunter Oettel 2006, ISBN 3-938583-06-1

=== Philology ===
- Ferdinand von Hornstein, der Autor der ’Lieder an eine Göttin‘, Wiesbaden 2001 (= Ambacher Schriften 11)

=== Translations (into German) ===
- Francesco Petrarca, Canzoniere, Basel/Frankfurt on Main, 1989, ISBN 3-87877-329-3
- Guido Cavalcanti, Le Rime – Die Gedichte, Mainz 1991, ISBN 3-87162-009-2
- Mihai Eminescu, Der Abendstern – Gedichte, Mainz 2000, ISBN 3-87162-048-3

=== Editions ===
- Kleinste Prosa der deutschen Sprache. Texte aus acht Jahrhunderten (anthology), Munich 1970, ISBN B0000BS0UJ
- Ladislaus Szücs, Zählappell. Als Arzt im Konzentrationslager, Frankfurt on Main 1995, ISBN 3-596-12965-6
- Leopold Schefer, "Das Vater unser. Doppelkanon zu 4 Stimmen", Partitur (CV 23.305) und Chorpartitur (CV 23.305/05), Stuttgart 1998
- Leopold Schefer, "Ausgewählte Lieder und Gesänge zum Pianoforte", in: Frühromantik (Vol. 6, in: "Das Erbe deutscher Musik", No. 122), Munich (G. Henle) 2004
- Dichter als Komponisten. Kompositionen und literarische Texte vom 13. bis zum 20. Jahrhundert, Cologne 2005

== Gallery ==
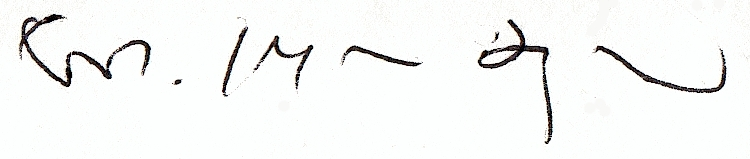
Autograph of Ernst-Jürgen Dreyer
