= Dziećmarów =

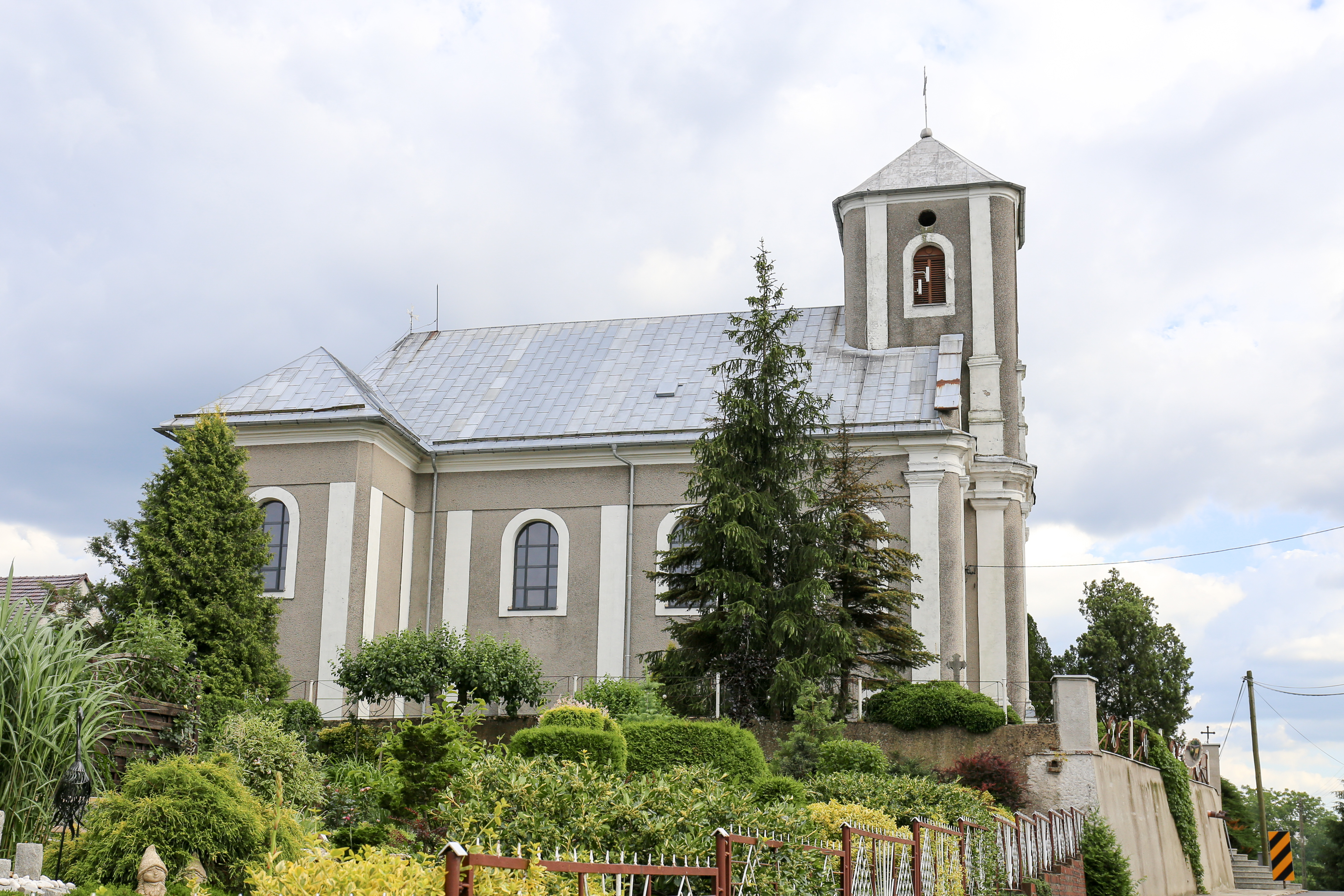
- Church of Saint Michael

- Location within Poland
- Coordinates: 50°11′57″N 17°57′14″E
- Country: Poland
- Voivodeship: Opole
- County: Głubczyce
- Gmina: Baborów

Government
  - Sołtys: Józef Śrutwa

Area
  - Total: 9.7 km^{2} (3.7 sq mi)
- Elevation: 275–280 m (902–919 ft)

Population (2006)
  - Total: 268
- Time zone: UTC+1 (CET)
  - Summer (DST): UTC+2 (CEST)
- Postal code: 48-120
- Area code: +48 77
- Car plates: OGL

Dziećmarów [d͡ʑɛt͡ɕˈmaruv] is a village in Opole Voivodeship, Głubczyce County, Gmina Baborów.

== Population ==
| Year | Population |
|---|---|
| 1783 | 646 |
| 1845 | 718 |
| 1880 | 857 |
| 1910 | 979 |
| 1918 | 731 |
| 1942 | 719 |
| 2006 | 268 |
