= Langowo =

Coordinates: 50°06′28″N 18°01′35″E

- Village
- Interactive map of Langowo
- Country: Poland
- Voivodeship: Opole
- County: Głubczyce
- Gmina: Baborów

Langowo (former name Łęgi [ˈwɛnɡi]) is a village in the administrative district of Gmina Baborów, within Głubczyce County, Opole Voivodeship, in south-western Poland.
