= Babice (Hradec Králové District) =

- Municipality
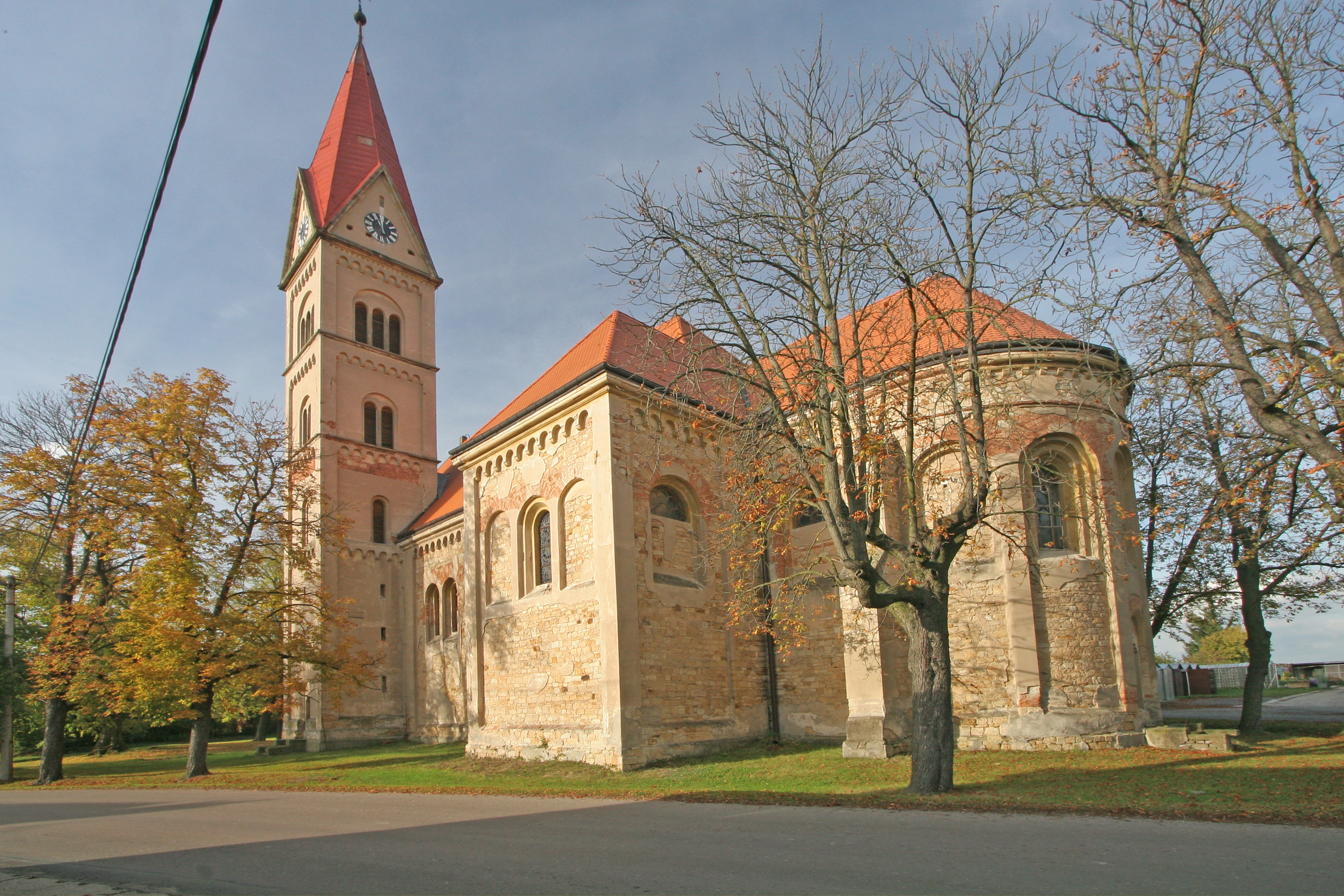
- Church of Saints Peter and Paul

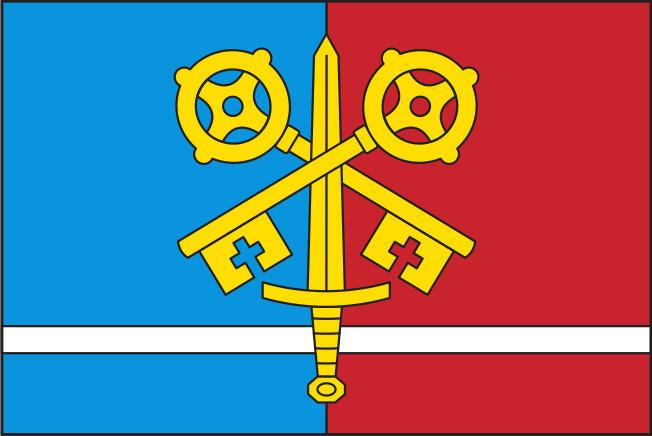
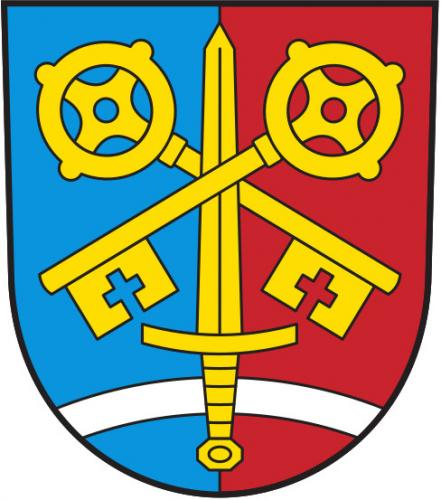
- Flag Coat of arms

- Location in the Czech Republic
- Coordinates: 50°11′32″N 15°35′8″E
- Country: Czech Republic
- Region: Hradec Králové
- District: Hradec Králové
- First mentioned: 1363

Area
  - Total: 2.55 km^{2} (0.98 sq mi)
- Elevation: 235 m (771 ft)

Population (2026-01-01)
  - Total: 203
  - Density: 79.6/km^{2} (206/sq mi)
- Time zone: UTC+1 (CET)
  - Summer (DST): UTC+2 (CEST)
- Postal code: 503 51
- Website: www.ou-babice.cz

Babice is a municipality and village in Hradec Králové District in the Hradec Králové Region of the Czech Republic. It has about 200 inhabitants.

== Demographics ==
Historical population
Year	Pop.	±%
1869	396	—
1880	420	+6.1%
1890	404	−3.8%
1900	403	−0.2%
1910	394	−2.2%
1921	356	−9.6%
1930	329	−7.6%
1950	279	−15.2%
1961	281	+0.7%
1970	235	−16.4%
1980	205	−12.8%
1991	216	+5.4%
2001	216	+0.0%
2011	195	−9.7%
2021	179	−8.2%
Source: Censuses
