= Kbel (Plzeň-South District) =

- Municipality
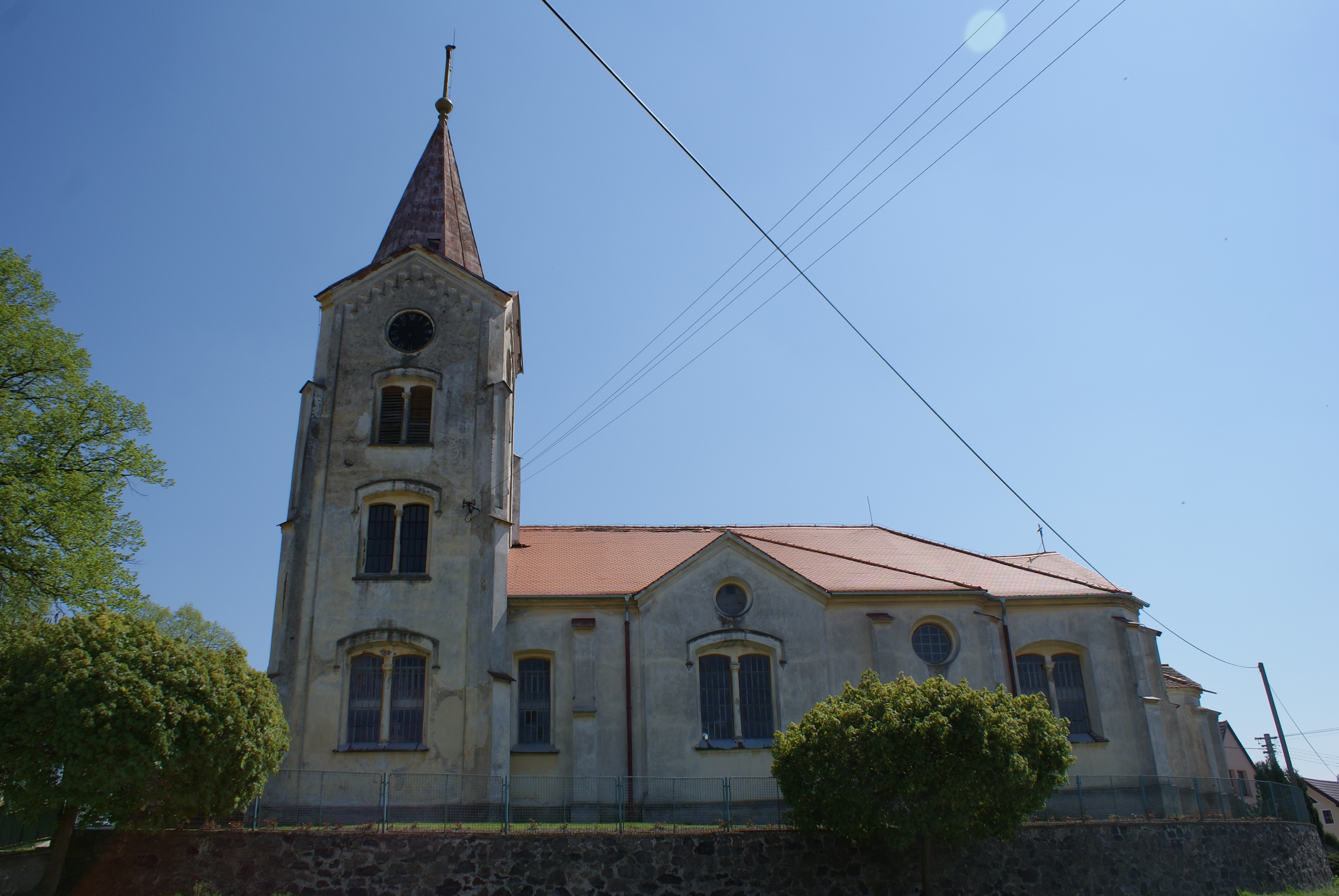
- Church of All Saints

- Location in the Czech Republic
- Coordinates: 49°29′38″N 13°21′56″E
- Country: Czech Republic
- Region: Plzeň
- District: Plzeň-South
- First mentioned: 1352

Area
  - Total: 9.26 km^{2} (3.58 sq mi)
- Elevation: 447 m (1,467 ft)

Population (2026-01-01)
  - Total: 286
  - Density: 30.9/km^{2} (80.0/sq mi)
- Time zone: UTC+1 (CET)
  - Summer (DST): UTC+2 (CEST)
- Postal code: 340 12
- Website: www.obec-kbel.cz

Kbel is a municipality and village in Plzeň-South District in the Plzeň Region of the Czech Republic. It has about 300 inhabitants.

Kbel lies approximately 29 kilometres (18 mi) south of Plzeň and 101 km (63 mi) south-west of Prague.

== Administrative division ==
Kbel consists of five municipal parts (in brackets population according to the 2021 census):

- Kbel (134)
- Babice (9)
- Malinec (92)
- Mečkov (25)
- Nová Ves (39)

== Demographics ==
Historical population
| Year | Pop. | ±% |
|---|---|---|
| 1869 | 972 | — |
| 1880 | 992 | +2.1% |
| 1890 | 863 | −13.0% |
| 1900 | 909 | +5.3% |
| 1910 | 948 | +4.3% |
| 1921 | 951 | +0.3% |
| 1930 | 789 | −17.0% |
| 1950 | 562 | −28.8% |
| 1961 | 531 | −5.5% |
| 1970 | 450 | −15.3% |
| 1980 | 400 | −11.1% |
| 1991 | 316 | −21.0% |
| 2001 | 281 | −11.1% |
| 2011 | 292 | +3.9% |
| 2021 | 299 | +2.4% |
Source: Censuses
