= Babice nad Svitavou =

- Municipality
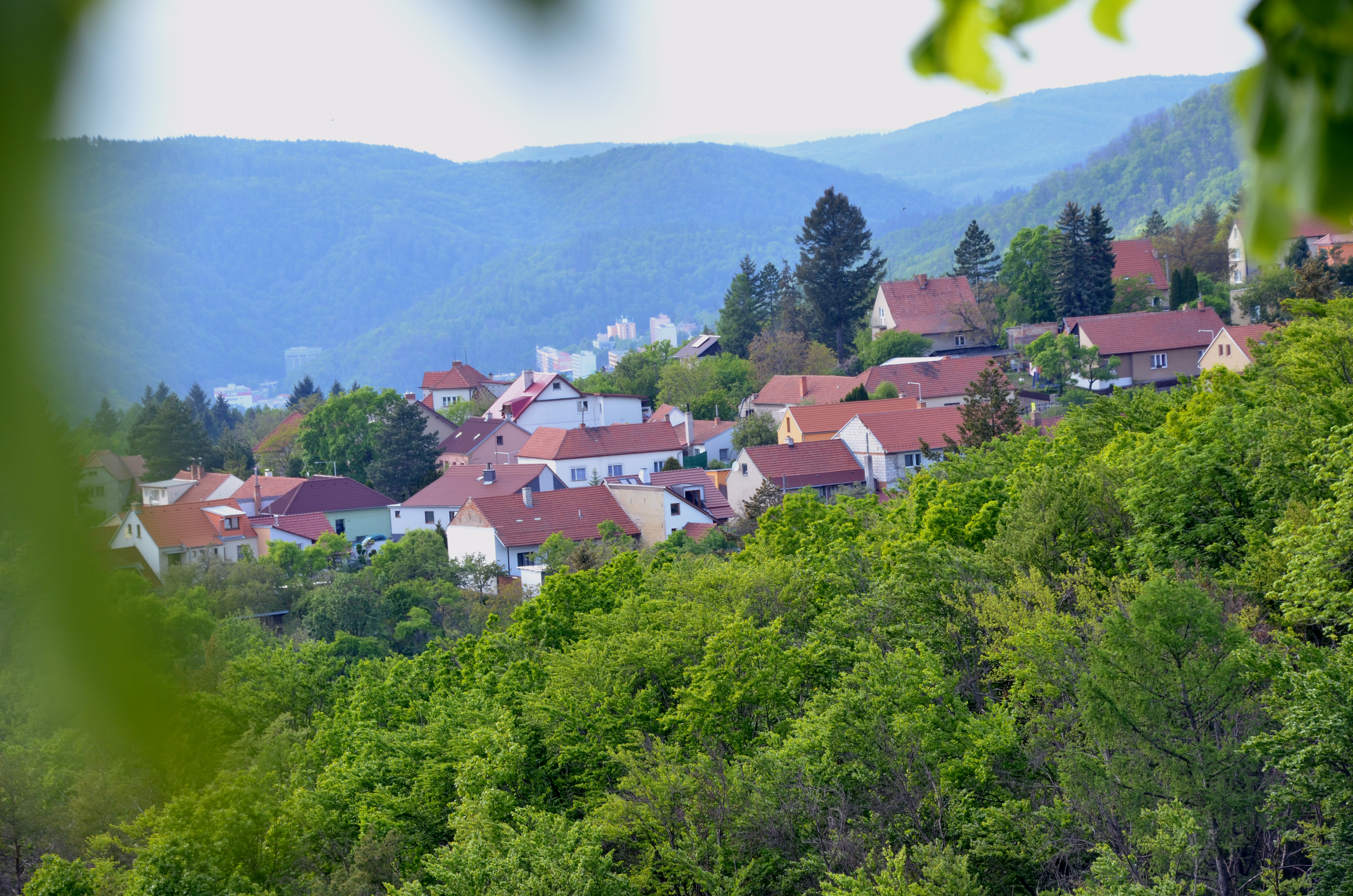
- View of Babice nad Svitavou

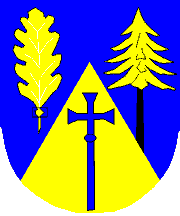
- Flag Coat of arms

- Location in the Czech Republic
- Coordinates: 49°17′0″N 16°41′46″E
- Country: Czech Republic
- Region: South Moravian
- District: Brno-Country
- First mentioned: 1365

Area
  - Total: 17.42 km^{2} (6.73 sq mi)
- Elevation: 420 m (1,380 ft)

Population (2026-01-01)
  - Total: 1,465
  - Density: 84.10/km^{2} (217.8/sq mi)
- Time zone: UTC+1 (CET)
  - Summer (DST): UTC+2 (CEST)
- Postal code: 664 01
- Website: www.babice-nad-svitavou.cz

Babice nad Svitavou is a municipality and village in Brno-Country District in the South Moravian Region of the Czech Republic. It has about 1,500 inhabitants. It lies on the Svitava River.

== Demographics ==
Historical population
Year	Pop.	±%
1869	627	—
1880	717	+14.4%
1890	885	+23.4%
1900	924	+4.4%
1910	984	+6.5%
1921	942	−4.3%
1930	1,041	+10.5%
1950	1,063	+2.1%
1961	1,008	−5.2%
1970	974	−3.4%
1980	908	−6.8%
1991	834	−8.1%
2001	859	+3.0%
2011	1,021	+18.9%
2021	1,383	+35.5%
Source: Censuses
