= Kyjov (Žďár nad Sázavou District) =

- Municipality
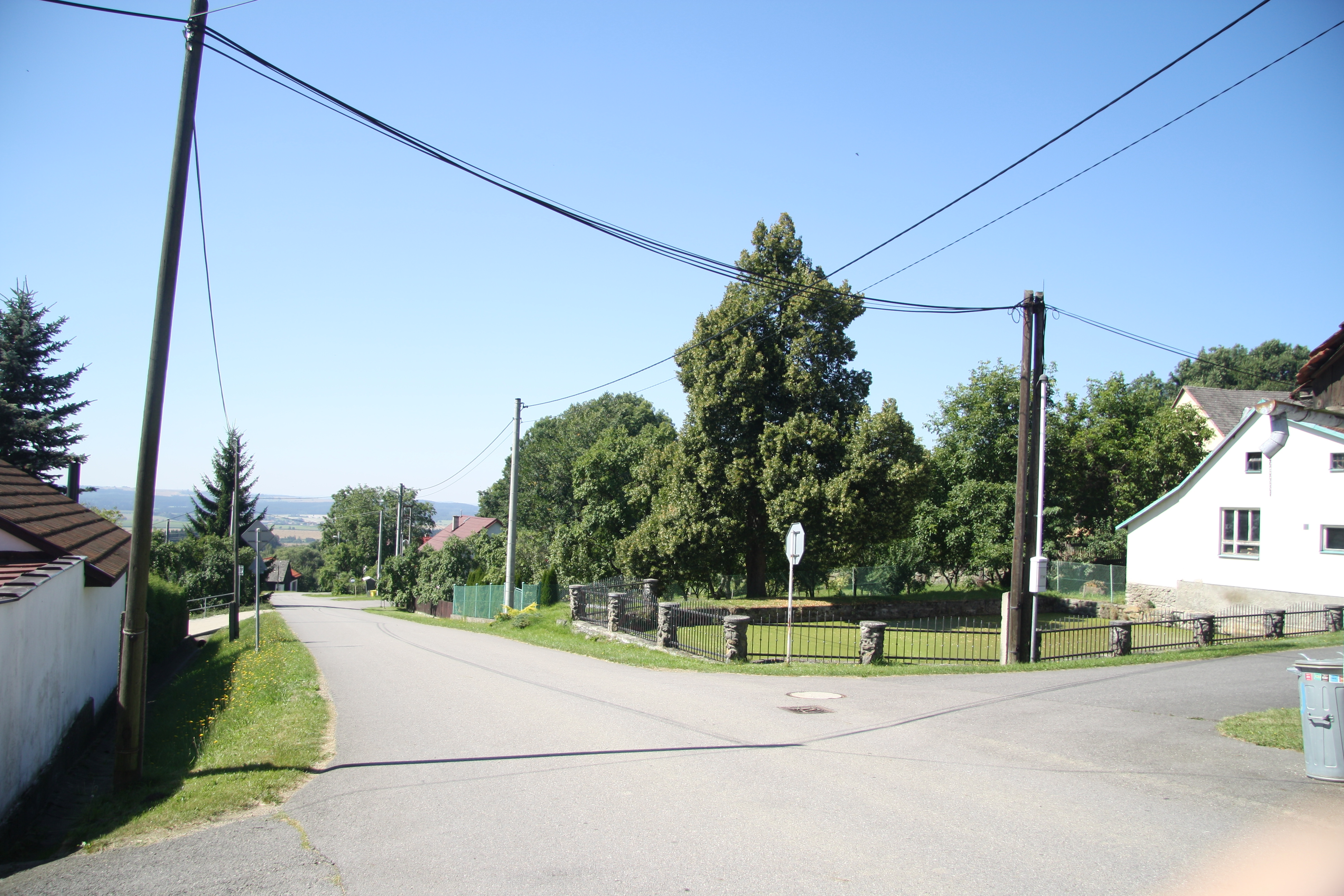
- Centre of Kyjov

- Location in the Czech Republic
- Coordinates: 49°26′37″N 15°52′54″E
- Country: Czech Republic
- Region: Vysočina
- District: Žďár nad Sázavou
- First mentioned: 1407

Area
  - Total: 1.75 km^{2} (0.68 sq mi)
- Elevation: 640 m (2,100 ft)

Population (2026-01-01)
  - Total: 58
  - Density: 33/km^{2} (86/sq mi)
- Time zone: UTC+1 (CET)
  - Summer (DST): UTC+2 (CEST)
- Postal code: 592 14
- Website: www.kyjovzr.cz

Kyjov is a municipality and village in Žďár nad Sázavou District in the Vysočina Region of the Czech Republic. It has about 60 inhabitants.

Kyjov lies approximately 15 kilometres (9 mi) south of Žďár nad Sázavou, 22 km (14 mi) east of Jihlava, and 127 km (79 mi) south-east of Prague.

== Demographics ==
Historical population
Year	Pop.	±%
1869	93	—
1880	125	+34.4%
1890	115	−8.0%
1900	102	−11.3%
1910	116	+13.7%
1921	106	−8.6%
1930	86	−18.9%
1950	88	+2.3%
1961	87	−1.1%
1970	83	−4.6%
1980	70	−15.7%
1991	70	+0.0%
2001	52	−25.7%
2011	40	−23.1%
2021	45	+12.5%
Source: Censuses
