= Babice u Rosic =

- Municipality
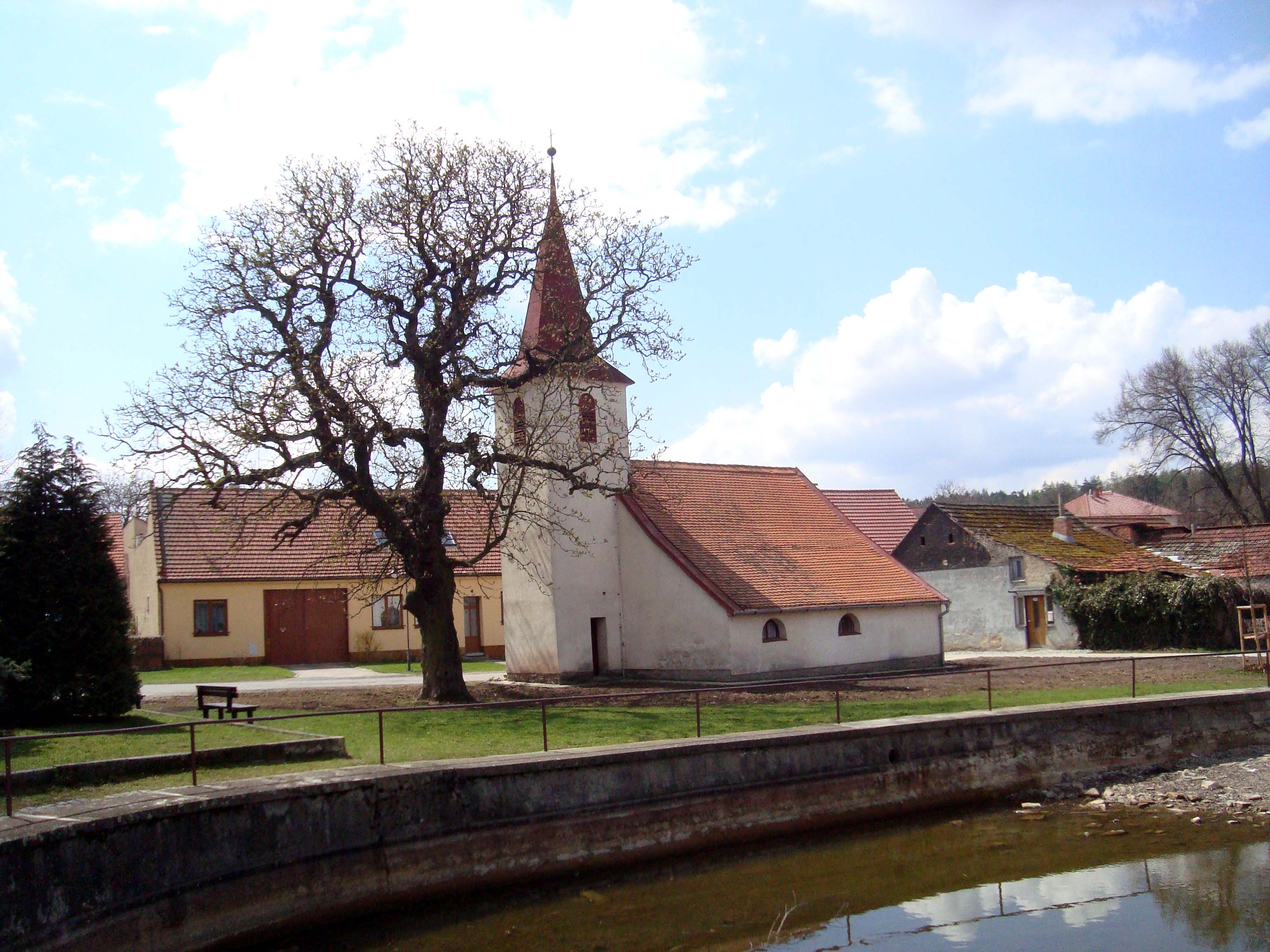
- Centre with the Chapel of St. Anthony of Padua

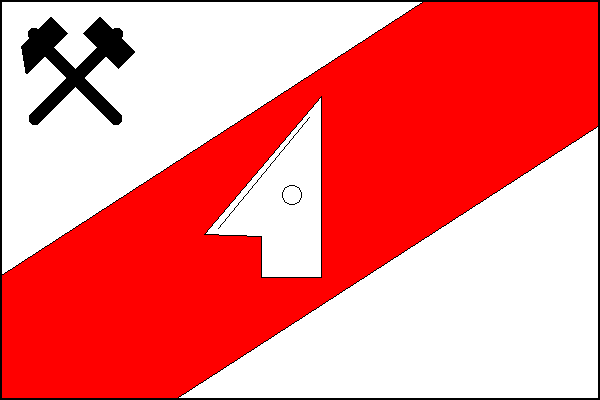
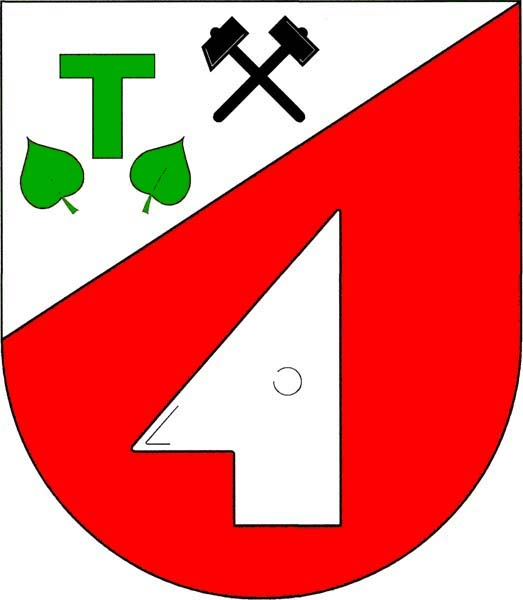
- Flag Coat of arms

- Location in the Czech Republic
- Coordinates: 49°10′23″N 16°21′29″E
- Country: Czech Republic
- Region: South Moravian
- District: Brno-Country
- First mentioned: 1104

Area
  - Total: 5.69 km^{2} (2.20 sq mi)
- Elevation: 370 m (1,210 ft)

Population (2026-01-01)
  - Total: 798
  - Density: 140/km^{2} (363/sq mi)
- Time zone: UTC+1 (CET)
  - Summer (DST): UTC+2 (CEST)
- Postal codes: 664 84
- Website: www.babiceurosic.cz

Babice u Rosic is a municipality and village in Brno-Country District in the South Moravian Region of the Czech Republic. It has about 800 inhabitants.

== Demographics ==
Historical population
Year	Pop.	±%
1869	674	—
1880	652	−3.3%
1890	748	+14.7%
1900	788	+5.3%
1910	900	+14.2%
1921	968	+7.6%
1930	890	−8.1%
1950	808	−9.2%
1961	737	−8.8%
1970	646	−12.3%
1980	559	−13.5%
1991	474	−15.2%
2001	523	+10.3%
2011	659	+26.0%
2021	798	+21.1%
Source: Censuses
