= Babice (Třebíč District) =

- Municipality
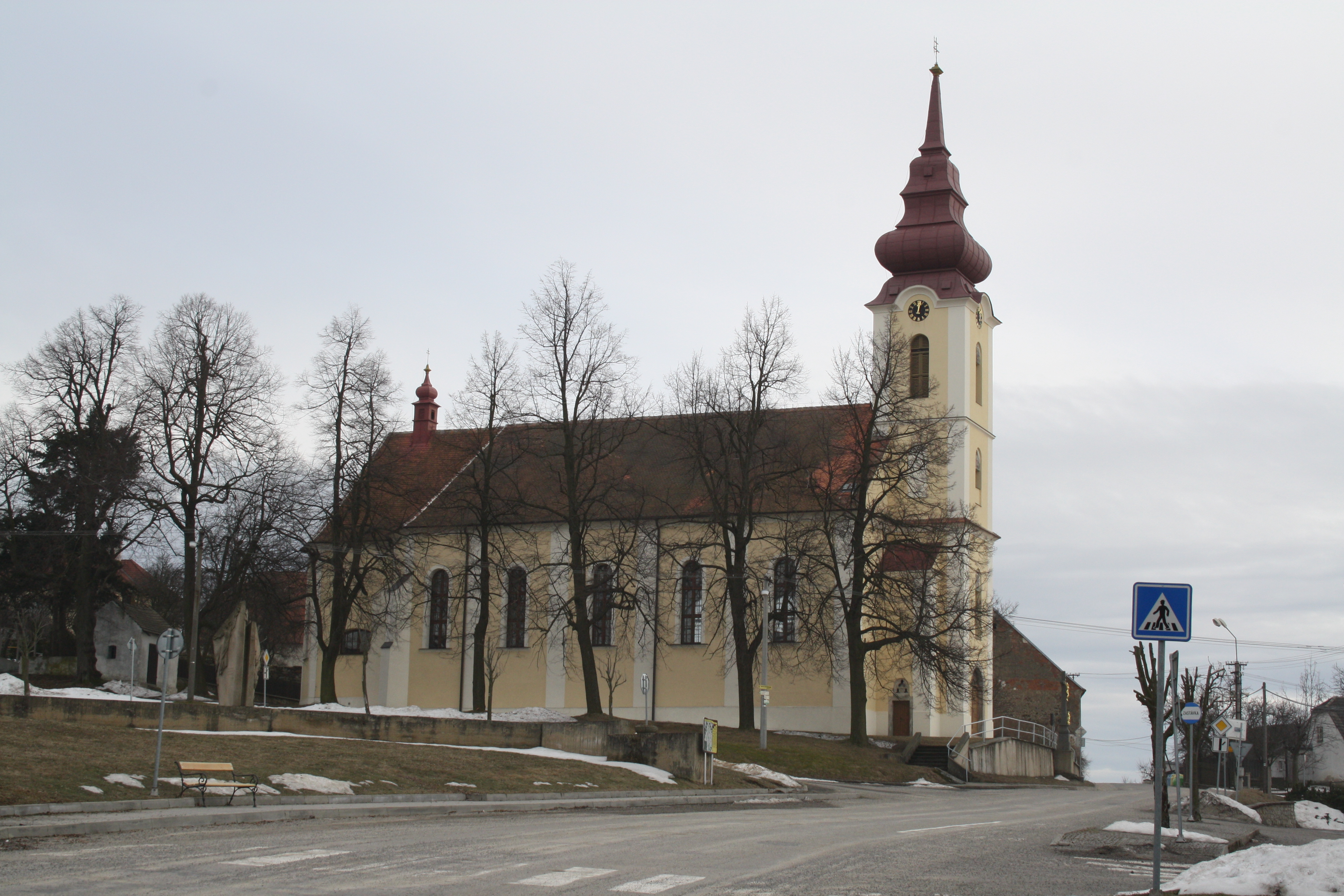
- Church of the Holy Trinity

- Flag Coat of arms

- Location in the Czech Republic
- Coordinates: 49°7′27″N 15°46′8″E
- Country: Czech Republic
- Region: Vysočina
- District: Třebíč
- First mentioned: 1349

Area
  - Total: 9.57 km^{2} (3.69 sq mi)
- Elevation: 545 m (1,788 ft)

Population (2026-01-01)
  - Total: 225
  - Density: 23.5/km^{2} (60.9/sq mi)
- Time zone: UTC+1 (CET)
  - Summer (DST): UTC+2 (CEST)
- Postal code: 675 44
- Website: www.obecbabice.eu

Babice is a municipality and village in Třebíč District in the Vysočina Region of the Czech Republic. It has about 200 inhabitants.

== Administrative division ==
Babice consists of two municipal parts (in brackets population according to the 2021 census):

- Babice (128)
- Bolíkovice (58)

== Geography ==
Babice is located about 12 kilometres (7 mi) southwest of Třebíč and 33 km (21 mi) south of Jihlava. It lies mostly in the Jevišovice Uplands. The northwestern part of the municipal territory extends into the Křižanov Highlands and includes the highest point of Babice at 682 m (2,238 ft) above sea level.

== History ==
The first written mention of Babice is from 1349. The village of Bolíkovice was first mentioned in 1358.

The municipality is known for the Babice Trial where 11 people were sentenced to death in a political trial for the murder of three Communist Party functionaries in the Babice school in 1951.

== Demographics ==
Historical population

Year	Pop.	±%
1869	383	—
1880	416	+8.6%
1890	429	+3.1%
1900	453	+5.6%
1910	425	−6.2%

Year	Pop.	±%
1921	428	+0.7%
1930	371	−13.3%
1950	302	−18.6%
1961	319	+5.6%
1970	293	−8.2%

Year	Pop.	±%
1980	256	−12.6%
1991	230	−10.2%
2001	212	−7.8%
2011	191	−9.9%
2021	186	−2.6%

Source: Censuses

== Transport ==
There are no railways or major roads passing through the municipality.

== Sights ==
The main landmark of Babice is the Church of the Holy Trinity. The first mention of the church is from 1349. In 1614, it burned down and was replaced by a new one. This church had to be demolished in 1863 due to its poor condition, and the current structure was built in the same year.
