= Babice, Opole Voivodeship =

Babice
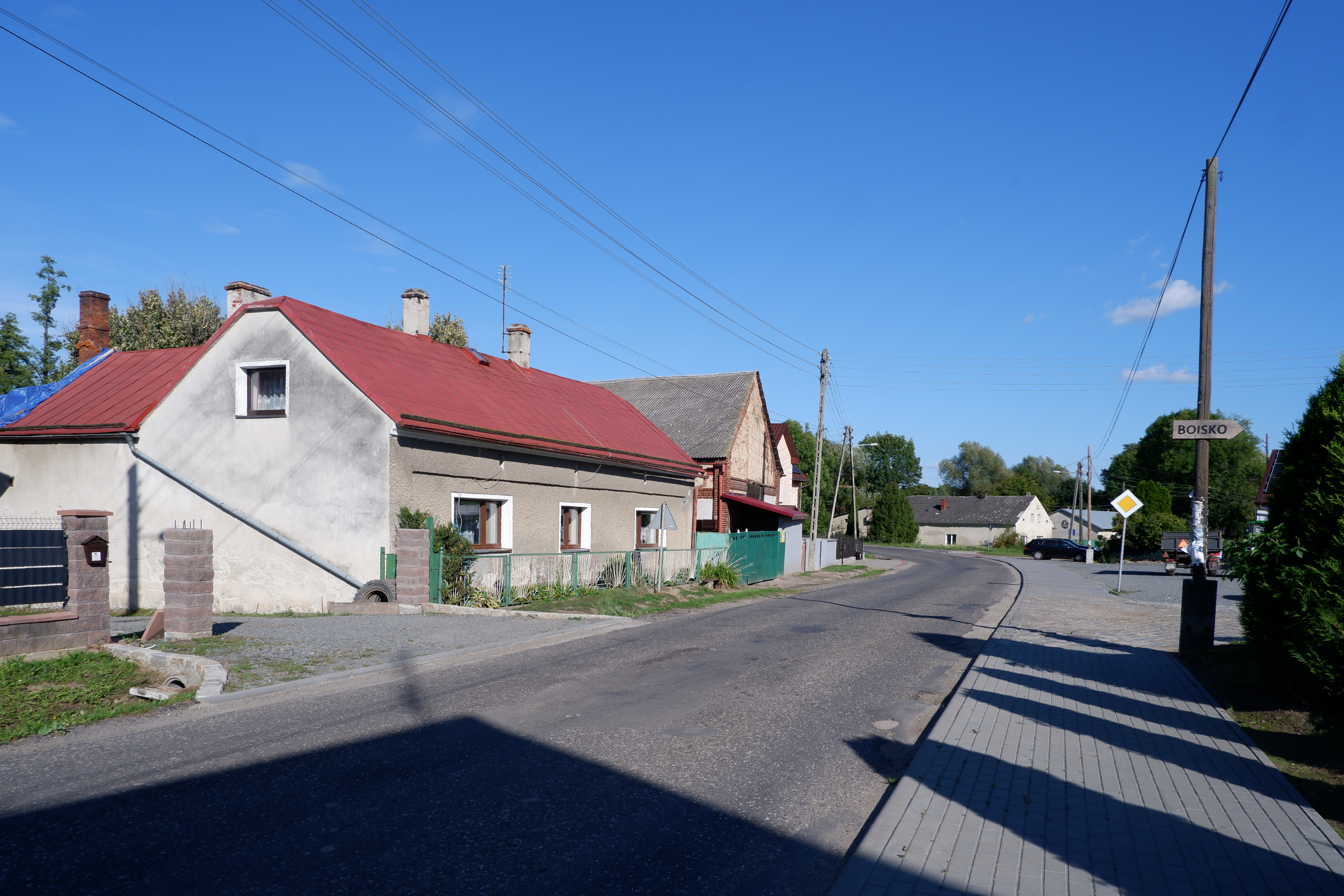

- Location within Poland
- Coordinates: 50°10′18″N 17°54′52″E
- Country: Poland
- Voivodeship: Opole
- County: Głubczyce
- Gmina: Baborów
- Time zone: UTC+1 (CET)
  - Summer (DST): UTC+2 (CEST)
- Area code: +48 77
- Car plates: OGL

Babice [baˈbʲit͡sɛ] is a village in the administrative district of Gmina Baborów, in Głubczyce County, in Opole Voivodeship in southern Poland.
