= Babice (Olomouc District) =

- Municipality
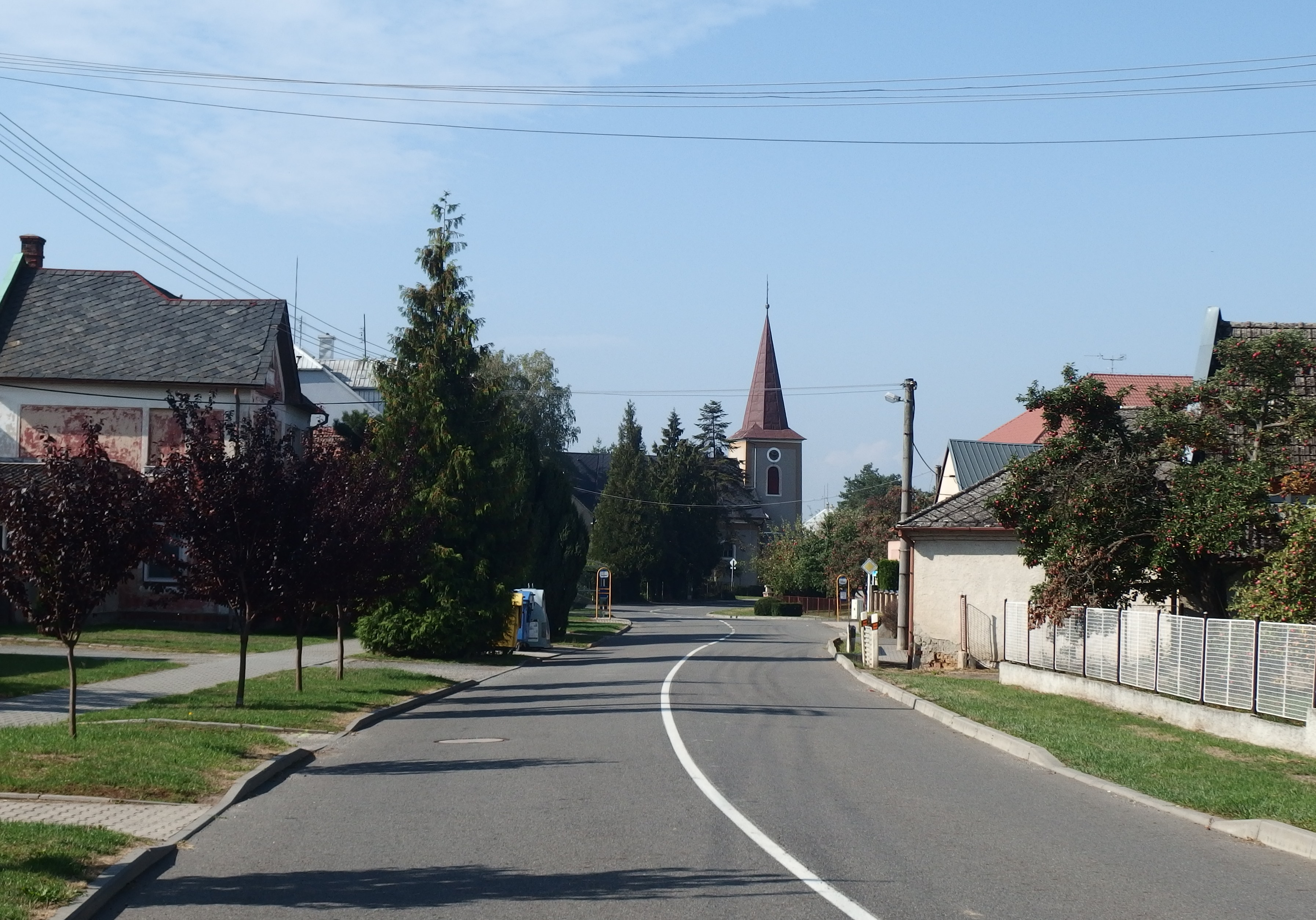
- View towards the Church of All Saints

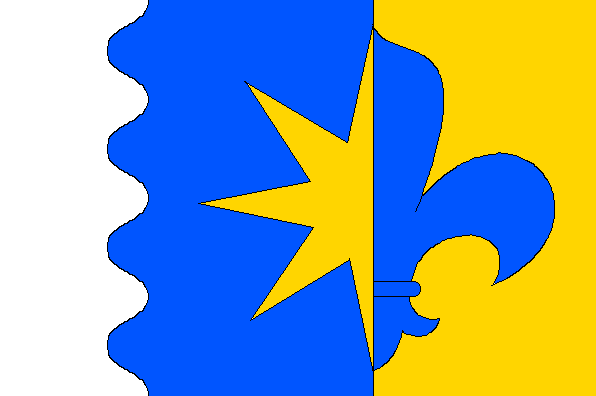
- Flag Coat of arms

- Location in the Czech Republic
- Coordinates: 49°44′16″N 17°15′39″E
- Country: Czech Republic
- Region: Olomouc
- District: Olomouc
- First mentioned: 1339

Area
  - Total: 5.95 km^{2} (2.30 sq mi)
- Elevation: 244 m (801 ft)

Population (2026-01-01)
  - Total: 457
  - Density: 76.8/km^{2} (199/sq mi)
- Time zone: UTC+1 (CET)
  - Summer (DST): UTC+2 (CEST)
- Postal code: 785 01
- Website: www.obecbabice.cz

Babice is a municipality and village in Olomouc District in the Olomouc Region of the Czech Republic. It has about 500 inhabitants.

Babice lies approximately 17 kilometres (11 mi) north of Olomouc and 208 km (129 mi) east of Prague.

== Demographics ==
Historical population
| Year | Pop. | ±% |
|---|---|---|
| 1869 | 612 | — |
| 1880 | 612 | +0.0% |
| 1890 | 581 | −5.1% |
| 1900 | 598 | +2.9% |
| 1910 | 485 | −18.9% |
| 1921 | 512 | +5.6% |
| 1930 | 585 | +14.3% |
| 1950 | 440 | −24.8% |
| 1961 | 465 | +5.7% |
| 1970 | 397 | −14.6% |
| 1980 | 373 | −6.0% |
| 1991 | 394 | +5.6% |
| 2001 | 403 | +2.3% |
| 2011 | 433 | +7.4% |
| 2021 | 457 | +5.5% |
Source: Censuses
