= Alfred Moschkau =

German philatelist and local historian

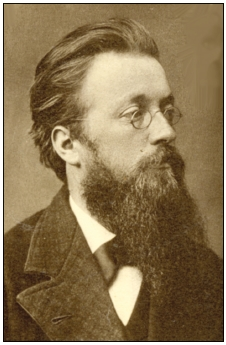
- Born: 24 January 1848
- Died: 27 May 1912 (aged 64)
- Occupation: Historian
- Writing career
- Language: German

Otto Carl Alfred Moschkau (1848-1912) was a German philatelist and local historian. In 2021 he was retrospectively named as one of the fathers of philately.

== Selected publications ==
- Führer durch die Städte Bautzen, Bischofswerda, Camenz, Löbau, Herrnhut, Görlitz, Lauban, Zittau und deren Umgebungen. Dresden 1872 (Digitised version)
- Löbau und dessen Umgebung – ein Führer durch diese alte Vierstadt, auf den Löbauer Berg, Cottmar, Rothstein, Sonneberg, Horken und in die Scala, Dresden 1872 (Digitised version)
- Die von den Oberlausitzer Sechsstädten eroberten und zerstörten Raubburgen der Lausitz, Schlesiens und Böhmens historisch und topographisch beschrieben. Selbstverlag, Zittau 1873 (Digitised version)
- Der Oybin bei Zittau. Seine Beschreibung, Geschichte und Sagen; nebst Führer durch Zittau, auf den Töpfer, Ameisenberg, Brandstein, Carlsfried und Weißbachthal, Pferdeberg, Hochwald, Nonnenklunzen, Lausche u.s.w. Zittau 1875 (Digitised version)
- Führer durch die Oberlausitz, Verlag Louis Senf, Leipzig 1877 (Digitised version)
- Der Carolathurm auf dem Hochwalde bei Zittau. Zittau um 1879 (Digitised version)
- Die Burg Oybin bei Zittau topographisch und historisch beschrieben. Senf, Leipzig 1879 (Digitised version)
- Führer zu den interessantesten Raubburgen der Oberlausitz und Böhmens. Pahl, Zittau 1879 (Digitised version)
- Goethe und Karl August auf dem Oybin bei Zittau vom 28. bis 29. September 1790. Senf, Leipzig 1879 (Digitised version)
- Führer durch die Oberlausitz mit besonderer Berücksichtigung des Zittauer Gebirges (Oybin, Hochwald, Lausche, Isarkamm etc.) und des angrenzenden Böhmens, Leipzig 1880 (Digitised version)
- Archiv für Topographie und Geschichte des Oybin und seiner Umgebung. mehrere Bände, Oybin 1881ff. (Digitised version)
- Der Oybin in vorhistorischer Zeit. Ein Beitrag zur Geschichte des Oybin und des Zittauer Gebirges. Oybin 1882 (Digitised version)
- Burg Tollenstein in Böhmen. Topographie und urkundliche Geschichte. Rumburg 1882 (Digitised version)
- Oybin-Chronik. Urkundliche Geschichte von Burg, Cölestinerkloster und Dorf Oybin bei Zittau. Leipa 1884 (Digitised version)
- Das Kirchlein am Oybin. Menzel, Zittau 1884 (Digitised version)
- Zittau und seine Umgebung. ein Führer durch Zittau, seine nächste Umgebung, in das Zittauer Gebirge und das nördliche Böhmen etc. Zittau 1893 (Digitised version)
