= Buřenice =

- Municipality
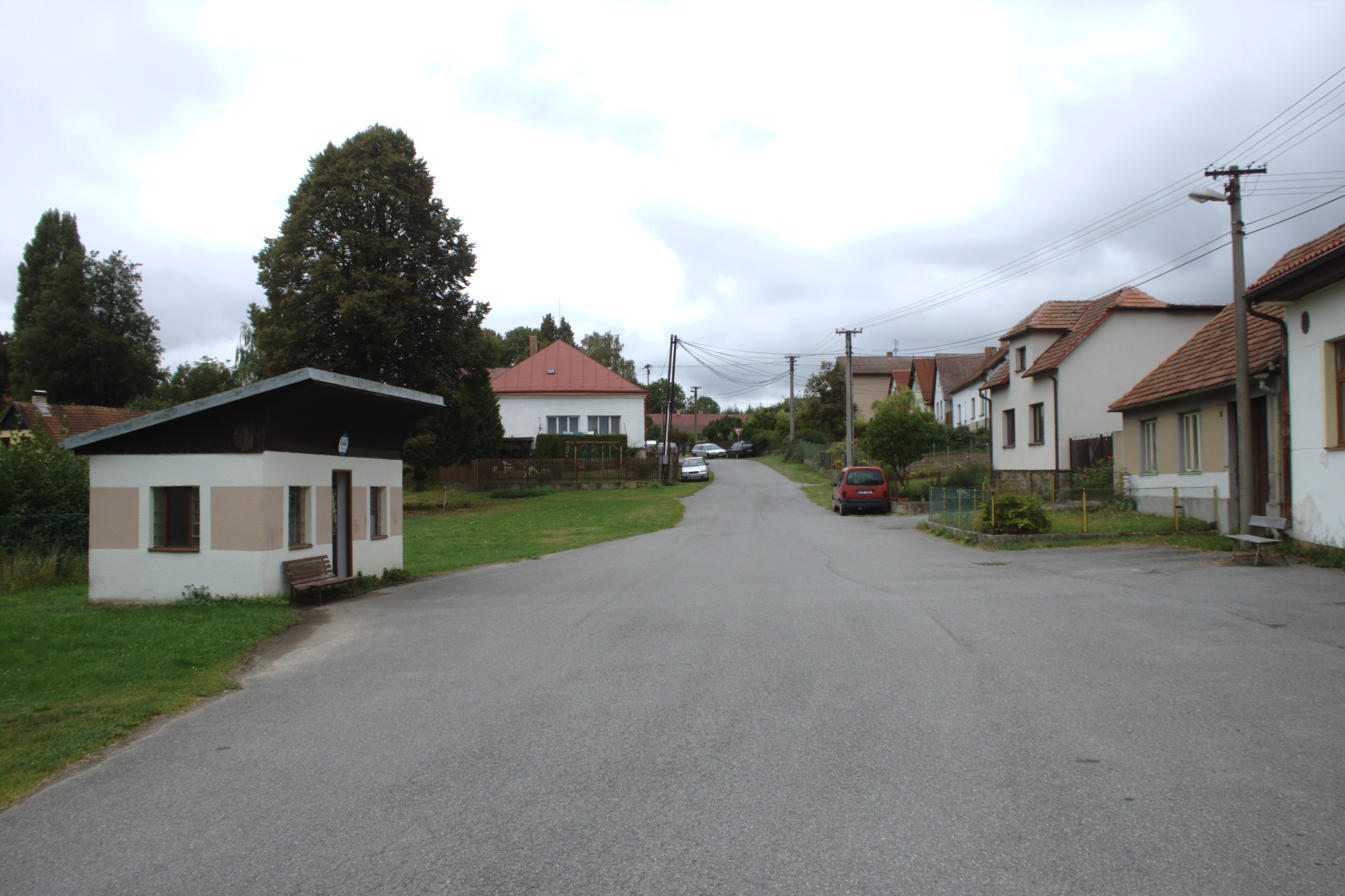
- Main road and bus stop

- Flag Coat of arms

- Location in the Czech Republic
- Coordinates: 49°33′10″N 15°3′59″E
- Country: Czech Republic
- Region: Vysočina
- District: Pelhřimov
- First mentioned: 1292

Area
  - Total: 13.66 km^{2} (5.27 sq mi)
- Elevation: 579 m (1,900 ft)

Population (2026-01-01)
  - Total: 221
  - Density: 16.2/km^{2} (41.9/sq mi)
- Time zone: UTC+1 (CET)
  - Summer (DST): UTC+2 (CEST)
- Postal code: 395 01
- Website: www.burenice.cz

Buřenice is a municipality and village in Pelhřimov District in the Vysočina Region of the Czech Republic. It has about 200 inhabitants.

== Administrative division ==
Buřenice consists of four municipal parts (in brackets population according to the 2021 census):

- Buřenice (114)
- Babice (44)
- Kyjov (3)
- Radějov (46)

== Etymology ==
The name Buřenice is derived from the personal name Buřeň (a variation of Burian), meaning "the village of Buřeň's people".

== Geography ==
Buřenice is located about 17 kilometres (11 mi) northwest of Pelhřimov and 40 km (25 mi) northwest of Jihlava. It lies in the Křemešník Highlands. The highest point is near the top of the hill Na Altánku at 632 m (2,073 ft) above sea level. The municipal territory is rich in small fishponds, supplied by the stream Předožlabský potok and its tributaries.

== History ==
The first written mention of Buřenice is from 1292.

== Demographics ==
Historical population

Year	Pop.	±%
1869	900	—
1880	948	+5.3%
1890	936	−1.3%
1900	882	−5.8%
1910	849	−3.7%

Year	Pop.	±%
1921	834	−1.8%
1930	718	−13.9%
1950	493	−31.3%
1961	473	−4.1%
1970	413	−12.7%

Year	Pop.	±%
1980	329	−20.3%
1991	257	−21.9%
2001	220	−14.4%
2011	199	−9.5%
2021	207	+4.0%

Source: Censuses

== Transport ==
There are no railways or major roads passing through the municipality.

== Sights ==
The main landmark of Buřenice is the Church of Saints Simon and Jude. Its current appearance is the result of a neo-Romanesque reconstruction, but it has medieval origins.
