= Baborów =

- Town
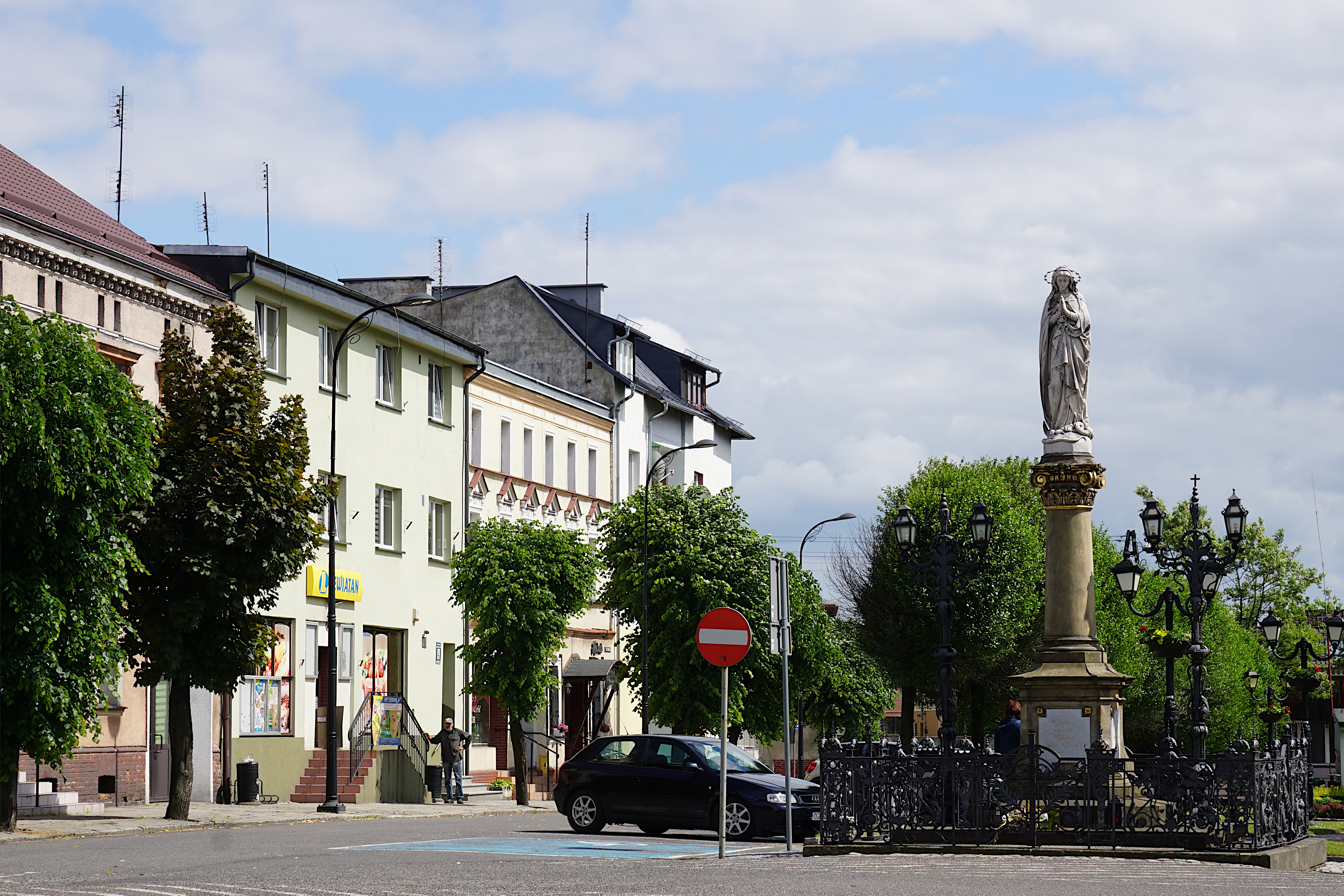
- Main square of Baborów

- Coat of arms

- Location within Poland
- Coordinates: 50°09′27″N 17°59′07″E
- Country: Poland
- Voivodeship: Opole
- County: Głubczyce
- Gmina: Baborów

Government
  - Mayor: Tomasz Krupa

Area
  - Total: 11.86 km^{2} (4.58 sq mi)

Population (30 June 2022)
  - Total: 2,852
  - Density: 240/km^{2} (620/sq mi)
- Time zone: UTC+1 (CET)
  - Summer (DST): UTC+2 (CEST)
- Postal code: 48-120
- Area code: +48 77
- Number plates: OGL
- Website: http://www.baborow.pl

Baborów [baˈbɔruf] (German: Bauerwitz; Silesian: Baborůw) is a town in Gmina Baborów, Głubczyce County, Opole Voivodeship, southern Poland. The town has an area of 11.86 square kilometres (4.58 square miles), and as of June 2022 it has a population of 2,852. Baborów lies on the river Psina.

== History ==
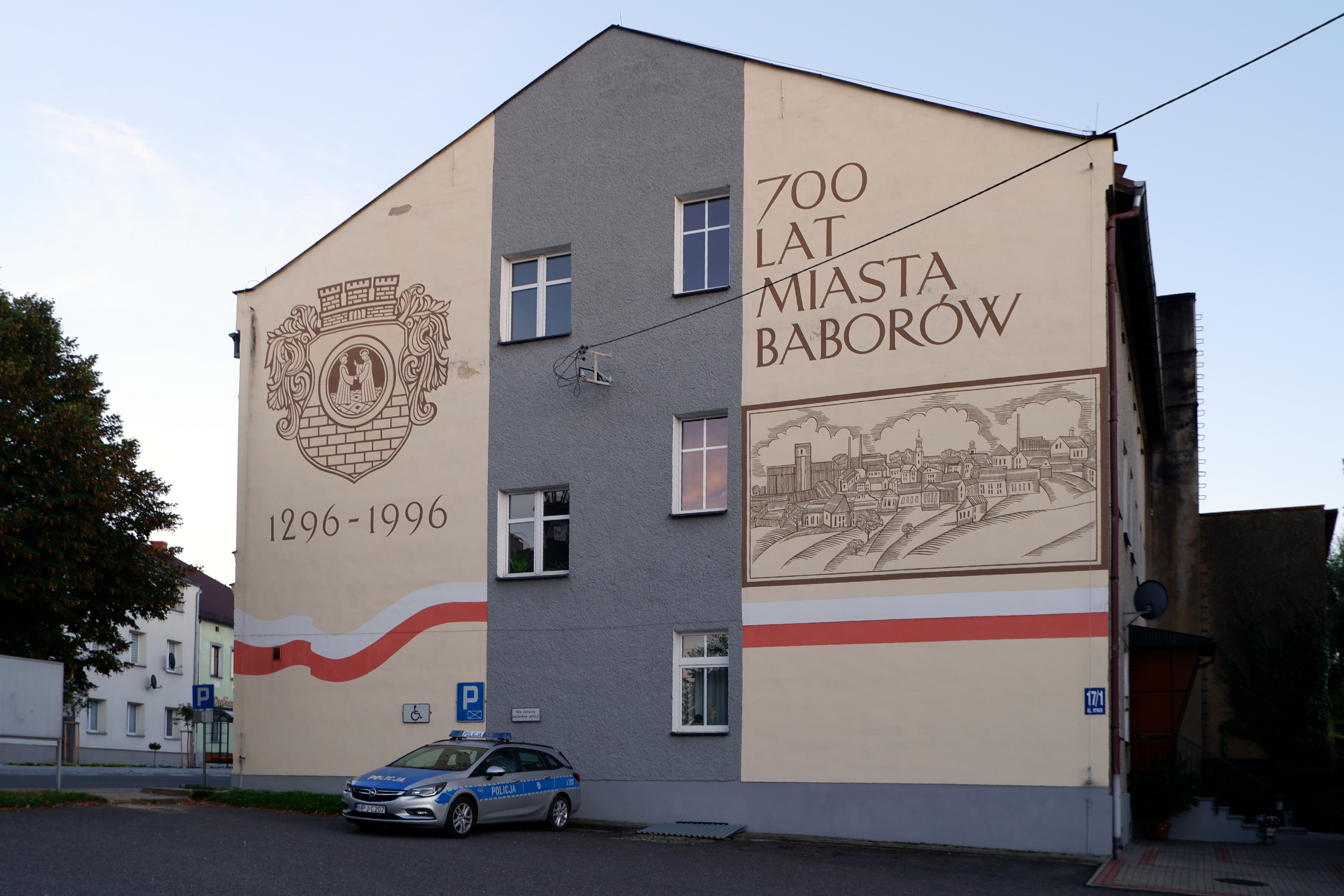
Mural celebrating the 700th anniversary of Baborów

The first mention of the town comes from 1296 in which a wójt Jarosław is mentioned. The town was most likely founded by a Bohemian magnate, Bavor (Babor). Later it was part of an independent duchy, Habsburg-ruled Bohemia, the Kingdom of Prussia and from 1871 and 1945 also of united Germany. After the defeat of Nazi Germany in World War II it became part of Poland. It was granted town rights before 1340, although deprived of them from 1575 to 1718. In the 18th century, Baborów belonged to the tax inspection region of Prudnik.

According to the German census of 1890, the town had a population of 2,707, of which 2,220 (82%) were Czechs. It marked the 19th-century linguistic border between German, Polish, and Czech.

During World War II, the town, then known as Bauerwitz, was the base for two working parties (E288 and E398) of British and Commonwealth prisoners of war, under the administration of the German Stalag VIII-B/344 POW camp. In January 1945, as the Soviet armies resumed their offensive and advanced from the east, the prisoners were marched by the Germans westward in the so-called Long March or Death March. Many of them died from the bitter cold and exhaustion. The lucky ones got far enough to the west to be liberated by the allied armies after some four months of travelling on foot in appalling conditions. The town's German population was interned in Łambinowice camp, and expelled.

== Notable people ==
- Kazimierz Szczygielski (1946–2019), Polish geographer and politician, member of the Polish Sejm.

== International relations ==
=== Twin towns – sister cities ===
See twin towns of Gmina Baborów.

== Gallery ==
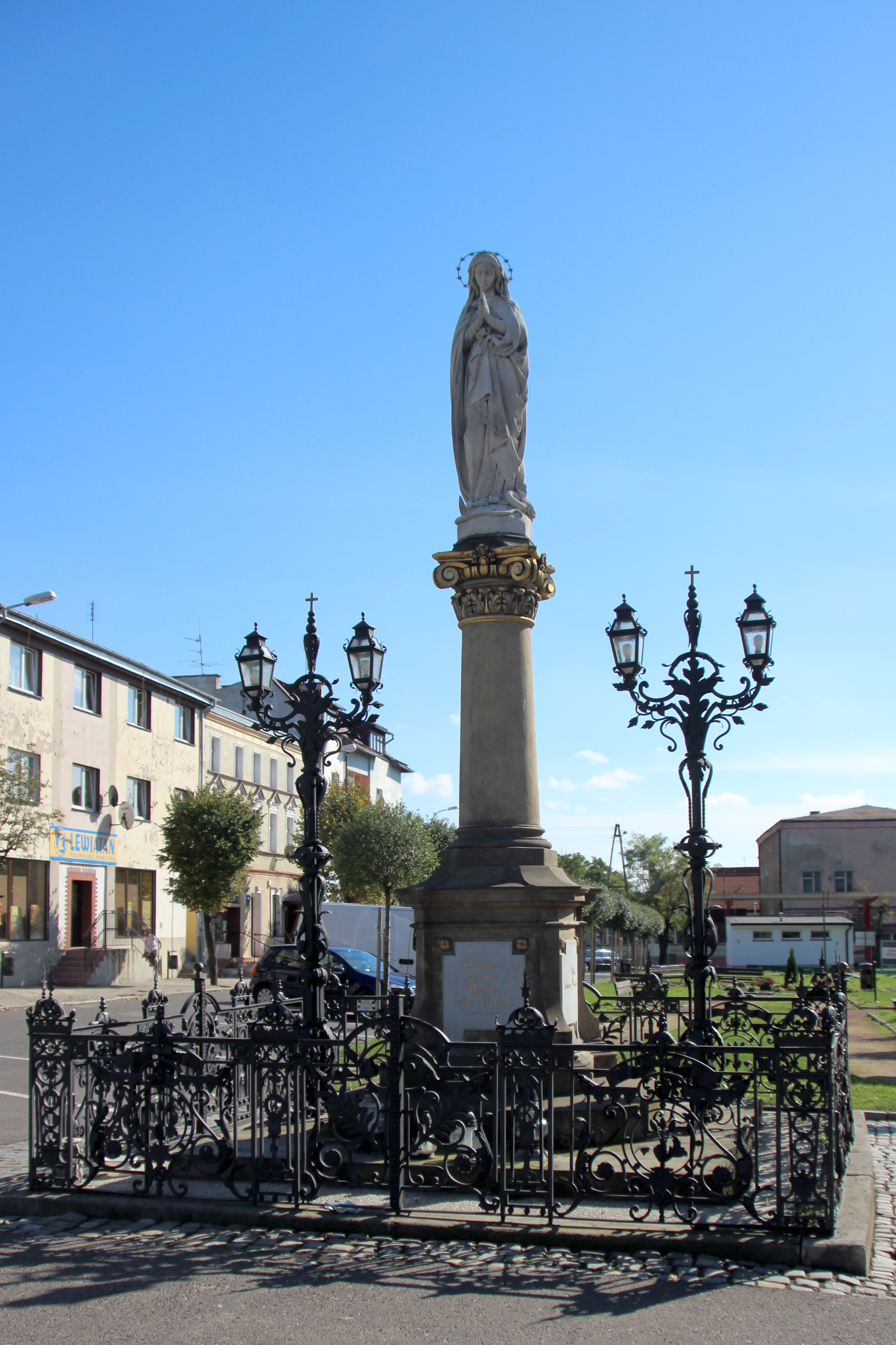
St. Mary column

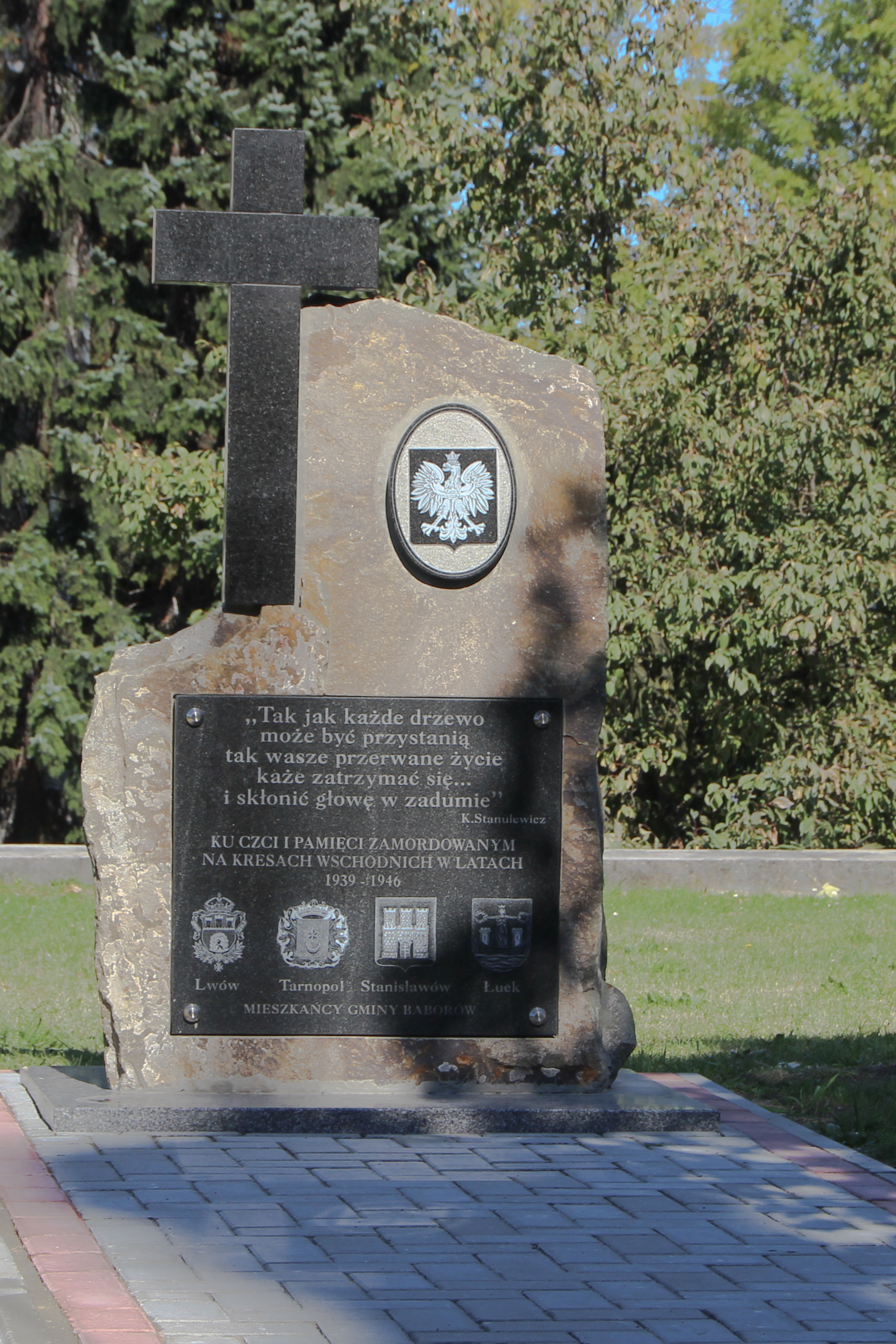
World War II memorial

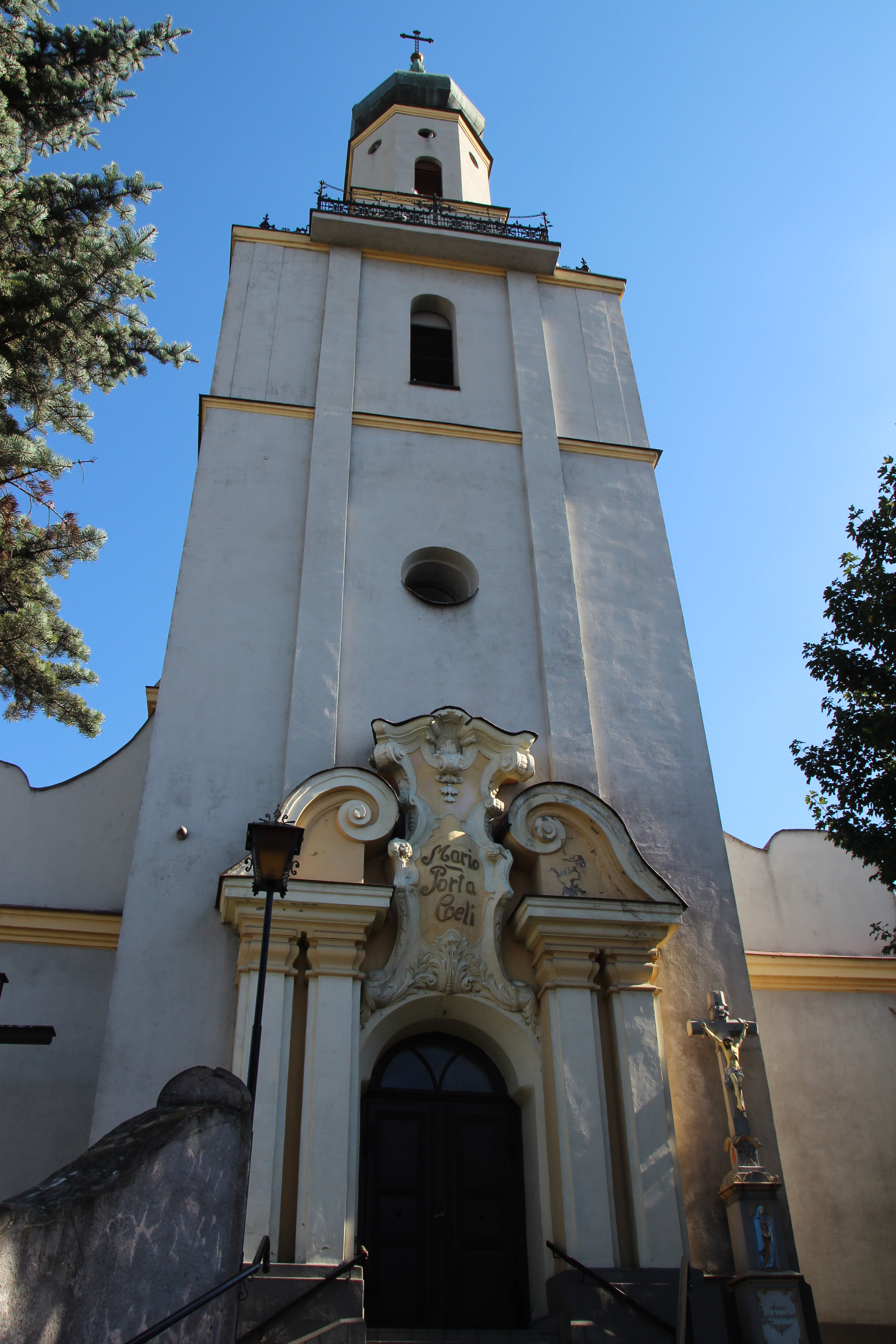
Assumption of Mary Church

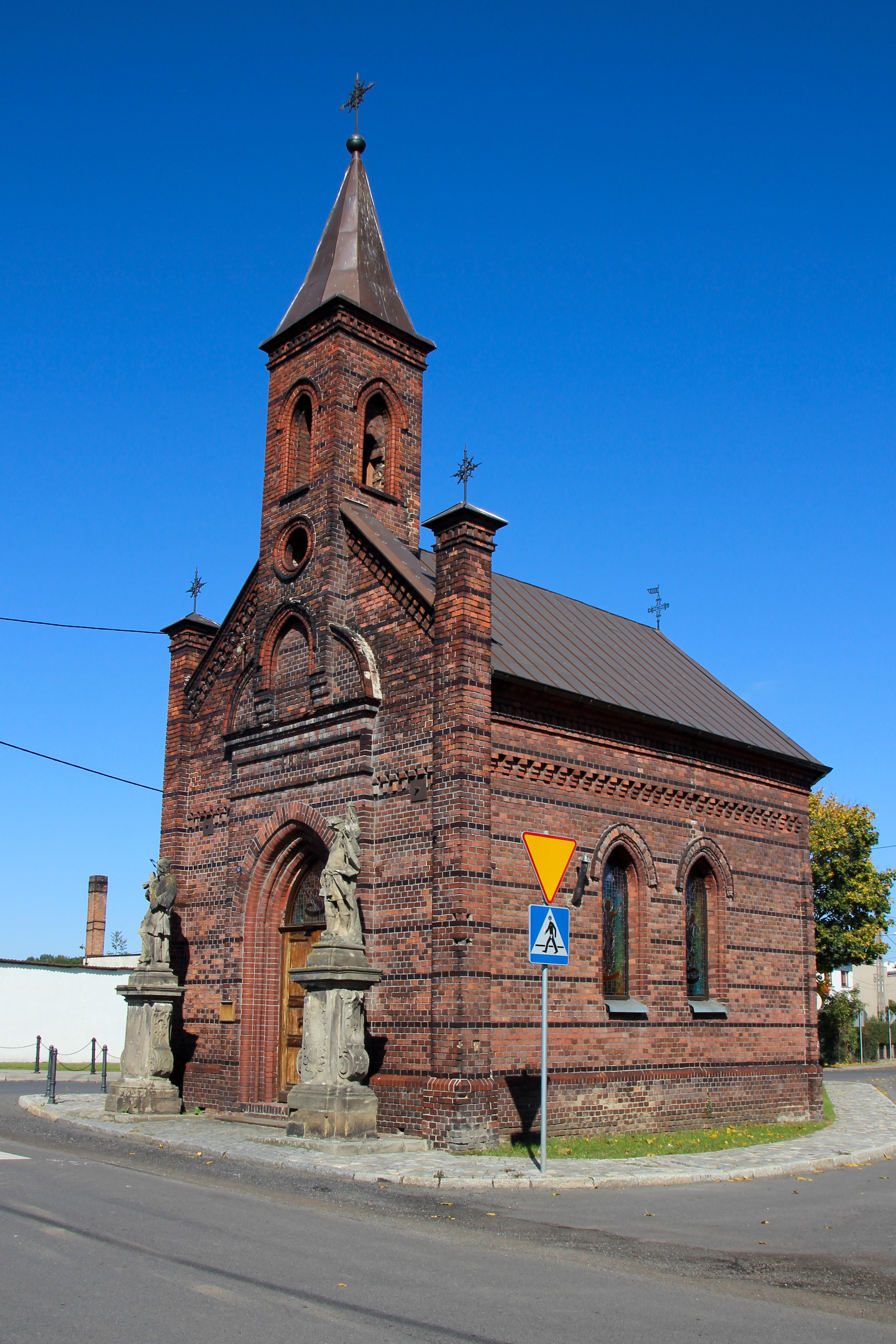
Sacred Heart Chapel
