= Zawiszyce =

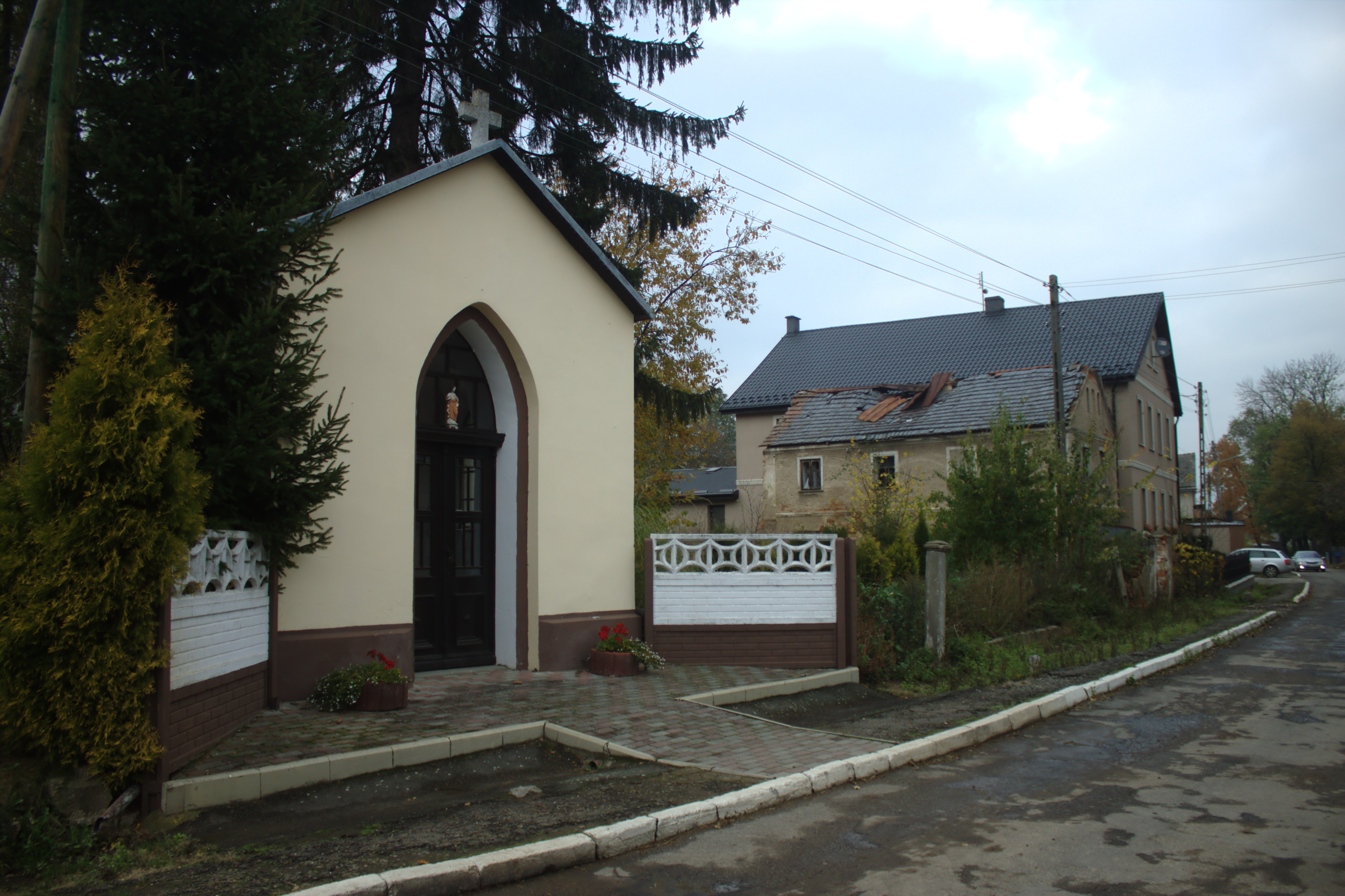
- Chapel

- Location within Poland
- Coordinates: 50°14′22″N 17°51′29″E
- Country: Poland
- Voivodeship: Opole
- County: Głubczyce
- Gmina: Głubczyce
- Time zone: UTC+1 (CET)
  - Summer (DST): UTC+2 (CEST)
- Area code: +48 77
- Car plates: OGL

Zawiszyce [zaviˈʂɨt͡sɛ] is a village located in south-western Poland, in the Opole Voivodeship, Głubczyce County and Gmina Głubczyce.

== Gallery ==
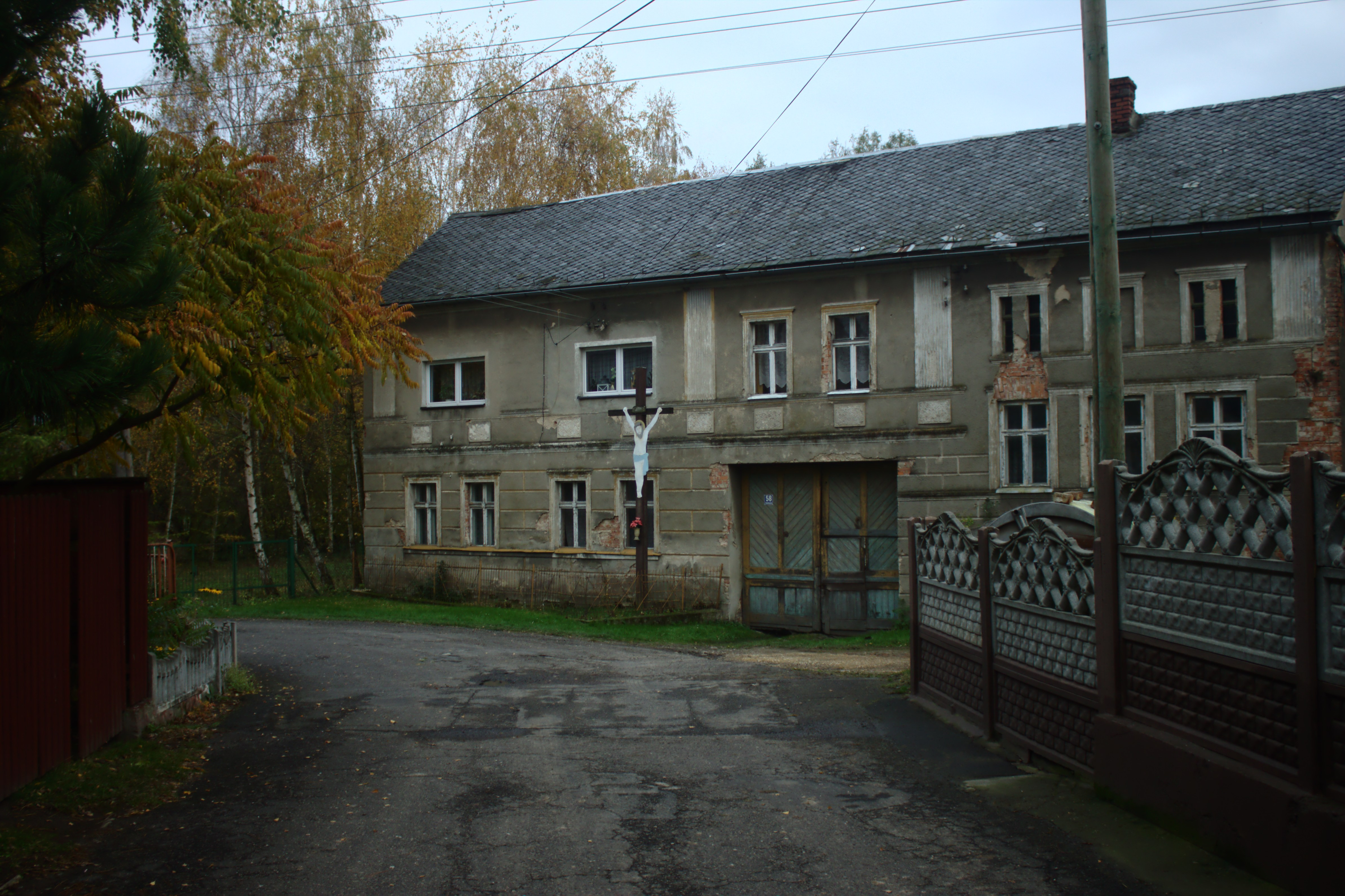
House

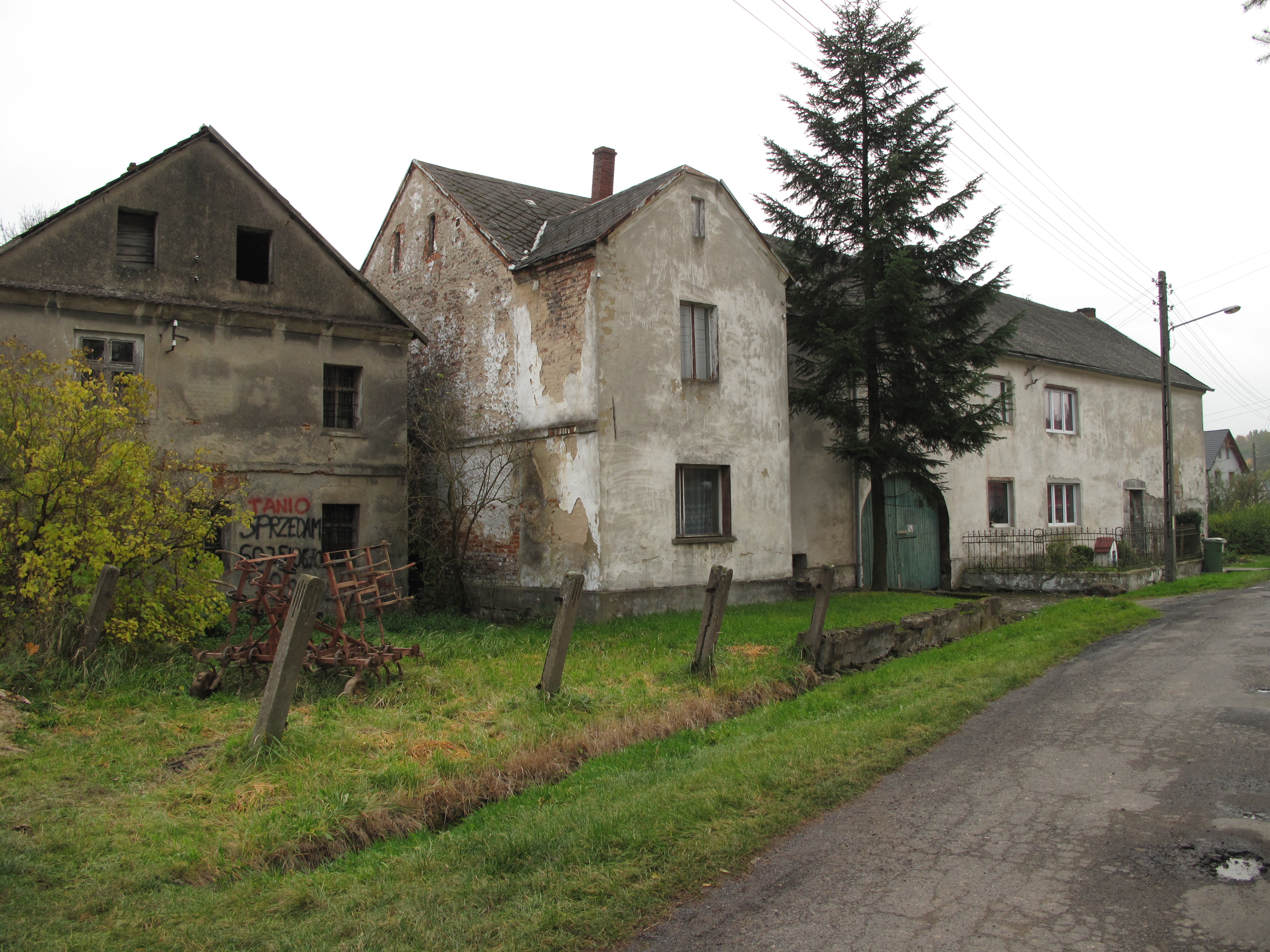
Houses

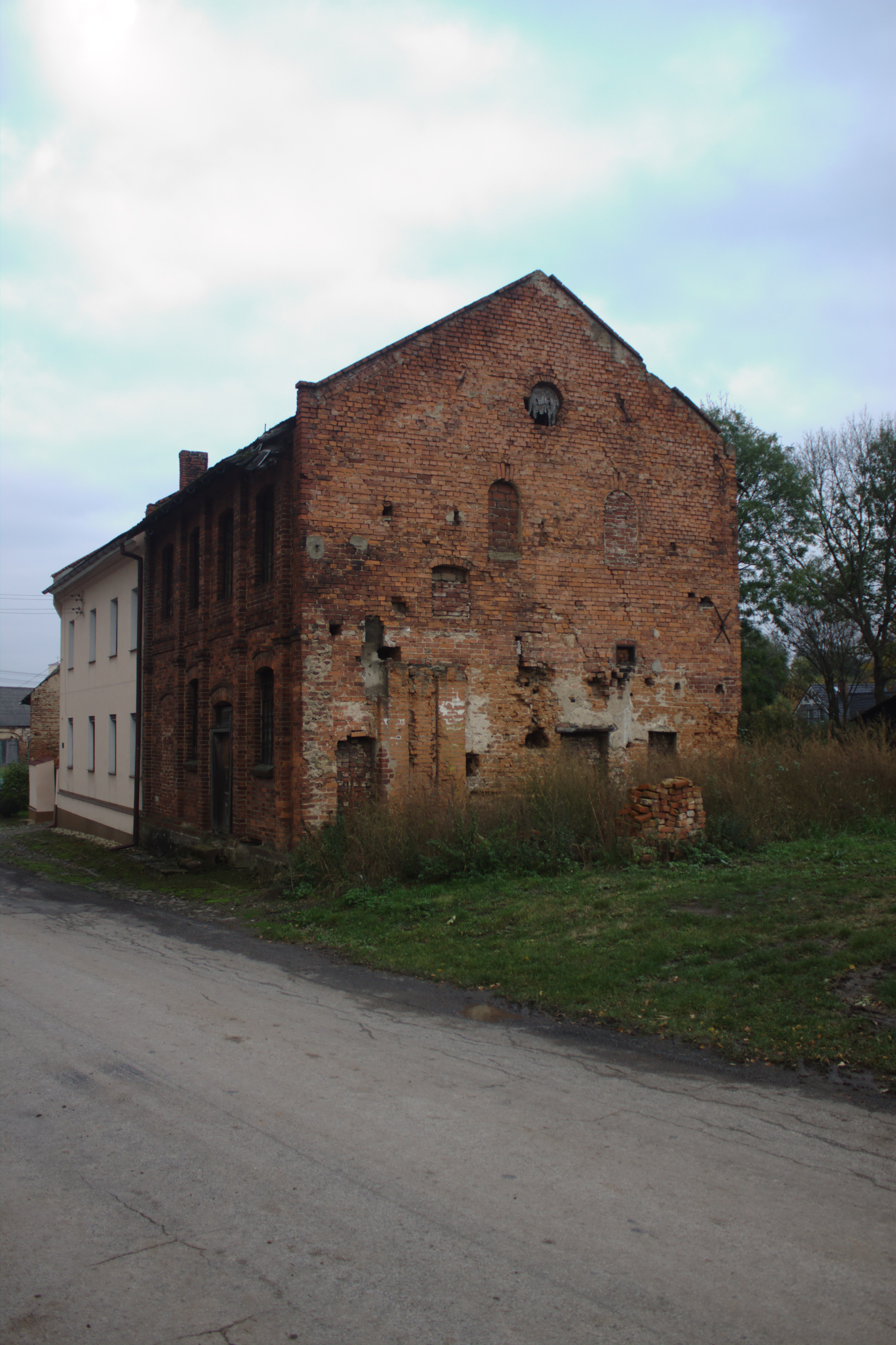
Brick house
