= Pomorzowiczki =

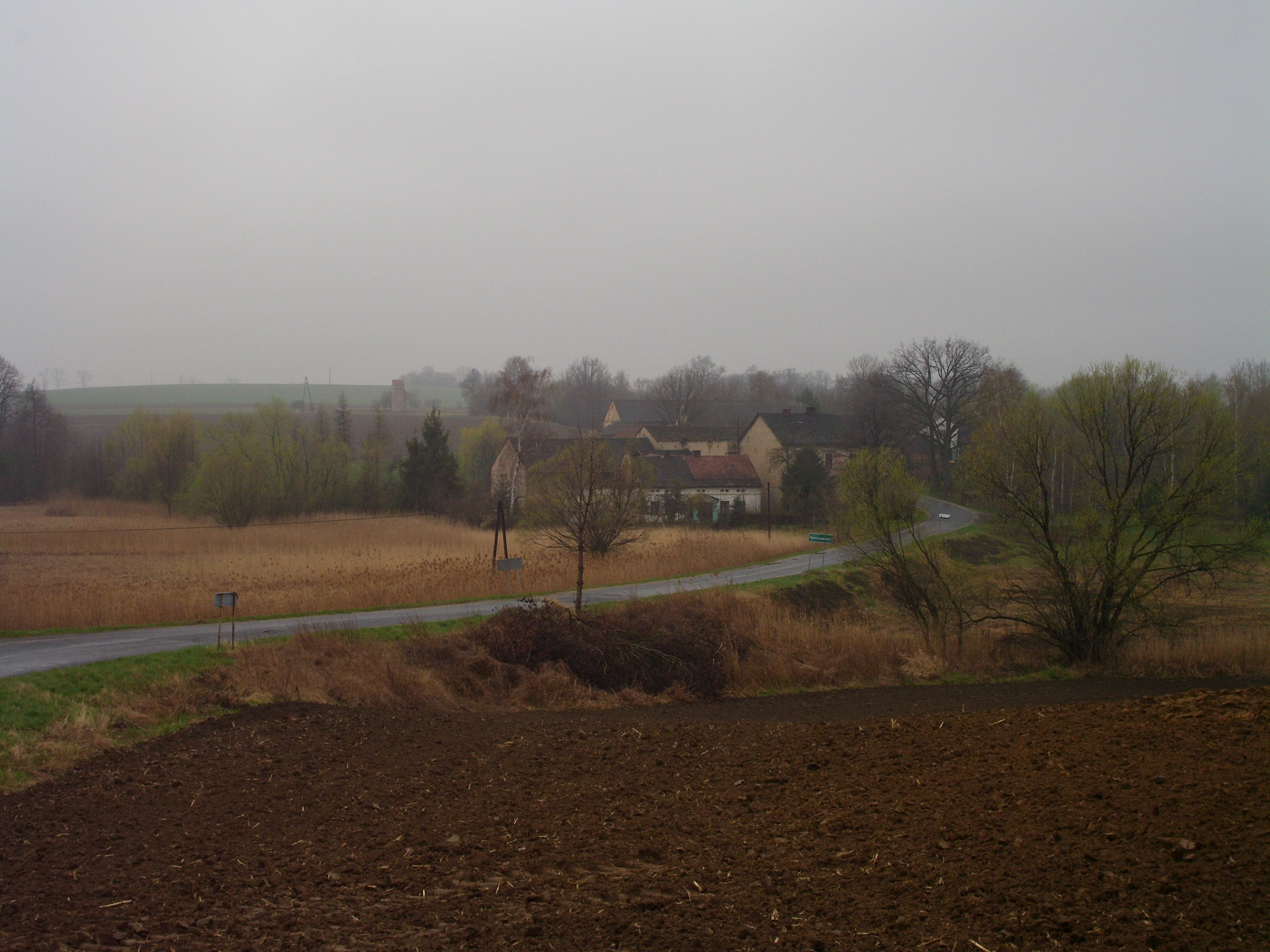
- Pomorzowiczki from the North-East

- Location within Poland
- Coordinates: 50°16′13″N 17°44′13″E
- Country: Poland
- Voivodeship: Opole
- County: Głubczyce
- Gmina: Głubczyce
- Time zone: UTC+1 (CET)
  - Summer (DST): UTC+2 (CEST)
- Postal code: 48-113
- Area code: +48 77
- Car plates: OGL

Pomorzowiczki [pɔmɔʐɔˈvit͡ʂki] is a village located in Poland, Opole Voivodeship, Głubczyce County, Gmina Głubczyce, near the border with the Czech Republic.
