= Radynia =

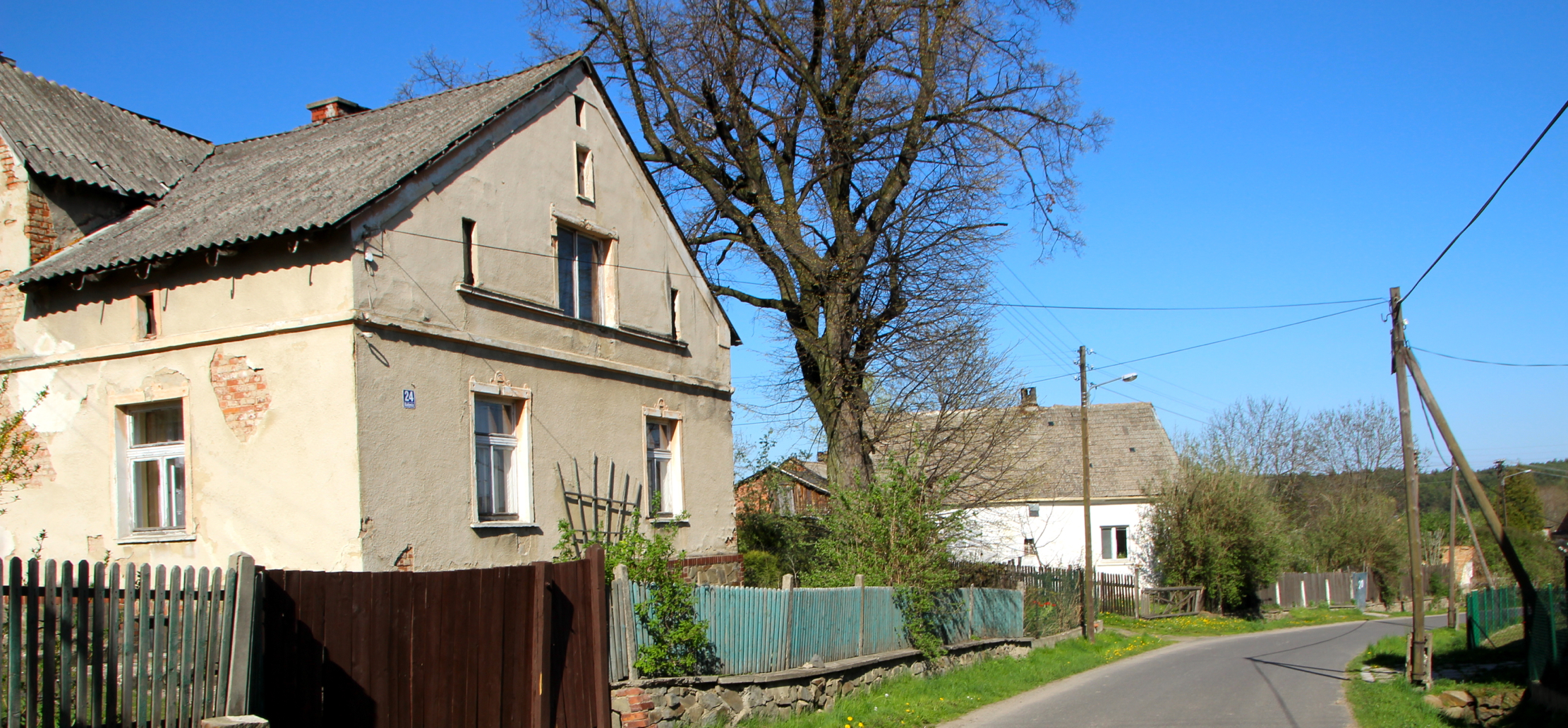

- Location within Poland
- Coordinates: 50°9′N 17°40′E
- Country: Poland
- Voivodeship: Opole
- County: Głubczyce
- Gmina: Głubczyce
- Time zone: UTC+1 (CET)
  - Summer (DST): UTC+2 (CEST)
- Area code: +48 77
- Car plates: OGL

Radynia [raˈdɨɲa] is a village located in Poland, in the Opole Voivodeship, Głubczyce County and Gmina Głubczyce.
