= Biernatówek =

- Village
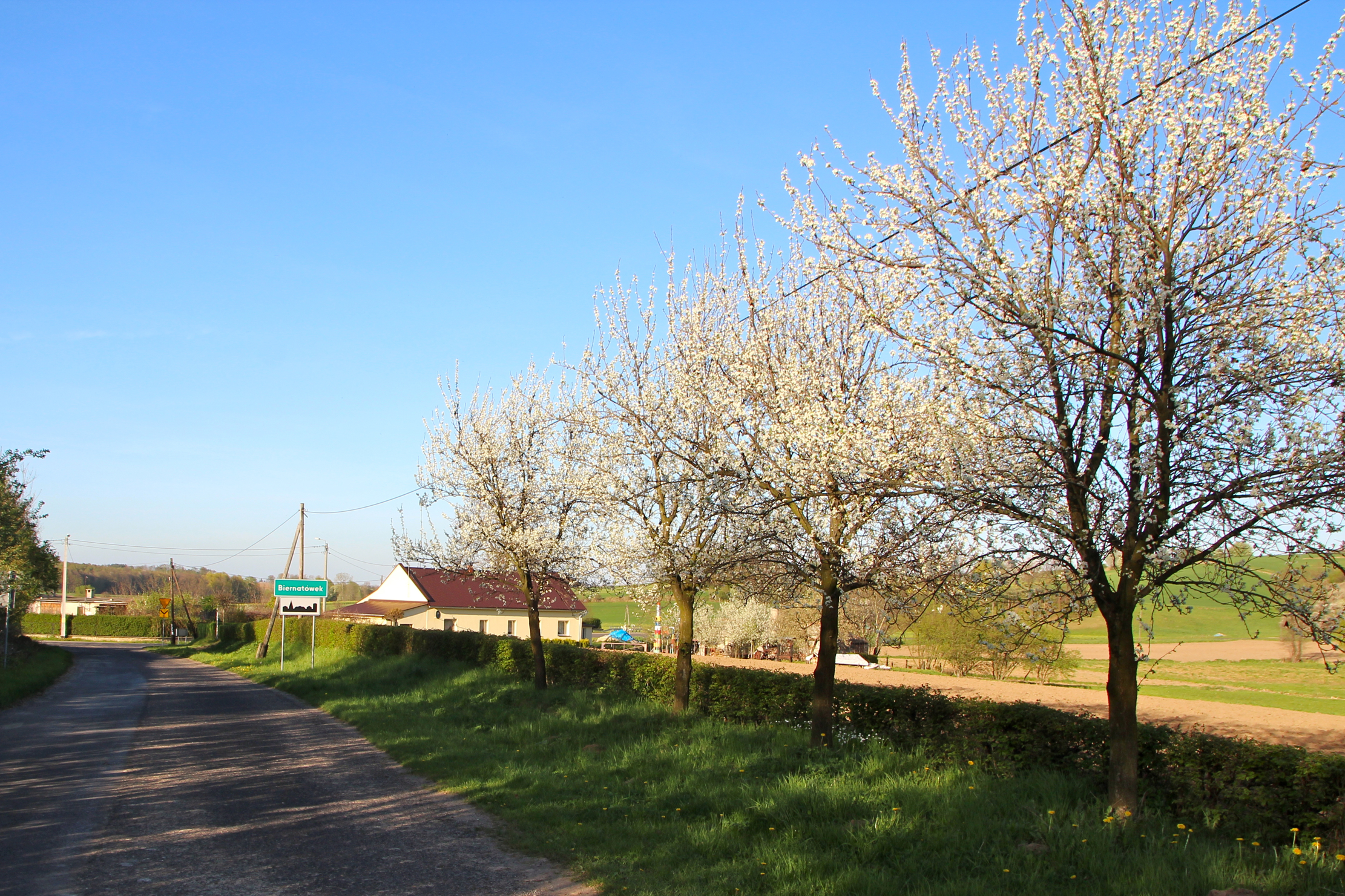

- Location within Poland
- Coordinates: 50°16′31″N 17°51′36″E
- Country: Poland
- Voivodeship: Opole
- County: Głubczyce
- Gmina: Głubczyce

Biernatówek [bjɛrnaˈtuvɛk] is a village in the administrative district of Gmina Głubczyce, within Głubczyce County, Opole Voivodeship, in south-western Poland.
