= Bogdanowice Kolonia =

- Village
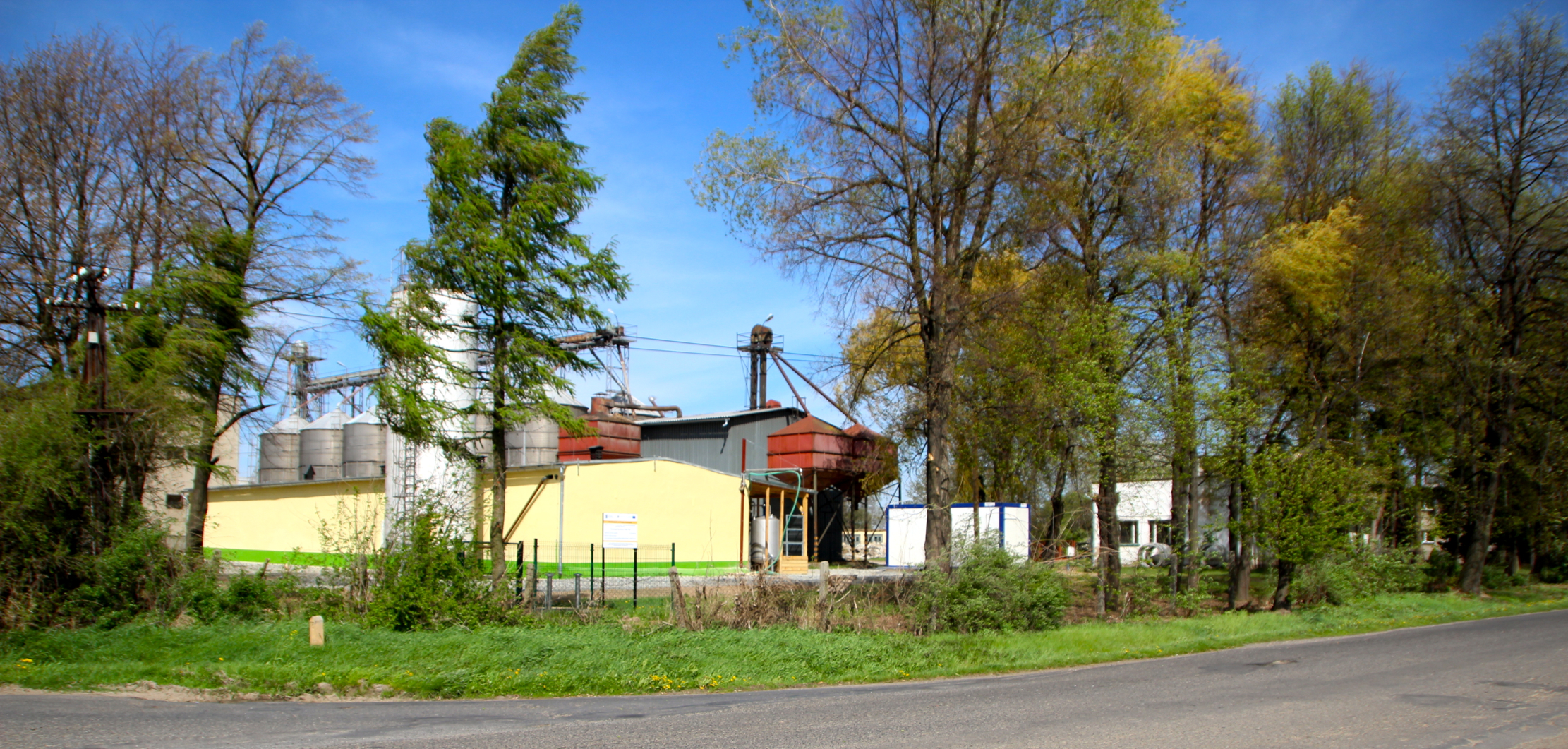

- Location within Poland
- Coordinates: 50°08′26″N 17°49′28″E
- Country: Poland
- Voivodeship: Opole
- County: Głubczyce
- Gmina: Głubczyce

Bogdanowice Kolonia [bɔɡdanɔˈvit͡sɛ kɔˈlɔɲa] is a village in the administrative district of Gmina Głubczyce, within Głubczyce County, Opole Voivodeship, in south-western Poland.
