= Głubczyce Sady =

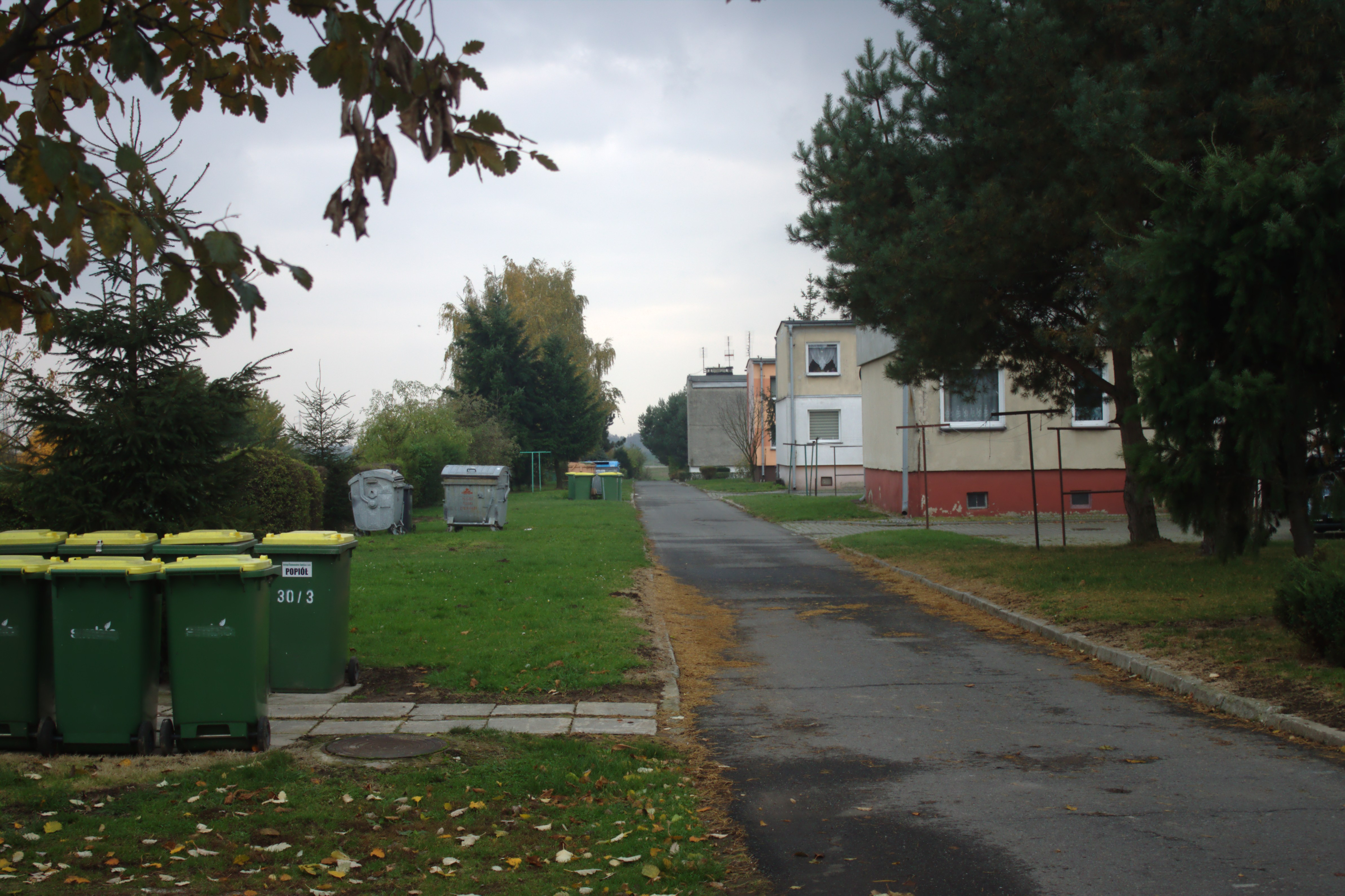
- Road with houses

- Location within Poland
- Coordinates: 50°13′46″N 17°49′18″E
- Country: Poland
- Voivodeship: Opole
- County: Głubczyce
- Gmina: Głubczyce

Population (2006)
  - Total: 550
- Time zone: UTC+1 (CET)
  - Summer (DST): UTC+2 (CEST)
- Postal code: 48-100
- Area code: +48 77
- Car plates: OGL

Głubczyce Sady [ɡwupˈt͡ʂɨt͡sɛ ˈsadɨ] is a village located in Poland, in the Opole Voivodeship, Głubczyce County and Gmina Głubczyce.

== Gallery ==
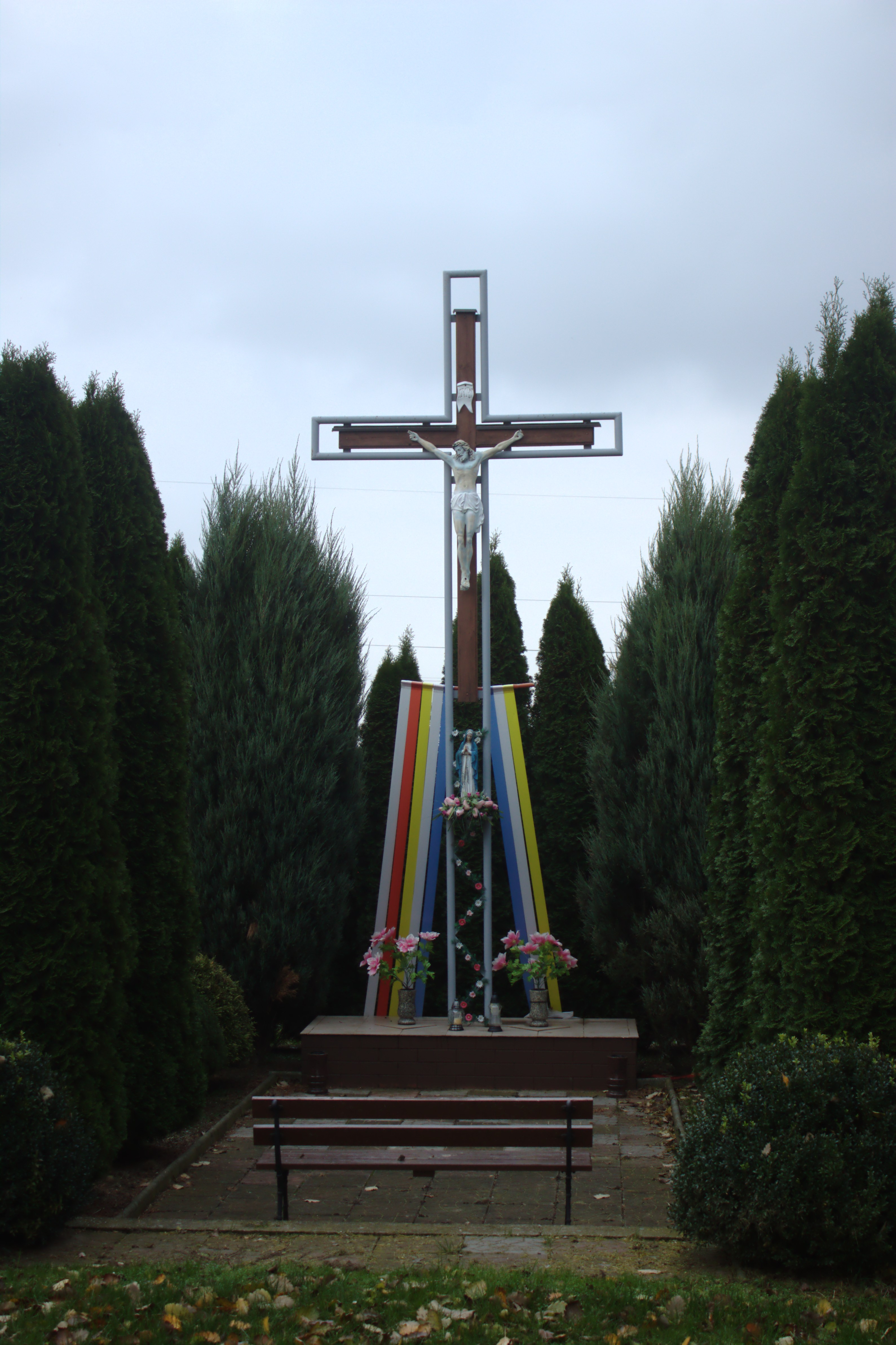
Cross

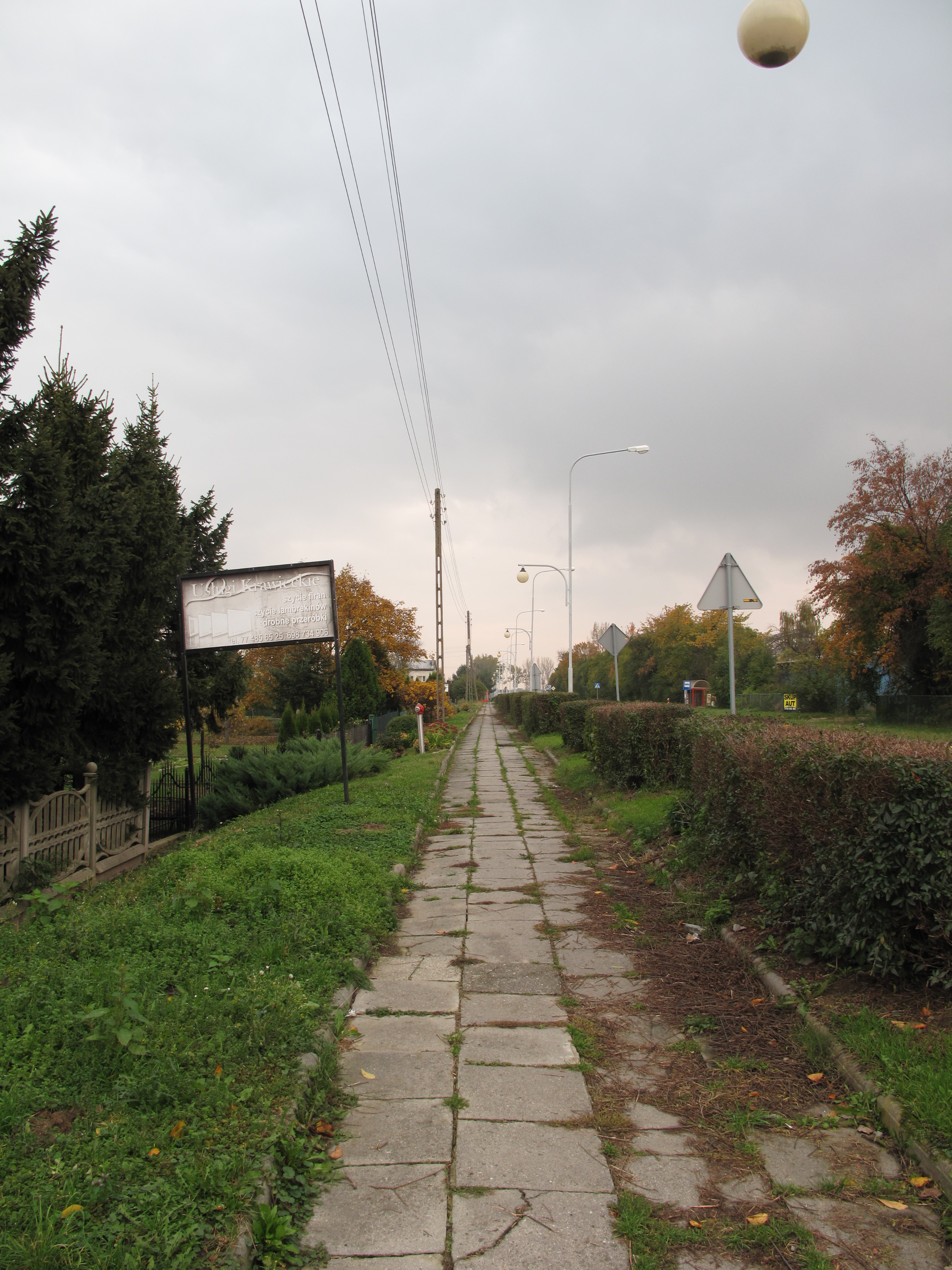
Pavement

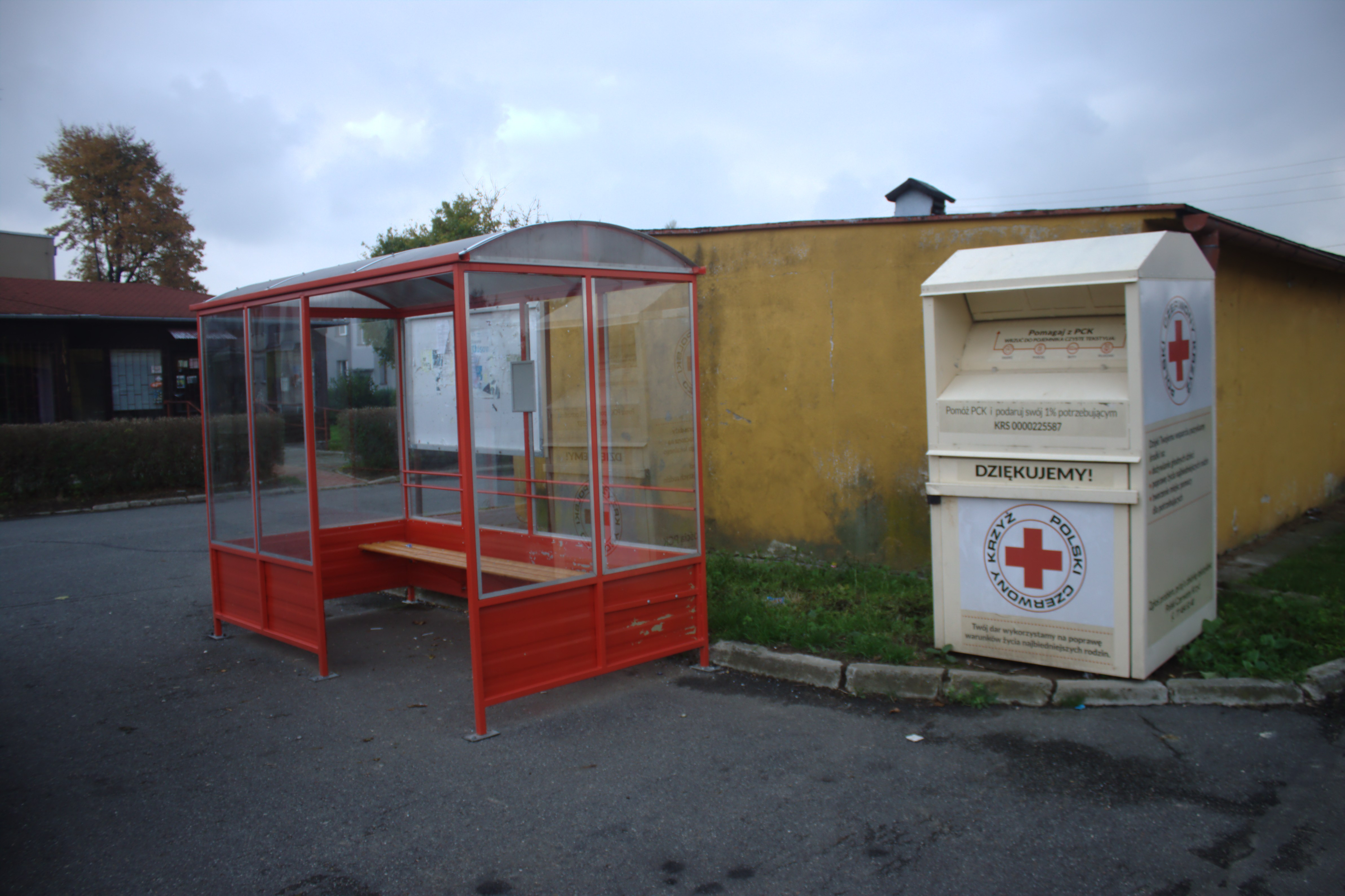
Bus stop shed
