= Zopowy-Osiedle =

- Location within Poland
- Coordinates: 50°10′04″N 17°45′11″E
- Country: Poland
- Voivodeship: Opole
- County: Głubczyce
- Gmina: Głubczyce
- Time zone: UTC+1 (CET)
  - Summer (DST): UTC+2 (CEST)
- Area code: +48 77
- Car plates: OGL

Zopowy-Osiedle [zɔˈpɔvɨ ɔˈɕɛdlɛ] is a village located in Poland, in Opole Voivodeship, Głubczyce County and Gmina Głubczyce.
