= Nowe Gołuszowice =

- Location within Poland
- Coordinates: 50°11′1″N 17°47′38″E
- Country: Poland
- Voivodeship: Opole
- County: Głubczyce
- Gmina: Głubczyce
- Time zone: UTC+1 (CET)
  - Summer (DST): UTC+2 (CEST)
- Area code: +48 77
- Car plates: OGL

Nowe Gołuszowice [ˈnɔvɛ ɡɔwuʂɔˈvit͡sɛ] is a village located in Poland, in the Opole Voivodeship, Głubczyce County and Gmina Głubczyce.
