= Mokre =

Mokre may refer to:

- Mokré, a municipality and village in the Czech Republic
- Mokre, Greater Poland Voivodeship (west-central Poland)
- Mokre, Grudziądz County in Kuyavian-Pomeranian Voivodeship (north-central Poland)
- Mokre, Mogilno County in Kuyavian-Pomeranian Voivodeship (north-central Poland)
- Mokre, Łódź Voivodeship (central Poland)
- Mokre, Gmina Rossosz, Biała County in Lublin Voivodeship (east Poland)
- Mokre, Zamość County in Lublin Voivodeship (east Poland)
- Mokre, Masovian Voivodeship (east-central Poland)
- Mokre, Opole Voivodeship (south-west Poland)
- Mokre-Kolonia in Opole Voivodeship (south-west Poland)
- Mokre, Dębica County in Podkarpackie Voivodeship (south-east Poland)
- Mokre, Sanok County in Podkarpackie Voivodeship (south-east Poland)
- Mokre, Podlaskie Voivodeship (north-east Poland)
- Mokre, Chojnice County in Pomeranian Voivodeship (north Poland)
- Mokre, Słupsk County in Pomeranian Voivodeship (north Poland)
- Mokre, Mikołów in Silesian Voivodeship (south Poland)
- Mokre, Świętokrzyskie Voivodeship (south-central Poland)
- Mokre, Goleniów County in West Pomeranian Voivodeship (north-west Poland)
- Mokre, Koszalin County in West Pomeranian Voivodeship (north-west Poland)
