= Tarnkowa =

- Location within Poland
- Coordinates: 50°14′53″N 17°45′12″E
- Country: Poland
- Voivodeship: Opole
- County: Głubczyce
- Gmina: Głubczyce
- Time zone: UTC+1 (CET)
  - Summer (DST): UTC+2 (CEST)
- Area code: +48 77
- Car plates: OGL

Tarnkowa [tarŋˈkɔva] is a small village located in Poland, in the Opole Voivodeship, Głubczyce County, Gmina Głubczyce, near the border with the Czech Republic.
