= Bernacice =

- Location within Poland
- Coordinates: 50°10′N 17°52′E
- Country: Poland
- Voivodeship: Opole
- County: Głubczyce
- Gmina: Głubczyce
- Time zone: UTC+1 (CET)
  - Summer (DST): UTC+2 (CEST)
- Area code: +48 77
- Car plates: OGL

Bernacice [bɛrnaˈt͡ɕit͡sɛ] is a village located in Poland, in the Opole Voivodeship, Głubczyce County and Gmina Głubczyce. It is situated about 6 km (3.73 mi) south-east of the centre of Głubczyce and 9 km (5.59 mi) west of the centre of Baborów.

== See also ==
- Bernacice Górne
