= Braciszów =

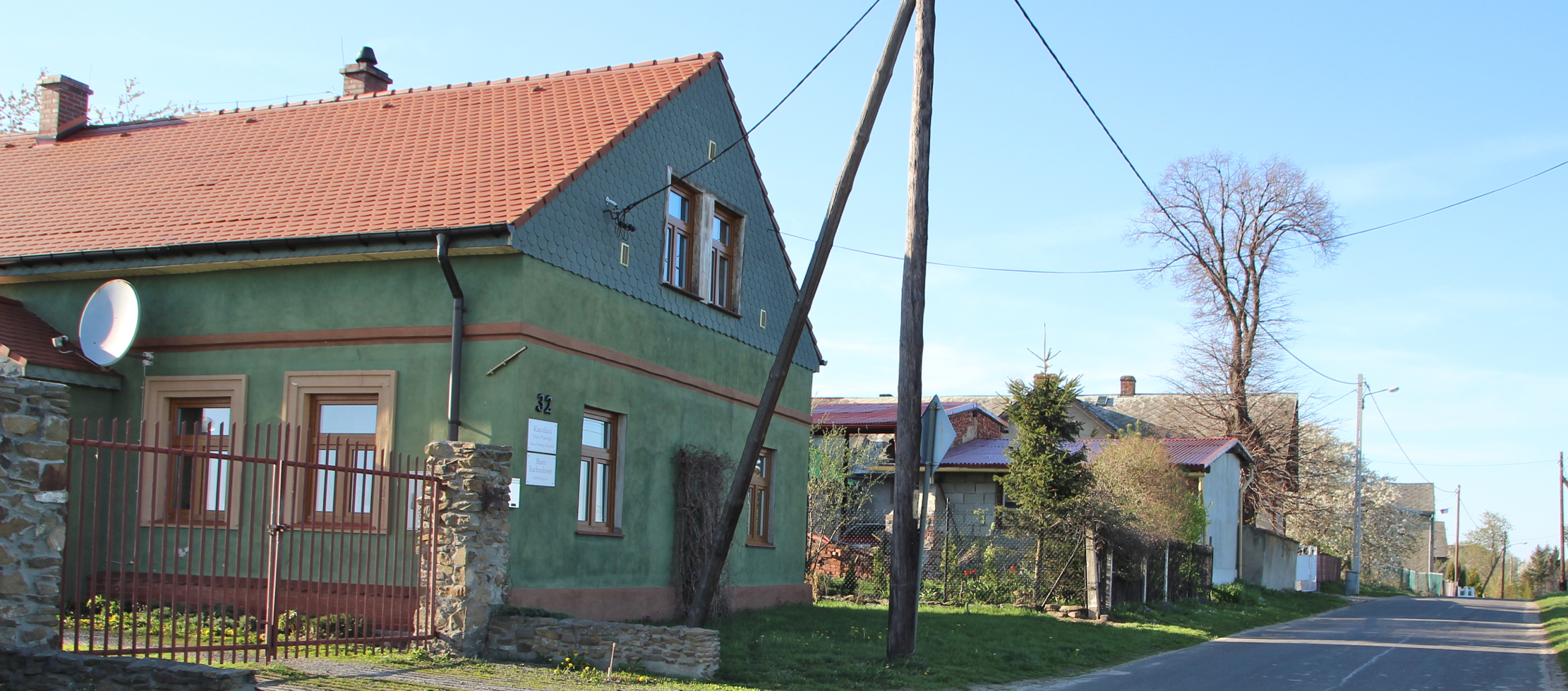

- Location within Poland
- Coordinates: 50°8′N 17°43′E
- Country: Poland
- Voivodeship: Opole
- County: Głubczyce
- Gmina: Głubczyce
- Time zone: UTC+1 (CET)
  - Summer (DST): UTC+2 (CEST)
- Area code: +48 77
- Car plates: OGL

Braciszów [braˈt͡ɕiʂuf] is a village located in Poland, in the Opole Voivodeship, Głubczyce County and Gmina Głubczyce. The region is called Województwo opolskie.

== Location ==
The village is about 12 km (7.46 mi) south-west of the centre of Głubczyce.

== Climate ==
Braciszów temperatures normally range from 25 to −6 °C throughout the year, having relatively warm summers and mildly cold winters.
