= Żabczyce =

- Village
- Location within Poland
- Coordinates: 50°15′12″N 17°46′32″E
- Country: Poland
- Voivodeship: Opole
- County: Głubczyce
- Gmina: Głubczyce

Żabczyce [ʐapˈt͡ʂɨt͡sɛ] is a village in the administrative district of Gmina Głubczyce, within Głubczyce County, Opole Voivodeship, in south-western Poland.
