= Kwiatoniów =

- Location within Poland
- Coordinates: 50°13′36″N 17°45′54″E
- Country: Poland
- Voivodeship: Opole
- County: Głubczyce
- Gmina: Głubczyce

Population
  - Total: 111
- Time zone: UTC+1 (CET)
  - Summer (DST): UTC+2 (CEST)
- Postal code: 48-151
- Area code: +48 77
- Car plates: OGL

Kwiatoniów [kfjaˈtɔɲuf] is a village located in the Opole Voivodeship (south-western Poland), near the border with the Czech Republic. It is in Głubczyce County and Gmina Głubczyce.
