= Studzienica, Opole Voivodeship =

Coordinates: 50°14′02″N 17°50′21″E

Studzienica
- Village
- Location within Poland
- Country: Poland
- Voivodeship: Opole
- County: Głubczyce
- Gmina: Głubczyce

Studzienica [stud͡ʑɛˈnit͡sa] is a village in the administrative district of Gmina Głubczyce, within Głubczyce County, Opole Voivodeship, in south-western Poland.
