= Głubczyce-Las =

Coordinates: 50°13′34″N 17°47′16″E

- Village
- Interactive map of Głubczyce-Las
- Country: Poland
- Voivodeship: Opole
- County: Głubczyce
- Gmina: Głubczyce

Głubczyce-Las [ɡwupˈt͡ʂɨt͡sɛ ˈlas] is a village in the administrative district of Gmina Głubczyce, within Głubczyce County, Opole Voivodeship, in south-western Poland.

The village has a few lone houses and a railway station (built in 1976)
