= Mokre, Opole Voivodeship =

Mokre
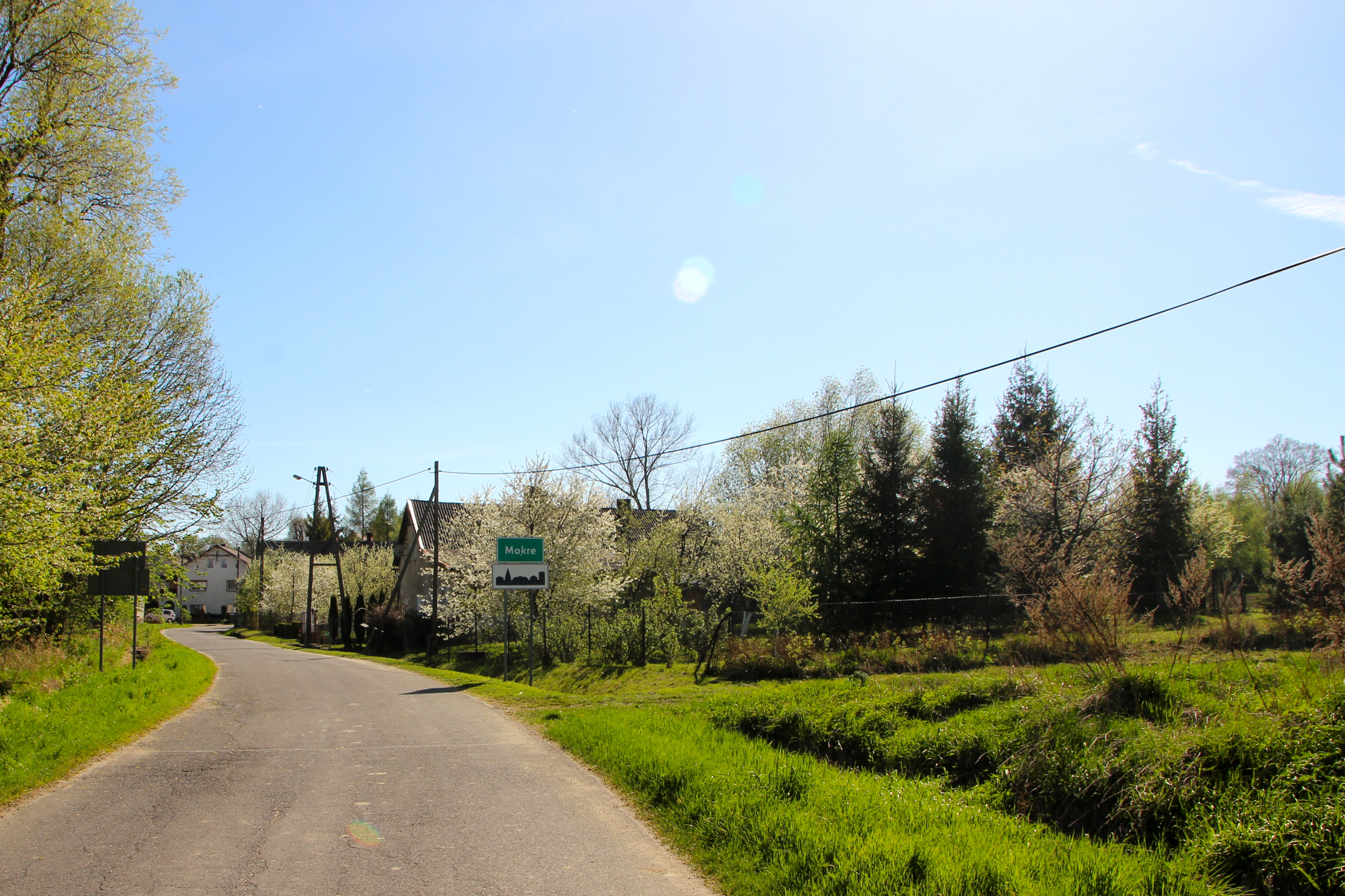
- Entrance to the village

- Location within Poland
- Coordinates: 50°9′18″N 17°41′54″E
- Country: Poland
- Voivodeship: Opole
- County: Głubczyce
- Gmina: Głubczyce
- Time zone: UTC+1 (CET)
  - Summer (DST): UTC+2 (CEST)
- Postal code: 48-155
- Area code: +48 77
- Car plates: OGL

Mokre ['mɔkrɛ] (meaning "wet") is a village located in south-western Poland, in the Opole Voivodeship, Głubczyce County and Gmina Głubczyce.

== History ==
During World War II, the German administration operated the E316 forced labour subcamp of the Stalag VIII-B/344 prisoner-of-war camp in the village.

== Transport ==
The Polish National road 38 runs nearby, south of the village.
