= Klisinko =

Coordinates: 50°18′45″N 17°48′52″E

- Village
- Location within Poland
- Country: Poland
- Voivodeship: Opole
- County: Głubczyce
- Gmina: Głubczyce

Klisinko [kliˈɕinkɔ] is a village in the administrative district of Gmina Głubczyce, within Głubczyce County, Opole Voivodeship, in south-western Poland.
