= Dobrogostów =

Coordinates: 50°15′12″N 17°44′36″E

- Village
- Interactive map of Dobrogostów
- Country: Poland
- Voivodeship: Opole
- County: Głubczyce
- Gmina: Głubczyce

Dobrogostów [dɔbrɔˈɡɔstuf] is a village in the administrative district of Gmina Głubczyce, within Głubczyce County, Opole Voivodeship, in south-western Poland.
