= Marysieńka =

Marysieńka may refer to:

- Marysieńka (queen), short name of Marie Casimire Louise de La Grange d'Arquien, queen of Poland
- Marysieńka, Opole Voivodeship, a Polish village
