= Rusín =

- Municipality
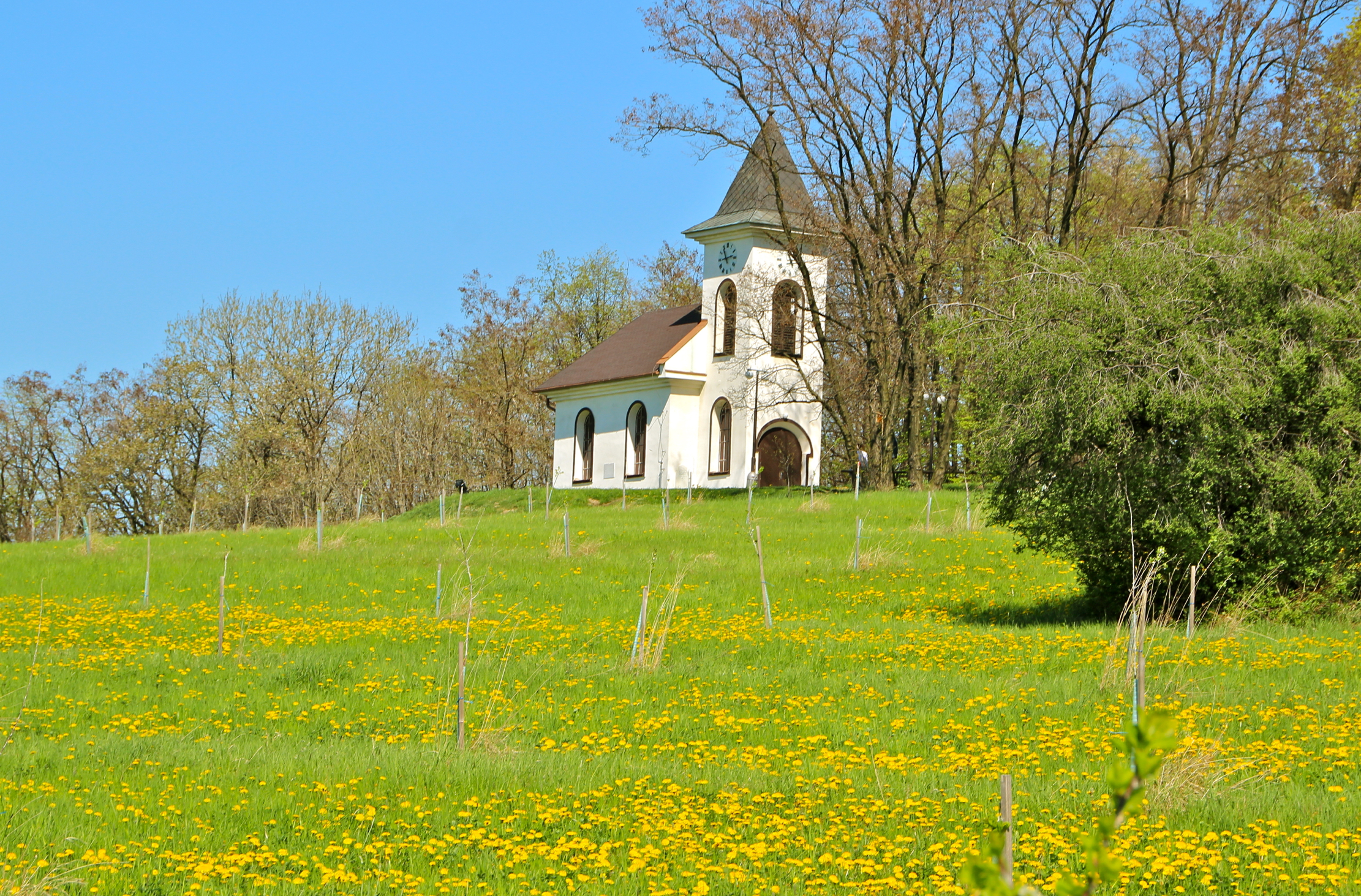
- Chapel of the Virgin Mary

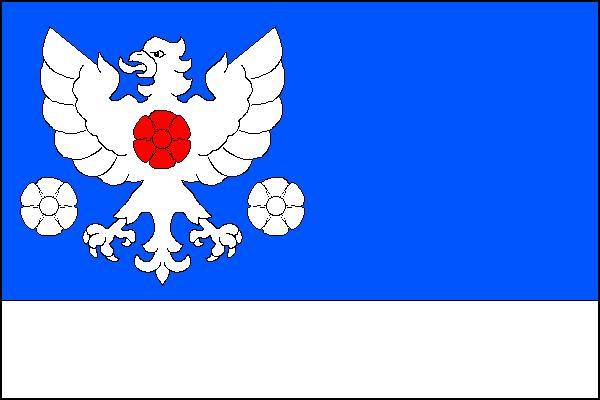
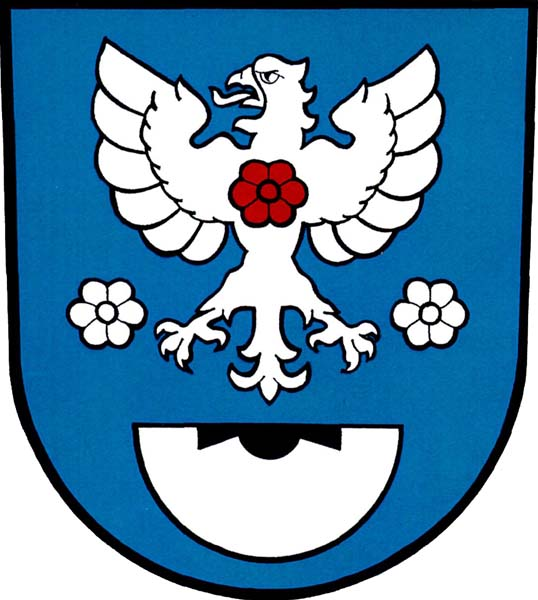
- Flag Coat of arms

- Location in the Czech Republic
- Coordinates: 50°12′35″N 17°44′3″E
- Country: Czech Republic
- Region: Moravian-Silesian
- District: Bruntál
- First mentioned: 1262

Area
  - Total: 14.29 km^{2} (5.52 sq mi)
- Elevation: 256 m (840 ft)

Population (2026-01-01)
  - Total: 135
  - Density: 9.45/km^{2} (24.5/sq mi)
- Time zone: UTC+1 (CET)
  - Summer (DST): UTC+2 (CEST)
- Postal code: 793 97
- Website: www.obecrusin.cz

Rusín (German: Rausen) is a municipality and village in Bruntál District in the Moravian-Silesian Region of the Czech Republic. It has about 100 inhabitants.

== Administrative division ==
Rusín consists of three municipal parts (in brackets population according to the 2021 census):

- Rusín (102)
- Hrozová (26)
- Matějovice (19)

== Geography ==
Rusín is located about 31 kilometres (19 mi) northeast of Bruntál and 55 km (34 mi) northwest of Ostrava. The municipality is situated in the Osoblažsko microregion on the border with Poland. It lies in the Zlatohorská Highlands. The highest point is the hill Rusínký kopec at 314 m (1,030 ft) above sea level.

The Hrozová Stream (a tributary of the Osoblaha) forms the Czech–Polish border, then flows across the territory, and then forms a part of the northwestern municipal border.

== History ==
The first written mention of Rusín is in the will of Vok of Rosenberg from 1262. In 1331, Rusín was bought by Heinek of Głubczyce and annexed to the Głubczyce estate. He owned the village for about 20 years. After his death, Rusín was inherited by the Lords of Fullstein, who annexed it to the Fullstein estate and owned it in the following centuries.

== Demographics ==
Historical population

Year	Pop.	±%
1869	1,246	—
1880	1,217	−2.3%
1890	1,142	−6.2%
1900	1,072	−6.1%
1910	943	−12.0%

Year	Pop.	±%
1921	924	−2.0%
1930	886	−4.1%
1950	467	−47.3%
1961	385	−17.6%
1970	318	−17.4%

Year	Pop.	±%
1980	242	−23.9%
1991	174	−28.1%
2001	147	−15.5%
2011	132	−10.2%
2021	147	+11.4%

Source: Censuses

== Transport ==
There are no railways or major roads passing through the municipality.

== Sights ==
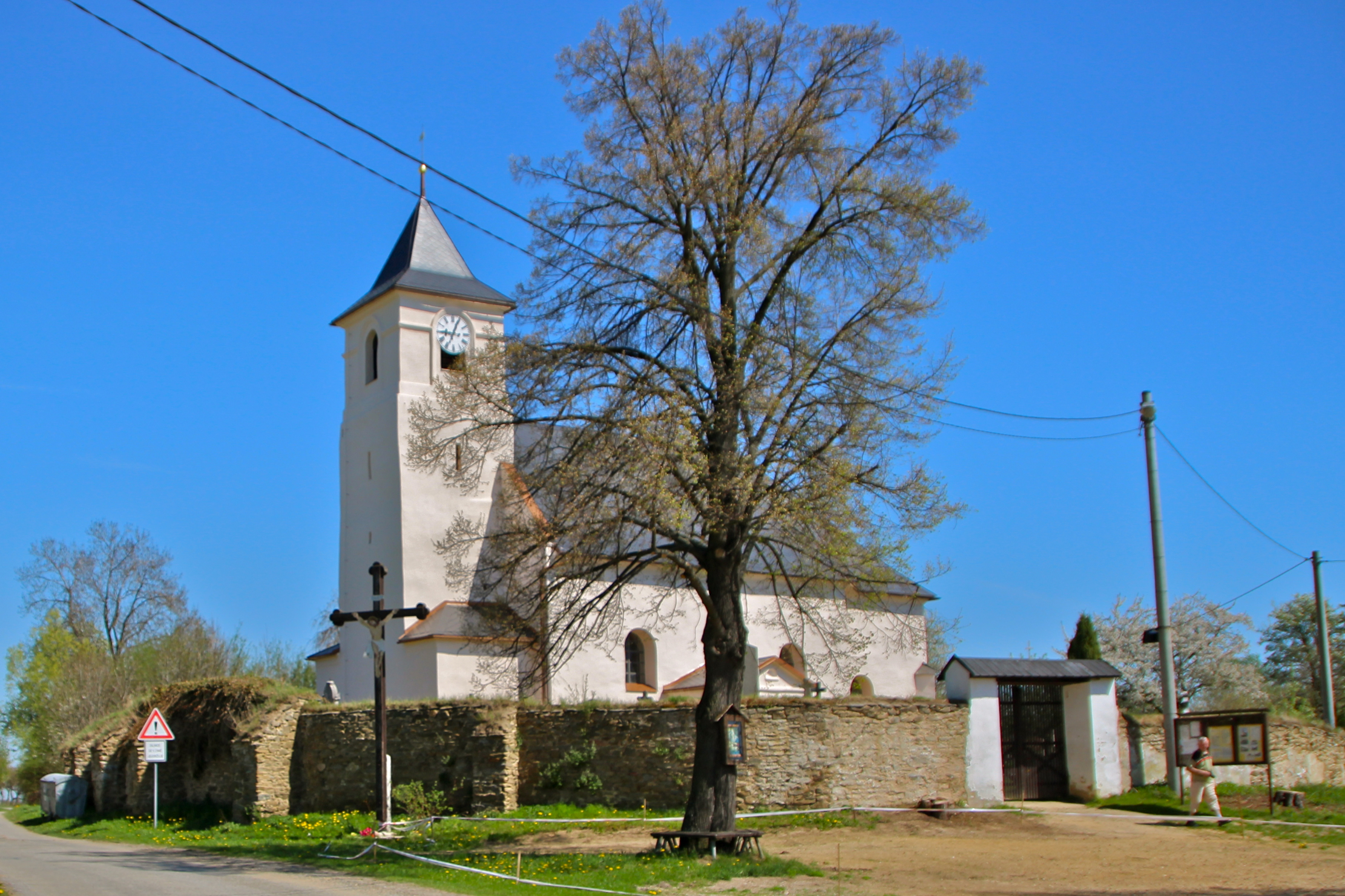
Church of Saint Michael the Archangel in Hrozová

The main landmark of the Hrozová village is the Church of Saint Michael the Archangel. The church was first mentioned in 1309 and is as old as the village. The church was modified several times, but the core is an early Gothic building from the 13th century. The Baroque windows are from 1758. In 2013, extraordinarily large frescoes were unveiled in the church. It is a painting from the last third of the 13th century, and is one of the most important late Romanesque frescoes in the country.

The Chapel of the Virgin Mary on the Rusínský kopec was built in 1816 and has become a pilgrimage site. After it was destroyed in 1945, a replica was built on its original site in the 1990s, which again became a pilgrimage site.

The Matějovice Cave is a pseudokarst cave located in the sandstone rock close to Matějovice. The passage is 16 metres (52 ft) long and 3–4 metres high.

== Twin towns – sister cities ==
Rusín is twinned with:

- Głubczyce, Poland
