= Marysieńka, Opole Voivodeship =

Marysieńka
- Village
- Country: Poland
- Voivodeship: Opole
- County: Głubczyce
- Gmina: Głubczyce

Marysieńka [marɨˈɕɛɲka] is a village in the administrative district of Gmina Głubczyce, within Głubczyce County, Opole Voivodeship, in south-western Poland.
