= Bohušov =

- Municipality
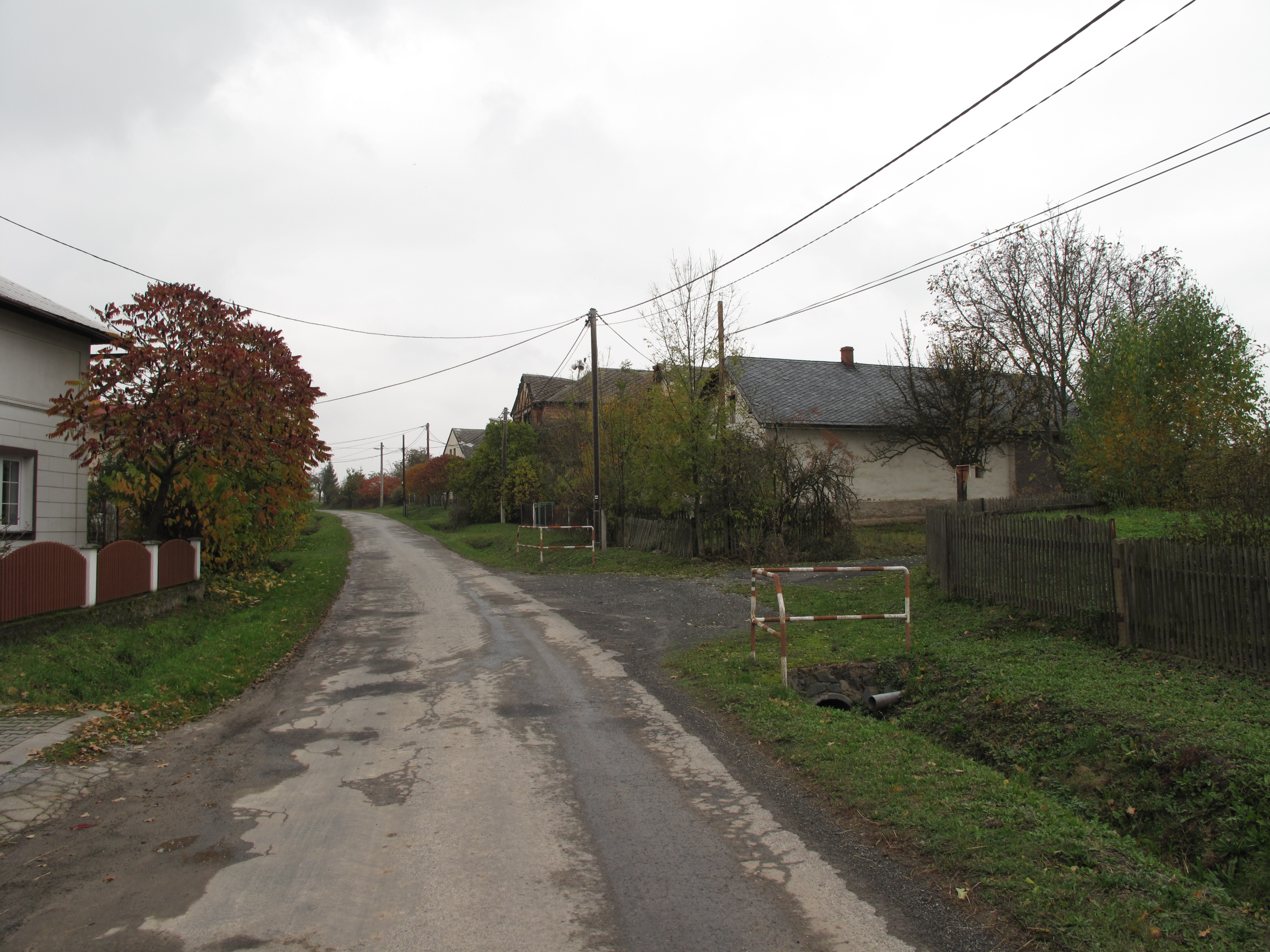
- Karlov, a part of Bohušov

- Flag Coat of arms

- Location in the Czech Republic
- Coordinates: 50°14′36″N 17°42′50″E
- Country: Czech Republic
- Region: Moravian-Silesian
- District: Bruntál
- First mentioned: 1255

Area
  - Total: 20.70 km^{2} (7.99 sq mi)
- Elevation: 240 m (790 ft)

Population (2026-01-01)
  - Total: 376
  - Density: 18.2/km^{2} (47.0/sq mi)
- Time zone: UTC+1 (CET)
  - Summer (DST): UTC+2 (CEST)
- Postal code: 793 98
- Website: www.bohusov.cz

Bohušov (until 1950 Fulštejn; German: Füllstein) is a municipality and village in Bruntál District in the Moravian-Silesian Region of the Czech Republic. It has about 400 inhabitants.

== Administrative division ==
Bohušov consists of four municipal parts (in brackets population according to the 2021 census):

- Bohušov (236)
- Dolní Povelice (85)
- Karlov (33)
- Ostrá Hora (9)

== Geography ==
Bohušov is located about 32 kilometres (20 mi) northeast of Bruntál and 58 km (36 mi) northwest of Ostrava. The municipality lies on the border with Poland in the Osoblažsko microregion. It lies in the Zlatohorská Highlands. The highest point is the hill V Pekle at 318 m (1,043 ft) above sea level. The Osoblaha River flows across the municipality. There are several fishponds, the largest of which are Bohušovský rybník and Pod hradem.

== History ==
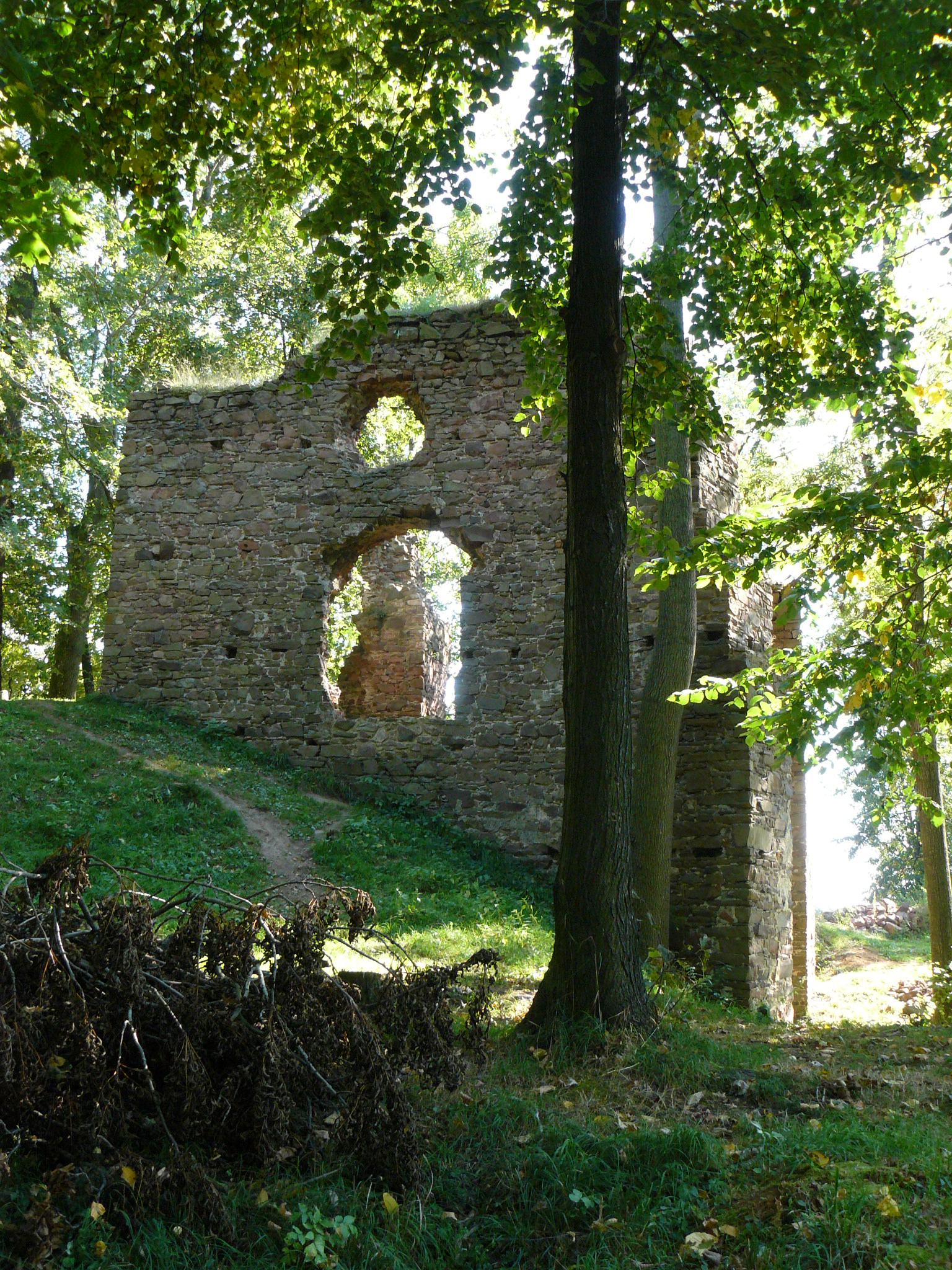
Fulštejn castle ruin

The first written mention of Bohušov is from 1255. It was one of the settlements that were founded in the area shortly before at the initiative of the bishop Bruno von Schauenburg. The area was then settled by German colonisers. Knight Herbort of Fulme had built here a castle called Fullstein (Fulštejn), and Bohušov, that time called Gottfriedsdorf, was a group of hamlets that was formed in the castle grounds.

During the Hussite Wars, the area was devastated. In 1570, the Fullstein estate was acquired by the Sedlnický family and the village of Gottfriedsdorf was renamed Fullstein. In 1649, the castle was conquered and severely damaged by the Swedish troops.

In 1938, Bohušov was annexed by Nazi Germany and administered as a part of the Reichsgau Sudetenland. After World War II, the German-speaking population was expelled and the village was resettled by Czechs.

== Demographics ==
Historical population

| Year | Pop. | ±% |
|---|---|---|
| 1869 | 2,020 | — |
| 1880 | 2,006 | −0.7% |
| 1890 | 1,963 | −2.1% |
| 1900 | 1,825 | −7.0% |
| 1910 | 1,664 | −8.8% |

| Year | Pop. | ±% |
|---|---|---|
| 1921 | 1,624 | −2.4% |
| 1930 | 1,508 | −7.1% |
| 1950 | 703 | −53.4% |
| 1961 | 673 | −4.3% |
| 1970 | 633 | −5.9% |

| Year | Pop. | ±% |
|---|---|---|
| 1980 | 579 | −8.5% |
| 1991 | 461 | −20.4% |
| 2001 | 456 | −1.1% |
| 2011 | 381 | −16.4% |
| 2021 | 363 | −4.7% |

Source: Censuses

== Economy ==
Bohušov is a tourist destination. At the fishpond Pod hradem is a recreational area with a camp.

== Transport ==
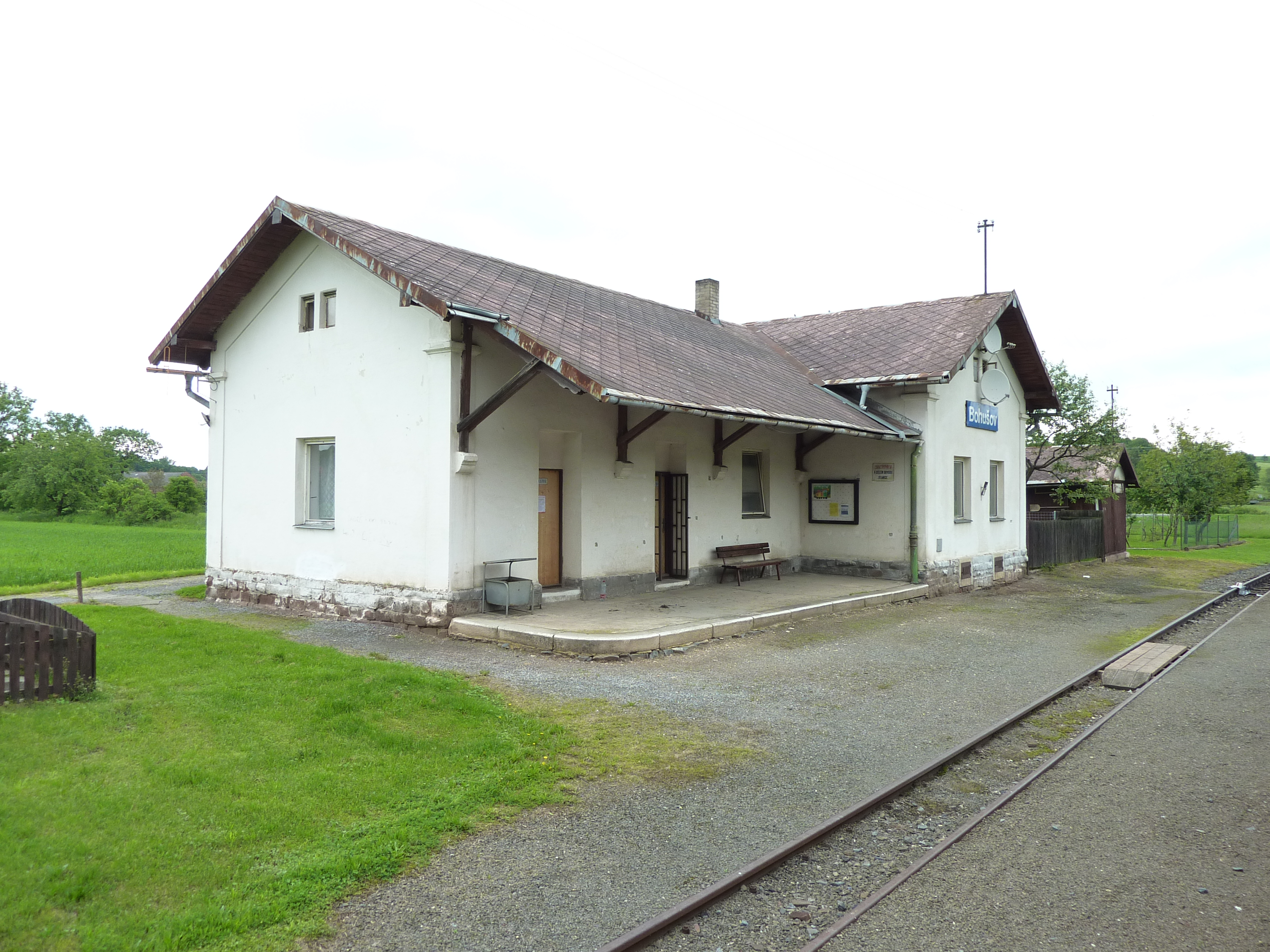
Train station

Bohušov is located on the narrow-gauge Třemešná ve Slezsku–Osoblaha railway. There are two stops in the municipality: Bohušov and Koberno.

== Sights ==
The main landmark of Bohušov is the Fulštejn castle ruin. It is located on a wooded hill above the Osoblaha River. The ruin is freely accessible.

The Church of Saint Martin was built shortly after 1255. The originally Gothic building was later modified in the Baroque style. After the fire in 1800, it was reconstructed into its current form.

The narrow-gauge railway serves not only for transport but also as a tourist attraction. Steam trains run on weekends during the tourist season.
