= Gmina Głubczyce =

Gmina Głubczyce Głubczyce Commune
- Gmina
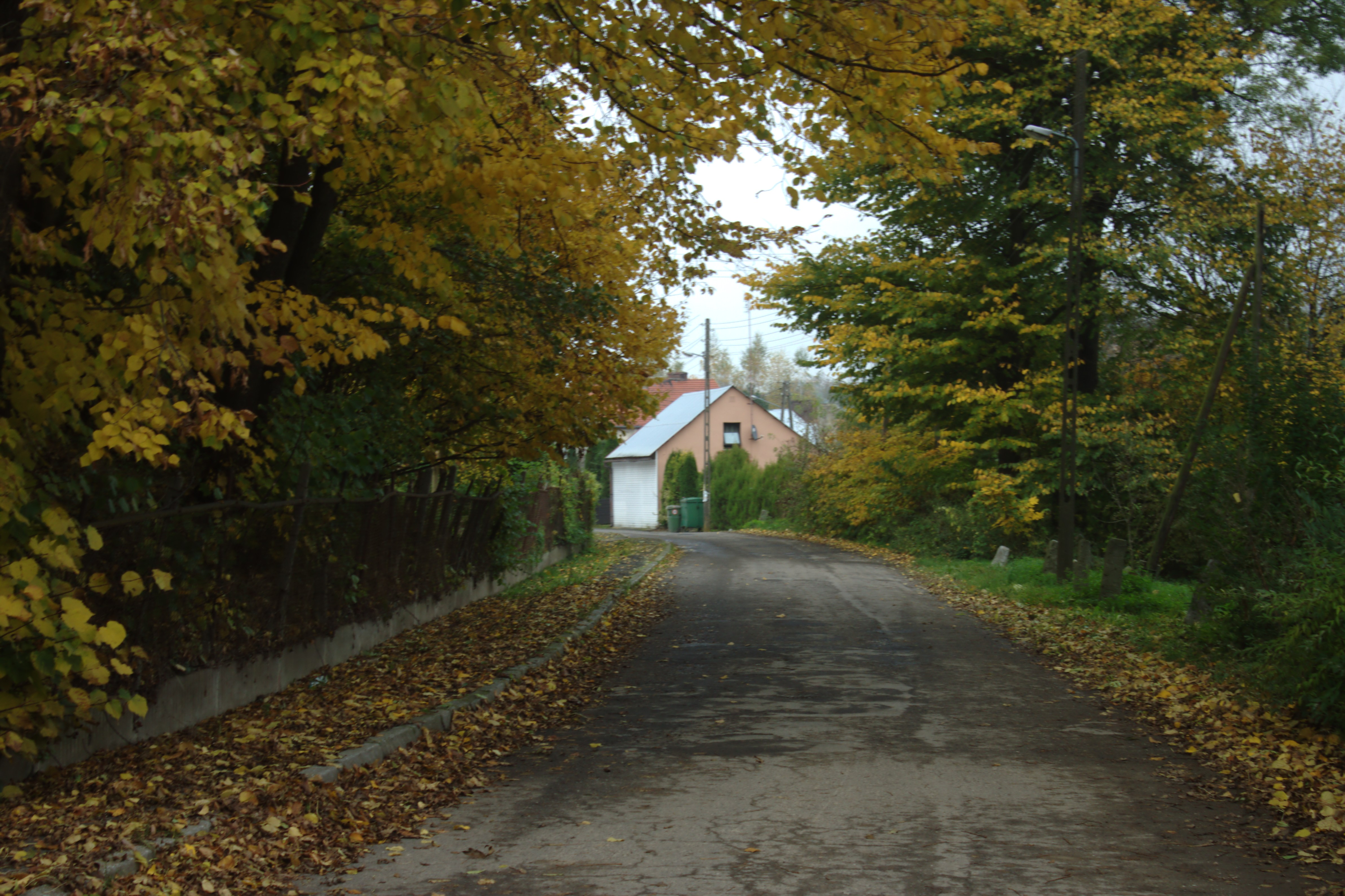
- Road in Zawiszyce

- Coat of arms
- Interactive map of Gmina Głubczyce
- Coordinates (Głubczyce): 50°12′0″N 17°50′3″E
- Country: Poland
- Voivodeship: Opole
- County: Głubczyce
- Seat: Głubczyce

Area
  - Total: 294.33 km^{2} (113.64 sq mi)

Population (2019-06-30)
  - Total: 22,316
  - Density: 75.820/km^{2} (196.37/sq mi)
  - Urban: 12,552
  - Rural: 9,764
- Time zone: UTC+1 (CET)
  - Summer (DST): UTC+2 (CEST)
- Vehicle registration: OGL
- Website: http://www.glubczyce.pl

Gmina Głubczyce is an urban-rural gmina (administrative district) in Głubczyce County, Opole Voivodeship, in southern Poland. Its seat is the town of Głubczyce, which lies approximately 53 kilometres (33 mi) south of the regional capital Opole.

The gmina covers an area of 294.33 square kilometres (113.6 sq mi), and as of 2007, its total population was 22,316.

== Geography ==
Gmina Głubczyce is located in the Głubczyce Hook (Polish: worek głubczycki) partly on the Głubczyce Plateau (Polish: Płaskowyż Głubczycki; a part of the Silesian Lowlands) and partly in the Opawskie Mountains (a part of the Eastern Sudeten). Gmina Głubczyce is located in the Oder River Basin (rivers: Cyna/Psina, Opawa, Opawica, Stradunia, Troja).

== Neighbouring gminas ==
Gmina Głubczyce is bordered by the gminas of Baborów, Branice, Głogówek, Kietrz and Pawłowiczki and by the Czech obeces of Krnov, Město Albrechtice, Slezské Rudoltice, Rusín, Bohušov and Osoblaha.

== Twin towns – sister cities ==
Gmina Głubczyce is twinned with:

- Krnov, Czech Republic (2001)
- Město Albrechtice, Czech Republic (2001)
- Rockenhausen, Germany (2003)
- Rusín, Czech Republic (2000)
- Saint-Rémy-sur-Avre, France (2002)
- Zbarazh, Ukraine (2005)

== Gallery ==
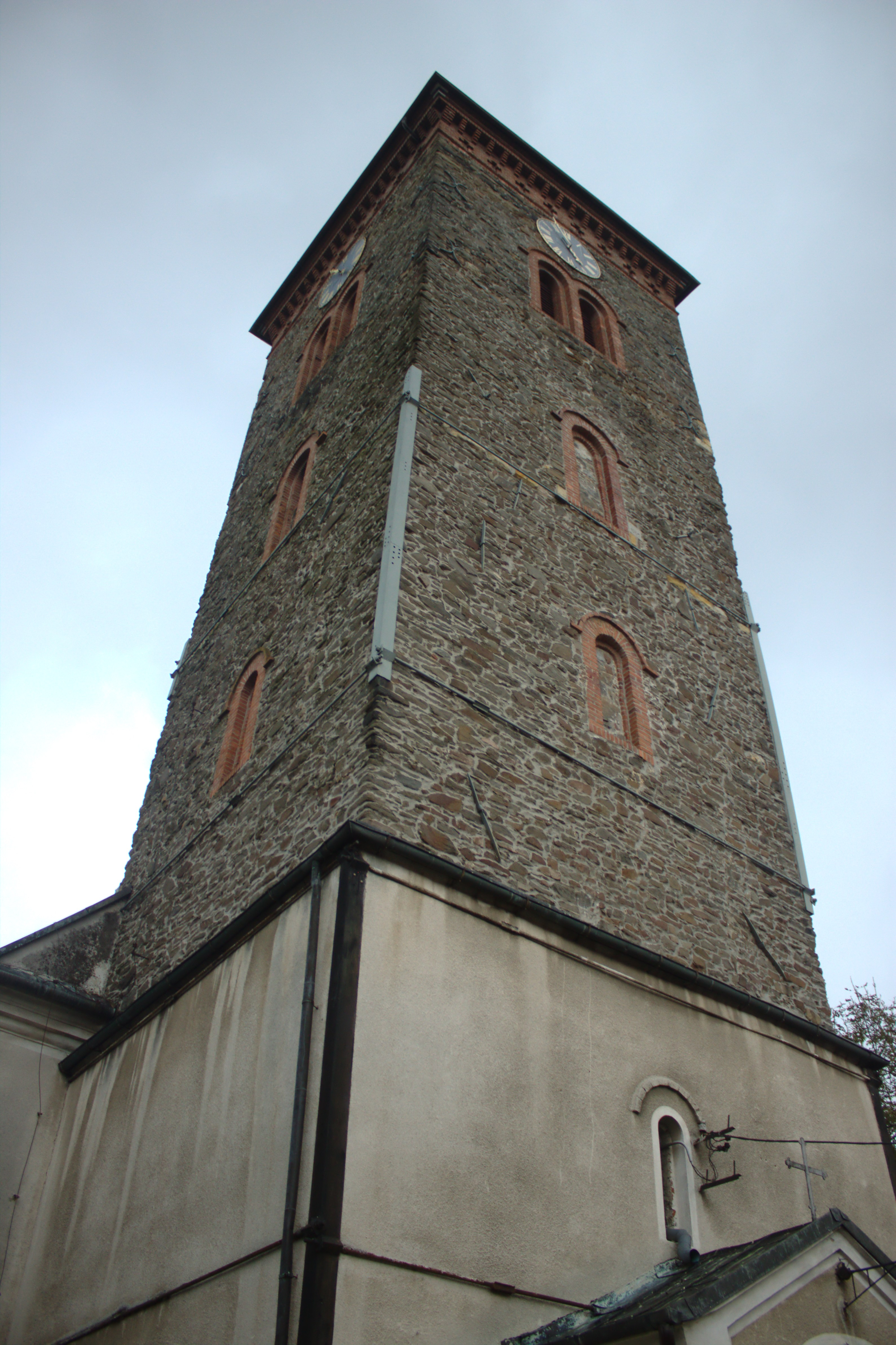
Church tower in Lisięcice

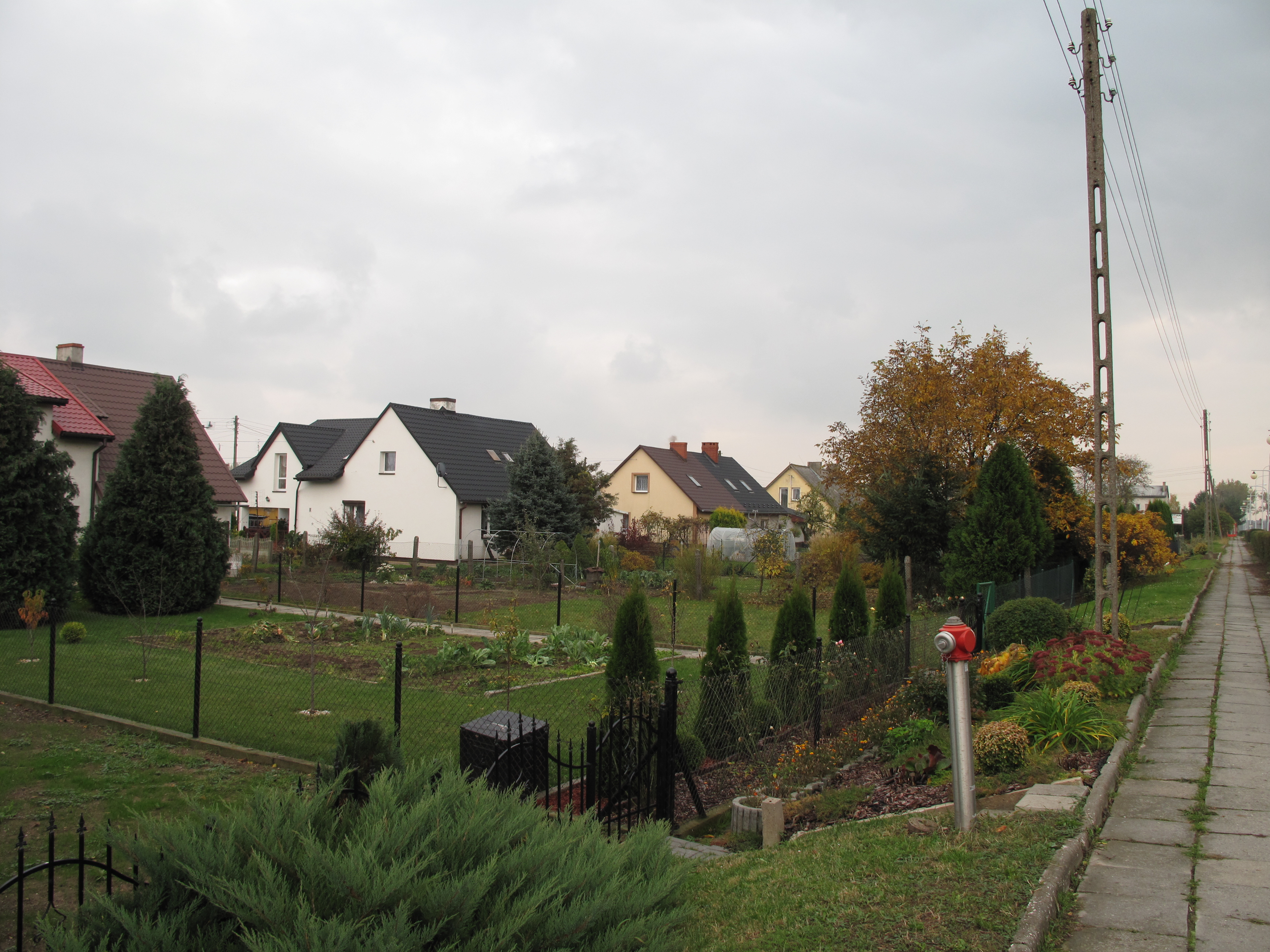
Gardens in Głubczyce-Sady

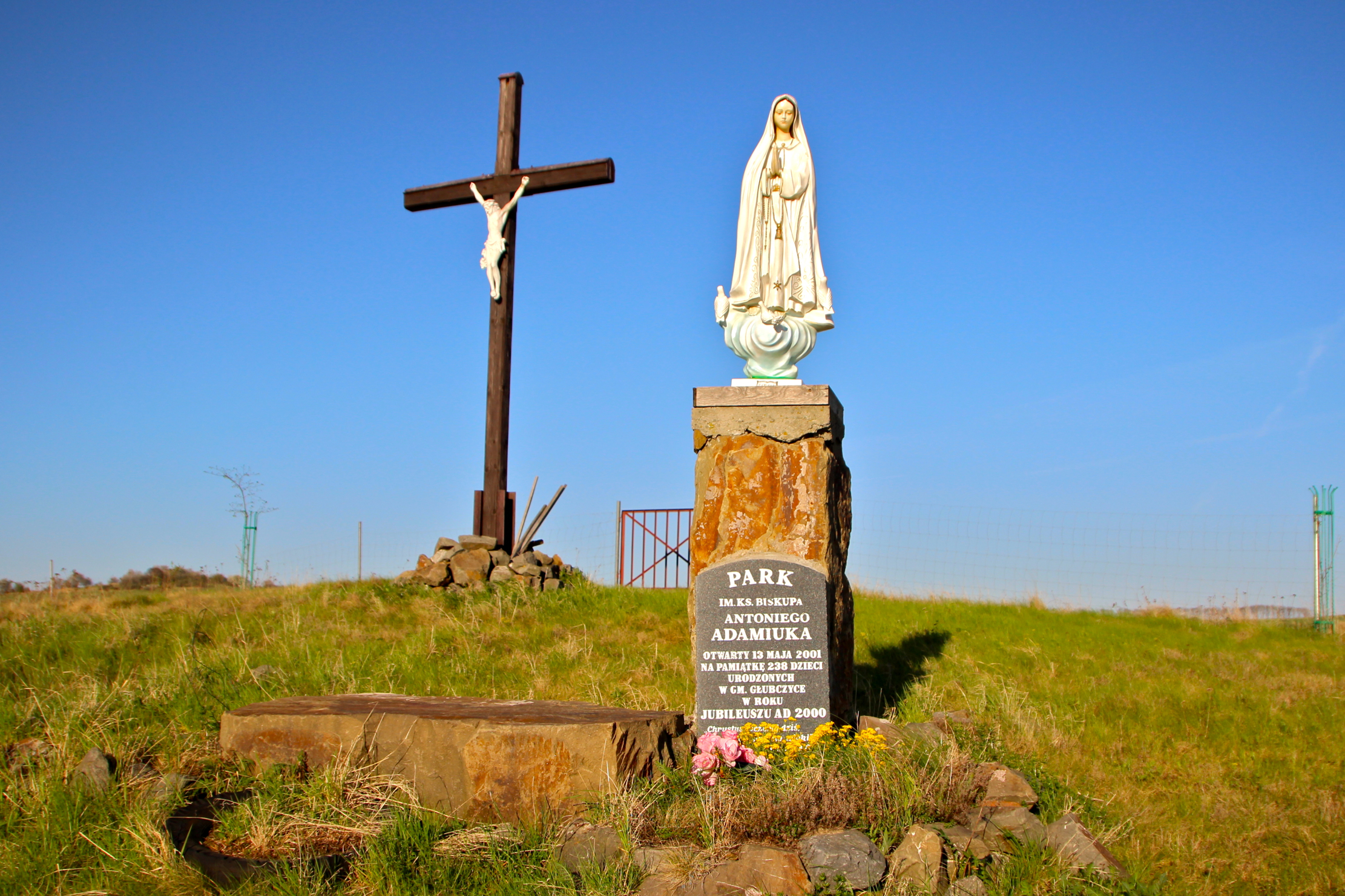
Wayside shrines

== See also ==
- Dobrogostów
- Głubczyce-Las
- Klisinko
- Marysieńka, Opole Voivodeship
