= Głubczyce County =

Głubczyce County Powiat głubczycki
- County
- Coat of arms

- Location within the voivodeship
- Coordinates (Głubczyce): 50°12′0″N 17°50′3″E
- Country: Poland
- Voivodeship: Opole
- Seat: Głubczyce
- Gminas: Total 4: Gmina Baborów; Gmina Branice; Gmina Głubczyce; Gmina Kietrz

Area
  - Total: 673.1 km^{2} (259.9 sq mi)

Population
  - Total: 45,679
  - Density: 67.86/km^{2} (175.8/sq mi)
  - Urban: 21,462
  - Rural: 24,217
- Car plates: OGL
- Website: www.powiatglubczycki.pl

Głubczyce County (Polish: powiat głubczycki) is a unit of territorial administration and local government (powiat) in Opole Voivodeship, south-western Poland, on the Czech border. It came into being on January 1, 1999, as a result of the Polish local government reforms passed in 1998. Its administrative seat and largest town is Głubczyce, which lies 53 kilometres (33 mi) south of the regional capital Opole. The county also contains the towns of Kietrz, lying 19 km (12 mi) south-east of Głubczyce, and Baborów, 12 km (7 mi) south-east of Głubczyce.

The county covers an area of 673.1 square kilometres (259.9 sq mi). As of 2019, its total population is 45,679, out of which the population of Głubczyce is 12,552, that of Kietrz is 6,005, that of Baborów is 2,905, and the rural population is 24,217.

== Neighbouring counties ==
Głubczyce County is bordered by Prudnik County to the north, and Kędzierzyn-Koźle County and Racibórz County to the east. It also borders the Czech Republic to the south and west.

== Administrative division ==
The county is subdivided into four gminas (all urban-rural). These are listed in the following table, in descending order of population.

Gmina	Type	Area (km^{2})	Population (2019)	Seat
Gmina Głubczyce	urban-rural	294.3	22,316	Głubczyce
Gmina Kietrz	urban-rural	139.9	10,899	Kietrz
Gmina Branice	urban-rural	121.9	6,489	Branice
Gmina Baborów	urban-rural	117.0	5,975	Baborów

== Local Action Group ==
On the territory of the Głubczyce County is active Plateau of the Good Land Local Action Group (Polish: LGD Płaskowyż Dobrej Ziemi).

== Partner regions ==
Głubczyce County cooperates with:

- Budišov nad Budišovkou, Czech Republic
- Holzminden (district), Germany
- Úvalno, Czech Republic

== See also ==
- Silesia Euroregion

== Gallery ==
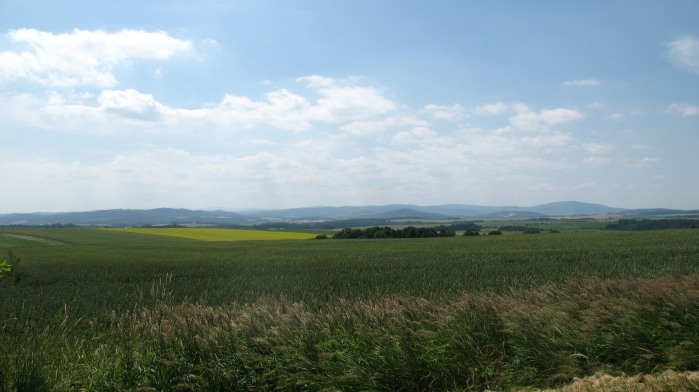
Landscape viewed about 10 km (6.2 mi) west of Głubczyce
