= Attacks in Russia during the Russo-Ukrainian war (2022–present) =

- Part of the Russo-Ukrainian war
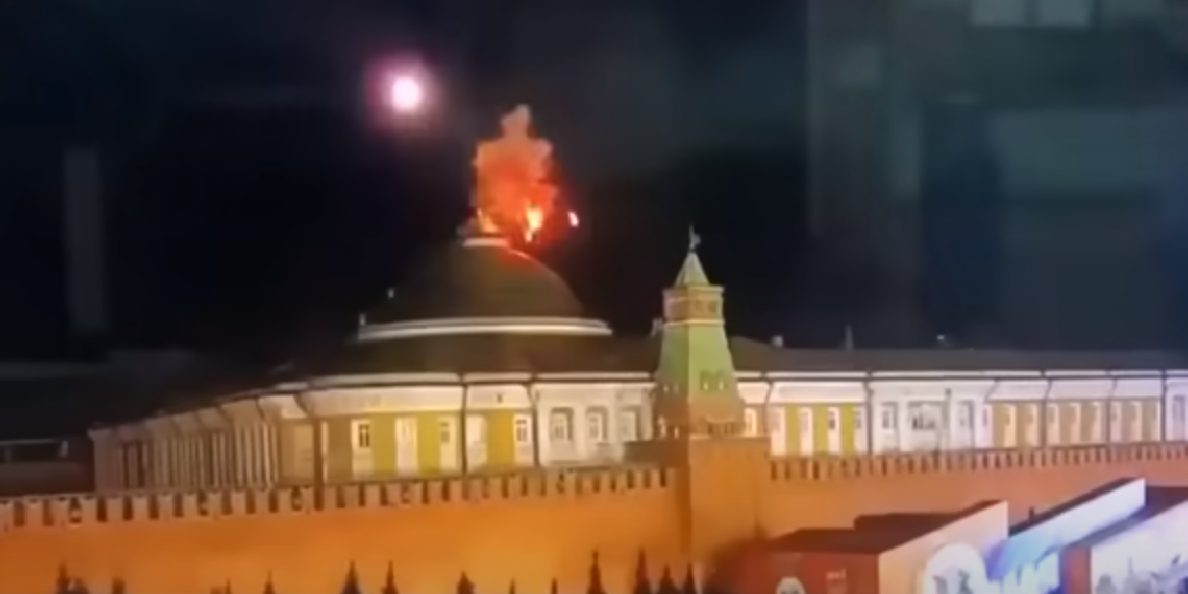
- The May 2023 Kremlin drone attack
- Location: Russia
- Date: 25 February 2022 – present (4 years, 8 months and 27 days)
- Executed by: Ministry of Defence; Armed Forces of Ukraine; Unmanned Systems Forces; Ukrainian Navy; Main Directorate of Intelligence (HUR); International Legion; Freedom of Russia Legion; Russian Volunteer Corps; Security Service of Ukraine (SBU); Combat Organization of Anarcho-Communists
- Casualties: 621+ civilians killed unknown military deaths

There have been attacks in mainland Russia as a result of the Russo-Ukrainian war since its invasion of Ukraine on 24 February 2022. The main targets have been the military, the arms industry and the oil industry. Many of the attacks have been drone strikes, firebombing, and rail sabotage. The Ukrainian intelligence services have acknowledged carrying out some of these attacks. Others have been carried out by anti-war activists in Russia. There have also been cross-border shelling, missile strikes, and covert raids from Ukraine, mainly in Belgorod, Kursk, and Bryansk oblasts. Several times, Ukrainian-based paramilitaries launched incursions into Russia, captured border villages and battled the Russian military. These were carried out by units made up mainly of Russian emigrants. While Ukraine supported these ground incursions, it denied direct involvement.

In August 2024, the Ukrainian military launched an offensive into Kursk Oblast and captured numerous settlements. It was the biggest attack into Russia since the war began and the first carried out primarily by Ukrainian regular forces.

In response to the war, there have also been attacks on Russian forces in Crimea, which Russia annexed in 2014.

== Shelling, missile and drone strikes ==
=== February–March 2022 ===
On 25 February 2022, the Millerovo air base was attacked, allegedly with Tochka-U missiles. One Su-30SM fighter was destroyed on the ground.

On 1 March, there was an explosion on a military air base in Taganrog in Rostov Oblast. There were claims that it was due to Ukrainian action.

On 23 and 24 March, Governor of Belgorod Oblast Vyacheslav Gladkov reported that Zhuravlyovka and Nekhoteyevka came under shelling from the Ukrainian side. The next day, the Moscow Patriarchate claimed that chaplain Oleg Artyomov died in Zhuravlyovka as a result of a BM-30 Smerch strike by Ukraine.

On 29 March, local officials reported a series of explosions outside the city of Belgorod, close to the border with Ukraine. It was later reported that those explosions may have been caused by a fire.

=== April 2022 ===
On 1 April 2022, according to regional governor Vyacheslav Gladkov and an unnamed US official, two Ukrainian Mi-24 helicopters attacked and set fire to a fuel depot in Belgorod in a low-altitude airstrike with no reported casualties. Ukraine denied and dismissed the event as Russian propaganda. Ukrainian security official Oleksiy Danilov denied Ukraine was behind the helicopter attack, with a joke in which he blamed the "People's Republic of Belgorod" instead. On the same day, a rocket exploded in a different part of the oblast, but its apparent trajectory and model led open-source researchers to suspect it was a failed Russian missile.

On 11 April, Belgorod, Bryansk, Kursk, and Voronezh Oblasts all raised their terror alert system to "yellow", the second tier in a three-class system. The Republic of Crimea and Krasnodar Krai raised their alert levels in certain districts. Authorities in Belgorod ordered a two-week ban on fireworks and firecrackers.

On 14 April 2022, the FSB border service reported that on 13 April, a border checkpoint near Novye Yurkovichi, Bryansk Oblast came under mortar fire from Ukraine while a group of around 30 Ukrainian refugees headed for Russia was present there. According to the official claims, two automobiles were damaged but no injuries were documented.

On the same day, regional and municipal authorities stated that Ukraine had shelled the village of Spodaryushino (near Mokraya Orlovka) in Belgorod Oblast, causing several explosions. While no injuries occurred, the village's population was temporarily evacuated, out of concerns about a possible escalation. A neighboring settlement also had its population relocated. Governor of Belgorod Oblast Vyacheslav Gladkov said that the attack "had come from the Ukrainian side." In a separate alleged attack a resident of Zhuravlyovka was injured, according to Gladkov.

Also on 14 April, the Investigative Committee of Russia said Ukrainian attack helicopters had launched six missile strikes on residential areas in the town of Klimovo, Bryansk Oblast, damaging six buildings. Officials at the Russian Health Ministry said that seven people had been injured, two of which had been hurt seriously. According to personnel at the city's hospital, among those injured were a pregnant woman and a two-year-old child. According to Radio Free Europe/Radio Liberty, an unverified video of a house in Bryansk burning went viral on the internet. The next day, Russian security services claimed they had shot down a Mil Mi-8 helicopter during the incident.

On 15 April, Russia launched major missile strikes on the Ukrainian capital Kyiv in retaliation for alleged cross-border attacks. The Russian strikes were the largest of their kind to take place since Russia aborted its 2022 Kyiv offensive.

Ukraine rejected claims that it was responsible for the 14 April 2022 attacks, instead asserting that Russian intelligence services were trying to "carry out terrorist acts to whip up anti-Ukrainian hysteria" in the country. After the attack, the Security Service of Ukraine released what it claimed were intercepted conversations between Russian soldiers showing that Russia deliberately fired on the villages in order to blame Ukraine. One of the alleged soldiers refers to the 1999 Russian apartment bombings where he says that the "same shit happened in the Chechen war. Apartments were blown up in Moscow, like they were terrorists. In fact, they are FSB officers". Ukrainian interior ministry advisor Anton Gerashchenko said that something "fell and caught fire" at a Russian military facility, without explicitly confirming or denying Ukrainian responsibility.

On 19 April, Belgorod's governor accused Ukrainian forces of striking the village of Golovchino, damaging more than 30 houses and lightly wounding 3 residents. On 25 April, according to the Belgorod governor, at least two residents, a man and a woman, were injured in Zhuravlyovka as a result of shelling.

On the same day, another attack happened in Bryansk: in the morning, two large explosions and fires occurred at two oil facilities, a civilian one and a military one. Videos and images posted on social media showed large columns of black smoke several hours after the initial explosions. An analyst told The Guardian that the fires were likely an act of sabotage by Ukraine, although responsibility remained uncertain. Unconfirmed reports in the Russian media suggested the fires could have been caused by a drone attack; on the same day, two Bayraktar TB2 drones were reportedly shot down in Bryansk Oblast.

On 29–30 April, a border checkpoint near Krupets in Rylsky District of Kursk Oblast was repeatedly shelled, according to the governor. The Bryansk governor said that his region was shelled as well.

=== May 2022 ===
On 11 May, the Belgorod governor claimed that Solokhi was shelled from Ukraine. According to him, one person was killed and seven were injured as a result of the incident. Videos online also showed damage to stores and private houses, local officials reportedly began evacuating the village after the attack. The deceased was identified as Ruslan Nefyodov, aged 18.

On 15 May, Gladkov said that one person was injured with a shrapnel wound in Sereda after a Ukrainian strike, as 10 shells were reportedly shot down by Russian air defense systems. Another 10 shells fell close to Novostroyevka-Vtoraya, while another round of eight artillery shells reportedly damaged a power line and a number of farming structures in Zhuravlyovka.

On 17 May, Gladkov claimed that one more person was slightly injured in Bezymeno as it was shelled from the territory of Ukraine. Kursk governor said that the border checkpoint at Tyotkino had been shelled once again on the same day, no victims were reported. On 18 May, Gladkov declared that Solokhi was shelled again, and one person was reportedly injured. Kursk governor Starovoyt reported that Alekseevka, Glushkovsky District, was shelled. On 19 May, Starovoyt claimed that a distillery in Tyotkino was shelled, a truck driver died, and at least one civilian was wounded. On the same day, Alekseevka and Dronovka were reportedly shelled.

On 25 May, Gladkov claimed that one person was wounded in Zhuravlyovka as it was shelled "from the territory of Ukraine". Zhuravlyovka and Nekhoteyevka were subject to continuous shelling on 26 May. A woman died from her wounds in the hospital the next day. On 26 May, Starovoyt said that Vorozhba, Sudzhansky District came under shelling "from the Ukrainian side", and a local school teacher was wounded by broken glass.

=== June–July 2022 ===
On 6 June, a bridge at Tyotkino was shelled, damaging it. Near the bridge, a block of apartments was badly damaged, a car was burnt out and the local sugar refinery suffered some damage.

Klintsy and its surrounding regions in Bryansk Oblast were shelled for three days straight beginning on 12 June. The first two days of attacks were more minor incidents targeting military bases, with little to no casualties. On 14 June a helicopter fired missiles at residential areas in the city, damaging dozens of houses and ripping a woman's leg off. Authorities recorded six injuries on 14 June. As a result of the attacks, Klintsy and the surrounding region was left without water and electricity.

On 22 June, the Novoshakhtinsk oil refinery in Rostov Oblast was reportedly hit by a suicide drone, no casualties were reported.

On 3 July, officials said that a group of explosions targeting civilian areas in Belgorod had killed at least five people and injured four, several buildings and private houses were damaged or destroyed, anti-aircraft defense systems reportedly activated, but one projectile hit an apartment building. Russia blamed Ukraine for the attack and Defence Ministry spokesman Igor Konashenkov said that Russia had shot down three Ukrainian Tochka U ballistic missiles armed with cluster warheads. Ukraine denied it was responsible.

=== September–October 2022 ===
A civilian was killed and two hospitalized after shelling hit the town of Valuyki in Belgorod Oblast on 15 September, according to regional authorities. Earlier, Russian authorities had reported that a border checkpoint on Nekhoteevka was attacked and that the customs terminal had caught on fire.

On 11 October, an explosion was reported at an electric substation in Shebekino; some residents were left without energy. On 15 October, new explosions were reported in Belgorod; an oil depot reportedly caught on fire. On 16 October, explosions were reported at an airport in Belgorod; videos online show anti-aircraft systems firing and smoke rising on the airport after an apparent missile strike, with two people reportedly being wounded.

=== November 2022 ===
On 1 November, the settlement of Krasnooktyabrsky in Glushkovsky District was reportedly shelled by Ukrainian forces; no injuries were reported, a five-story building was damaged and several windows were blown. Another attack was reported in Kozynka; one person was reportedly wounded in the shelling. On 2 November 5 civilians, including 3 children, were reportedly injured after shells hit the village of Guyevo, Sudzhansky District. Several private houses and stores were damaged in the attack; the village was left without electricity as power lines were either destroyed or damaged following the explosions.

On 14 November, Russian media reported several blasts in the Belgorod region. On 15 November 2 civilians were killed and 3 injured by shelling in Shebekino, Belgorod Oblast; the shells reportedly hit apartment buildings and a nearby pharmacy. The governor of Belgorod said that an 80-year-old woman died of her wounds in the hospital and that a man was killed and another was injured by parts of a missile that was shot down by air defense. On 16 November, in the village of Stalnoy Kon, Oryol Oblast, an unmanned aerial vehicle reportedly attacked an oil depot; no casualties were reported.

=== December 2022 ===
On 5 December, two air bases reported explosions, allegedly caused by Ukrainian drone attacks. At Engels-2 air base in Saratov Oblast, 2 Tu-95s were reportedly damaged. At Dyagilevo air base in Ryazan Oblast, an oil truck exploded, killing three soldiers and injuring four. On 6 December, Governor of Kursk Oblast Roman Starovoyt announced that an oil reservoir near Kursk-Khalino air base caught on fire as a result of a drone attack; no casualties were reported and the fire was quickly put out. Following the alleged Ukrainian drone strikes, Russian forces launched a new wave of attacks against Ukrainian cities. A missile reportedly fell on Moldova as a result of the Russian attack.

On 17 December, explosions were reported in Belgorod, a local resident's car was reportedly damaged by a fragment of ammunition debris. On 18 December, explosions were reported again in Belgorod, officials claimed that they were the result of anti-aircraft fire; several cars and houses were damaged by debris, 4 people were wounded in the city itself, and 1 person was killed in the suburbs, local Telegram channels also posted images showing thick black smoke rising over the city.

More explosions were reported elsewhere in Belgorod Oblast, a poultry farm was reportedly hit. Two people, including an employee of the farm, died as a result of the explosions, three other employees were also wounded during the alleged attack; local Telegram channels showed videos allegedly showing the aftermath of the attack. On 25 December, three soldiers were killed in another attack on Engels air base.

=== January–March 2023 ===
On 11 February, the Governor of the Belgorod Oblast reported that Ukrainian Grad missiles had hit the city of Shebekino, and that as a result of the attack, three men had been wounded, one building of an industrial enterprise had been destroyed and a bus stop, as well as three private cars, had been damaged. Another attack with Grad rockets was reported later, with local authorities claiming that the missiles had hit two private houses, one of which caught on fire as result of the strike.

On 22 February, regional authorities reported that two people had been injured by shelling in Shebekino, and that three houses were damaged from shelling in Pervoye Tseplyayevo. On 28 February, a Rosneft oil depot in Tuapse, Krasnodar Krai, caught on fire after an alleged drone attack. Locals reported several explosions in the depot, which local officials blamed on two drones that allegedly crashed into the terminal and exploded. The boiler room was reportedly damaged, although the local government denied any damage to the facility's oil tanks; there were no victims, and the fire was quickly extinguished. On the same day, an FSB border service observation tower was damaged by an UAV, allegedly from Ukraine.

On 4 March, a drone carrying an improvised explosive device attacked a substation of the Transneft-Druzhba oil pipeline in Belgorod Oblast. Four people were evacuated, but no injuries were reported. On 6 March, more attacks were reported in Kursk and Belgorod Oblasts. Starovoyt claimed the village of Iskra suffered power outages after energy facilities reported damages during the attack. According to Belgorod Oblast Governor Vyacheslav Gladkov, in the town of Novy Oskol, although three missiles were shot down, one civilian was injured and several buildings in the town were damaged, in addition to power outages.

On 15 March, two missiles were downed by air defense systems over the city of Belgorod, according to Belgorod Oblast Governor Gladkov, with no injuries or damage reported. On 27 March, a drone attacked a gas station in Belgorod late in the evening; no casualties were reported.

=== April 2023 ===
On 6 April, a drone with several cameras crashed in the Fakel Machine-Building Design Bureau in Khimki, Moscow Oblast; the drone was allegedly downed by communication jammers, and was found by security guards patrolling the region. On 9 April, Belgorod Governor Gladkov claimed that Ukrainian forces had shelled the border town of Voznesenovka, Shebekinsky District; two houses and one farm were damaged by shells, but no casualties were reported.

On 10 April, a drone carrying a bomb crashed into a fence at Belgorod airport, no casualties were reported, but the explosion damaged the airport's fence and alarm system. On 16 April, a drone attacked an electrical substation in Belgorod, no casualties were reported.

=== May 2023 ===
On 3 May, Russia said it had shot down two drones over the Moscow Kremlin and accused Ukraine of sending them to assassinate President Vladimir Putin. The Ukrainian government denied the accusations, calling them fabricated. Also on 3 May, several explosions and a fire were reported early on the morning at the Port of Taman, near the village of Volna, Krasnodar Krai, images show flames and smoke over what is believed to be large fuel tanks, no casualties were reported, Russian media outlets blamed the explosions and subsequent fire on an alleged Ukrainian drone attack; the port is about 15 km from the Crimean Bridge and is used as a logistic hub for operations in Southern Ukraine.

Another attack was reported on the same day in Bryansk Oblast, where five Ukrainian drones allegedly attacked a military airfield. Two drones reportedly hit their targets on the airfield, whereas two were destroyed and one was not found. No casualties were reported, and one unoperated An-124 military transport aircraft was slightly damaged during the attack, according to local media outlets.

On 4 May, early in the morning, an unidentified drone struck the territory of the military unit No. 45117 in the town of Buturlinovka, Voronezh Oblast; this was followed by another alleged Ukrainian drone attack at the Novoshakhtinsk oil refinery in the village of Kiselyovka, Rostov Oblast; the drone crashed and exploded at the Refinery's inter-shop flyover, which was under construction. The fire was quickly put out and no casualties were reported.

On 10 May, an unidentified drone struck an administrative building in Starodub, Bryansk Oblast; another drone also dropped an explosive device on the Klintsy oil depot (owned by Rosneft) in Bryansk proper on 11 May. The concrete base and oil products storage tank were partially damaged, while no casualties were reported; regional governor Alexander Bogomaz blamed Ukraine for the attacks. On 14 May, an unidentified drone dropped an explosive device on the roof of a military warehouse in Suzemka District of Bryansk Oblast, near the border with Ukraine; there were no casualties, although some of the equipment there was damaged.

On 15 May, a drone allegedly crashed into a border post in Bryansk Oblast in the evening, injuring five border guards. Another attack was also reported in Sudzhansky District of Kursk Oblast; according to Governor Starovoyt, a drone dropped a bomb on a working excavator, inflicting minor injuries on the operator. On 30 May, Moscow was attacked by drones.

=== June–July 2023 ===
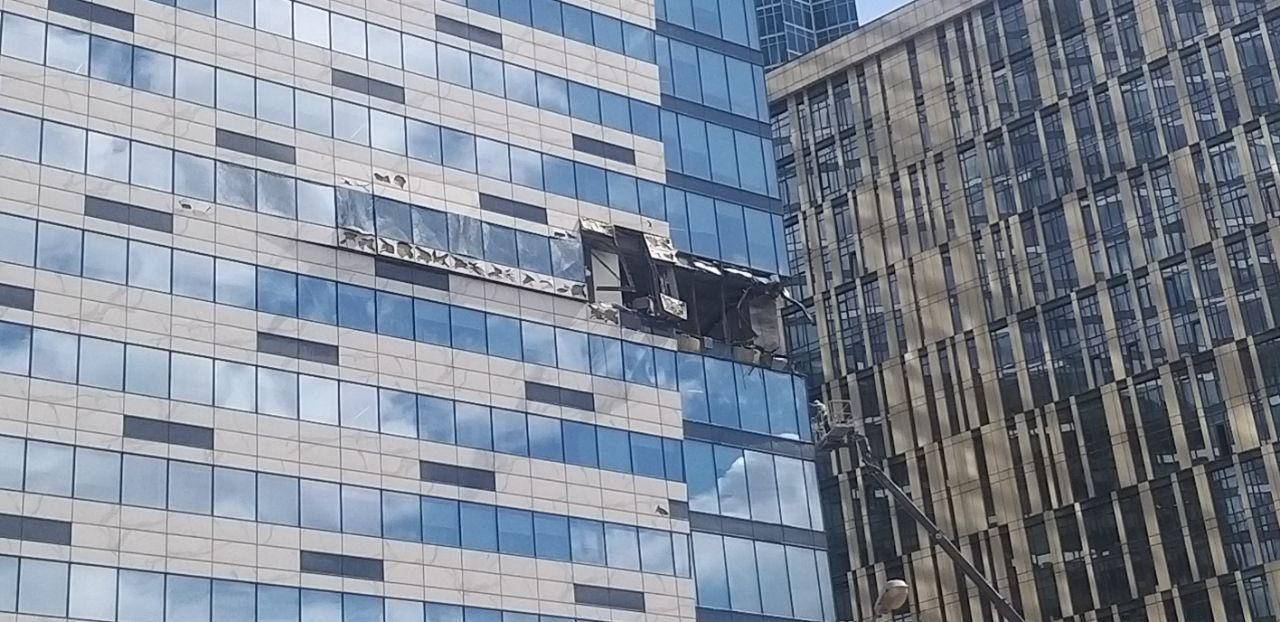
Damage on the IQ-quarter housing government offices caused by a Ukrainian drone strike in Moscow, 30 July 2023

- 9 June: three people were reportedly injured when a drone struck a building in the city of Voronezh.
- 19 June: the governor of Belgorod Oblast claimed that seven people were injured by shelling in Valuyki.
- 2 July: a missile was shot down near Primorsko-Akhtarsk air base in Krasnodar Krai, leaving a large crater.
- 4 July: Russia claimed to have shot down four drones outside Moscow while jamming a fifth with electronic warfare, forcing it to crash in the Odintsovo district of Moscow Oblast. No casualties were reported. Flights from Vnukovo International Airport were suspended.
- 8–9 July: Russian forces claimed to have shot down four Ukrainian missiles over Belgorod, Bryansk and Rostov Oblasts, destroying a sawmill.
- 16 July: a woman was reportedly killed by Ukrainian shelling in Shebekino, Belgorod Oblast.
- 28 July: A missile was shot down over the city of Taganrog, and another near Azov, Rostov Oblast. Fourteen people were injured. A bomb was detonated at the Kuibyshev oil refinery in Samara Oblast.
- 30 July: A Ukrainian drone strike on Moscow damaged the IQ-quarter and OKO skyscrapers of the MIBC and led to an hour-long suspension of operations at Vnukovo International Airport. The Russian military claimed to have intercepted three drones, two of which hit the buildings.
- 31 July: a police station in Bryansk Oblast was reportedly hit by a drone.

=== August 2023 ===
- 1 August:
  - Several drones were shot down over Moscow, but one struck the IQ-quarter, which housed federal government offices. Vnukovo Airport was briefly closed again.
  - A military recruitment office in St Petersburg was set on fire by a man who claimed to have been contacted by the FSB to "gain access to documents sent to Ukraine". Russian media said it was the ninth such attack on recruitment centers across the country in recent days, which authorities attributed to "phone scammers".
- 4 August:
  - Ukrainian sources reported that Ukrainian drone boats severely damaged the Olenegorsky Gornyak, a Russian landing ship, in a naval attack on Novorossiysk, Krasnodar Krai.
  - two government buildings were reportedly damaged in a drone attack in Kursk.
- 18 August: a drone was shot down over Moscow's business district, crashing into and damaging the Expocentre.
- 19 August: a Russian Tupolev Tu-22M bomber was destroyed by a drone strike at Soltsy air base, Novgorod Oblast in northwestern Russia. It was believed to be the first attack of its kind in the region.
- 20 August: A drone reportedly set fire to the roof of Kursk railway station, injuring five people. More drones were downed in Rostov Oblast, Belgorod and Moscow, forcing the closure of Vnukovo and Domodedovo airports.
- 21 August: Two people were reportedly injured by wreckage from a drone shot down over Moscow. Some fifty flights were disrupted at Vnukovo, Domodedovo, Sheremetyevo and Zhunovsky airports. Ukraine's Main Intelligence Directorate (the HUR) said it oversaw a drone attack on the Shaykovka military air base in Kaluga Oblast.
- 22 August: Two drones were shot down near Moscow, with one hitting a 25-story building in Krasnogorsk, and forcing the closure of the city's major airports. Two other drones were shot down over Bryansk Oblast.
- 23 August: The Governor of Belgorod Oblast said that a drone struck a sanatorium in the village of Lavy, killing three. Another drone was downed over central Moscow, crashing into a high-rise building under construction, and forcing the closure of the city's airports.
- 25 August: The Russian Defense Ministry said it shot down an S-200 missile near Shaykovka military air base in Kaluga Oblast. Explosions were also reported in Tula Oblast.
- 26 August: Another drone was shot down near Moscow, prompting the closure of the city's airports. The governor of Belgorod Oblast claimed that a drone killed one person in the village of Shchetinovka, and that Ukrainian shelling damaged buildings and injured four in the village of Urazovo,
- 27 August: the Security Service of Ukraine (SBU) said it launched sixteen drones in an overnight attack on a military air base in Kursk Oblast, which destroyed four Russian Su-30 fighter jets and one MIG-29, and damaged anti-aircraft systems.
- 30 August: Ukraine reportedly launched a wave of drone strikes overnight on six regions in western Russia. One struck Pskov Airport, near the Estonian border, destroying two Ilyushin Il-76 transport aircraft and damaging two others. The raid was launched from within Russia, according to Kyrylo Budanov, head of the Ukrainian HUR. Ukrainian officials, who did not claim responsibility for the attacks, claimed that a fuel depot in Kaluga and a microelectronics factory in Bryansk were also struck.

=== September 2023 ===
- 1 September: A drone reportedly damaged a factory that made components for rockets in Lyubertsy, Moscow Oblast, forcing the closure of airports in the area. At least two buildings were reportedly damaged in another drone strike in Kurchatov, Kursk Oblast.
- 2 September: the governor of Belgorod Oblast claimed that Ukrainian shelling killed one person in Urazovo.
- 7 September: Another wave of drone attacks was reported across Russia. In Rostov-on-Don, three buildings were damaged in a reported strike by two drones at the headquarters of the Southern Military District. Another drone fell on a military base in Volgograd Oblast, the first such incident in the region, while another drone started a fire at an industrial facility in Bryansk.
- 17 September: a drone damaged an oil depot in Oryol.
- 20 September: a fuel storage tank caught fire near Sochi airport following a suspected drone strike.
- 24 September: The governor of Kursk Oblast claimed that a government building was damaged by a Ukrainian drone in Kursk city. Ukrainian military intelligence claimed that a drone strike on the Khalino air field in the same region killed or wounded the commander and other officers of the Russian 14th Guards Fighter Aviation Regiment.
- 29 September: Russian officials said Ukrainian drones dropped explosives on an electrical substation in the village of Belaya in Kursk Oblast, cutting power to five settlements. A dozen other drones were reportedly shot down over Belgorod, Kursk and Kaluga Oblasts. A radar station near Giryi, Kursk Oblast was reportedly destroyed by a drone.

=== October 2023 ===
- 1 October: Ukrainian exploding drones reportedly struck Adler air base in Sochi and an aircraft factory operated by the state-run Tactical Missile Armament corporation in Smolensk.
- 4 October: Russia claimed to have shot down 31 Ukrainian drones during an overnight raid on its western border regions. A Russian S-400 missile system was reportedly struck by drones near Belgorod.
- 7 October: One person was reportedly killed by Ukrainian shelling in Urazovo, Belgorod Oblast. The Russian Defense Ministry claimed to have destroyed three Tochka-U missiles over the region and thwarted a drone attack on Moscow.
- 10 October: A couple was reportedly killed by Ukrainian shelling in Popovka, Belgorod Oblast. A Russian conscript was killed while five other soldiers were wounded in an attack in Gudovka, Bryansk Oblast.
- 12 October: two people were reportedly killed in a house fire caused by falling drone wreckage in Belgorod Oblast.
- 15 October: Russia claimed to have shot down 27 drones over Kursk and Belgorod Oblasts. An attack on an energy facility in Krasnaya Yaruga, Belgorod Oblast, caused blackouts in the area.
- 18 October: Russia said it had shot down 28 drones over Kursk and Belgorod Oblasts as well as over the Black Sea. A military camp near Khalino air base in Kursk was reportedly struck by drones launched by Ukraine's SBU.
- 26 October: Russia claimed that three drones tried to attack the Kursk Nuclear Power Plant. The FSB claimed to have killed a man in a shootout in Tver, who was working for Ukrainian intelligence.
- 29 October: A drone caused a fire at the Afipsky oil refinery near Novorossiysk. Ukrainian media reported that the attack was organized by the SBU.

=== November 2023 ===
- 3 November: Ukrainian military intelligence said that a car belonging to Igor Kuznetsov, the CEO of the Russian arms manufacturer GosNIImash, was set on fire in Nizhniy Novgorod by members of the "resistance movement".
- 11 November: The governor of Belgorod Oblast said that three houses, power lines and five railway carriages were damaged in a Ukrainian drone and missile strike on Valuyki.
- 14 November: A munitions factory in Seltso, Bryansk Oblast was reportedly damaged by a Ukrainian drone, while other drones were shot down in Moscow, Tambov, and Oryol Oblasts.
- 26 November: Following a Russian drone wave attack on Kyiv, Russian forces downed 24 Ukrainian drones over Moscow Oblast, Tula Oblast, Kaluga Oblast, Smolensk Oblast and Bryansk Oblast. One civilian was injured in Tula when a downed drone struck an apartment building. Flights from major Moscow airports were halted. A "booster" from a Russian Pantsir missile system smashed into a wall of a two-story home in Moscow.
- 29 November: a warehouse storing Shahed drones in Bryansk was reportedly attacked by Ukrainian drones.

=== December 2023 ===
On 30 December 2023, the city of Belgorod was shelled allegedly by the Armed Forces of Ukraine, killing at least 24 people and wounding over 100.

=== January 2024 ===
- 1 January 2024: there were explosions reported in Belgorod once again. On 2 January, Belgorod was reportedly shelled several times. A Russian bomber dropped a bomb onto Petropavlovka, Voronezh Oblast due to an "emergency" and caused widespread damage.

In January 2024, Ukrainian drone strikes began targeting oil and gas terminals in Russia. Ukrainian journalist Illia Ponomarenko said that "Russia finances its military from oil exports. You can't persuade countries like India and China to stop buying it. So you knock out Russian oil refineries."

- 9 January: A fuel depot and another energy facility in Oryol Oblast were reportedly attacked by Ukrainian drones, injuring three people. A woman was claimed killed in another attack on the border village of Gornal in Kursk Oblast.
- 18 January: A Ukrainian drone was shot down over Vasilevsky Island in Saint Petersburg; the first aerial attack on the city since the invasion began. The drone crashed into St Petersburg Oil Terminal. Reportedly, three kilograms of high explosives detonated, burning an area of some 130 square metres. A drone also flew over one of Putin's official residences in Valday, Novgorod Oblast, while another was shot down over Moscow. A source from Ukraine's security service acknowledged responsibility.
- 19 January: An oil depot in Klintsy, Bryansk Oblast, was struck in a Ukrainian drone strike, starting a fire covering an area of some 1,000 square metres. The authorities in Bryansk reported no casualties at the time and the Bryansk governor claimed the drone was intercepted near the town of Klintsy and its explosives then fell on the oil depot. Another drone was reported to have struck a gunpowder factory in Tambov.
- 21 January: There was a Ukrainian drone strike on the Novatek gas terminal at Ust-Luga, Leningrad Oblast. Russian authorities said two storage facilities and a pumping station were damaged. Drone strikes were also reported at the Shcheglovskiy Val plant in Tula, which produces Pantsir missile systems, the Smolensk Aviation Plant, and in Oryol Oblast.
- 25 January: Fires were reported at Tuapse oil terminal, Krasnodar Krai. Locals reported several drones in the air at the time.
- 31 January: A drone crashed into the grounds of the Nevsky Mazut oil refinery in St Petersburg, causing an explosion and fire. Russian media blamed the blast on a S-400 missile that was fired at a drone but lost control, crashing into the refinery. All flights from St Petersburg's Pulkovo Airport were suspended.

=== February 2024 ===
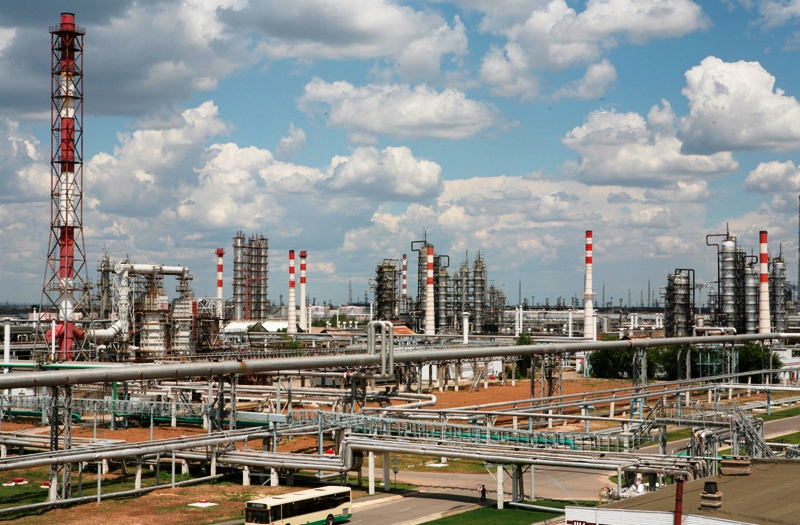
Volgograd oil refinery

- 3 February: Volgograd refinery in Volgograd Oblast, operated by Lukoil, was set on fire in a drone attack. The regional governor said a drone crashed into the refinery after being shot down or jammed.
- 9 February: Russia claimed to have shot down 19 drones over the Black Sea, Krasnodar Krai and in Kursk, Bryansk, and Oryol Oblasts. One of the drones was reported to have started a fire within the premises of the Ilsky oil refinery in Krasnodar Krai.
- 15 February: Russian authorities claimed that Ukraine fired several missiles at Belgorod. They said that fourteen missiles were shot down but one hit and "heavily damaged" a shopping centre in Belgorod city, killing seven people. Russia claimed the missiles were fired from an RM-70 multiple rocket launcher. An oil refinery in Kursk Oblast was set on fire by a Ukrainian drone strike, according to local officials.
- 23 February: The Ukrainian military shot down a Russian Beriev A-50 early warning and control aircraft over Krasnodar Krai, Russia. It was hit over Yeysk and crashed in the Kanevskoy District, at least 120 miles from the front line. Ukrainian sources reported that ten Russian airmen were killed.
- 24 February: The Ukrainian military claimed that its drones set fire to the Novolipetsk Steel plant in Lipetsk.
- 26 February: The Governor of Belgorod Oblast claimed that three people were killed when a Ukrainian drone struck a car in the village of Pochaevo.
- 29 February: The HUR said that a Russian Pantsir S1 anti-aircraft missile system was damaged in an attack in Golovchino, Belgorod Oblast.

=== March 2024 ===
Damage from a drone strike in St Petersburg, 2 March 2024

- 2 March: A drone crashed into a five-storey apartment block in St Petersburg. Residents were evacuated and there were no casualties. Russian media outlets reported that it may have been a Ukrainian drone, shot down as it headed towards a nearby fuel depot.
- 5 March: The HUR claimed responsibility for a drone strike on an oil depot in the Gubkinsky District of Belgorod Oblast.
- 6 March: There were drone strikes on Mikhailovsky Mining and Processing Plant and a warehouse in Zheleznogorsky District of Kursk Oblast. "Several Ukrainian media outlets wrote, citing their sources, that the attack on the Mikhailovsky plant was an operation of Ukrainian intelligence services".
- 8 March: Two people were reportedly killed and a third wounded during Ukrainian drone attacks on Rozhdestvenka, Belgorod Oblast, which came after the Russian Defense Ministry announced it downed several drones over the region.
- 9 March: Russia claimed to have downed some 47 Ukrainian drones, mostly over Rostov Oblast, as well as over Volgograd, Belgorod and Kursk Oblasts. The Beriev Aircraft Company in Taganrog was damaged in the strikes.
- 10 March: A woman was killed and her husband wounded by Ukrainian shelling of Kulbaki, according to the regional governor, who also said that a fire broke out at an oil depot following the downing of a drone. Another drone was shot down in Leningrad Oblast.
- 11 March: A drone struck the administration building in Belgorod city, another caused a power outage in Belgorod Oblast, while Russian authorities said that drone strikes caused fires at oil depots in Nizhny Novgorod and Oryol Oblasts. Several other drones were reportedly shot down over Moscow, Leningrad, Bryansk, Kursk, Tula and Voronezh Oblasts.
- 13 March: Russian forces claimed to have shot down some 60 drones over the country. Drones set fire to Rosneft's Ryazan refinery in Ryazan, the seventh largest in Russia. Another drone was shot down over the Kirishi-2 Oil Refinery, Russia's second largest. Thirty drones were shot down over Voronezh Oblast, causing "minor damage". In Belgorod Oblast, drone wreckage cut power and a gas pipeline.

=== April 2024 ===
- 2 April: Ukrainian drones struck industrial facilities in the Russian republic of Tatarstan, more than 1,300 km (807 miles) from the Ukrainian border. One hit the Yelabuga drone factory, causing "significant damage" according to Ukrainian officials. A local Russian official denied any damage to the factory. Russian media reported a nearby workers' dormitory was damaged, injuring twelve workers. Another drone struck the Tatneft oil refinery in Nizhnekamsk, causing a fire. The strikes were carried out with light aircraft converted into kamikaze drones.
- 5 April: Ukraine launched a barrage of drones into western Russia, targeting four air bases. Ukrainian officials said at least six military aircraft were destroyed, eight others were "heavily damaged", and at least 20 personnel were killed or injured at a military air base near Morozovsk, Rostov Oblast. Security sources reported the air base held Su-27 and Su-34 aircraft, while an open-source intelligence researcher reported the base also held three Su-35 aircraft. Rostov Oblast Governor Vasily Golubev claimed Russia downed 44 Ukrainian drones and that only a 16-storey residential block and power substation were damaged. Eight people were later injured by one of the fallen drone's explosives detonating during an investigation of the site. Drones were also launched at Engels-2 air base in Saratov Oblast, reportedly home to Tu-95 and Tu-22 bombers. The attack allegedly caused "serious damage" to three Tu-95MS bombers and killed seven people. Yeysk Airport, which hosts the aviation units of the 4th Army of the Russian Air Force, was also allegedly struck, with two Su-25 aircraft destroyed. Local officials denied any damage. The Institute for the Study of War found no visual evidence of Russian aircraft being hit at the air bases.
- 9 April: Russian forces claimed to have intercepted a Neptune missile near the Crimean coast.
- 9–10 April: The Russian governor of Bryansk Oblast said two people were killed by Ukrainian shelling in Klimovo, while the governor of Kursk Oblast said three people (including two children) were killed in a Ukrainian drone strike on a car in Korenevsky District.
- 16 April: The SBU said it destroyed a Russian Nebo-U radar system in a drone strike in Bryansk Oblast.
- 17 April: Ukrainian media reported that the HUR launched drone strikes on a radar system in the Russian republic of Mordovia and a factory making bomber aircraft in Tatarstan.
- 19 April: A Russian Tu-22M3 long range strategic bomber crashed in Stavropol Krai while returning to base, killing one crew member, with another missing. Ukraine's HUR claimed to have shot it down, at a range of 308 km, with an S-200 missile. Russian authorities claimed the aircraft crashed due to a technical malfunction.
- 27 April: Ukraine launched a drone wave attack in Russia's Krasnodar Krai, starting fires at the Ilsky and Slavyansk-on-Kuban oil refineries. The Kushchyovskaya air base was also attacked. A number of KAB glide bomb kits were reportedly destroyed along with possibly one Su-34. The HUR also claimed to have hit a Russian Podlet-K1 military radar.

=== May 2024 ===
- 6 May: The governor of Belgorod Oblast said that eight factory workers were killed and 35 others were wounded in a Ukrainian drone strike that hit three vehicles in the village of Berezovka.
- 9 May: The governor of Belgorod Oblast said that eight people were injured in a Ukrainian airstrike in Belgorod city. A drone attack on Krasnodar also set a fuel depot on fire. Another drone struck an oil refinery in Salavat; the first such attack in the Russian republic of Bashkortostan. The drone was a light aircraft that travelled some 1,500 km.
- 11 May: Russian officials said that five people were killed and nine injured by drone strikes in Belgorod and Kursk oblasts.
- 12 May: Russian officials said that 16 people were killed and 27 others were injured when wreckage of a downed Tochka-U missile struck an apartment building in Belgorod. However, independent military experts considered this version unlikely, noting that the building was hit on its northeastern side, which is not facing Ukrainian territory. They said that the origin of the explosion was probably a Russian surface-to-air missile, or a Russian guided aerial bomb dropped accidentally.
- 14 May: Russian state media reported that a drone strike derailed a freight train at Kotluban station in Volgograd Oblast. A storage tank carrying diesel caught fire, another exploded and nine rail cars were derailed. No injuries were reported.
- 23 May: The long-range early nuclear warning system Voronezh-DM in Armavir, southern Russia, was damaged by Ukrainian drone attack.
- 26 May: A Ukrainian drone attacked the Voronezh M long-range radar station near Orsk in Russia's Orenburg Oblast near the Kazakhstan–Russia border.
- 31 May: Ukraine launched Neptune missiles and drones at a ferry crossing and an oil depot in Port Kavkaz, Krasnodar Krai. Various sources reported three petroleum storage tanks were damaged and a fire broke out. Additional facilities at the Kavkaz port were damaged, including a train. A power substation connected to the Crimean Bridge was also damaged. Russian authorities claimed that two people were injured in the attack on the depot.

=== June 2024 ===
- 1 June: Ukraine reportedly fired HIMARS rockets into Russia for the first time. Russian officials said that 10 HIMARS rockets were shot down over Belgorod Oblast. On 3 June, a Russian S-300/400 missile system was destroyed by HIMARS rockets in Belgorod.
- 6 June: there were several explosions and a fire at the Novoshakhtinsk oil refinery, which the governor of Rostov Oblast claimed was caused by a drone attack.
- 8 June: The HUR claimed to have damaged two Russian Su-57 fighter jets for the first time using drones, during a strike on the Akhtubinsk air base in Astrakhan Oblast. Imagery released by the HUR as well as a Telegram channel close to the Russian Aerospace Forces confirmed that one Su-57 was damaged. Russia claimed to have shot down three Ukrainian drones targeting an air base near Mozdok, in the first such attack in North Ossetia-Alania since the war began.
- 14 June: The HUR said that two Russian Su-34s were damaged in a Ukrainian drone strike on the Morozovsk air base in Rostov Oblast, with unconfirmed reports of Russian six pilots killed and 10 soldiers wounded. Russian officials also said that drones struck power plants in Rostov and Voronezh Oblasts.
- 15 June: the governor of Belgorod Oblast claimed that five people were killed by Ukrainian shelling in Shebekino.
- 17 June: Ukraine launched a drone attack on western Russia, with the HUR claiming to have struck a metallurgical plant and military production facilities in Belgorod, Voronezh, and Lipetsk Oblasts.
- 20 June: Russian media reported an attack by Ukrainian drones on the Afipsky oil refinery in Krasnodar Krai, as well as in oil depots in Tambov Oblast and Enem, Adygea. Authorities also claimed that drones were shot down over Bryansk, Rostov, Belgorod and Oryol Oblasts. One person was killed in a drone strike in Slavyansk-on-Kuban.
- 21 June: Russia said that Ukraine launched over 100 drones at Crimea, Krasnodar Krai, and Volgograd Oblast. Russia's Defense Ministry said that 43 drones were shot down over Krasnodar Krai, a further 70 over Crimea and one in Volgograd. Russian officials claimed one person in Krasnodar Krai was killed and six injured. Reports suggested that a fire broke out at the Ilya refinery in Krasnodar Krai. The Yeysk air base, also in Krasnodar Krai, was attacked. Ukraine said that a Neptune missile was used to strike the Shahed drone depot and training facility in Krasnodar.
- 25 June: The HUR claimed to have blown up a Russian ammunition depot in Voronezh Oblast. The governor of Belgorod Oblast claimed that one person was killed in a drone strike.
- 28 June: the governor of Tambov Oblast said that an oil depot was set on fire by a drone strike.
- 29 June: Russian officials said that five people, including two children, were killed in a Ukrainian drone strike in Gorodishche, Kursk Oblast.

=== July 2024 ===
- 9 July: Russia claimed to have shot down 38 drones over Belgorod, Voronezh, Astrakhan, Kursk, and Rostov oblasts. An oil depot was set on fire in Kalach-na-Donu, Volgograd Oblast, along with two power substations. Russian sources claimed one killed and two injured in Belgorod Oblast. Ukrainian drones also struck a Russian missile testing facility at Kapustin Yar.
- 13 July: the governor of Rostov Oblast said an oil depot was set on fire by a drone strike in Tsimlyansky District.
- 17 July: the governor of Belgorod Oblast said that two people were killed in a drone strike on the border village of Tserkovny.
- 20 July: Sixteen explosions and several fires were reported near Millerovo air base in Rostov Oblast, following a drone strike.
- 23 July: the governor of Krasnodar Krai said that a Ukrainian drone attack on a ferry in Port Kavkaz killed one person and started a fire on board.
- 24 July: A GRU officer and his wife were wounded by a bomb planted under their car in Moscow.
- 25 July: the governor of Belgorod Oblast said one person was killed and two others were injured by Ukrainian shelling in Shebekino.
- 27 July: Ukrainian drones reportedly struck the Olenya air base in Murmansk Oblast, some 1,800 kilometers from the Ukrainian border, damaging two Tu-22M3s. Engels and Dyagilevo airfields were also attacked, along with an oil refinery in Ryazan.
- 28 July: A Ukrainian drone attack struck an oil deport in Polevaya, Kursk Oblast causing a multi-day fire detected by NASA's FIRMS.
- 31 July: Russian forces claimed to have intercepted a Neptune missile and 19 drones over Belgorod, Bryansk, Kursk, Kaluga, and Rostov oblasts. The acting governor of Kursk, Alexei Smirnov, said that a facility caught fire after midnight. Ukraine said it was a "storage facility for weapons and military equipment". Fires at two military facilities south of Kursk Vostochny Airport were detected by NASA's FIRMS.

=== August 2024 ===
Damage from a Ukrainian drone strike in Saratov, 26 August 2024

- 3 August: A major drone attack was made on Morozovsk air base with locals posting multiple large explosions, including secondary explosions.
- 8 August: The Lipetsk air base was struck by a large-scale Ukrainian drone attack that caused numerous explosions and fires and reportedly injured six people.
- 14 August: One of the most numerous UAV attacks on Russian territory was carried out, with 117 drones being used. Of these, 11 drones hit the Savasleyka air base in the Nizhny Novgorod Oblast, which became the most numerous attack since the beginning of hostilities. Governor of Nizhny Novgorod Oblast Gleb Nikitin said that all targets were shot down by the air defense system, there were no destructions or losses.
- 18 August: An attack on an oil depot in Proletarsk, approximately 250 kilometers from the Ukrainian border, resulted in a massive multi-day fire at the extensive petroleum tank farm. The tank farm was still burning on 23 August 2024, while Ukrainian Armed Forces struck it again on that day.
- 21 August: Russia announced it had intercepted 11 Ukrainian attack drones heading towards Moscow.
- 22 August: Marinovka air base was attacked by Ukrainian drones, resulting in explosions and a fire at the air base.
- 26 August: During an attack on the Omsk refinery, an explosion and subsequent fire destroyed the crude distillation unit CDU-11, one of the "two largest primary refining units at the plant" responsible for roughly one-third of plant capacity.
- 28 August: The Atlas oil depot, located in the Kamenski District of Rostov Oblast, was attacked. This depot is a division of the Federal Agency for State Reserves in the Southern Federal District, specializing in supplying petroleum products to the Russian Armed Forces. A second drone attack on the depot occurred late in the day, renewing the "powerful blaze".
- 28 August: The Zenit oil depot, in Kotelnich, Kirov Oblast, was attacked. This facility is located more than 1,200 kilometers away from the Ukrainian border.
- 31 August: Belgorod Oblast governor Vyacheslav Gladkov claimed that five civilians were killed in Ukrainian missile strikes on Belgorod.

=== September 2024 ===
Satellite image of the fires following the Ukrainian strike on an ammo depot in Tikhoretsk, September 2024

- 1 September: Ukraine launched over a hundred drones against targets in Russia, including the Konakovo Power Station in Konakovo, Tver Oblast and the Moscow Refinery in Moscow.
- 10 September: Ukraine launched 144 drones against Moscow in the largest drone attack against Russia in the war, with Russian authorities reporting dozens of homes being damaged and two people killed by the attack.
- 18 September: In the early morning, Ukraine launched a successful drone attack on the Main Missile and Artillery Directorate (GRAU) 107th Ammunition Depot in Toropets, causing a massive series of explosions and fires which damaged much of the town. The attack resulted in an earthquake-magnitude blast, and NASA FIRMS satellites detected the resulting fires over an area of approximately 13 km^{2} (5 sq mi). The blast wave spread up to 200 mi (320 km) and was estimated to be consistent with 200–240 tonnes of TNT (840–1,000 GJ) of high-explosives detonating. The Security Service of Ukraine claimed that "Iskander, Tochka and KAB missiles" were stored at the facility. Russian officials reported that 13 people had been injured and that an evacuation of the area had been ordered. The Estonian Defense Forces Intelligence Center subsequently estimated that the strike had caused 30,000 tonnes of munitions to explode.
- 21 September: On the night of 20–21 September 2024, Ukraine launched drone attacks on two Russian ammunition depots—the 23rd Arsenal of the GRAU near the village of Oktyabrsky in Tver Oblast and the 719th Artillery Ammunition Base near Tikhoretsk and the Tikhoretsk air base in Krasnodar Krai.

=== October 2024 ===
- 3 October: Ukrainian drones struck the Borisoglebsk air base in the Voronezh Oblast, targeting Su-34s, Su-35s, fuel tanks and a warehouse for Russian glide bombs.
- 10 October: A Ukrainian drone attack targeted the Khanskaya air base near Maykop causing a fire detected by NASA's FIRMS.

=== November 2024 ===
- 6 November: An A-22 light aircraft converted into a drone struck the Kaspiysk naval base, reportedly damaging two Gepard-class frigate s and one Buyan-class corvette of the Caspian Flotilla.
- 8–9 November: Ukrainian drones attacked the Aleksin Chemical Plant—part of the state corporation Rostec—in the Aleksinsky District, about 190 km (120 mi) south of Moscow, causing a series of explosions and fires at the plant which manufactures ammunition and explosives for the Russian military. Russian sources did not acknowledge the attack's success, "as is common following a reported attack by Ukraine on one of [Russia's] military sites."
- 10 November: At least 34 Ukrainian drones attacked Moscow.
- 14 November: Ukrainian drones attacked the Krymsk air base in Krasnodar Krai, where Su-27 and Su-30 fighter jets and Ka-27 helicopters are stationed. The Russian MOD said they shot down 51 drones using conventional air defense capabilities and that no casualties were reported.
- 17 November: The Center for Countering Disinformation reported that several drones struck the Izhevsk Electromechanical Plant.
- 20 November: Ukrainian drones struck the 13th Arsenal of the Main Missile and Artillery Directorate located in Kotovo, Novgorod Oblast, some 680 kilometres from the Ukrainian border. Residents of Kotovo were evacuated to nearby Okulovka as a precaution, with several drones being reported as being shot down by Russian air defences.
- 22 November 2024: Multiple Storm Shadow missiles were used by Ukraine to attack the Maryino estate, located 32 km behind the front lines in Kursk, a Russian army command post and communications hub. According to The Wall Street Journal, a North Korean general officer was wounded in the attack.
- 22 & 25 November: The Rosneft Kaluga oil storage depot was attacked again by Ukrainian drones. Russian sources claimed air defences to have shot down two missiles and 27 drones. However, fires continued to burn at the depot on the 24th, and additional drones attacked on the 25th resulting in explosions and fires. The 25 November fire was detected by NASA FIRMS. By 28 November, three of the ten Kaluga storage tanks had been completely destroyed in the multi-day fires.

=== December 2024 ===
- 1 December: According to Russian authorities, Ukrainian drone attacks took place in the Bryansk and Kaluga regions.
- 14 December: An oil depot in Oryol was attacked and set on fire by Ukrainian drones. Russian social media reported explosions and the governor confirmed a fire had broken out at an "infrastructure facility".
- 19 December: An oil refinery in Novoshakhtinsk was struck by Ukrainian drones and missiles, according to the General Staff of the Armed Forces of Ukraine. The involvement of the Ukrainian Navy and recent attacks near the facility pointed to the use of Neptune missiles.
- 21 December: Kazan International Airport in Tatarstan and Gagarin Airport in the city of Saratov were temporarily closed due to Ukrainian drone attacks.
- 25 December: According to Russian authorities, Ukrainian drones attacked the cities of Grozny, Mozdok and Vladikavkaz in the North Caucasus.
- 27 December: Airports in Sochi, Kazan, Samara, Grozny, Makhachkala, Volgograd and Astrakhan were temporarily closed due to the threat of drone attacks.
- 31 December: Multiple Storm Shadow long-range missiles struck Lgov hitting a Russian command bunker and a Russian troop barracks of the 810th Naval Infantry Brigade. Initial Russian news reports were that 8 military members were killed and 22 injured and hospitalized.

=== January 2025 ===
- 14 January: Drones attacked the Kazan Orgsintez chemical plant in the suburbs of Kazan, Tatarstan, nearly 1,000 km (620 mi) from the border with Ukraine, causing a series of explosions and fires in three liquified natural gas (LNG) storage tanks. Russian sources acknowledged the attack. A fuel storage facility supplying the Engels air base was also struck by drones.
- 17 January: Ukrainian drones struck an oil depot in Lyudinovo with falling debris causing a fire.
- 20 January: Ukrainian drones attacked the Gorbunov Kazan Aviation Plant in Kazan, Russia where the Tu-160 strategic bomber is built, about 1,000 km (620 mi) from the border with Ukraine, causing several explosions. Local Russian sources stated that damage was minimal and all drone threats had been neutralized.
- 29 January: Ukraine launched a drone attack on the Kstovo refinery in Nizhny Novgorod, Russia, about 800 km (500 mi) from the border with Ukraine, causing several explosions and resulting in large fires in several units.

Ukrainian military sources claimed that 4 of the 4 drones sent struck their targets. Local residents reported at least three explosions inside the refinery. Russian officials downplayed the extent of the damage. Russian authorities subsequently said the blaze burned for two days and Sibur temporarily halted operations at the plant.

- 31 January: Ukrainian drones attacked the Volgograd refinery, causing a fire at the facility. Russian sources said the fire was quickly extinguished.

=== June 2025 ===
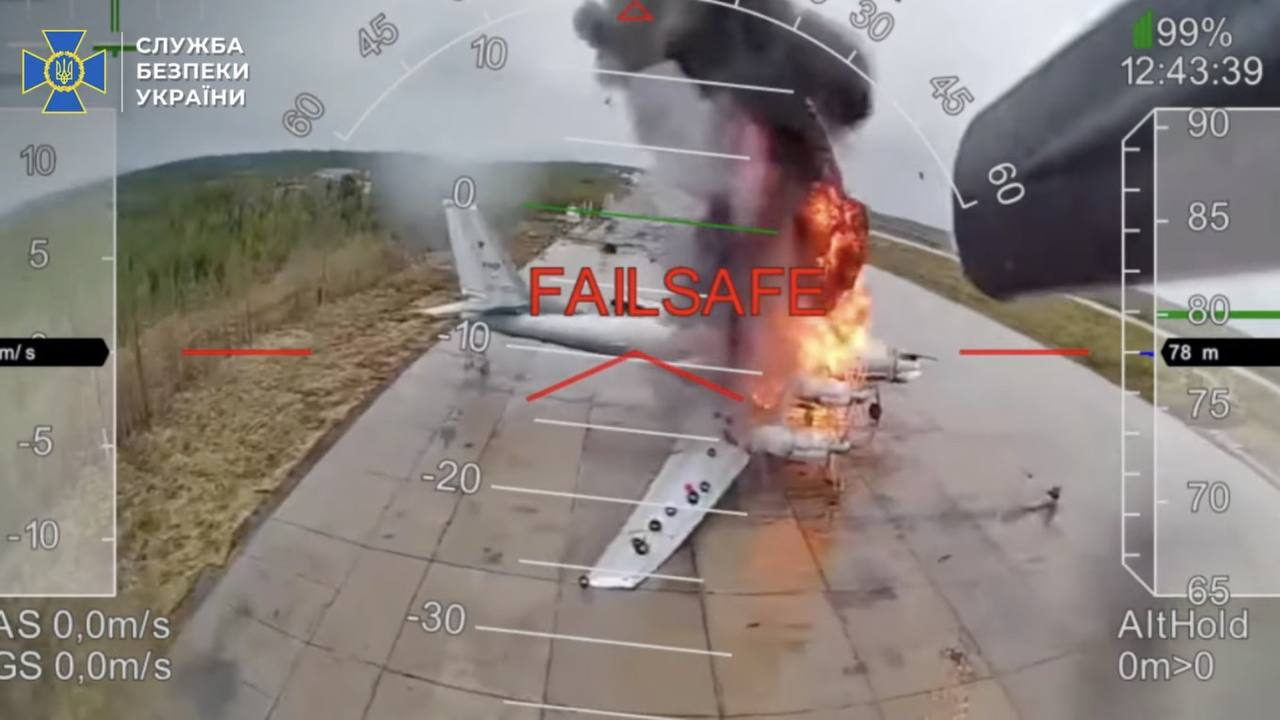
A Russian Tu-95 being struck by Ukrainian drones at Olenya airbase during Operation Spiderweb

- 1 June: SBU struck at least two airfields, those being Olenya air base, in the Arctic, and Belaya air base in Siberia, destroying rows of Russian strategic and nuclear capable bombers. Ukrainian sources claimed further strikes at Diaghilev air base and Ivanovo air base, claiming to have hit over 40 Russian aircraft including the A-50, Tu-95 and Tu-22M3.

=== August 2025 ===
- 7–8 August: An overnight Ukrainian drone strike sparked a fire at the Afipsky refinery in Krasnodar Krai. The regional crisis center reported that drone debris ignited a gas condensate processing unit. The fire was reportedly extinguished by 8:21 a.m. local time.
- 14 August: Russia's military claimed to have downed 9 drones overnight in Volgograd Oblast, while Volgograd's governor claimed that falling drone debris caused a fire at the Volgograd refinery. Extensive fire at the refinery was detected by NASA's FIRMS on 13 August 2025 21:46:00 (UTC).
- 21 August: Ukraine attacked the Unecha oil pumping station in Bryansk Oblast, a critical part of Russia's Druzhba oil pipeline to Europe. Governor of Bryansk Oblast Alexander Bogomaz said on 22 August that an energy facility at Unecha had caught fire following Ukrainian missile and drone attacks. As a result, Russian oil supplies to Hungary and Slovakia were suspended until 28 August.
- 24 August:
  - Russia claimed that the Kursk Nuclear Power Plant was targeted by a Ukrainian drone strike. The attack caused a fire that was quickly extinguished and damaged an auxiliary transformer, leading to a 50% reduction in the operating capacity of one reactor. No injuries were reported, and radiation levels remained within normal limits according to the International Atomic Energy Agency.
  - Governor of Leningrad Oblast Aleksandr Drozdenko said that least 10 Ukrainian drones were downed over the port of Ust-Luga, on the Gulf of Finland, with falling debris sparking a fire at the Novatek-operated terminal.
- 28 August: Ukrainian drones struck the Kuibyshev refinery in Samara Oblast, damaging both of its primary oil refining units as well as secondary units. The refinery had resumed oil refining on 21 August following a major overhaul that started on 1 July 2025.

=== September 2025 ===
Smoke rising after a Ukrainian drone strike in Salavat, Russia on 24 September 2025

- 20 September: Four people were killed and one person was injured in a Ukrainian drone attack on oil refineries in Novokuybyshevsk, Samara Oblast and Saratov, Saratov Oblast, Russia.
- 23 September: Four Flamingo missiles struck a Belgorod factory belonging to the Skif-M company, which manufactures components for the production of the Su-34, Su-35, and Su-57 aircraft. Initially it was reported by Russia that only one missile had hit, but satellite imagery in January showed that all missiles struck the factory. However, one missile appeared to have penetrated the roof and exited through a wall, exploding outside the factory. The blast crater was approximately 25 metres wide. Both Russia and Zelenskyy confirmed the strike on 9 October, marking the first combat use of Flamingo missiles against targets on Russian soil.
- 28 September: A Ukrainian missile struck a power station in Belgorod causing a massive power outage in the Russian city.
- 29 September: Four Neptune missiles, launched by units of the missile and artillery forces of the Armed Forces of Ukraine in cooperation with the Navy, struck the main shop of the Electrodetal plant in Karachev.

=== October 2025 ===
- 4 October: A Russian Buyan-class corvette was allegedly attacked near Lake Onega, in Karelia, Russia. The ship sustained damage to the right side of its power plant compartment.
- 8 October: A Ukrainian missile strike kills three people and injures nine others in Maslova Pristan, Belgorod Oblast, Russia. A search and rescue operation was done for others that were believed to be trapped under rubble.

=== December 2025 ===
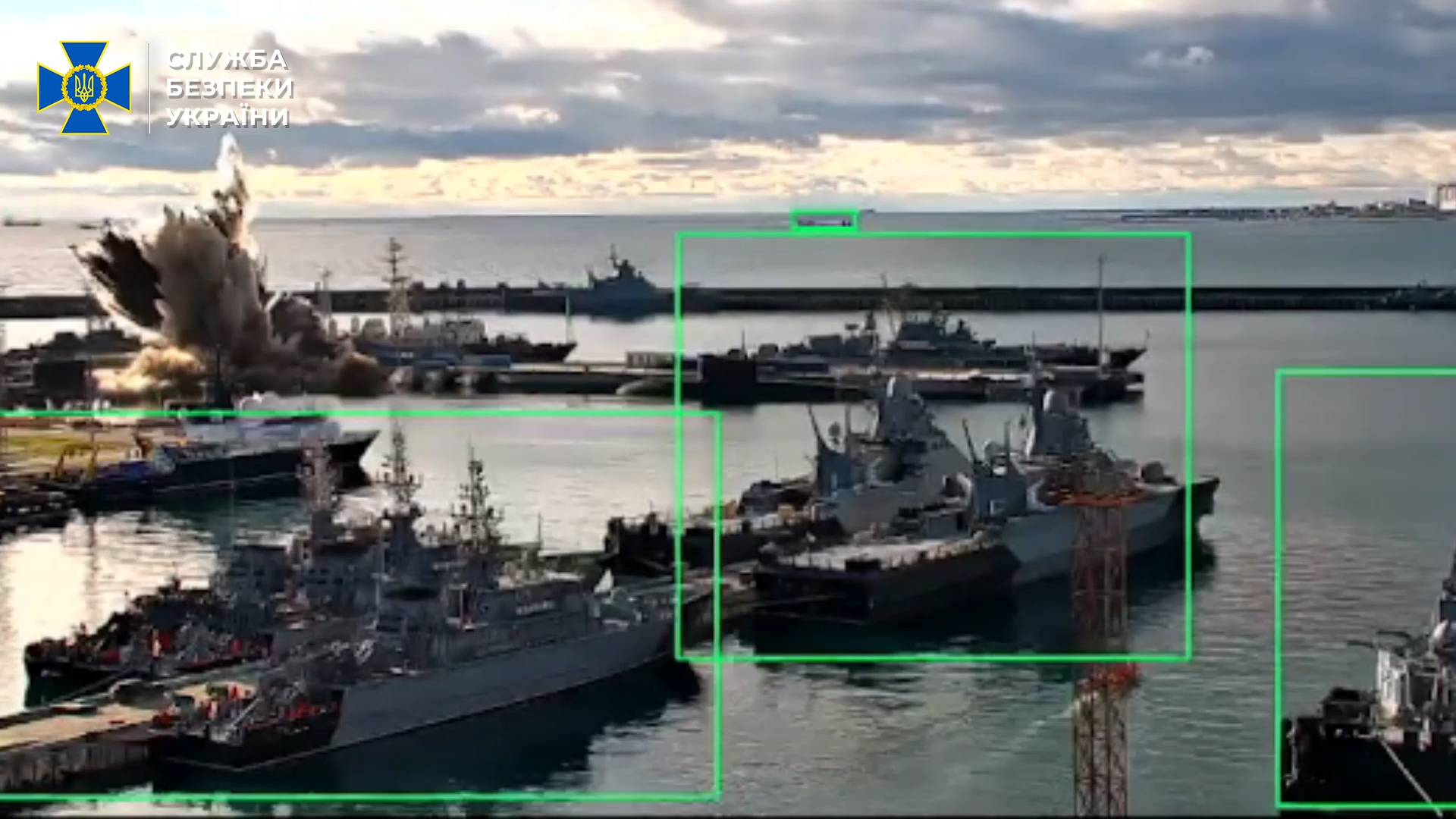
Ukrainian underwater drone attack on the Russian submarine Kolpino in the port of Novorossiysk

- 17 December: Ukrainian forces attacked and damaged a Russian submarine with a naval drone.
- 20 December: For the first time during the war, Ukrainian forces executed an action on Caspian sea against a Russian war ship.
- 22 December: Ukraine launched a series of strikes against Russian targets, damaging an oil terminal, a pipeline, two fighter jets, and two ships. Among the sites hit were the Tamanneftegaz oil terminal, an ammunition depot, and a drone launch facility on Russian soil and in occupied Ukrainian areas. In Russia's Krasnodar region, attacks caused a serious fire involving two docks and two ships. A Ukrainian missile also hit a temporary installation of the Russian 92nd Riverine Brigade in Olenivka, Crimea, while an ammunition depot in the Donetsk region was damaged to hinder Russian advances. On Sunday evening, Ukrainian partisans set fire to two Russian jets at an airfield near Lipetsk. Ukrainian drones attacked a Russian airfield in Crimea damaging a radar facility and destroying two planes and several drones. Attacks came shortly after Russia violently attacked Ukraine with drones and missiles.
- 29 December: 91 Ukrainian drones flew into Russian territory, with the Russian government claiming that this attack targeted Vladimir Putin's residence in the Novgorod region, which the Ukrainian government rejected. On 31 December, the Russian Ministry of Defense released a video detailing the attack, showing a downed drone, and reporting that the drones had been shot down.

=== February 2026 ===
- 8 February: the Ukrainian General Staff claimed to have struck the Russian test range at Kapustin Yar using FP-5 Flamingo missiles.
- 12 February: a Russian Main Missile and Artillery Directorate ammunition depot, near Kotluban, Volgograd Oblast, was attacked by Flamingo missiles resulting in a "series of powerful explosions" and precautionary evacuations of local people according to Governor of Volgograd Oblast Andrey Bocharov.
- 20 February: Ukraine's General Staff stated a strike of Flamingo missiles targeted the Votkinsk Machine Building Plant 1,400 km (870 miles) from Ukraine, which produces Iskander ballistic missiles. Udmurt regional head Alexander Brechalov said one of the republic's facilities was attacked by drones, and unofficial reports specified the site as the Votkinsk Plant.

=== March 2026 ===
- 2 March: Ukrainian drones struck an oil terminal in the Russian port city of Novorossiysk, Krasnodar Krai. Four residential buildings in the area were reportedly damaged in the attack.
- 10 March: Six people were killed and 37 others were injured in a Ukrainian missile attack in Bryansk.
- 21 March: Two people were killed and another was injured in a Ukrainian artillery strike in Belgorod Oblast, Russia.
- 25 March: A Ukrainian drone strike killed two people in Belgorod Oblast, Russia, according to Belgorod governor Vyacheslav Gladkov.
- 28 March: Flamingo missiles struck the JSC Promsintez explosives plant in Chapaevsk, Samara Oblast. Subsequent satellite images showed that the attack "achieved accurate terminal approach but failed to deliver direct structural penetration of the production halls". One missile was shot down "at the last moment", a second struck a lightning rod tower and the third missile detonated close potentially causing "minor peripheral damage".

=== April 2026 ===
- 16 April: Ukrainian drones began striking oil infrastructure in Tuapse.
- 29 April:
  - Ukrainian drones began striking oil infrastructure in Perm.
  - Three people were killed and eight others injured in a separate Ukrainian drone strike on a passenger bus in Voznesenovka, Belgorod Oblast, Russia.

=== May 2026 ===
- 5 May: Zelenskyy tweeted that Ukraine's armed forces had used Flamingos to conduct strikes on targets 1500 km inside Russia, including military-industrial facilities in Cheboksary. The JSC VNIIR-Progress missile plant in Cheboksary was attacked with video on social media showing a large fire. The plant manufactures the Kometa antenna, used in guided missiles and electronic warfare systems. Russian milbloggers and OSINT analysts claimed a Flamingo missile was used during the attack. Footage online showed "a large blast followed by sustained fire". Officials said that at least four Liutyi drones followed up the attack.
- 12 May: Zelenskyy announced that the military had attacked several gas facilities in Orenburg Oblast, Russia.
- 17 May: Ukraine launched a massive drone attack on Russia, killing at least four people, with strikes reported in Moscow and Belgorod Oblast, after ‌facing its largest attack in more than a year.
- 23 May: A Ukrainian drone attack caused a fire at a Transneft oil terminal in Novorossiysk, Krasnodar Krai, Russia.
- 24 May: The Ukrainian Security Service reported that Ukrainian forces had successfully launched an overnight drone strike on the Vtorovo oil pumping station in the Vladimir Oblast in Russia.

=== June 2026 ===
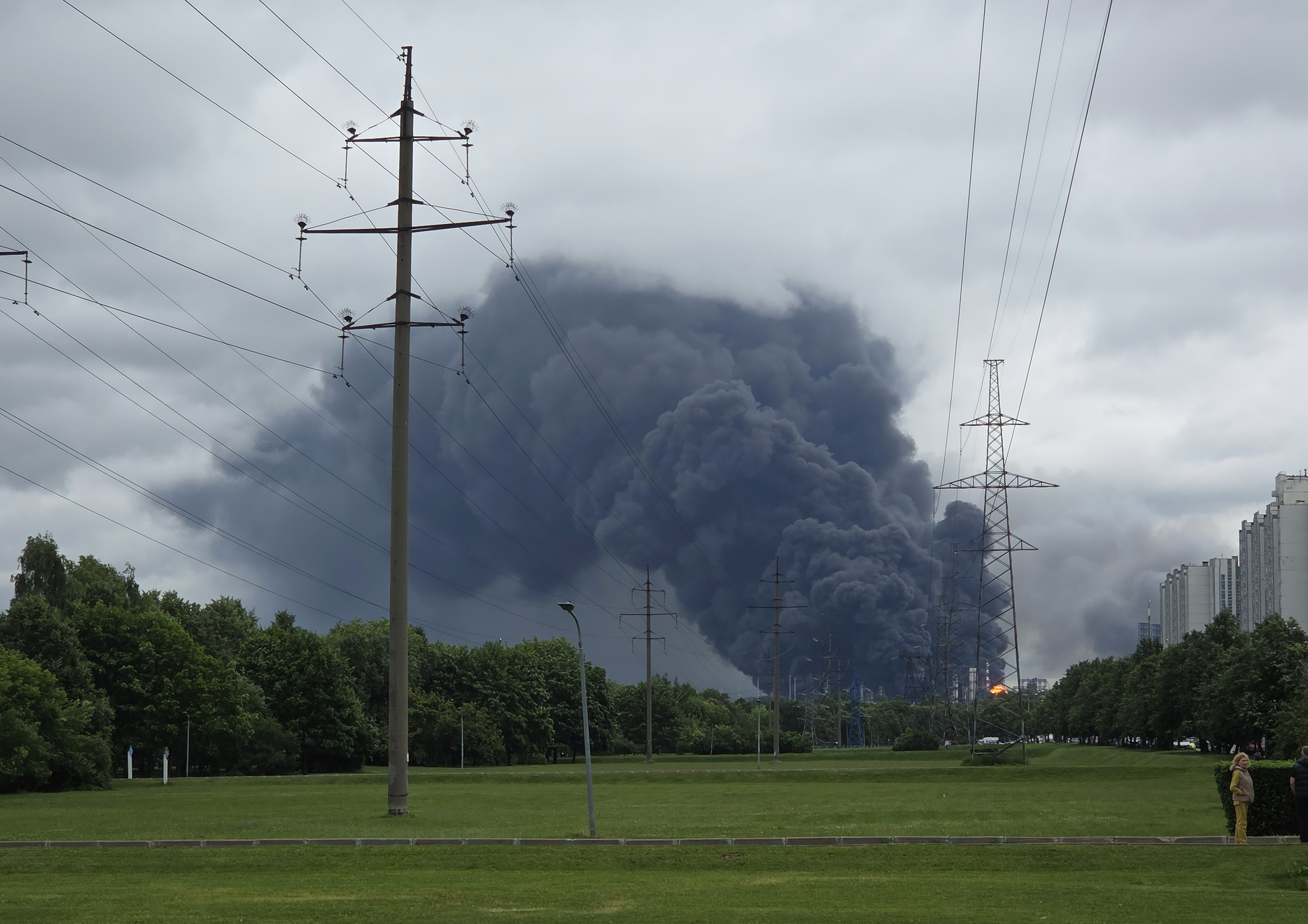
Fire at the Moscow Oil Refinery on 18 June 2026

- 3 June: Ukrainian drones struck an oil terminal in Saint Petersburg, amidst the economic forum scheduled to be held in the city and military facilities at a naval base in Kronstadt.
- 5 June: Ukrainian drones struck two commercial vessels in Taganrog Bay, Rostov Oblast. Five Azerbaijani crew members were killed and three others were injured.
- 10 June: the VNIIR-Progress plant in Cheboksary came under further Flamingo missile attack. Local people reported a "powerful explosion" after the impact, with a plume of smoke over the building. Zelenskyy confirmed the use of Flamingo missiles. The attack is thought to have been carried out by five missiles, two of which were shot down near Chuvashia and one near the target at Cheboksary, with two striking the target. Radar and local people detected the missiles at the beginning of their flight path, over several Russian regions, and on their final approach, which passed Cheboksary itself and reached the VNIIR-Progress plant from the east. This could "indicate the use of routes bypassing large population centers and areas with dense radar coverage".
- 18 June: Ukraine launched its largest ever drone attack on Moscow, targeting the Moscow Refinery and damaging several residential buildings. Residents of Moscow reported oil raining down as massive plumes of black smoke were visible over the city. Following the attack, Ukrainian president Volodymyr Zelenskyy said that "If Ukraine burns, your Moscow will burn", warning against further Russian attacks on the country.
- 24 June: Ukrainian forces launched long-range drone strikes in Russia, striking the Orenburg Gas Processing Plant, which also housed the only helium plant in Russia, and also striking two Russian Satellite Communications Company facilities, including one in Moscow Oblast and another in Vladimir Oblast. Russia said its forces shot down 323 Ukrainian drones overnight.
- 26 June: Ukraine launched its largest drone attack on Russia since the start of the war, with over 660 drones launched at multiple regions, including Moscow Oblast, as Ukrainian president Volodymyr Zelenskyy said he had approved a "40-day campaign" aimed at "compelling Russia to end the war".
- 28 June: Ukrainian forces launched FP-5 Flamingo cruise missiles at strategic targets in Russia, striking the Titan-Barrikady complex in Volgograd, which produced launchers for Russia's Yars and Iskander missile systems. Authorities said ten people had been wounded in the strikes. A separate missile strike destroyed a Pantsir missile system in Crimea.
- 30 June: Ukrainian forces launched a major drone attack on Moscow Oblast, striking the Dubna Space Communications Center to the north of Moscow. Russian authorities said a Ukrainian drone struck a residential building in Yegoryevsk, killing an infant, while another drone strike reportedly killed a 61-year-old woman in Tver Oblast.

=== July 2026 ===
- 19–23 July: Some 19 out of 71 petrol stations in Belgorod have been damaged by Ukrainian drone strikes. Resulting in some 26.7% of the city's, and surrounding suburbs, fuel infrastructure being damaged.

=== August 2026 ===
- 9 August: Ukrainian drones struck Belgorod, killing six people and damaging apartment buildings and other structures.
- 10 August: Ukrainian drones struck the TANECO oil refinery in Nizhnekamsk, Tatarstan, killing 13 people and damaging the refinery and nearby facilities.
- 12 August: Ukrainian drones and missiles struck Novorossiysk, a major Russian Black Sea port, damaging port infrastructure, air-defence systems and naval facilities; Russian authorities also reported civilian casualties and damage to a grain terminal.
- 14–15 August: Ukrainian long-range strikes targeted Russian oil infrastructure and logistics facilities, including the Ust-Luga oil terminal on the Baltic Sea.
- 16 August: Ukrainian forces launched 822 drones at Russia, including more than 600 towards Moscow, killing at least seven people and injuring 39 others. A Wildberries warehouse was also destroyed. Strikes also caused casualties and fires in reported attacks on Russian military infrastructure in Rostov, Samara and Nizhny Novgorod.

=== September 2026 ===
- 9 September: Ukrainian drones struck the port of Makhachkala in Dagestan, the northernmost year-round ice-free port on the Caspian Sea. Port infrastructure was damaged following multiple explosions and fires. There were no casualties according to Russian reports.
- 20 September: A major attack on Moscow with FP-1 drones, Flamingo cruise missiles and first-use of a Pelican ballistic missile. Among other targets, the Kapotnya Refinery was struck again, with multiple fires, and smoke rising that could be seen across the city. Moscow's mayor, Sergey Sobyanin, described the drone raid as the "largest ever", while stating that Russian air defenses intercepted over 1,600 drones in the previous day.

== Sabotage ==
- 25 June 2022: The Combat Organization of Anarcho-Communists sabotaged a railway line near Moscow to hinder the supply of equipment to a military base. They issued a statement online saying: "Every stopped train means less shells and rockets to fly into peaceful Ukrainian cities ... We call on everyone to join the rail war!".
- 4 January 2023: the Combat Organization of Anarcho-Communists claimed responsibility for an explosion that damaged the Trans-Siberian Railway in Krasnoyarsk. The rail line was used by the Russian Army to transport supplies to occupied Ukraine.
- 16 August 2023: Russia claimed to have "eliminated" a group of four Ukrainian saboteurs who entered Bryansk Oblast.
- 18 September, 2023: Ukrainian military intelligence claimed that a Russian An-148, an Ilyushin Il-20 and a Mil Mi-28 helicopter were damaged or destroyed in a sabotage attack at Chkalovsky Air Base near Moscow.
- 11 November 2023: A freight train was derailed in Rybnoye, Ryazan Oblast, which officials blamed on an improvised explosive device.
- 30 November 2023: Ukrainian media reported that the SBU was behind a series of explosions targeting a freight train at the Severomuysky Tunnel, Russia's longest railway tunnel, in the far eastern republic of Buryatia. Separately, Ukrainian military intelligence claimed responsibility for a series of sabotage attacks on railway infrastructure in Moscow Oblast.
- 3 January 2024: a Russian Su-34 fighter-bomber was set on fire at Chelyabinsk Shagol Airport. Ukraine's Main Directorate of Intelligence (HUR) said a Ukrainian saboteur was responsible.
- 5 January 2024: The HUR said that it had launched a cross-border raid into the Grayvoronsky District of Belgorod Oblast in Russia, mining a road and inflicting casualties on a Russian platoon.
- 4 March 2024: The HUR claimed responsibility for blowing up a railway bridge in Russia's Samara Oblast, which was used to transport military cargo.
- 7 April 2024: Ukraine's HUR said its operatives set fire to a Russian missile ship, the Buyan-class corvette Serpukhov, while it was docked in Kaliningrad Oblast. It was the first such attack on the Russian Navy in the Baltic Sea during the war.
- 26 April 2024: Ukrainian media reported that the HUR carried out an operation that destroyed a Russian Ka-32 helicopter in Ostafyevo Airport, Moscow.
- 18 July 2024: The Freedom of Russia Legion claimed to have launched a sabotage attack on Bolshoye Savino airport in Perm, which hosts MiG-31 fighters. A video showed two KAMAZ trucks burning, with the group claiming to have destroyed "several units of military equipment".
- 21 July 2024: The HUR said it carried out sabotage at the Russian Helicopters facility in Moscow, damaging three helicopters: an Mi-8, an Mi-28a, and a Ka-226.

== Assassinations ==
- 20 August 2022: ultranationalist journalist, political scientist and activist Darya Dugina was killed by a car bombing in Bolshiye Vyazyomy, Odintsovsky District, Moscow Oblast.
- 2 April 2023: Russian pro-war military blogger 'Vladlen Tatarsky' was assassinated in a bombing in St Petersburg. The bomb, hidden inside a statuette and handed to him as a gift, exploded during an event he was hosting in a café. A Russian woman was later sentenced to 27 years in prison for the attack.
- 6 May 2023: in the village of Pionerskoye, Bor District, Nizhny Novgorod Oblast, an anti-tank mine exploded under an Audi Q7 car, in which the ultranationalist writer and politician Zakhar Prilepin was driving. Prilepin received severe leg injuries, and his bodyguard died on the spot. Responsibility for the attack was claimed by Atesh, a militant group of Ukrainians and Crimean Tatars.
- 11 July 2023: Navy Captain Stanislav Rzhitsky, deputy head of military mobilization efforts in Krasnodar, was shot and killed while jogging. As commander of the submarine Krasnodar based in the Black Sea, he was accused of launching missiles that struck Vinnytsia in July 2022 and killed 23 civilians, although his father claimed he had left active service prior to the invasion in 2021.
- 16 November 2023: Oleksandr Slisarenko, the Russian-installed deputy head of the Kharkov Military-Civilian Administration, was killed in a car bombing reportedly carried out by the SBU in Belgorod.
- 6 December 2023: Ilya Kiva, a former Ukrainian member of parliament and soldier who defected to Russia and had been spreading pro-Russian propaganda was shot and killed in the village of Suponevo, close to Moscow. Ukrainian intelligence source claimed responsibility of the assassination and a spokesman for Ukraine's military intelligence said that Kiva was "done" and that "the same fate will befall all traitors of Ukraine and accomplice's of Putins regime".
- June 2024: Hennadii Matsehora, the former mayor of Kupiansk who was wanted for collaboration with Russia, was wounded in an assassination attempt in Stary Oskol, Belgorod Oblast. He died from his wounds on 11 June.
- 24 July 2024: A GRU officer reportedly in charge of satellite communication in the Russian army and who participated in the war against Ukraine was seriously injured and reportedly had his feet blown off in a car bombing which also injured his wife and damaged 5 nearby cars in Moscow.
- 16 October 2024: Nikita Klenkov, the deputy commander of the Special operations forces of the Russian armed forces, was shot to death in his car in the village of Melenka located in the Moscow region. He had came back from the war in Ukraine only a week before his assassination.
- 20 October 2024: Dmitry Golenkov, a bomber pilot and chief of staff of Shaykovka air base, was found dead in an apple orchard in Bryansk Oblast in an apparent assassination. He was accused of launching attacks on civilians in Ukraine, including the 2022 Kremenchuk shopping mall attack and the 2023 Dnipro residential building airstrike. He was killed with a hammer, with Ukraine's HUR calling it the "hammer of justice".
- December 2024: The deputy chef of design and head of software at the Moscow Experimental Bureau Mars, Mikhail Shatsky was shot dead in a forest park close to his home in Kotelniki, near Moscow. The HUR was reportedly behind the assassination. He was involved in upgrades to Russian ballistic missiles, satellites and unmanned aerial vehicles.
- 17 December 2024: Lieutenant General Igor Kirillov and his assistant were killed when a bomb exploded in an electric scooter outside a residential building in Moscow. The SBU claimed responsibility for the attack, saying that Kirillov had been charged with using banned chemical weapons against Ukrainian troops.
- 3 February 2025: Armen Sargsyan, an Armenian-born paramilitary leader and founder of the pro-Russian Arbat Battalion, was wounded by a bomb that detonated in the entrance hall of an apartment building in Moscow. He later died from his wounds.
- 18 April 2025: Yevgeny Rytikov, a Russian engineer involved in electronic warfare modernization of systems used against Ukraine was killed in a car bombing which also likley took the life of his deputy or assistant in Bryansk.
- 25 April 2025: Lieutenant General Yaroslav Moskalik was killed by an under-car bomb in Balashikha.
- 29 May 2025, Zaur Gurtsiyev, the first deputy mayor of Stavropol and a former air force officer was killed in an explosion during the night in a parking lot after being approached by an acquaintance believed by Russian investigators to have detonated an improvised explosive device killing them both. Gurtsiyev has led the air operations for Russia during the siege of Mariupol.
- 27 September 2025: A Rosgvardiya lieutenant colonel, an aide, and his driver were killed by HUR agents with a car bomb near the village of Tambukan in Stavropol Krai. The HUR claimed to have worked with a local resistance movement.
- 25 October 2025: Russian OMON commander, Lieutenant Colonel Veniamin Mazzherin, was killed by a car bomb in Kemerovo Oblast. His unit was accused of war crimes in Kyiv Oblast in 2022.
- 22 December 2025: Lieutenant General Fanil Sarvarov, head of the Operational Training Directorate of the Russian General Staff, was killed by an under-car bomb in Moscow. Two days later, a car exploded near the location of the previous assassination, killing two police officers and injuring two other as well killing one suspect. HUR intelligence sources said that the killed officers were involved in the systematic torture of Ukrainian prisoners of war and that the suspect did the attack "in protest of the Kremlin's aggressive policy".
- 6 February 2026: Lieutenant General Vladimir Alexeyev, the deputy head of the GRU, was shot and severely wounded by an unidentified gunman in Moscow.
- 28 April 2026: A lieutenant colonel was killed when a bomb exploded in a post box in an army garrison in Khabarovsk, in the Russian Far East. It is believed the target was Colonel Azatbek Omurbekov, who commanded Russian troops involved in the Bucha massacre.
- 9 June 2026: Lieutenant General Damir Davydov, head of Russia's Main Missile and Artillery Directorate, was killed by a car bomb explosion in Balashikha, Moscow Oblast.
- 29 July 2026, the executive of a sanctioned drone manufacturer company was shot three times and critically wounded in the staircase of his apartment building in Tula.
- 1 August 2026: A bomb exploded outside a restaurant in Moscow, killing five and injuring 19. The target was believed to be Russian Aerospace Forces Commander-in-Chief Aleksandr Chayko, who was celebrating his 55th birthday at the restaurant. A woman tried to enter the building with a parcel bomb but was stopped by a security guard. It exploded, killing her along with the security guard, Major-General Valery Plokhotnyuk, and two of Chayko's relatives.
- 5 August 2026, the general director and founder of a defense firm producing FPV drones for the Russian military as well as the administrator of a pro-war telegram channel was critically injured when his car exploded as he was outside of it while his driver was killed in Bolshoy Istok, Sverdlovsk Oblast.
- 13 August 2026: Robert Shagieiev, a 1st Captain in the Black Sea Fleet and one time commander of the Ukrainian submarine Zaporizhzhia, was believed to have been killed by bomb that exploded in a trash can as he walked by in Sevastopol. He was wanted for high treason for accepting the Russian occupation of Crimea and joining the Russian Navy.
- 27 August 2026: A Lieutenant Colonel was killed by an under-car bomb in St Petersburg, his wife was seriously injured. The explosion occurred near housing for military personnel.
- 3 September 2026: Major General Nikolai Varpakhovich, commander of the 22nd Guards Heavy Bomber Aviation Division, was shot and wounded by a gunman on a motorcycle near Engels-2 air base. The shooting took place days after Ukraine pressed criminal charges against Varpakhovich in absentia for allegedly ordering the deadly missile strike on Okhmatdyt children's hospital in Kyiv in July 2024.
- 12 November 2026: A colonel of the Russian Air Force was killed by a remotely-detonated bomb in the Pushkinsky district of St Petersburg. The following day, an under-car bomb in Moscow seriously wounded Sergei Zavorotniy, who was named as an officer of Russia's Foreign Intelligence Service (SVR).

== Ground incursions ==
=== March 2023: Bryansk ===
On 2 March 2023, the Russian authorities said that an armed Ukrainian group crossed the border and attacked the villages of Lyubechane and Sushany in Bryansk Oblast. Russia said the attackers fired on a car, killing two civilians, before the Federal Security Service forced them back into Ukraine. The raid was claimed by the Russian Volunteer Corps; a paramilitary group of Russian citizens, based in Ukraine, which opposes the Russian regime of Vladimir Putin. (Note: In the immediate aftermath, Ukrainian officials have said that the group is independent.) Russia called the incident a terrorist attack, and said its 9 March missile strikes on Ukraine were retaliation. Ukraine's government denied involvement; it said the incident could have been a false-flag attack by Russia to justify its ongoing war against Ukraine, or else an attack by anti-government partisans from within Russia.

=== May–July 2023: Belgorod ===
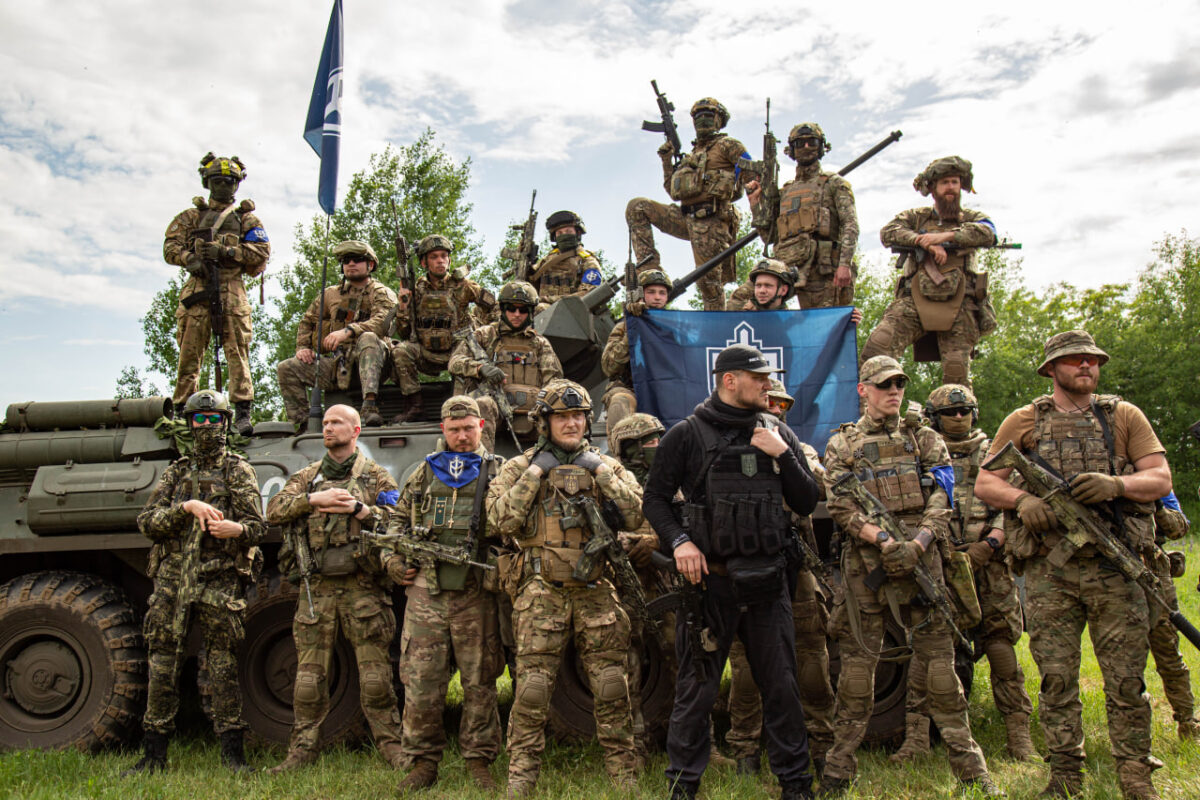
RVC members on 24 May 2023

On 22 May, another cross-border raid took place in Belgorod Oblast; in the Kozinka, Gora-Podol and Grayvoron districts. The Freedom of Russia Legion (FRL) and Russian Volunteer Corps (RVC) claimed responsibility for the attacks. A Ukrainian spokesperson, Andrii Yusov, made the same claim, stating that the attacks were to "liberate" the regions and to provide a buffer zone to protect Ukrainian civilians. Russian authorities attributed the attacks to "a Ukrainian sabotage-reconnaissance group".

On 1 June, the FRL and RVC launched another raid into Belgorod Oblast, this time near the small town of Shebekino.

=== March 2024: Belgorod and Kursk ===
On 12 March 2024, the FRL and RVC launched raids into Kursk and Belgorod Oblasts, claiming control of Tyotkino and Lozovaya Rudka.

=== August 2024 – March 2025: Belgorod and Kursk ===
On 6 August 2024, during the Russo-Ukrainian war, the Armed Forces of Ukraine launched an incursion into Russia's Kursk Oblast and clashed with the Russian Armed Forces and Russian border guard. A state of emergency was declared in Kursk Oblast, and Russian reserves were rushed to the area. By the end of the first week, the Ukrainian military said it had captured 1,000 km^{2} (390 sq mi) of Russian territory, while Russian authorities acknowledged that Ukraine had captured 28 settlements.

Starting on 18 March 2025, Ukrainian forces launched an incursion into Belgorod Oblast, near the towns of Demidovka, Grafovka and Prilesye.

== Reactions ==
=== Russia ===
In response to alleged shelling by Ukraine, Russia reportedly began reinforcing its border with Ukraine in November 2022, including building defense lines and fortifications along the border in Belgorod, Kursk and Bryansk regions. A state of emergency was also declared in some villages and settlements along the border with Ukraine following repeated shelling attacks.

ISW reported in November 2022 that Russian forces could be preparing a large-scale false flag attack to gather popular support for the invasion, with Kremlin propagandists claiming that Ukraine is "preparing to invade" Belgorod Oblast. A senior Ukrainian officer later said that Russia may attempt to escalate the situation on the border and claim "NATO and Ukrainian aggression". He cited fake news being spread in pro-Russian Telegram channels about "Ukrainian and NATO plans" to "attack peaceful Russian and Belarusian territory".

In May 2023, Russia's Security Council Secretary Nikolai Patrushev accused Ukraine's NATO allies of involvement in Ukrainian attacks in Russia, saying "the terrorist attacks committed in Russia are accompanied by an information campaign prepared in advance in Washington and London, designed to destabilise the socio-political situation, and to undermine the constitutional foundations and sovereignty of Russia."

After a Ukrainian HIMARS strike destroyed a convoy of Russian troops in Kursk Oblast in Russia on the night of 8–9 August 2024, Russian milbloggers responded with outrage. Many of them called for the commanders who authorized the movement of the column to be punished. The Ukrainian attack on the convoy was described by Russian milbloggers as one of the bloodiest of the entire war.

Russian President Vladimir Putin threatened retaliation for attacks on Russian territory. He alleged that Western-supplied "long-range precision weapons cannot be used without space-based reconnaissance" and "highly skilled specialists" from NATO countries. Experts said Putin's threats are aimed at dissuading the United States, the United Kingdom and France from allowing Ukraine to use Western-supplied long-range missiles such as the ATACMS and Storm Shadow in strikes against Russia.

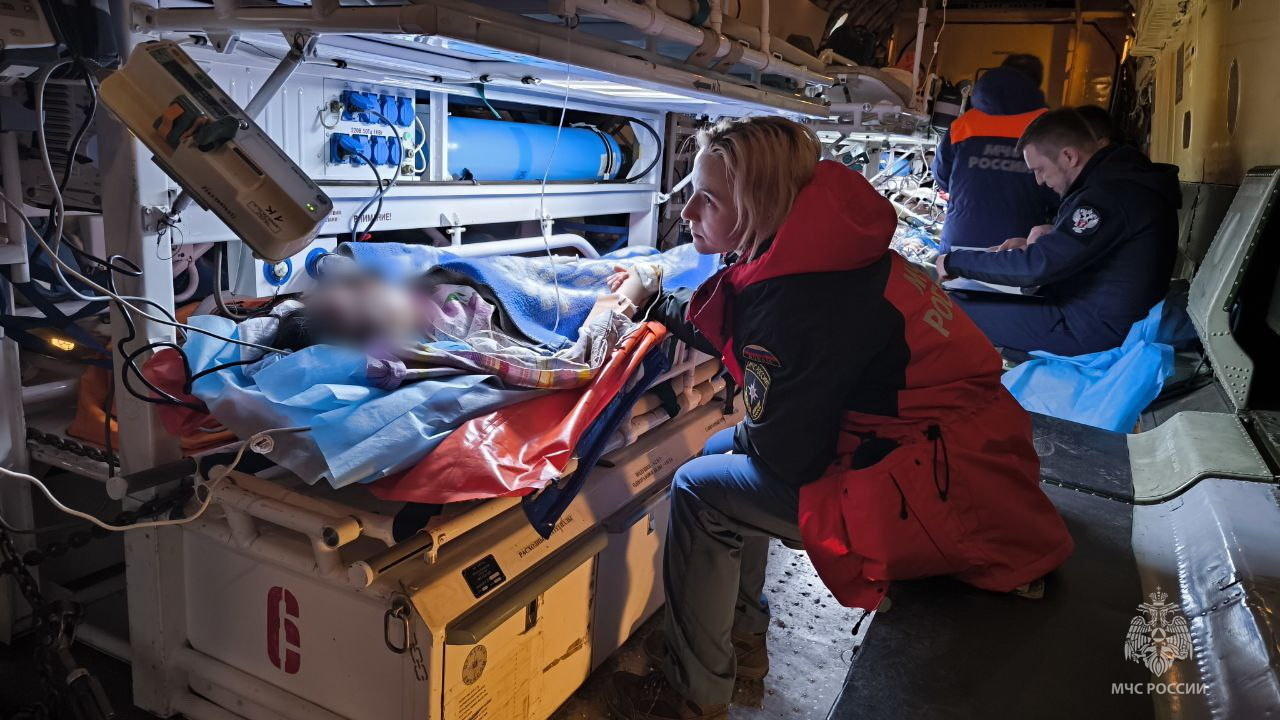
Transportation of Russian citizens injured in the crash of flight 8243 to Moscow

In December 2024, Vladimir Putin threatened to bring more "destruction" to Ukraine in retaliation for a Ukrainian drone attack on the central Russian city of Kazan in the Republic of Tatarstan.

On 25 December 2024, the Azerbaijan Airlines Flight 8243 crashed near Aktau International Airport, Kazakhstan, with 62 passengers and 5 crew on board. Osprey Flight Solutions, a United Kingdom-based aviation security firm which provides analysis for airlines still flying into Russia, warned its clients that the aircraft had likely been shot down by a Russian military air-defence system. On the morning of 25 December, the head of the Security Council of the Chechen Republic, Khamzat Kadyrov, confirmed that Grozny had been attacked by drones. On 26 December, Azerbaijani government sources confirmed that a Russian surface-to-air missile, a Pantsir-S1, had fired at the aircraft above Grozny, detonating near the plane, injuring passengers and crew members. Despite the pilots' requests to perform an emergency landing, they were denied to do so at any Russian airport, instead being ordered to fly towards Aktau.

In response to the 18 June 2026 drone strikes on Moscow, the Russian government said that it will carry out a "massive retaliation" against Ukraine with Russian foreign minister Sergey Lavrov saying the Russian Armed Forces will from now on, carry out "massive group strikes" on a "regular basis" following the attack on Moscow.

=== Ukraine ===
Ukrainian officials have rarely commented on the attacks. The Ukrainian military and intelligence services have acknowledged carrying out some of them, or have welcomed attacks without admitting involvement.

In April 2022, Mykhailo Podolyak, adviser to President Volodymyr Zelenskyy, referred to attacks in Russia as "karma" or payback for the Russian invasion. He said that Russian regions where fuel and weapons are stored were learning about "demilitarization", referring to one of Putin's stated goals of the invasion.

Ukraine's military denied taking part in the cross-border raids by the Freedom of Russia Legion and Russian Volunteer Corps. Andriy Yusov, a spokesperson for Ukraine's military intelligence, said that Russian citizens had launched the operations to liberate territories from the "Putin regime", to push Russian government forces away from the border and create a "security zone to protect the Ukrainian civilian population". Some Ukrainian commentators wryly compared them to Russia's past use of proxy forces in Ukraine. Mykhailo Podolyak said "As you know, tanks are sold at any Russian military store", referencing Putin's claim that Russian troops and proxy forces in 2014 were locals who bought their equipment at army surplus stores. Ukrainian social media accounts jokingly called the Belgorod region the "Bilhorod People's Republic", in reference to the Russian-occupied Donetsk and Luhansk People's Republics. Another popular joke online referred to Putin announcing "another Special Military Operation to defend Russian-speaking Russians from Russians invading Russia".

In response to Ukraine's 2024 cross-border offensive in Kursk, President Zelenskyy said that "Russia brought the war to our land and should feel what it has done". He said: "Everything that inflicts losses on the Russian army, Russian state, their military-industrial complex, and their economy helps prevent the war from expanding and brings us closer to a just end to this aggression". Zelenskyy maintained that "Russia must be forced to make peace", adding that Ukrainian troops were helping to protect Ukraine by capturing areas from where Russia had launched numerous strikes. Ukrainian foreign ministry spokesman Georgiy Tykhy said that "unlike Russia", Ukraine is not interested in taking the territory of its neighbor. Tykhy continued: "The sooner Russia agrees to restore a just peace ... the sooner the raids by the Ukrainian defense forces into Russia will stop".

=== NATO ===
For more than two years, NATO states that supplied Ukraine with weapons, barred Ukraine from using those weapons to strike inside Russia. US Secretary of State Antony Blinken said "We haven't encouraged or enabled strikes outside of Ukraine". However, in May 2024, NATO Secretary-General Jens Stoltenberg and several European leaders said Ukraine should be allowed to use Western-supplied weapons to strike military targets inside Russia in self-defense. Stoltenberg said that "if [Ukraine] cannot attack the Russian forces on the other side of the frontline because they are on the other side of the border, then of course you really reduce the ability of the Ukrainian forces to defend". French President Emmanuel Macron said that Ukraine must be able to take out the bases across the border from where Russian missiles are fired, while German Chancellor Olaf Scholz said Ukraine's defense "isn't limited to its territory". Italian Prime Minister Giorgia Meloni said she did not think it necessary to hit Russian military bases, and urged Western allies to supply Ukraine with more air defenses instead. Italian Defense Minister Guido Crosetto said it is "wrong to increase tension" in an already "dramatic" situation and underlined the need to leave open the possibility of "peace talks in the coming months". Hungary's Foreign Minister Peter Szijjarto said it was a "crazy idea because, as we've seen so far, the Russians will fire back".

On 30 May 2024, in response to Russia's 2024 Kharkiv offensive, US President Joe Biden gave Ukraine permission to strike the Russian military inside Russia with US-supplied weapons, but only to defend the Kharkiv region from "Russian forces hitting them or preparing to hit them". The same permission was given to Ukraine by Germany, France and the United Kingdom. Dutch Foreign Minister Hanke Bruins Slot said that the Netherlands would not object if Ukraine used Dutch-supplied F-16 fighters to strike military targets inside Russia.

The US Biden administration reportedly told Ukraine to stop attacking oil refineries in Russia, believing it would raise world energy prices and bring more aggressive Russian retaliation. Ukraine's government rejected the request. The US also expressed concern at a Ukrainian drone strike against a Russian nuclear early-warning radar, believing that it could dangerously unsettle the Russian government.

In July 2024, British Prime Minister Keir Starmer announced that the British government would authorize the use of Storm Shadow long-range missiles against military targets in Russia.

On 17 November 2024, the Biden administration authorized the use of long-range ATACMS missiles for military targets inside mainland Russia.

== See also ==
- Shelling of Donetsk, Rostov Oblast
- Crimea attacks (2022–present)
- Rail war in Belarus (2022–present)
- Russian mystery fires
- Hybrid warfare
