= Chimera Unit =

Ukrainian military volunteer unit

Himera Unit
- Химера Підрозділ
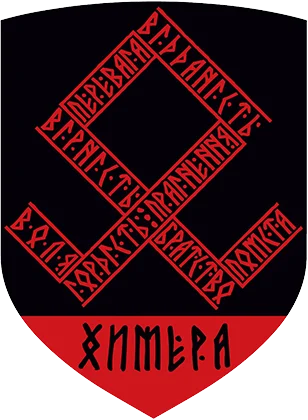
- Himera insignia
- Founded: February 2022
- Country: Ukraine
- Branch: Main Directorate of Intelligence
- Type: Spetsnaz
- Role: Reconnaissance, counteroffensive and sabotage
- Part of: 126th Territorial Defense Battalion (2022–2023); Tymur Special Operations Detachment (2023-)
- Engagements: Russo-Ukrainian War; Russian invasion of Ukraine; Eastern Ukraine campaign; 2024 Kharkiv offensive; Battle of Vovchansk; Southern Ukraine campaign; Battle of Mykolaiv; 2022 Kherson counteroffensive; Dnieper campaign; Western Russia campaign; 2024 Kursk offensive
- Website: http://himera.army/

Commanders
- Current commander: Oleksandr "Kappa" Kapshyn

The Special Forces "Himera" Unit is a Ukrainian military unit, part of the spetsnaz units of the Main Directorate of Intelligence of Ukraine formed in 2022 as a response to the Russian invasion of Ukraine, originally as a part of the 126th Territorial Defense Brigade later being transferred to Main Directorate of Intelligence (Ukraine). The logo of the unit is a *Ōþala rune.

== History ==
It was established in 2022 as part of the 246th Territorial Defense Battalion of the 126th Territorial Defense Brigade. It took part in the Battle of Mykolaiv and the 2022 Kherson counteroffensive. On 29 August 2022, a soldier of the unit was killed in combat during the 2022 Kherson counteroffensive. Five ISR drones and trucks have been crowd funded and donated to the unit. On 7 April 2024, the Himera unit struck a BM-27 Uragan being transported in Voznesenovka, Belgorod Oblast, it was the first BM-27 MLRS to be struck in history. In August 2024, a part of it was operating in combat on a number of islands, conducting landings and operations under hostile conditions and a part of it was taking part in the 2024 Kharkiv offensive defending the village of Tykhe in coordination with the 57th Separate Motorized Infantry Brigade. On 9 August 2024, the unit in coordination with other units of HUR raided the Kinburn spit destroying six pieces of equipment and killed thirty Russian soldiers. In November 2024, it's UAVs struck Russian equipment near Vremivka and helped to repel a Russian assault. In Early February 2025, it took part in combat against North Korean soldiers in Kursk Oblast. On 19 February 2025, it released a video showcasing five successful FPV strikes during the Kursk offensive. On 23 February 2025, it released a video showing the destruction of Russian military positions and fortifications in southern Ukraine and inflicted casualties.

== Commanders ==
- Oleksandr "Kappa" Kapshyn (2022-)

== Structure ==
- Management and Headquarters
- Commandant Platoon
- Special forces squad
- UAV
