= Jump (service) =

Cloud gaming service

- Company type: Subsidiary
- Industry: Micromobility
- Founded: 2010 (as Social Bicycles Inc.)
- Founder: Ryan Rzepecki
- Defunct: Acquired by Uber (2018); Transferred to Lime (2020)
- Headquarters: New York City, New York, U.S.
- Area served: Worldwide (notably North America and Europe)
- Products: Electric bicycles; Electric scooters
- Parent: Lime (since 2020)
- Website: www.li.me/en-us/vehicles/ebike

Jump was a cloud gaming service for indie developers founded by CEO Anthony Palma with early team members Russ Mester, Cade Peterson, and Sam Hain. The service launched September 19, 2017 with 63 games, after a successful closed beta running during the month of July before. Striving to be a 'Netflix for Indie Games', Jump offered a subscription-based model that provided access to a catalog of games by independent developers with little to no brand-name recognition, offering 70% of revenues to game developers. Jump offered indie games such as The End is Nigh and Ittle Dew. As of February 2019, Jump offered 120 games.

On February 14, 2020, CEO Anthony Palma announced that Jump had officially shut down.
