= Mokraya Orlovka =

Mokraya Orlovka Мокрая Орловка
- Selo
- Location within Belgorod Oblast Location within Russia
- Coordinates: 50°31′N 35°31′E
- Country: Russia
- Region: Belgorod Oblast
- District: Grayvoronsky District
- Time zone: UTC+3:00

Mokraya Orlovka (Russian: Мокрая Орловка) is a rural locality (a selo) and the administrative center of Mokroorlovskoye Rural Settlement, Grayvoronsky District, Belgorod Oblast, Russia. The population was 552 as of 2010. There are 3 streets.

== Geography ==
Mokraya Orlovka is located 15 km northwest of Grayvoron (the district's administrative centre) by road. Spodaryushino is the nearest rural locality.

== History ==
=== Russo-Ukrainian War ===
Raids by Ukrainian forces were reported in August 2024.
