= 2024 Belgorod missile strike =

The 2024 Belgorod missile strike may refer to:

- February 2024 Belgorod missile strike
- May 2024 Belgorod missile strike
