= Dobroivanovka =

Dobroivanovka Доброивановка
- Selo
- Location within Belgorod Oblast Location within Russia
- Coordinates: 50°31′N 35°43′E
- Country: Russia
- Region: Belgorod Oblast
- District: Grayvoronsky District
- Time zone: UTC+3:00

Dobroivanovka (Russian: Доброивановка) is a rural locality (a selo) and the administrative center of Dobroivanovskoye Rural Settlement, Grayvoronsky District, Belgorod Oblast, Russia. The population was 136 as of 2010. There are 8 streets.

== Geography ==
Dobroivanovka is located 8 km northeast of Grayvoron (the district's administrative centre) by road. Dobroye is the nearest rural locality.
