= Kozachok, Russia =

Kozachok Казачок
- Hamlet
- Location within Belgorod Oblast Location within Russia
- Coordinates: 50°27′46″N 35°50′50″E
- Country: Russia
- Federal subject: Belgorod Oblast
- District: Grayvoronsky District
- Time zone: UTC+3:00

Kozachok (Russian: Казачок) is a rural locality (a hamlet) in the Grayvoronsky district of the Belgorod Oblast in Russia. In 2010 its population was 22.
