= Bezymeno =

Bezymeno Безымено
- Selo
- Interactive map of Bezymeno
- Coordinates: 50°23′24″N 35°42′03″E
- Country: Russia
- Federal subject: Belgorod Oblast

Population
  - Estimate (2018): 805 )
- Time zone: UTC+3 (MSK)
- Postal code: 309381
- OKTMO ID: 14632412101

Bezymeno (Russian: Безымено) is a rural locality (a selo) in Grayvoronsky District, Belgorod Oblast, Russia. The population was 841 as of 2010. There are 2 streets.

== Geography ==
Bezymeno is located 14 km south of Grayvoron (the district's administrative centre) by road. Glotovo is the nearest rural locality.
