= Golovchino =

Golovchino Головчино
- Rural locality
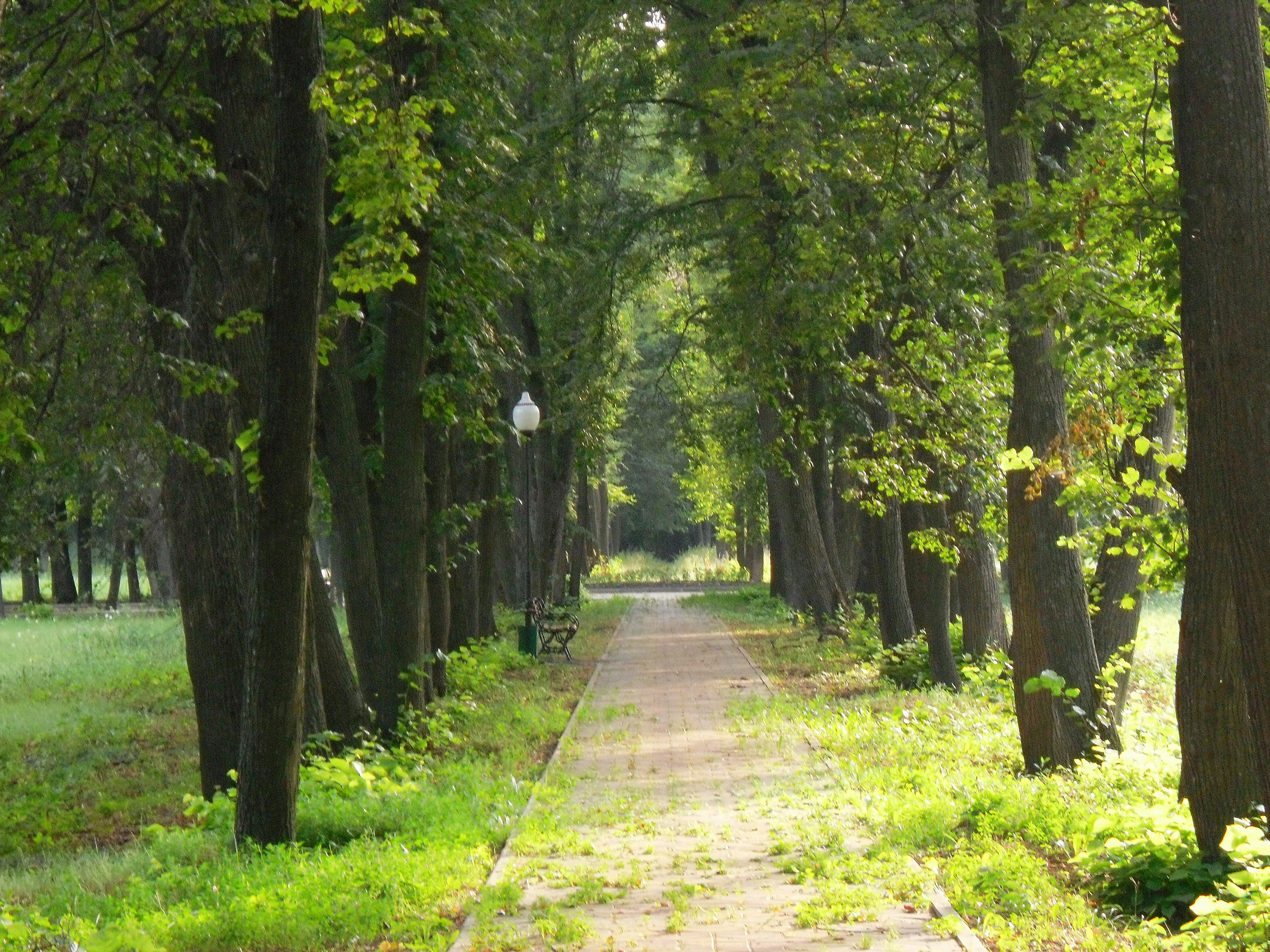
- The park in Golovchino
- Interactive map of Golovchino
- Location of Golovchino
- Coordinates: 50°32′N 35°48′E
- Country: Russia
- Federal subject: Belgorod Oblast

Population (2010 Census)
  - Total: 4,716
  - Estimate (2021): 4,621 (−2%)
- Time zone: UTC+3 (MSK)
- Postal code: 309377
- OKTMO ID: 14632424101

Golovchino (Russian: Головчино) is a rural locality (a selo) in Grayvoronsky District of Belgorod Oblast, Russia, located on the banks the Vorskla River (the left tributary of the Dnieper River). Population: 4,716 (2010 census); 5,288 (2002 census). The name of the village, Golovchino, is associated with count Gavrila Ivanovich Golovkin (1660-1734), a prominent member of the government of Peter the Great. In 2023 an administrative building caught on fire; officials blamed a quadcopter.

== Geography ==
Golovchino is located at the confluence of the Lozovaya River and the Vorskla River, making it 11 kilometers Northeast of Grayvoron, the administrative center of the Grayvoronsky District, and 55 kilometers west of Belgorod.

Khotmyzhsk Station, a station of South-Eastern railway of Russian Railways, is located within Golovchino. The Belgorod-Okhtyrka highway passes through Goliovchino.
