= Rozhdestvenka, Belgorod Oblast =

Village in Belgorod Oblast, Russia

Rozhdestvenka Рождественка
- Village
- Location of Rozhdestvenka within Russia Rozhdestvenka (Russia)
- Coordinates: 50.534141°N 35.51609°E
- Country: Russia
- Oblast: Belgorod Oblast
- Raion: Grayvoronsky District
- Elevation: 128 m (420 ft)

Population (2010)
  - Total: 158
  - Summer (DST): UTC+3
- Postal code: 309392

Rozhdestvenka (Russian: Рождественка) is a village in Grayvoronsky District (district) in Belgorod Oblast of western Russia, a few kilometres east of the Ukrainian border.
