= Berezovka, Borisovsky District, Belgorod Oblast =

Berezovka Берёзовка
- Selo
- Location within Belgorod Oblast Location within Russia
- Coordinates: 50°32′N 35°53′E
- Country: Russia
- Region: Belgorod Oblast
- District: Borisovsky District
- Time zone: UTC+3:00

Berezovka (Russian: Берёзовка) is a rural locality (a selo) and the administrative center of Berezovsky Rural Settlement, Borisovsky District, Belgorod Oblast, Russia. The population was 1,281 as of 2010. There are 12 streets.

== Geography ==
Berezovka is located 14 km southwest of Borisovka (the district's administrative centre) by road. Krasivo is the nearest rural locality.
