= Spodaryushino =

Spodaryushino Сподарюшино
- Village
- Location within Belgorod Oblast Location within Russia
- Coordinates: 50°30′30″N 35°29′05″E
- Country: Russia
- Region: Belgorod Oblast
- District: Grayvoronsky District
- Time zone: UTC+3:00

Spodaryushino (Russian: Сподарюшино) is a rural locality (a village) in Mokroorlovskoye Selsoviet of Grayvoronsky District, in Belgorod Oblast, Russia. Population: 96 (2010 census); 141 (2002 census);
