= Novye Yurkovichi =

Novye Yurkovichi Новые Юрковичи
- Selo
- Location of Novye Yurkovichi
- Location of Novye Yurkovichi Novye Yurkovichi (Bryansk Oblast)
- Coordinates: 52°06′57″N 31°51′40″E
- Country: Russia
- Federal subject: Bryansk Oblast
- Rural Settlement: Yurkovichskoye Rural Settlement

Municipal status
  - Municipal district: Klimovsky District
- Time zone: UTC+3 (MSK)
- Postal code(s): 243046
- Dialing code(s): +7 48347
- OKTMO ID: 15628456101

Novye Yurkovichi (Russian: Новые Юрковичи) is a rural locality (a selo) in Klimovsky District, Bryansk Oblast, Russia. It is the administrative center of Yurkovichskoye Rural Settlement (Russian: сельское поселение Новоюрковичское). The town was hit by Ukrainian artillery in July 2022 in the ongoing Russian invasion of Ukraine.
