= Solokhi =

Solokhi Солохи
- Selo
- Location within Belgorod Oblast Location within Russia
- Coordinates: 50°32′N 36°09′E
- Country: Russia
- Region: Belgorod Oblast
- District: Belgorodsky District
- Time zone: UTC+3:00

Solokhi (Russian: Солохи) is a rural locality (a selo) in Belgorodsky District, Belgorod Oblast, Russia. The population was 638 as of 2010. There are 5 streets.

== Geography ==
Solokhi is located 27 km west of Maysky (the district's administrative centre) by road. Novoalexandrovka is the nearest rural locality.
