= Popovka, Belgorod Oblast =

Popovka Поповка
- Selo
- Location within Belgorod Oblast Location within Russia
- Coordinates: 50°52′N 37°11′E
- Country: Russia
- Region: Belgorod Oblast
- District: Korochansky District
- Time zone: UTC+3:00

Popovka (Russian: Поповка) is a rural locality (a selo) and the administrative center of Popovskoye Rural Settlement, Korochansky District, Belgorod Oblast, Russia. The population was 1,300 as of 2010. There are 10 streets.

== Geography ==
Popovka is located 11 km north of Korocha (the district's administrative centre) by road. Krucheny is the nearest rural locality.
