= May 2024 Belgorod bombing =

Attack during the Russo-Ukrainian War

- Part of Attacks in Russia during the Russian invasion of Ukraine
- Location: Belgorod, Belgorod Oblast, Russia
- Date: 12 May 2024; 11:30
- Attack type: Airstrike
- Deaths: 19
- Injuries: 30

The May 2024 Belgorod bombing occurred on 12 May 2024. At least 19 civilians were killed. Another 30 others were injured in a strike on an apartment block in Belgorod, Russia.

== Events ==
As a result of the explosion, the entrance to a ten-story residential building was destroyed, 17 people were killed, and about 30 more people were injured. The collapse of the entrance occurred against the backdrop of Russia's invasion of Ukraine.

The Russian Ministry of Defense stated that the explosion that led to the collapse of the house was caused by the fall of a fragment of a Ukrainian Tochka-U missile shot down by Russian air defences. Independent military experts considered this version unlikely, noting that the building was hit on its northeastern side, which is not facing Ukrainian territory. They said that the origin of the explosion was probably a Russian surface-to-air missile, or a Russian guided aerial bomb dropped accidentally.

== See also ==
- 30 December 2023 Belgorod shelling
- February 2024 Belgorod missile strike
