= Morozovsk Air Base =

Military airfield in Rostov Oblast, Russia

Morozovsk
- Morozovsk, Morozovsky District, Rostov Oblast in Russia
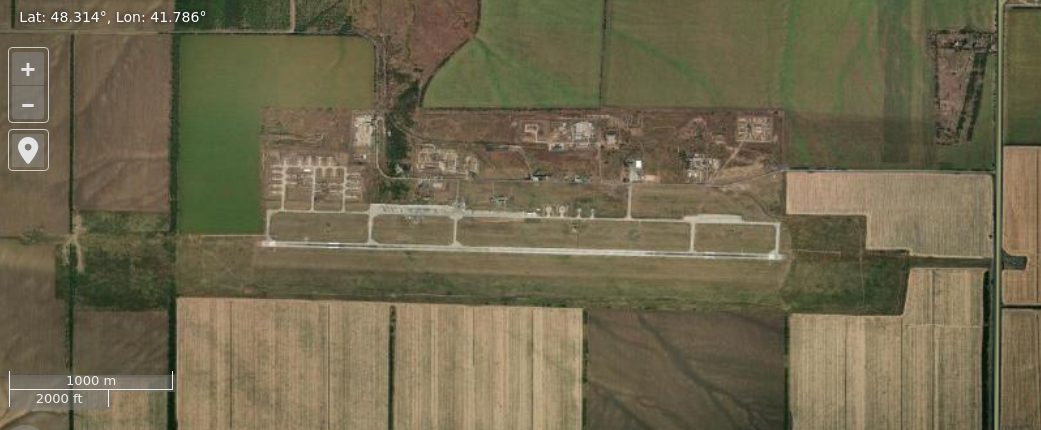
- Satellite imagery of Morozovsk air base

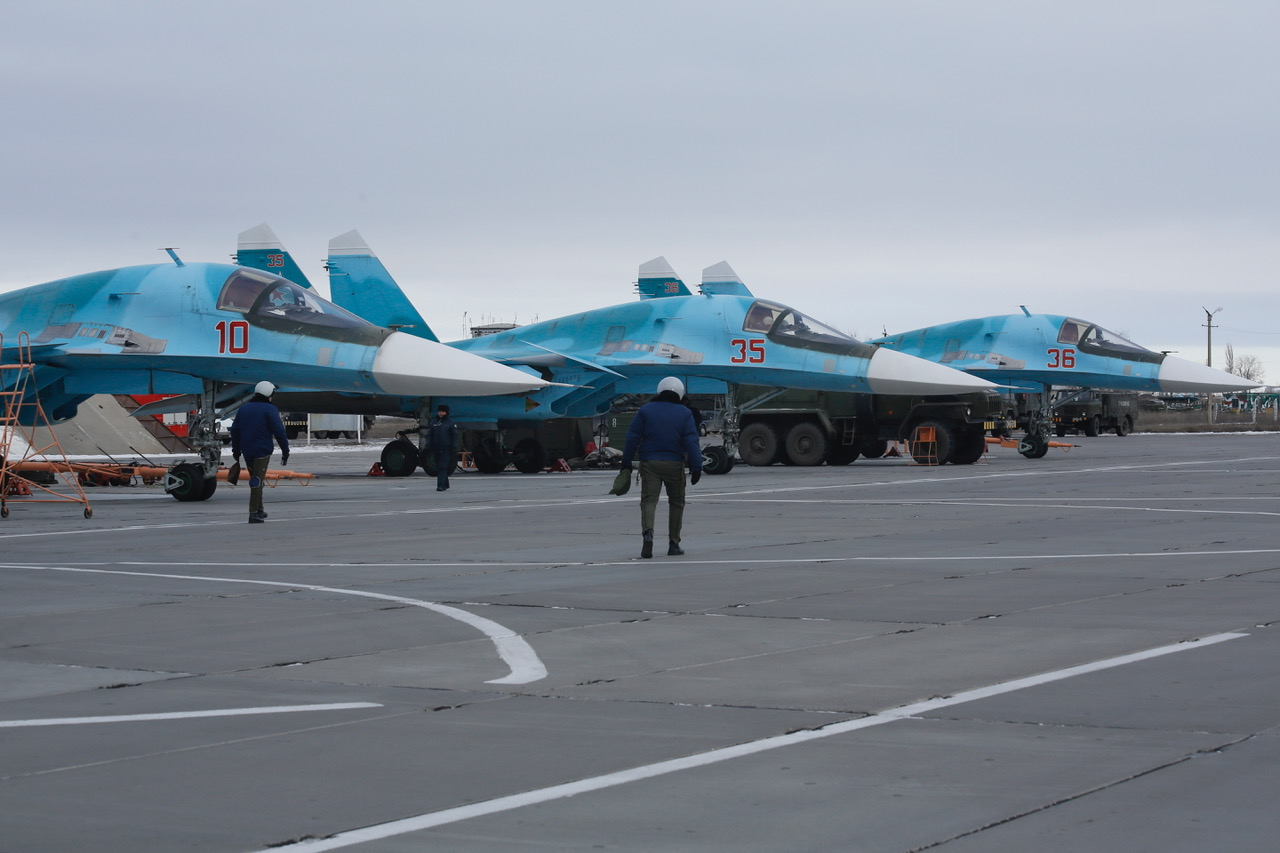
- Sukhoi Su-34 at Morozovsk air base (2018)

Site information
- Owner: Ministry of Defence
- Operator: Russian Aerospace Forces
- Controlled by: 4th Air and Air Defence Forces Army

Location
- Shown within Rostov Oblast, Russia Morozovsk (Russia)
- Coordinates: 48°18′52″N 41°47′10″E

Site history
- In use: Before 1940 - Present
- Battles/wars: World War II; Russian invasion of Ukraine

Airfield information
- Elevation: 116 metres (381 ft) AMSL
Runways
Direction	Length and surface
09/27	2,472 metres (8,110 ft) Concrete

Morozovsk is an air base of the Russian Aerospace Forces as part of the 4th Air and Air Defence Forces Army, Southern Military District.

The base is home to the 559th Bomber Aviation Regiment which had three squadrons of Sukhoi Su-34 (NATO: Fullback) as part of the 1st Guards Composite Aviation Division as of 2022.

== History ==
The regiment arrived from Finsterwalde in Germany in 1993, still as the 559th Fighter-Bomber Aviation Regiment.

The 559th was forward deployed during part of 2022 to Primorsko-Akhtarsk air base as part of the 2022 Russian invasion of Ukraine.

On 5 April 2024 Ukraine launched 53 drones into western Russia. Ukrainian intelligence officials claimed that at least six aircraft were destroyed, eight "heavily damaged" and 20 personnel killed at the Morozovsk airbase. Open source intelligence showed 26 Su-34s and three Su-35s at the base prior to the attack. Russian sources claimed that all drones and attacks were thwarted. ISW found no visual evidence of Russian aircraft being hit at the airbase.

During the night of 13–14 June 2024, Ukrainian HUR officials claimed that two Su-34s were damaged during a Ukrainian drone strike on the air base. Reports of casualties were not officially confirmed. Satellite photos appeared to show fuel leakage.

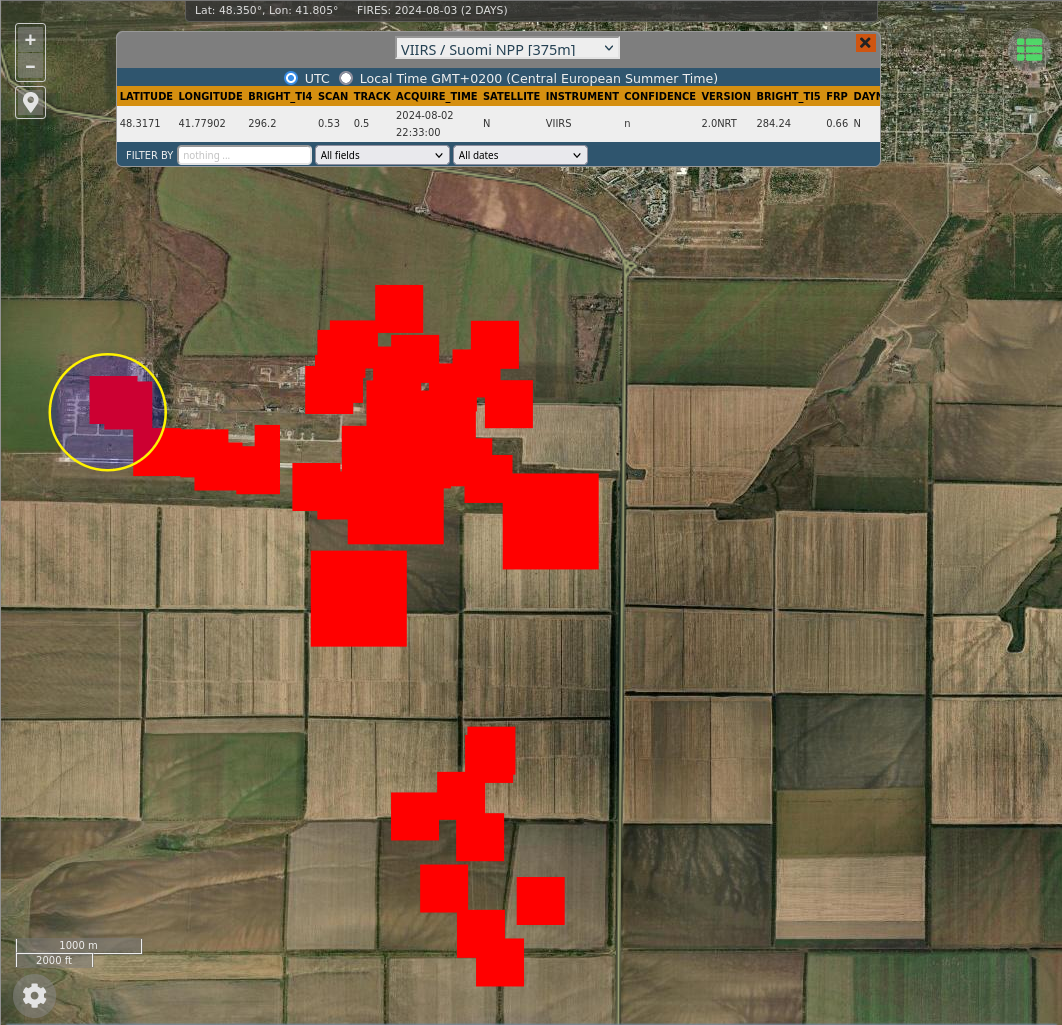
NASA's FIRMS detected multiple fires on and near Morozovsk air base from 2 August 2024 22:33:00 (UTC) and until the next day

During the night of 2–3 August 2024, a major drone attack was made on the airbase with multiple large explosions reported by local Russian citizen journalists, including many secondary explosions of rocket and bomb material. Ukrainian military says the drones also hit an ammunition depot where a large number of glide bombs and rockets were stored. The fires were detected by NASA's FIRMS.

== See also ==
- List of military airbases in Russia
