= Pervoye Tseplyayevo =

Pervoye Tseplyayevo Первое Цепляево
- Selo
- Location within Belgorod Oblast Location within Russia
- Coordinates: 50°29′N 37°15′E
- Country: Russia
- Region: Belgorod Oblast
- District: Shebekinsky District
- Time zone: UTC+3:00

Pervoye Tseplyayevo (Russian: Первое Цепляево) is a rural locality (a selo) and the administrative center of Pervotseplyayevskoye Rural Settlement, Shebekinsky District, Belgorod Oblast, Russia. The population was 758 as of 2010. There are 3 streets.

== Geography ==
Pervoye Tseplyayevo is located 36 km northeast of Shebekino (the district's administrative centre) by road. Surkovo is the nearest rural locality.
