= Urazovo =

Urban locality in Belgorod Oblast, Russia

Urazovo Уразово
- Urban-type settlement
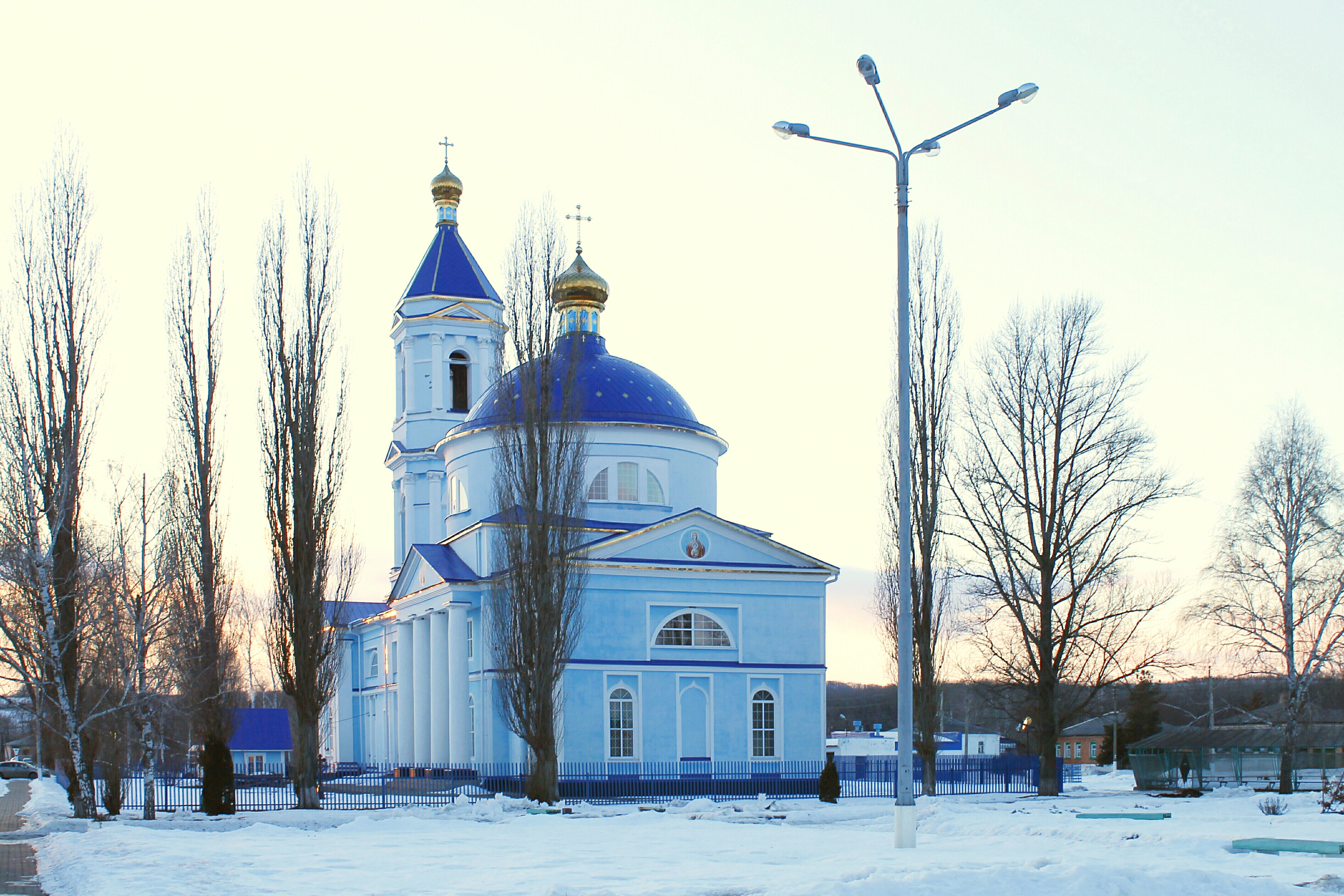
- Church of the Icon of the Mother of God "The Sign"
- Interactive map of Urazovo
- Location of Urazovo Urazovo (European Russia) Urazovo (Russia)
- Coordinates: 50°04′56″N 38°02′18″E
- Country: Russia
- Federal subject: Belgorod Oblast
- Administrative district: Valuysky District
- Founded: 1728
- Elevation: 73 m (240 ft)

Population
  - Estimate (1 January 2023): 6,419 )
- Time zone: UTC+3 (MSK)
- Postal code: 309970
- OKTMO ID: 14620160051

Urazovo (Russian: Ура́зово) is an urban-type settlement in Valuysky District of Belgorod Oblast, Russia. Population: 6,570 (2021 census); 6,982 (2010 census); 6,878 (2002 census); 6,345 (1989 Soviet census).
