= Zhuravlyovka, Belgorod Oblast =

Zhuravlyovka Журавлёвка
- Selo
- Interactive map of Zhuravlyovka
- Coordinates: 50°18′N 36°19′E
- Country: Russia
- Federal subject: Belgorod Oblast
- Founded: 1640

Population (2010 Census)
  - Total: 1,193
  - Estimate (2002): 1,078 (−9.6%)

Administrative status
  - Capital of: Zhuravlyovskoye Rural Settlement
- Time zone: UTC+3 (MSK)
- Postal codes: 308659, 308594
- OKTMO ID: 14610432101

Zhuravlyovka (Russian: Журавлёвка) is a rural locality (a selo) and the administrative center of Zhuravlyovskoye Rural Settlement, Belgorodsky District, Belgorod Oblast, Russia. The population was 1,193 as of 2010. There are 22 streets.

== Geography ==
Zhuravlyovka is located 29 km southwest of Maysky (the district's administrative centre) by road. Nekhoteyevka is the nearest rural locality.

== History ==
Zhuravlyovka was reported to be the scene of fighting during the March 2024 western Russia incursion. On 17 October 2024, Russian milbloggers claimed that Ukrainian forces crossed the border and raided the village in an effort to threaten Russian supply lines. The governor of Belgorod Oblast Vyacheslav Gladkov denied that the village was under Ukrainian control, but claimed the area of the village had been the target of cross-border raids since February 22, 2022.
