= Gorodishche, Kursky District, Kursk Oblast =

Rural locality in Kursk Oblast, Russia

Gorodishche Городище
- Village
- Interactive map of Gorodishche
- Location of Gorodishche Gorodishche (Kursk Oblast)
- Coordinates: 51°43′50″N 36°30′44″E
- Country: Russia
- Federal subject: Kursk Oblast
- Administrative district: Kursky District
- SelsovietSelsoviet: Besedinsky

Population (2010 Census)
  - Total: 44
  - Estimate (2010): 44 (0%)

Municipal status
  - Municipal district: Kursky Municipal District
  - Rural settlement: Besedinsky Selsoviet Rural Settlement
- Time zone: UTC+3 (MSK)
- Postal code: 305501
- Dialing code: +7 4712
- OKTMO ID: 38620408131
- Website: besedino.rkursk.ru

Gorodishche (Russian: Городище) is a rural locality (Russian: деревня, lit. 'village') in Besedinsky Selsoviet Rural Settlement, Kursky District, Kursk Oblast, Russia. Population: 44 (2010 census); 63 (2002 census);

== Geography ==
The village is located on the Rat River (a right tributary of the Seym), 108 km from the Russia–Ukraine border, 16 km east of the district center – the town Kursk, 3 km from the selsoviet center – Besedino.

Climate

Gorodishche has a warm-summer humid continental climate (Dfb in the Köppen climate classification).

== Transport ==
Gorodishche is located 3 km from the federal route P-298 (Kursk – Voronezh – P-22 "Kaspy" Highway; a part of the European route E38), 3 km from the road of intermunicipal significance 38H-530 (Otreshkovo – Petrovskoye – Besedino), 7 km from the nearest railway station Otreshkovo (railway line Kursk – 146 km).

The rural locality is situated 16 km from Kursk Vostochny Airport, 119 km from Belgorod International Airport and 188 km from Voronezh Peter the Great Airport.
