= Nekhoteyevka =

Village in Belgorod Oblast, Russia

Nekhoteyevka Нехотеевка
- Khutor
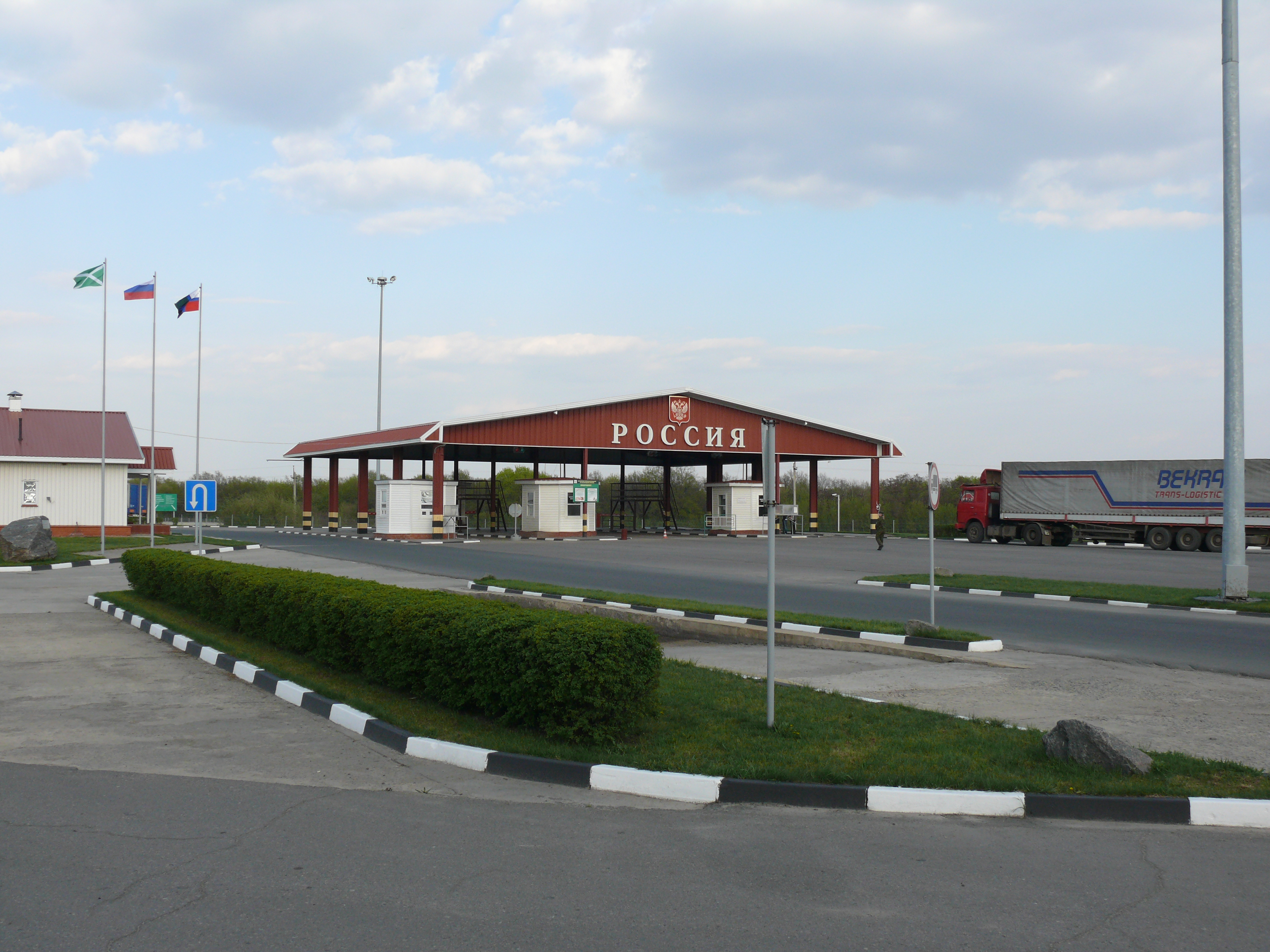
- Border crossing at Nekhoteyevka
- Interactive map of Nekhoteyevka
- Location of Nekhoteyevka Nekhoteyevka (European Russia) Nekhoteyevka (Russia)
- Coordinates: 50°20′N 36°17′E
- Country: Russia
- Federal subject: Belgorod Oblast

Population
  - Estimate (2002): 129 )
- Time zone: UTC+3 (MSK)
- Postal code: 308594
- OKTMO ID: 14610432106

Nekhoteyevka (Russian: Нехотеевка) is a rural locality (a khutor) in Belgorodsky District, Belgorod Oblast, Russia. The population was 145 as of 2010. There are 3 streets.

== Geography ==
Nekhoteyevka is located 24 km southwest of Maysky (the district's administrative centre) by road. Zhuravlyovka is the nearest rural locality.
