= Electric scooter =

Electric scooter may refer to:

- Electric motorcycles and scooters
- Mobility scooter
- E-scooter (kick scooter)
