= Voznesenovka, Shebekinsky District, Belgorod Oblast =

Voznesenovka Вознесеновка
- Selo
- Location within Belgorod Oblast Location within Russia
- Coordinates: 50°25′N 37°01′E
- Country: Russia
- Region: Belgorod Oblast
- District: Shebekinsky District
- Time zone: UTC+3:00

Voznesenovka (Russian: Вознесеновка) is a rural locality (a selo) and the administrative center of Voznesenovskoye Rural Settlement, Shebekinsky District, Belgorod Oblast, Russia. The population was 1,466 as of 2010. There are 20 streets.

== Geography ==
Voznesenovka is located 15 km east of Shebekino (the district's administrative centre) by road. Nezhegol is the nearest rural locality.
