= Grayvoronsky District =

Grayvoronsky District Грайворонский район (Russian)
- District
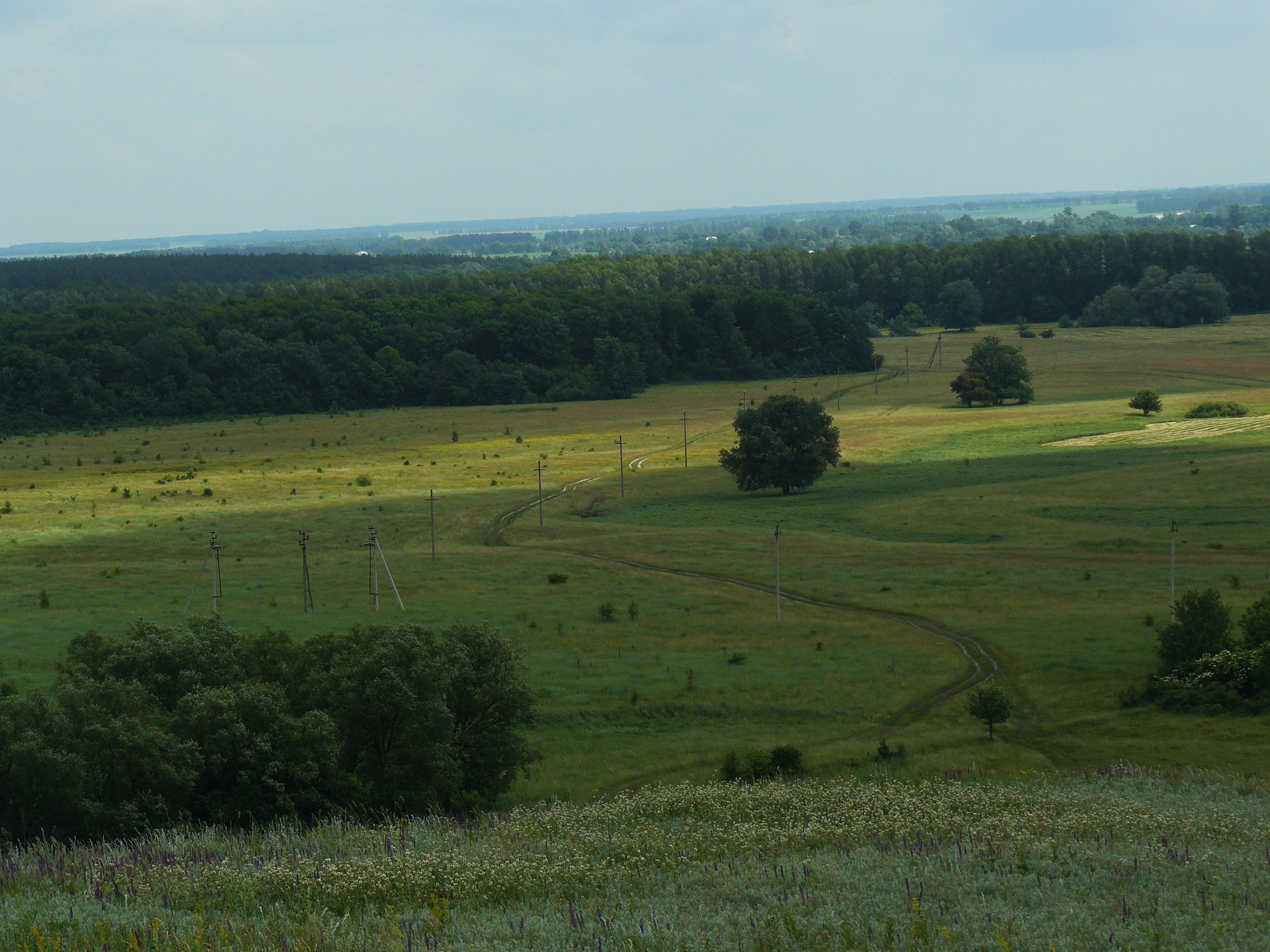
- Agricultural land in Grayvoronsky District

- Flag Coat of arms
- Location of Grayvoronsky District in Belgorod Oblast
- Coordinates: 50°29′N 35°40′E
- Country: Russia
- Federal subject: Belgorod Oblast
- Established: 30 July 1928
- Administrative center: Grayvoron

Area
  - Total: 853.80 km^{2} (329.65 sq mi)

Population (2010 Census)
  - Total: 29,137
  - Estimate (2015): 29,544
  - Density: 34.126/km^{2} (88.387/sq mi)
  - Urban: 21.4%
  - Rural: 78.6%

Administrative structure
  - Inhabited localities: 1 cities/towns, 39 rural localities

Municipal structure
  - Municipally incorporated as: Grayvoronsky Municipal District
  - Municipal divisions: 1 urban settlements, 12 rural settlements
- Time zone: UTC+3 (MSK)
- OKTMO ID: 14632000
- Website: http://www.graivoron.ru/

Grayvoronsky District (Russian: Грайворо́нский райо́н) is an administrative district (raion), one of the twenty-one in Belgorod Oblast, Russia. Municipally, it is incorporated as Grayvoronsky Municipal District. It is located in the west of the oblast. The area of the district is 853.8 square kilometers (329.7 sq mi). Its administrative center is the town of Grayvoron. Population: 29,137 (2010 census); 31,567 (2002 Census). The population of Grayvoron accounts for 21.4% of the district's total population.

== History ==
The district was formerly part of Grayvoronsky Uyezd, which had an area of about 3,000 square kilometres (1,200 sq mi).

=== Russian invasion ===
In May 2023, during the Russian invasion of Ukraine, the governor of Belgorod Oblast, Vyacheslav Gladkov, said that Ukrainian "sabotage groups" entered the district from Ukraine. Ukrainian media reported that the cross-border excursion was performed by Russian rebel opposition groups, the Russian Volunteer Corps and the Freedom of Russia Legion.

According to the Washington Post, between April 2023 and April 2024, at least 11 of Russian glide bombs crashed into the district where some could not be recovered because of the "difficult operational situation."

== Geography ==
Grayvoronsky District sits at the southwest corner of Belgorod Oblast, on the border with Ukraine. It is bordered on the south and west by Kharkiv Oblast and Sumy Oblast (both of Ukraine), on the north by Krasnogvardeysky District, Belgorod Oblast and Rakityansky District, and on the east by Borisovsky District. The administrative center of the district is the town of Grayvoron. The district is 50 kilometers (31 mi) west of the city of Belgorod, and is 55 kilometers (34 mi) northwest of the Ukrainian city of Kharkiv.

The terrain is a hilly plain averaging 200 meters (660 ft) above sea level; the district lies on the Orel-Kursk plateau of the Central Russian Upland. The major river through the district is the Vorskla River, which flows east to west through the district, eventually joining the Dnieper River.
