= Flag of Belgorod Oblast =

Belgorod Oblast
- Proportion: 2:3
- Adopted: 22 June 2000
- Design: A blue cross with four cantons (white, green, black and red) and the coat of arms on the white canton.

The flag of Belgorod Oblast, a federal subject of Russia, was adopted on 22 June 2000. The flag consists of a blue cross, the four cantons colored (clockwise from top left) white, green, black and red. The white canton is charged with the coat of arms of Belgorod Oblast, consisting of a lion at rest and an eagle above it. The ratio of the flag is 2:3.

== Timeline ==
Flag	Date	Use	Ref.
	1693–1721	Flag of Principality of Belgorod	
	1721–1857	Flag of Belgorod Governorate	
	1858–1883	Flag of Belgorodsky Uyezd	
	1883–1917	Flag of Belgorodsky Uyezd	
	1918–1936	Flag of Belgorod Oblast	
	1937–1954	Flag of Belgorod Oblast	
	1955–1991	Flag of Belgorod Oblast	

== Other flags ==
=== Administrative divisions ===
Flag	Date	Use	Ref.
	?–present	Flag of Belgorod city	
	April 28, 2015–present	Flag of Alexeyevka	
	December 17, 1999–present	Flag of Gubkin	
	June 10, 2003–present	Flag of Shebekino	
	November 21, 2008–present	Flag of Stary Oskol	
	?–present	Flag of Valuyki	
	?–present	Flag of Alexeyevsky District	
	?–present	Flag of Belgorodsky District	
	?–present	Flag of Borisovsky District	
	?–present	Flag of Chernyansky District	
	?–present	Flag of Gubkinsky District	
	July 10, 2003–present	Flag of Grayvoronsky District	
	September 9, 2008–present	Flag of Ivnyansky District	
	?–present	Flag of Korochansky District	
	?–present	Flag of Krasnensky District	
	?–present	Flag of Krasnogvardeysky District	
	?–present	Flag of Krasnoyaruzhsky District	
	?–present	Flag of Novooskolsky District	
	?–present	Flag of Prokhorovsky District	
	October 31, 2007–present	Flag of Rakityansky District	
	?–present	Flag of Rovensky District	
	June 10, 2003–present	Flag of Shebekinsky District	
	?–present	Flag of Starooskolsky District	
	?–present	Flag of Valuysky District	
	September 2015–present	Flag of Veydelevsky District	
	March–September 2015	Flag of Veydelevsky District	
	2014–present	Flag of Volokonovsky District	
	November 19, 2018–present	Flag of Yakovlevsky District	

=== Settlements ===
Flag	Date	Use	Ref.
	February 26, 2021–present	Flag of Oktyabrsky	
	July 30, 2021–present	Flag of Razumnoye	
	March 31, 2021–present	Flag of Severny	
	May 27, 2021–present	Flag of Belovskoye	
	May 14, 2021–present	Flag of Belomestnoye	
	August 26, 2021–present	Flag of Bessonovskoye	
	July 22, 2021–present	Flag of Veselolopanskoye	
	May 27, 2021–present	Flag of Golovinskoye	
	April 29, 2021–present	Flag of Dubivskoye	
	June 25, 2021–present	Flag of Erikovskoye	
	March 26, 2021–present	Flag of Zhuravlyovskoye	
	June 30, 2021–present	Flag of Komsomolsky	
	February 9, 2021–present	Flag of Krasnooktyabrsky	
	March 31, 2021–present	Flag of Krutologskoye	
	April 28, 2021–present	Flag of Mayskoye	
	July 29, 2021–present	Flag of Malinovskoye	
	July 21, 2021–present	Flag of Nikolskoye	
	June 24, 2021–present	Flag of Novosadovskoye	
	April 27, 2021–present	Flag of Pushkarskoye	
	June 30, 2021–present	Flag of Streletsoye	
	February 5, 2021–present	Flag of Tavrovskoye	
	July 22, 2021–present	Flag of Khokhovskoye	
	April 23, 2021–present	Flag of Shetinovskoye	
	May 31, 2021–present	Flag of Yasnozorenskoye	
	September 30, 2019–present	Flag of Chernyanka	
	March 19, 2019–present	Flag of Andreevskoye	
	March 18, 2019–present	Flag of Bolshanskoye	
	February 11, 2019–present	Flag of Volokonovskoye	
	March 28, 2019–present	Flag of Volotovskoye	
	February 11, 2019–present	Flag of Ezdochenskoye	
	July 24, 2019–present	Flag of kochegurenskoye	
	July 17, 2019–present	Flag of Loznovskoye	
	August 21, 2019–present	Flag of Lubyanskoye	
	July 31, 2019–present	Flag of Malotroitske	
	August 7, 2019–present	Flag of Novorechenskoye	
	April 22, 2019–present	Flag of Ogibnyanskoye	
	August 20, 2019–present	Flag of Opshanskoye	
	August 16, 2019–present	Flag of Orlikovskoye	
	September 27, 2019–present	Flag of Prilepenskoye	
	March 12, 2019–present	Flag of Russkokhalanskoye	

=== Other ===
Flag	Date	Use	Ref.
	1712	Banner of the Belgorod Infantry Regiment	
