= Administrative divisions of Belgorod Oblast =

Oblast in Central Federal District, Russia

Belgorod Oblast Белгородская область (Russian)
- Oblast
- Flag Coat of arms

- Coordinates: 50°46′N 37°27′E
- Country: Russia
- Federal district: Central
- Economic region: Central Black Earth
- Established: 6 January 1954
- Administrative center: Belgorod

Government
  - Body: Oblast Duma
  - Governor: Vyacheslav Gladkov

Area
  - Total: 27,134 km^{2} (10,476 sq mi)
  - Rank: 67th

Population (2021 census)
  - Total: 1,540,486
  - Estimate (January 2013): 1,541,000
  - Rank: 30th
  - Density: 56.773/km^{2} (147.04/sq mi)
  - Urban: 65.2%
  - Rural: 34.8%

GDP (nominal, 2024)
  - Total: ₽1.52 trillion (US$20.57 billion)
  - Per capita: ₽1.02 million (US$13,792.18)
- Time zone: UTC+
- ISO 3166 code: RU-BEL
- License plates: 31
- Official languages: Russian
- Website: www.belregion.ru

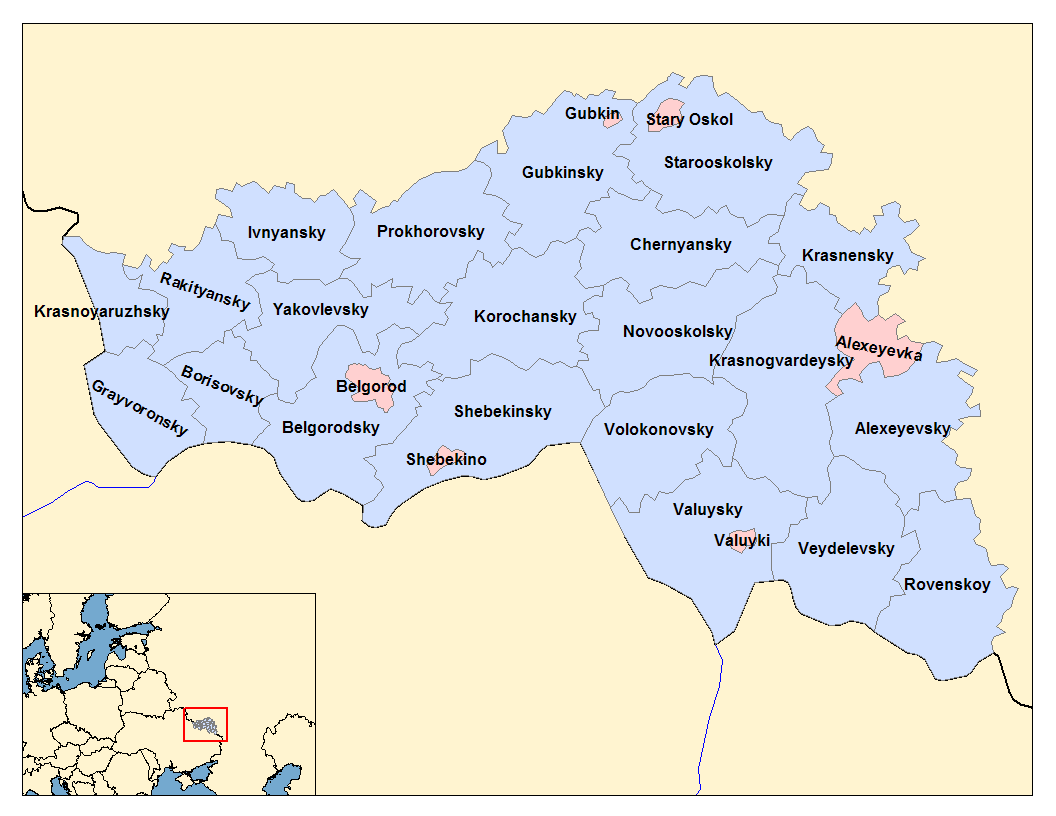
Administrative divisions of Belgorod Oblast

Administrative divisions of Belgorod Oblast comprise the various administrative and municipal divisions of Belgorod Oblast, a federal subject of Russia located in the Central Federal District. As of 2026, the administrative structure is governed by the regional laws of the oblast, centering on the city of Belgorod. The oblast is divided into cities under the oblast's jurisdiction and several administrative districts (raions). This structure is mirrored by a municipal organization consisting of city okrugs and municipal okrugs, designed to facilitate local self-governance across the region's urban and rural localities.

== Administrative divisions ==
- Cities and towns under the oblast's jurisdiction:
  - Belgorod (Белгород) serves as the administrative center of the oblast. For administrative purposes, the city is divided into two okrugs: Vostochny and Zapadny.
  - Alexeyevka (Алексеевка)
  - Gubkin (Губкин)
  - Shebekino (Шебекино)
  - Stary Oskol (Старый Оскол)
  - Valuyki (Валуйки)
- Districts:
  - Alexeyevsky (Алексеевский)
    - with 20 municipal okrugs under the district's jurisdiction.
  - Belgorodsky (Белгородский)
    - Urban-type settlements under the district's jurisdiction:
      - Oktyabrsky (Октябрьский)
      - Razumnoye (Разумное)
      - Severny (Северный)
    - with 21 municipal okrugs under the district's jurisdiction.
  - Borisovsky (Борисовский)
    - Urban-type settlements under the district's jurisdiction:
      - Borisovka (Борисовка)
    - with 8 municipal okrugs under the district's jurisdiction.
  - Chernyansky (Чернянский)
    - Urban-type settlements under the district's jurisdiction:
      - Chernyanka (Чернянка)
    - with 15 municipal okrugs under the district's jurisdiction.
  - Grayvoronsky (Грайворонский)
    - Towns under the district's jurisdiction:
      - Grayvoron (Грайворон)
    - with 12 municipal okrugs under the district's jurisdiction.
  - Gubkinsky (Губкинский)
  - Ivnyansky (Ивнянский)
    - Urban-type settlements under the district's jurisdiction:
      - Ivnya (Ивня)
    - with 13 municipal okrugs under the district's jurisdiction.
  - Korochansky (Корочанский)
    - Towns under the district's jurisdiction:
      - Korocha (Короча)
    - with 22 municipal okrugs under the district's jurisdiction.
  - Krasnensky (Красненский)
    - with 10 municipal okrugs under the district's jurisdiction.
  - Krasnogvardeysky (Красногвардейский)
    - Towns under the district's jurisdiction:
      - Biryuch (Бирюч)
    - with 13 municipal okrugs under the district's jurisdiction.
  - Krasnoyaruzhsky (Краснояружский)
    - Urban-type settlements under the district's jurisdiction:
      - Krasnaya Yaruga (Красная Яруга)
    - with 7 municipal okrugs under the district's jurisdiction.
  - Novooskolsky (Новооскольский)
    - Towns under the district's jurisdiction:
      - Novy Oskol (Новый Оскол)
    - with 17 municipal okrugs under the district's jurisdiction.
  - Prokhorovsky (Прохоровский)
    - Urban-type settlements under the district's jurisdiction:
      - Prokhorovka (Прохоровка)
    - with 17 municipal okrugs under the district's jurisdiction.
  - Rakityansky (Ракитянский)
    - Urban-type settlements under the district's jurisdiction:
      - Proletarsky (Пролетарский)
      - Rakitnoye (Ракитное)
    - with 11 municipal okrugs under the district's jurisdiction.
  - Rovensky (Ровеньский)
    - Urban-type settlements under the district's jurisdiction:
      - Rovenki (Ровеньки)
    - with 11 municipal okrugs under the district's jurisdiction.
  - Shebekinsky (Шебекинский)
    - Urban-type settlements under the district's jurisdiction:
      - Maslova Pristan (Маслова Пристань)
    - with 13 municipal okrugs under the district's jurisdiction.
  - Starooskolsky (Старооскольский)
  - Valuysky (Валуйский)
    - Urban-type settlements under the district's jurisdiction:
      - Urazovo (Уразово)
    - with 14 municipal okrugs under the district's jurisdiction.
  - Veydelevsky (Вейделевский)
    - Urban-type settlements under the district's jurisdiction:
      - Veydelevka (Вейделевка)
    - with 11 municipal okrugs under the district's jurisdiction.
  - Volokonovsky (Волоконовский)
    - Urban-type settlements under the district's jurisdiction:
      - Pyatnitskoye (Пятницкое)
      - Volokonovka (Волоконовка)
    - with 12 municipal okrugs under the district's jurisdiction.
  - Yakovlevsky (Яковлевский)
    - Towns under the district's jurisdiction:
      - Stroitel (Строитель)
    - Urban-type settlements under the district's jurisdiction:
      - Tomarovka (Томаровка)
      - Yakovlevo (Яковлево)
    - with 14 municipal okrugs under the district's jurisdiction.

== Summary table ==
Belgorod Oblast Administrative Summary
Belgorod Oblast, Russia
Flag of Belgorod Oblast
Administrative center	Belgorod
Number of districts	21
Number of cities/towns	11
Number of urban-type settlements	18
Number of municipal okrugs	261
