= Stary Oskol constituency =

Russian legislative constituency in Belgorod Oblast

Stary Oskol single-member constituency
- Constituency of the Russian State Duma

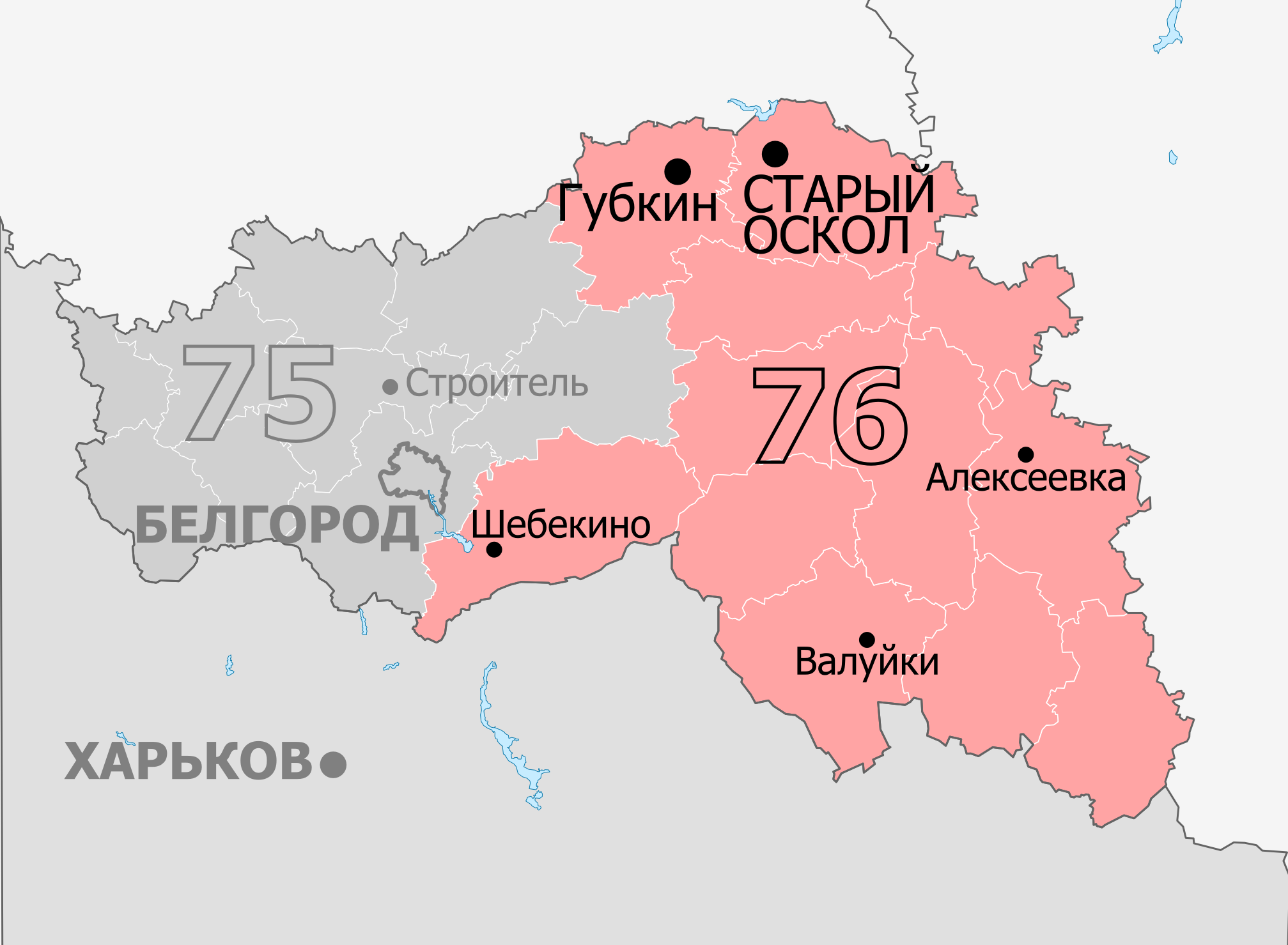
- Constituency boundaries since 2016
- Deputy: Andrey Skoch; United Russia
- Federal subject: Belgorod Oblast
- Districts: Alekseyevka, Alexeyevsky, Chernyansky, Gubkin, Gubkinsky, Krasnensky, Krasnogvardeysky, Novooskolsky, Rovensky, Shebekino, Shebekinsky, Starooskolsky, Stary Oskol, Valuyki, Valuysky, Veydelevsky, Volokonovsky
- Voters: 581,073 (2026)

The Stary Oskol constituency (No.80 (Note: Novy Oskol constituency No.64 in 1993-1995, Novy Oskol constituency No.63 in 1995-2003, Novy Oskol constituency No.65 in 2003-2007, No.76 in 2016–2026)) is a Russian legislative constituency in Belgorod Oblast. The constituency covers eastern Belgorod Oblast.

The constituency has been represented since 1999 (except for 2007–2016) by United Russia deputy Andrey Skoch, a billionaire businessman and USM Holdings co-owner.

== Boundaries ==
1993–2007 Novy Oskol constituency: Alekseyevka, Alexeyevsky District, Chernyansky District, Gubkin, Gubkinsky District, Krasnensky District, Krasnogvardeysky District, Novooskolsky District, Rovensky District, Starooskolsky District, Stary Oskol, Valuyki, Valuysky District, Veydelevsky District, Volokonovsky District
The constituency covered eastern Belgorod Oblast, including the cities of Alekseyevka, Gubkin, Stary Oskol and Valuyki.

2016–present: Alekseyevka, Alexeyevsky District, Chernyansky District, Gubkin, Gubkinsky District, Krasnensky District, Krasnogvardeysky District, Novooskolsky District, Rovensky District, Shebekino, Shebekinsky District, Starooskolsky District, Stary Oskol, Valuyki, Valuysky District, Veydelevsky District, Volokonovsky District
The constituency was re-created for the 2016 election under the name "Stary Oskol constituency". It retained all of its territory and gained Shebekino and Shebekinsky District from Belgorod constituency.

== Members elected ==
Election	Member	Party
1993	Boris Zamay	Independent
1995	Oleg Kuleshov	Communist Party
1999	Andrey Skoch	Independent
2003	Andrey Skoch	Independent
2007	Proportional representation - no election by constituency	
2011	Proportional representation - no election by constituency	
2016	Andrey Skoch	United Russia
2021	Andrey Skoch	United Russia
2026	Andrey Skoch	United Russia

== Election results ==
=== 1993 ===
Summary of the 12 December 1993 Russian legislative election in the Novy Oskol constituency
Candidate	Party	Votes	%
Boris Zamay	Independent	75,197	21.46%
Oleg Polukhin	Civic Union	68,443	19.53%
Vasily Poderyagin	Independent	52,032	14.85%
Aleksandr Panin	Independent	50,133	14.31%
Sergey Klenikov	Independent	24,103	6.88%
Ivan Sergeyev	Choice of Russia	16,362	4.67%
Sergey Sergeyev	Democratic Party	8,859	2.53%
against all		34,584	9.87%
Total		350,411	100%

=== 1995 ===
Summary of the 17 December 1995 Russian legislative election in the Novy Oskol constituency
Candidate	Party	Votes	%
Oleg Kuleshov	Communist Party	120,483	29.62%
Boris Zamay (incumbent)	Independent	65,505	16.11%
Yury Selivyorstov	Independent	58,175	14.30%
Valery Varganov	Our Home – Russia	51,579	12.68%
Sergey Sychyov	Liberal Democratic Party	41,289	10.15%
Anatoly Kashpirovsky	Ivan Rybkin Bloc	21,933	5.39%
Nikolay Chuprina	Agrarian Party	21,080	5.18%
against all		21,692	5.33%
Total		406,730	100%

=== 1999 ===
Summary of the 19 December 1999 Russian legislative election in the Novy Oskol constituency
Candidate	Party	Votes	%
Andrey Skoch	Independent	199,565	53.24%
Fyodor Ladygin	Independent	47,614	12.70%
Aleksandr Goncharov	Unity	31,212	8.33%
Vladimir Averin	Kedr	20,196	5.39%
Boris Zamay	Independent	14,005	3.74%
Valery Kirpichnikov	Yabloko	9,984	2.66%
against all		42,708	11.39%
Total		374,863	100%

=== 2003 ===
Summary of the 7 December 2003 Russian legislative election in the Novy Oskol constituency
Candidate	Party	Votes	%
Andrey Skoch (incumbent)	Independent	269,613	71.68%
Oleg Kuleshov	Communist Party	47,018	12.50%
Vladimir Usachev	Liberal Democratic Party	8,513	2.26%
Yury Ruda	Independent	4,653	1.24%
Nikolay Naydenov	Independent	4,064	1.08%
Vyacheslav Panov	United Russian Party Rus'	3,723	0.99%
against all		33,301	8.85%
Total		376,244	100%

=== 2016 ===
Summary of the 18 September 2016 Russian legislative election in the Stary Oskol constituency
Candidate	Party	Votes	%
Andrey Skoch	United Russia	283,931	72.96%
Stanislav Panov	Communist Party	37,024	9.51%
Konstantin Klimashevsky	Liberal Democratic Party	21,138	5.43%
Sergey Bocharnikov	A Just Russia	19,583	5.03%
Dmitry Fedorchenko	Communists of Russia	7,986	2.05%
Valery Borisovsky	Independent	5,459	1.40%
Aleksandr Sobolev	Rodina	3,625	0.93%
Andrey Maysak	Civic Platform	2,792	0.72%
Total		389,154	100%

=== 2021 ===
Summary of the 17-19 September 2021 Russian legislative election in the Stary Oskol constituency
Candidate	Party	Votes	%
Andrey Skoch (incumbent)	United Russia	236,467	63.90%
Nikolay Mishustin	Communist Party	59,852	16.17%
Oleg Korchagin	A Just Russia — For Truth	15,969	4.32%
Georgy Zaytsev	New People	11,945	3.23%
Konstantin Klimashevsky	Liberal Democratic Party	10,783	2.91%
Andrey Kolosov	Party of Pensioners	9,972	2.69%
Artyom Goncharov	Russian Party of Freedom and Justice	9,058	2.45%
Andrey Drozdov	The Greens	4,484	1.21%
Aleksandr Yeskov	Rodina	3,637	0.98%
Total		370,049	100%

=== 2026 ===
Summary of the 18-20 September 2026 Russian legislative election in the Stary Oskol constituency
Candidate	Party	Votes	%
Andrey Skoch (incumbent)	United Russia	274,693	74.35%
Yury Krivoderov	Communist Party	26,805	7.26%
Bogdan Chervinsky	Liberal Democratic Party	20,309	5.50%
Oleg Korchagin	A Just Russia	18,254	4.94%
Anton Khatuntsev	New People	16,576	4.49%
Aleksandr Moskvitin	Rodina	8,108	2.19%
Total		369,465	100%
