= Volokonovka =

Volokonovka (Russian: Волоконовка) is the name of several inhabited localities in Russia.

== Urban localities ==
- Volokonovka, Volokonovsky District, Belgorod Oblast, a work settlement in Volokonovsky District of Belgorod Oblast

== Rural localities ==
- Volokonovka, Chernyansky District, Belgorod Oblast, a selo in Chernyansky District, Belgorod Oblast
- Volokonovka, Voronezh Oblast, a selo in Bondarevskoye Rural Settlement of Kantemirovsky District of Voronezh Oblast
