= Svyatoslavka =

Svyatoslavka Святославка
- Selo
- Location within Belgorod Oblast Location within Russia
- Coordinates: 50°52′N 35°40′E
- Country: Russia
- Region: Belgorod Oblast
- District: Rakityansky District
- Time zone: UTC+3:00

Svyatoslavka (Russian: Святославка) is a rural locality (a selo) in Rakityansky District, Belgorod Oblast, Russia. The population was 345 as of 2010. There are 6 streets.

== Geography ==
Svyatoslavka is located 14 km northwest of Rakitnoye (the district's administrative centre) by road. Novoyasenovka is the nearest rural locality.
