= Ladomirovka =

Ladomirovka Ладомировка
- Selo
- Location within Belgorod Oblast Location within Russia
- Coordinates: 50°15′N 38°55′E
- Country: Russia
- Region: Belgorod Oblast
- District: Rovensky District
- Time zone: UTC+3:00

Ladomirovka (Russian: Ладомировка) is a rural locality (a selo) and the administrative center of Ladomirovskoye Rural Settlement, Rovensky District, Belgorod Oblast, Russia. The population was 755 as of 2010. There are 5 streets.

== Geography ==
Ladomirovka is located 45 km north of Rovenki (the district's administrative centre) by road. Sidorov is the nearest rural locality.
