= Yarskoye, Belgorod Oblast =

Yarskoye Ярское
- Selo
- Location within Belgorod Oblast Location within Russia
- Coordinates: 50°39′N 37°33′E
- Country: Russia
- Region: Belgorod Oblast
- District: Novooskolsky District
- Time zone: UTC+3:00

Yarskoye (Russian: Ярское) is a rural locality (a selo) and the administrative center of Yarskoye Rural Settlement, Novooskolsky District, Belgorod Oblast, Russia. The population was 745 as of 2010. There are 4 streets.

== Geography ==
Yarskoye is located 30 km southwest of Novy Oskol (the district's administrative centre) by road. Bogdanovka is the nearest rural locality.
