= Zakutskoye =

Zakutskoye Закутское
- Selo
- Location within Belgorod Oblast Location within Russia
- Coordinates: 50°09′N 38°38′E
- Country: Russia
- Region: Belgorod Oblast
- District: Veydelevsky District
- Time zone: UTC+3:00

Zakutskoye (Russian: Закутское) is a rural locality (a selo) and the administrative center of Zakutchanskoye Rural Settlement, Veydelevsky District, Belgorod Oblast, Russia. The population was 647 as of 2010. There are 8 streets.

== Geography ==
Zakutskoye is located 17 km east of Veydelevka (the district's administrative centre) by road. Shevtsov is the nearest rural locality.
