= Bankino =

Bankino Банкино
- Selo
- Location within Belgorod Oblast Location within Russia
- Coordinates: 50°06′N 38°44′E
- Country: Russia
- Region: Belgorod Oblast
- District: Veydelevsky District
- Time zone: UTC+3:00

Bankino (Russian: Банкино) is a rural locality (a selo) in Veydelevsky District, Belgorod Oblast, Russia. The population was 171 as of 2010. There are 3 streets.

== Geography ==
Bankino is located 24 km east of Veydelevka (the district's administrative centre) by road. Galushki is the nearest rural locality.
