= Yasnye Zori =

Yasnye Zori Ясные Зори
- Selo
- Location within Belgorod Oblast Location within Russia
- Coordinates: 50°22′N 36°30′E
- Country: Russia
- Region: Belgorod Oblast
- District: Belgorodsky District
- Time zone: UTC+3:00

Yasnye Zori (Russian: Ясные Зори) is a rural locality (a selo) and the administrative center of Yasnozorenskoye Rural Settlement, Belgorodsky District, Belgorod Oblast, Russia. The population was 1,715 as of 2010. There are 17 streets.

== Geography ==
Yasnye Zori is located 24 km south of Maysky (the district's administrative centre) by road. Cheremoshnoye is the nearest rural locality.
