= Yerik =

Yerik may refer to:

== People ==
- Yerik Asanbayev (1936–2004), Kazakh statesman and vice-president
- Yerik Utembayev, Kazakh diplomat

== Places ==
- Yerik, Belgorod Oblast, Russia
- Yerik, Volgograd Oblast, Russia
