= Kurasovka =

Kurasovka Курасовка
- Selo
- Location within Belgorod Oblast Location within Russia
- Coordinates: 51°03′N 36°13′E
- Country: Russia
- Region: Belgorod Oblast
- District: Ivnyansky District
- Time zone: UTC+3:00

Kurasovka (Russian: Курасовка) is a rural locality (a selo) and the administrative center of Kurasovskoye Rural Settlement, Ivnyansky District, Belgorod Oblast, Russia. The population was 1,456 as of 2010. There are 15 streets.

== Geography ==
Kurasovka is located 7 km west of Ivnya (the district's administrative centre) by road. Voznesenovka is the nearest rural locality.
