= Pridorozhny, Belgorod Oblast =

Pridorozhny Придорожный
- Khutor
- Location within Belgorod Oblast Location within Russia
- Coordinates: 50°08′N 38°32′E
- Country: Russia
- Region: Belgorod Oblast
- District: Veydelevsky District
- Time zone: UTC+3:00

Pridorozhny (Russian: Придорожный) is a rural locality (a khutor) in Veydelevsky District, Belgorod Oblast, Russia. The population was 58 as of 2010. There is 1 street.

== Geography ==
Pridorozhny is located 8 km east of Veydelevka (the district's administrative centre) by road. Privetny is the nearest rural locality.
