= Verkhnyaya Serebryanka =

Verkhnyaya Serebryanka Верхняя Серебрянка
- Selo
- Location within Belgorod Oblast Location within Russia
- Coordinates: 49°50′N 39°02′E
- Country: Russia
- Region: Belgorod Oblast
- District: Rovensky District
- Time zone: UTC+3:00

Verkhnyaya Serebryanka (Russian: Верхняя Серебрянка) is a rural locality (a selo) and the administrative center of Verkhneserebryanskoye Rural Settlement, Rovensky District, Belgorod Oblast, Russia. The population was 844 as of 2010. There are 4 streets.

== Geography ==
Verkhnyaya Serebryanka is located 19 km southeast of Rovenki (the district's administrative centre) by road. Nizhnyaya Serebryanka is the nearest rural locality.
