= Belovsky (rural locality) =

Belovsky (Russian: Беловский; masculine), Belovskaya (Беловская; feminine), or Belovskoye (Беловское; neuter) is the name of several rural localities in Russia:

- Belovsky, Altai Krai, a settlement in Belovsky Selsoviet of Troitsky District of Altai Krai
- Belovsky, Oryol Oblast, a settlement in Dubovitsky Selsoviet of Maloarkhangelsky District of Oryol Oblast
- Belovsky, Stavropol Krai, a khutor in Kochubeyevsky District of Stavropol Krai
- Belovskoye, Belgorod Oblast, a selo in Belgorodsky District of Belgorod Oblast
- Belovskoye, Ivanovo Oblast, a village in Rodnikovsky District of Ivanovo Oblast
- Belovskoye, Yaroslavl Oblast, a village in Shashkovsky Rural Okrug of Rybinsky District of Yaroslavl Oblast
- Belovskaya, Moscow Oblast, a village in Dmitrovskoye Rural Settlement of Shatursky District of Moscow Oblast
- Belovskaya, Nizhny Novgorod Oblast, a village in Kocherginsky Selsoviet of Balakhninsky District of Nizhny Novgorod Oblast
- Belovskaya, Vologda Oblast, a village in Avksentyevsky Selsoviet of Ust-Kubinsky District of Vologda Oblast
- Belovskaya, Nekouzsky Rural Okrug, Nekouzsky District, Yaroslavl Oblast, a village in Nekouzsky Rural Okrug of Nekouzsky District of Yaroslavl Oblast
- Belovskaya, Novinsky Rural Okrug, Nekouzsky District, Yaroslavl Oblast, a village in Novinsky Rural Okrug of Nekouzsky District of Yaroslavl Oblast
