= Loznaya =

Loznaya Лозная
- Selo
- Location within Belgorod Oblast Location within Russia
- Coordinates: 49°57′N 38°45′E
- Country: Russia
- Region: Belgorod Oblast
- District: Rovensky District
- Time zone: UTC+3:00

Loznaya (Russian: Лозная) is a rural locality (a selo) and the administrative center of Loznyanskoye Rural Settlement, Rovensky District, Belgorod Oblast, Russia. The population was 948 as of 2010. There are 6 streets.

== Geography ==
Loznaya is located 13 km northwest of Rovenki (the district's administrative centre) by road. Klinovy is the nearest rural locality.
