= Verbnoye =

Verbnoye Вербное
- Selo
- Location within Belgorod Oblast Location within Russia
- Coordinates: 50°48′N 38°41′E
- Country: Russia
- Region: Belgorod Oblast
- District: Krasnensky District
- Time zone: UTC+3:00

Verbnoye (Russian: Вербное) is a rural locality (a selo) in Krasnensky District, Belgorod Oblast, Russia. The population was 102 as of 2010. There are 3 streets.

== Geography ==
Verbnoye is located 18 km south of Krasnoye (the district's administrative centre) by road. Gotovye is the nearest rural locality.
