= Kochegury =

Kochegury Кочегуры
- Selo
- Location within Belgorod Oblast Location within Russia
- Coordinates: 51°00′N 37°34′E
- Country: Russia
- Region: Belgorod Oblast
- District: Chernyansky District
- Time zone: UTC+3:00

Kochegury (Russian: Кочегуры) is a rural locality (a selo) and the administrative center of Kochegurenskoye Rural Settlement, Chernyansky District, Belgorod Oblast, Russia. The population was 908 as of 2010. There are 6 streets.

== Geography ==
Kochegury is located 25 km northwest of Chernyanka (the district's administrative centre) by road. Protochnoye is the nearest rural locality.
