= Dontsov, Belgorod Oblast =

Dontsov Донцов
- Khutor
- Location within Belgorod Oblast Location within Russia
- Coordinates: 50°56′N 36°03′E
- Country: Russia
- Region: Belgorod Oblast
- District: Rakityansky District
- Time zone: UTC+3:00

Dontsov (Russian: Донцов) is a rural locality (a khutor) in Rakityansky District, Belgorod Oblast, Russia. The population was 52 as of 2010.

== Geography ==
Dontsov is located 28 km northeast of Rakitnoye (the district's administrative centre) by road. Melovoye is the nearest rural locality.
