= Volchy =

Volchy Волчий
- Khutor
- Location within Belgorod Oblast Location within Russia
- Coordinates: 49°58′N 38°30′E
- Country: Russia
- Region: Belgorod Oblast
- District: Veydelevsky District
- Time zone: UTC+3:00

Volchy (Russian: Волчий) is a rural locality (a khutor) in Veydelevsky District, Belgorod Oblast, Russia. The population was 171 as of 2010. There is 1 street.

== Geography ==
Volchy is located 23 km south of Veydelevka (the district's administrative centre) by road. Solontsy is the nearest rural locality.
