= Rzhevka, Rovensky District, Belgorod Oblast =

Rzhevka Ржевка
- Selo
- Location within Belgorod Oblast Location within Russia
- Coordinates: 50°03′N 39°04′E
- Country: Russia
- Region: Belgorod Oblast
- District: Rovensky District
- Time zone: UTC+3:00

Rzhevka (Russian: Ржевка) is a rural locality (a selo) and the administrative center of Rzhevskoye Rural Settlement, Rovensky District, Belgorod Oblast, Russia. The population was 589 as of 2010. There are 6 streets.

== Geography ==
Rzhevka is located 23 km northeast of Rovenki (the district's administrative centre) by road. Nagorye is the nearest rural locality.
