= Svistovka =

Svistovka Свистовка
- Selo
- Location within Belgorod Oblast Location within Russia
- Coordinates: 50°59′N 38°45′E
- Country: Russia
- Region: Belgorod Oblast
- District: Krasnensky District
- Time zone: UTC+3:00

Svistovka (Russian: Свистовка) is a rural locality (a selo) in Krasnensky District, Belgorod Oblast, Russia. The population was 124 as of 2010. There are 2 streets.

== Geography ==
Svistovka is located 10 km northeast of Krasnoye (the district's administrative centre) by road. Kiselevka is the nearest rural locality.
