= Chernyanka =

Chernyanka (Russian: Черня́нка) is the name of several inhabited localities in Russia.

Urban localities

- Chernyanka, Belgorod Oblast, a settlement in Chernyansky District of Belgorod Oblast

Rural localities

- Chernyanka, Kursk Oblast, a selo in Yefremovsky Selsoviet of Cheremisinovsky District of Kursk Oblast
