= Vesyolaya Lopan =

Vesyolaya Lopan Весёлая Лопань
- Selo
- Location within Belgorod Oblast Location within Russia
- Coordinates: 50°29′N 36°23′E
- Country: Russia
- Region: Belgorod Oblast
- District: Belgorodsky District
- Time zone: UTC+3:00

Vesyolaya Lopan (Russian: Весёлая Лопань) is a rural locality (a selo) and the administrative center of Vesyololopansky Rural Settlement, Belgorodsky District, Belgorod Oblast, Russia. The population was 2,696 as of 2010. There are 40 streets.

== Geography ==
Vesyolaya Lopan is located 8 km southwest of Maysky (the district's administrative centre) by road. Dolbino is the nearest rural locality.
