= Yakovlevo =

Yakovlevo (Russian: Яковлево) is the name of several rural localities in Russia:

- Yakovlevo, Arkhangelsk Oblast, a village in Kotlassky District of Arkhangelsk Oblast
- Yakovlevo, Belgorod Oblast, an urban-type settlement in Yakovlevsky District of Belgorod Oblast
