= Kharkovskoye =

Kharkovskoye Харьковское
- Selo
- Location within Belgorod Oblast Location within Russia
- Coordinates: 50°12′N 39°02′E
- Country: Russia
- Region: Belgorod Oblast
- District: Rovensky District
- Time zone: UTC+3:00

Kharkovskoye (Russian: Харьковское) is a rural locality (a selo) and the administrative center of Kharkovskoye Rural Settlement, Rovensky District, Belgorod Oblast, Russia. The population was 584 as of 2010. There are 8 streets.

== Geography ==
Kharkovskoye is located 44 km north of Rovenki (the district's administrative centre) by road. Kalinichenkovo is the nearest rural locality.
