= Verkhopenye =

Verkhopenye Верхопенье
- Selo
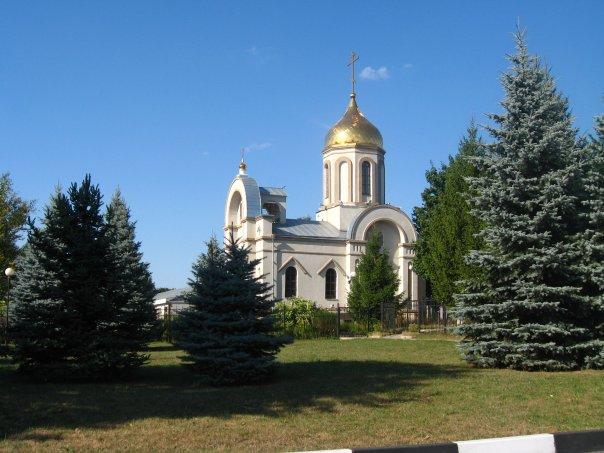
- Church in Verholenye

- Location within Belgorod Oblast Location within Russia
- Coordinates: 50°56′N 36°17′E
- Country: Russia
- Region: Belgorod Oblast
- District: Ivnyansky District
- Time zone: UTC+3:00

Verkhopenye (Russian: Верхопенье) is a rural locality (a selo) in Ivnyansky District, Belgorod Oblast, Russia. The population was 2,410 as of 2010. There are 22 streets.

== Geography ==
Verkhopenye is located 22 km north of Ivnya (the district's administrative centre) by road. Syrtsevo is the nearest rural locality.
