= Chistopolye =

Chistopolye Чистополье
- Selo
- Location within Belgorod Oblast Location within Russia
- Coordinates: 50°47′N 35°55′E
- Country: Russia
- Region: Belgorod Oblast
- District: Rakityansky District
- Time zone: UTC+3:00

Chistopolye (Russian: Чистополье) is a rural locality (a selo) in Rakityansky District, Belgorod Oblast, Russia. The population was 269 as of 2010. There is 1 street.

== Geography ==
Chistopolye is located 10 km southeast of Rakitnoye (the district's administrative centre) by road. Sumovsky is the nearest rural locality.
