= Novorechye =

Novorechye Новоречье
- Selo
- Location within Belgorod Oblast Location within Russia
- Coordinates: 51°01′N 38°11′E
- Country: Russia
- Region: Belgorod Oblast
- District: Chernyansky District
- Time zone: UTC+3:00

Novorechye (Russian: Новоречье) is a rural locality (a selo) and the administrative center of Novorechenskoye Rural Settlement, Chernyansky District, Belgorod Oblast, Russia. The population was 507 as of 2010. There are 3 streets.

== Geography ==
Novorechye is located 36 km northeast of Chernyanka (the district's administrative centre) by road. Baklanovka is the nearest rural locality.
