= Kubraki =

Kubraki Кубраки
- Selo
- Location within Belgorod Oblast Location within Russia
- Coordinates: 50°09′N 38°43′E
- Country: Russia
- Region: Belgorod Oblast
- District: Veydelevsky District
- Time zone: UTC+3:00

Kubraki (Russian: Кубраки) is a rural locality (a selo) and the administrative center of Kubrakovskoye Rural Settlement, Veydelevsky District, Belgorod Oblast, Russia. The population was 483 as of 2010. There are 11 streets.

== Geography ==
Kubraki is located 24 km east of Veydelevka (the district's administrative centre) by road. Popasny is the nearest rural locality.
