= Okuni, Belgorod Oblast =

Okuni Окуни
- Selo
- Location within Belgorod Oblast Location within Russia
- Coordinates: 51°01′N 37°51′E
- Country: Russia
- Region: Belgorod Oblast
- District: Chernyansky District
- Time zone: UTC+3:00

Okuni (Russian: Окуни) is a rural locality (a selo) in Chernyansky District, Belgorod Oblast, Russia. The population was 328 as of 2010. There are 8 streets.

== Geography ==
Okuni is located 11 km north of Chernyanka (the district's administrative centre) by road. Volokonovka is the nearest rural locality.
