= Zenino =

Zenino Зенино
- Selo
- Location within Belgorod Oblast Location within Russia
- Coordinates: 50°10′N 38°17′E
- Country: Russia
- Region: Belgorod Oblast
- District: Veydelevsky District
- Time zone: UTC+3:00

Zenino (Russian: Зенино) is a rural locality (a selo) and the administrative center of Zeninskoye Rural Settlement, Veydelevsky District, Belgorod Oblast, Russia. The population was 582 as of 2010. There are 11 streets.

== Geography ==
Zenino is located 15 km northwest of Veydelevka (the district's administrative centre) by road. Kandabarovo is the nearest rural locality.
