= Dolbino =

Dolbino Долбино
- Selo
- Location within Belgorod Oblast Location within Russia
- Coordinates: 50°30′N 36°24′E
- Country: Russia
- Region: Belgorod Oblast
- District: Belgorodsky District
- Time zone: UTC+3:00

Dolbino (Russian: Долбино) is a rural locality (a selo) in Belgorodsky District, Belgorod Oblast, Russia. The population was 516 as of 2010. There are 11 streets.

== Geography ==
Dolbino is located 4 km southwest of Maysky (the district's administrative centre) by road. Vesyolaya Lopan is the nearest rural locality.
