= Nekhayevka =

Nekhayevka Нехаевка
- Khutor
- Location within Belgorod Oblast Location within Russia
- Coordinates: 50°12′N 38°20′E
- Country: Russia
- Region: Belgorod Oblast
- District: Veydelevsky District
- Time zone: UTC+3:00

Nekhayevka (Russian: Нехаевка) is a rural locality (a khutor) and the administrative center of Klimenkovskoye Rural Settlement, Veydelevsky District, Belgorod Oblast, Russia. The population was 153 as of 2010. There are 4 streets.

== Geography ==
Nekhayevka is located 11 km northwest of Veydelevka (the district's administrative centre) by road. Roshchino is the nearest rural locality.
