= Belovsky =

Belovsky (masculine), Belovskaya (feminine), or Belovskoye (neuter) may refer to:

- Belovsky District, name of several districts in Russia
- Belovsky Urban Okrug, a municipal formation, which the town of Belovo, Kemerovo Oblast, is incorporated as
- Belovsky (rural locality) (Belovskaya, Belovskoye), name of several rural localities in Russia
