= Volokonovka, Chernyansky District, Belgorod Oblast =

Volokonovka Волоконовка
- Selo
- Location within Belgorod Oblast Location within Russia
- Coordinates: 51°02′N 37°51′E
- Country: Russia
- Region: Belgorod Oblast
- District: Chernyansky District
- Time zone: UTC+3:00

Volokonovka (Russian: Волоконовка) is a rural locality (a selo) and the administrative center of Volokonovskoye Rural Settlement, Chernyansky District, Belgorod Oblast, Russia. The population was 613 as of 2010. There are 11 streets.

== Geography ==
Volokonovka is located 15 km north of Chernyanka (the district's administrative centre) by road. Zavalishcheno is the nearest rural locality.
