= Belomestnoye =

Belomestnoye Беломестное
- Selo
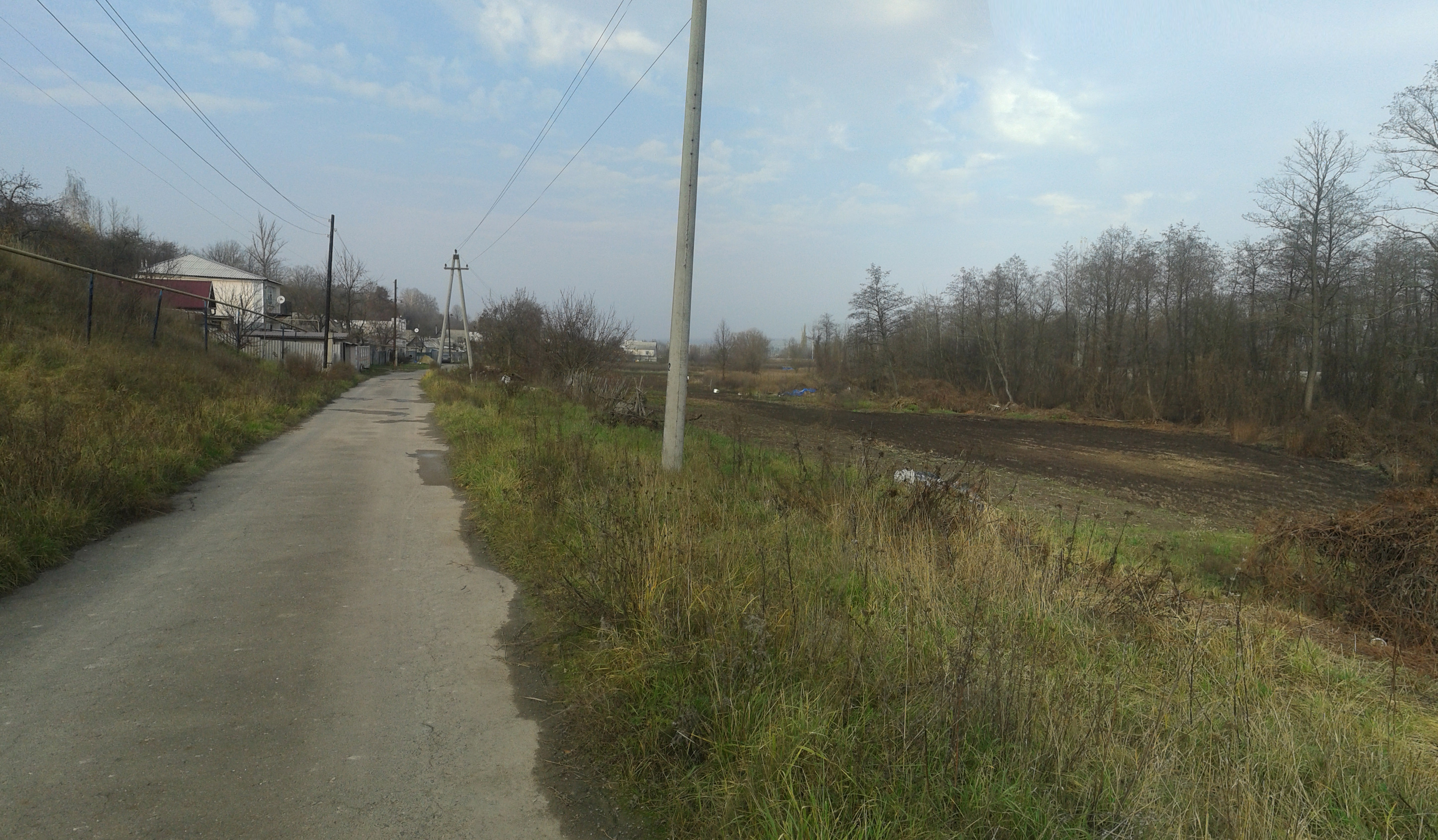

- Location within Belgorod Oblast Location within Russia
- Coordinates: 50°40′N 36°38′E
- Country: Russia
- Region: Belgorod Oblast
- District: Belgorodsky District
- Time zone: UTC+3:00
- Postal code: 308570

Belomestnoye (Russian: Беломестное) is a rural locality (a selo) and the administrative center of Belomestnenskoye Rural Settlement, Belgorodsky District, Belgorod Oblast, Russia. The population was 1,210 as of 2010. There are 39 streets.

== Geography ==
Belomestnoye is located 27 km northeast of Maysky (the district's administrative centre) by road. Shishino is the nearest rural locality.
