= Gulch Hvoschevataya =

Protected area in Belgorod, Russia

Gulch Hvoschevataya is a protected area, botanical reserve of regional importance on the territory of Krasnensky District, Belgorod Oblast.

== Geographical position ==
The total area of the reserve is 11 hectares (27 acres). It is located in Krasnensky District of the Belgorod region, on the territory of rural settlement Raskhovets. The reserve is located within the beam of the same name. It is a left spur of the beam, which stretches from east to west between the villages and Rashovets hop and opens into the valley of the river Kamyshenko. From the first village on the reserve deleted 1.5 kilometres (0.93 mi) in a northeasterly direction, and the second - by 1.8 kilometres (1.1 mi) in the north-west. The north side of the reserve is adjacent to the forest of Hvoschevoye.

== Vegetation ==
Within the reserve the vegetation is represented by motley-feather grass steppe. Along the perimeter of reserve surrounded by fields where crops are grown. Arable land covers a protected area from the east and the west, and from the south. That is, the mouth plowed beams. Horsetail tract north of the reserve is bayrak (gully) forest.

== History of formation ==
For the first time the status of specially protected area Hvoschevataya first received in 1991. Then the decision of the executive committee of Belgorod Oblast Council of People's Deputies in its territory botanical reserve was created. The reason for arming was of rare species of plants, including stipa. Later, the status of the reserve was confirmed in 1995 and in 2016 the provisions of the Head of Administration and the Government of the Belgorod region.
