= Rudny, Belgorod Oblast =

Rudny Рудный
- Settlement
- Location within Belgorod Oblast Location within Russia
- Coordinates: 50°46′N 37°53′E
- Country: Russia
- Region: Belgorod Oblast
- District: Novooskolsky District
- Time zone: UTC+3:00

Rudny (Russian: Рудный) is a rural locality (a settlement) in Novooskolsky District, Belgorod Oblast, Russia. The population was 429 as of 2010.

== Geography ==
Rudny is located 5 km northeast of Novy Oskol (the district's administrative centre) by road. Novy Oskol is the nearest rural locality.
