= Rovenki =

Rovenki may refer to:

- Rovenky (Rovenki), a city in Ukraine
- Rovenki, Russia, a work settlement in Rovensky District of Belgorod Oblast, Russia
