= Bolshoy Log =

Protected area in Belgorod, Russia

- Location within Russia
- Location: Belgorod Oblast
- Nearest city: Rossosh
- Coordinates: 50°59′34″N 38°46′24″E
- Area: 70 hectares (173 acres; 0 sq mi)

Bolshoy Log is a botanical reserve of regional importance in Krasnensky District of the Belgorod Oblast.

== Vegetation ==
Most of the reserve is covered with steppe vegetation. On the right, the eastern slope of the ravine contains numerous outcrops of chalk, which are covered by the "lowered alpine" vegetation (alpine postglacial relicts). Two species from the Red Book of Russia — Androsace koso-poljanskii and Hedysarum grandiflorum — were discovered there. In the upper part of the ravine there are two small gully forests.

== Environmental significance ==
In 2012 Bolshoy Log was included in the Emerald Network of prospective areas of the Europe in Belgorod Oblast.
