= Yerik, Belgorod Oblast =

Yerik Ерик
- Selo
- Location within Belgorod Oblast Location within Russia
- Coordinates: 50°43′N 36°30′E
- Country: Russia
- Region: Belgorod Oblast
- District: Belgorodsky District
- Time zone: UTC+3:00

Yerik (Russian: Ерик) is a rural locality (a selo) and the administrative center of Yerikovskoye Rural Settlement, Belgorodsky District, Belgorod Oblast, Russia. The population was 559 as of 2010. There are 65 streets.

== Geography ==
Yerik is located 28 km north of Maysky (the district's administrative centre) by road. Gonki is the nearest rural locality.
