= Komsomolsky, Belgorodsky District, Belgorod Oblast =

Komsomolsky Комсомольский
- Settlement
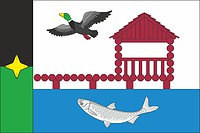
- Flag

- Location within Belgorod Oblast Location within Russia
- Coordinates: 50°33′N 36°25′E
- Country: Russia
- Region: Belgorod Oblast
- District: Belgorodsky District
- Time zone: UTC+3:00

Komsomolsky (Russian: Комсомольский) is a rural locality (a settlement) and the administrative center of Komsomolskoye Rural Settlement, Belgorodsky District, Belgorod Oblast, Russia. Population: 4,379 (2021 census); 2,201 (2010 census); There are 78 streets.

== Geography ==
Komsomolsky is located 9 km north of Maysky (the district's administrative centre) by road. Streletskoye 72 is the nearest rural locality.
