= Belgorodsky =

Belgorodsky (masculine), Belgorodskaya (feminine), or Belgorodskoye (neuter) may refer to:

- Belgorodsky District, a district of Belgorod Oblast, Russia
- Belgorodsky (rural locality), a rural locality (a settlement) in Tula Oblast, Russia
- Belgorod Oblast (Belgorodskaya oblast), a federal subject of Russia
- Belgorodskoye, a rural locality (a selo) in the Jewish Autonomous Oblast, Russia
