= Belovsky District =

Location of Kemerovo Oblast in Russia

Location of Kursk Oblast in Russia

Belovsky District is the name of several administrative and municipal districts in Russia.

- Belovsky District, Kemerovo Oblast, an administrative and municipal district of Kemerovo Oblast
- Belovsky District, Kursk Oblast, an administrative and municipal district of Kursk Oblast

== See also ==
- Belovsky (disambiguation)
