= Belovskoye, Belgorod Oblast =

Belovskoye Беловское
- Selo
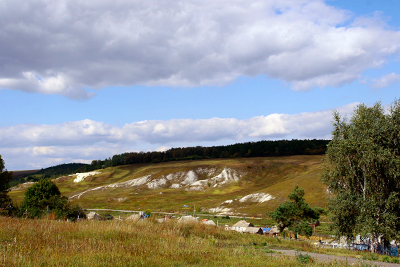

- Location within Belgorod Oblast Location within Russia
- Coordinates: 50°34′N 36°44′E
- Country: Russia
- Region: Belgorod Oblast
- District: Belgorodsky District
- Time zone: UTC+3:00
- Postal code: 308517

Belovskoye (Russian: Беловское) is a rural locality (a selo) and the administrative center of Belovskoye Rural Settlement, Belgorodsky District, Belgorod Oblast, Russia. Population: 3,141 (2021 census); 2,040 (2010 census); There are 34 streets.

== Geography ==
Belovskoye is located 26 km northeast of Maysky (the district's administrative centre) by road. Razumnoye-71 is the nearest rural locality.
