= Andrei Skoch =

Russian billionaire businessman

- Андрей Скоч
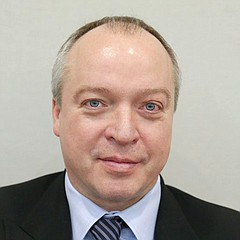
- Skoch in 2018

Member of the State Duma for Belgorod Oblast
- Incumbent
- Assumed office 5 October 2016
- Preceded by: constituency re-established
- In office 18 January 2000 – 24 December 2007
- Preceded by: Oleg Kuleshov
- Succeeded by: constituencies abolished
- Constituency: Stary Oskol (No. 76)

Member of the State Duma (Party List Seat)
- In office 24 December 2007 – 5 October 2016

Personal details
- Born: 30 January 1966 (age 60) Nikolskoye, Balashikhinsky District, Moscow Oblast, Russian SFSR, USSR
- Party: United Russia
- Spouse: Married
- Children: 10
- Education: Institute of Physical Culture; Sholokhov Moscow State University for Humanities
- Occupation: Businessman
- Known for: Part owner of Lebedinsky Mining, Co-Founder of USM Holdings
- Awards: Order of Alexander Nevsky; Order of Honour
- Networth: ▲US$6.33 billion (February 2021)

Andrei Vladimirovich Skoch (Russian: Андрей Владимирович Скоч, born 30 January 1966) is a Russian billionaire businessman, part owner of the steelmaker Lebedinsky Mining. According to Forbes, Skoch is among the richest Russians and was listed in The World's Billionaires in 2012. Skoch is a member of the State Duma of the Russian Federation since 1999.

== Early life ==
He was born on 30 January 1966, in the village of Nikolskoye, Moscow region. He served in the Soviet Army in 1984.

He was educated at the Institute of Physical Culture and wrote his dissertation there. In 1998, he graduated from the Moscow State University for Humanities named after M. A. Sholokhov (former Moscow State Open Pedagogical University (MSOPU)), Faculty of Psychology.

== Career ==
In the late 1980s, he went into business and opened a bakery with Lev Kvetnoi. After that, he sold computer components and owned fuel distribution companies. He held the post of Deputy General Director at "Kuznetsov and Partners LLC".

In 1995, he joined the capital and became Deputy General Director of the investment company "Interfin".

He worked for MontazhSpetsBank before joining fellow billionaire Alisher Usmanov in the metals business.

Skoch met Usmanov in 1995, while he was working as an oil trader for the bank. Together with Lev Kvetnoi, and Skoch, Usmanov's first purchases were the Lebedinsky Mining and a steel production plant in Belgorod.

In 1999, Skoch became Deputy General at JSC Lebedinsky GOK.

Usmanov formed the Metalloinvest conglomerate in 2006 after the acquisition of Mikhailovsky GOK. The merge included Lebedinsky Mining, and Skoch continues to be a partner in the company. Skoch owns 30% of Metalloinvest, though the shares are reportedly held in his father Vladimir's name.

In 2016, a list of members of parliament whose names appeared in the Panama Papers was published. Among them was also Skoch.

In April 2018, the United States imposed sanctions on him and 23 other Russian nationals.

=== Political career ===
In 1999, Skoch became deputy of the State Duma of the third convocation from the Belgorod region. In 2000, he took the post of the Chairman of the Expert Council on Metallurgy and the Mining Industry. In the same year, he defended his thesis entitled "Charity in Russia as a means of social protection of childhood".

In December 2003, he was elected a deputy of the State Duma of the IV convocation. In December 2007, he became a deputy of the State Duma of the V convocation in the list of candidates of United Russia. Since 2012, he has been a member of the inter-factional deputy group for the protection of Christian values.

In December 2011, he was elected a deputy of the State Duma of the VI convocation. In September 2016, became a deputy of the State Duma of the VII convocation.

From 1999 to 2019, during the term of office of the deputy of the State Duma of the III, IV, V, VI and VII convocations, he co-authored 163 legislative initiatives and amendments to draft federal laws.

In 2021, he was elected as a deputy of the State Duma of the Russian Federation, VIII convocation, representing the United Russia party from the single-mandate electoral district No. 76 (Belgorod region). He received 63.9% of the votes.

At the end of 2022, Andrey Skoch entered the top 130 most effective parliamentarians. The evaluation was based on a number of parameters, including public voting indices, activity in legislative work, and assessments of effectiveness by experts. In the 'Usefulness Coefficient' ranking, Skoch ranked 128th out of 450.

== Charity ==
In 2000, he established an independent literary award called "Debut," which existed until 2016.

Since 2005, Skoch regularly organizes a charitable International youth seminar «New Generation». As of 2022, the seminar was held 33 times.

He is a creator of the humanitarian Pokolenie ("Generation") Foundation. It supports cultural workers and scientists, families with three or more children, veterans of World War II, senior citizens and many others. The foundation also finances the construction of medical facilities in Belgorod Oblast and provides financial support for the reconstruction and restoration of military cemeteries.

In 2007, Skoch provided veterans of the Great Patriotic War from Belgorod region with personal VAZ-2105 (3000 vehicles for 260 million rubles).

In 2012, medical institutions of the Belgorod Region received 51 new ambulances from the Pokolenie ("Generation") Foundation. In the same year, the Foundation carried out the reconstruction of the cemetery of the Soviet Army servicemen in Szekesfehervar and the Soviet section of the Kerepesi Cemetery in Budapest (Hungary). During the reconstruction, more than a thousand soldiers of the 2nd and 3rd Ukrainian fronts were identified. A memorial was erected at the cemetery in Szekesfehervar.

In 2013, the Foundation presented VAZ-2104 to 180 large families from the Belgorod Region.

He has reportedly donated over $117 million, a portion of which was earmarked for the restoration of war monuments in Russia. Through the Pokolenie Foundation, Skoch is the sponsor of the Debut Prize, a literary award for Russian writers under the age of 25.

As of 2023, the charitable foundation has allocated over 15 billion rubles for the implementation of various projects.

== Controversies and sanctions ==
According to the U.S. Treasury Department, because Skoch has, alongside his role as deputy of Duma, long maintained ties to organized crime and for a time was alleged to have headed a criminal group himself, he was added to the sanctions list by the U.S. in the wake of sanctions against Russia along with other Russian oligarchs - all of whom are close to the Kremlin and therefore must share the consequences of their government's political actions.

In relation to the 2022 Russian invasion of Ukraine, on 23 February 2022, Skoch was added to the EU sanctions list, citing the following reason:

Member of the State Duma who voted in favour of the resolution No. 58243-8 "On the appeal of the State Duma of the Federal Assembly of the Russian Federation To the President of the Russian Federation V.V. Putin on the need to recognize the Donetsk People's Republic and the Luhansk People's Republic" and therefore supported and implemented actions and policies which undermine the territorial integrity, sovereignty and independence of Ukraine, and further destabilised Ukraine.

On 15 March 2022 Skoch was also added to the UK asset freeze and travel ban sanctions list "in respect of actions undermining or threatening the territorial integrity, sovereignty and independence of Ukraine".

== Personal life ==
Skoch is the father of ten children, four of whom are quadruplets born in 1994. He also has a daughter named Varvara. As of February 2022, he has a grandchild.

His father is Vladimir Nikitovich Skoch. He worked at the Salute engineering plant for several decades. He was awarded the Order of the Red Banner of Labour and the "Labour Veteran" medal.

After being elected a deputy of the State Duma, Andrei Skoch transferred his share in "Interfin" to his father, Vladimir Nikitovich Skoch. According to Forbes, in addition to 30% in USM, Vladimir Skoch also owns a share in Vnukovo Airport.

=== Wealth ===
According to Bloomberg, Skoch has a net worth of $6.3 billion, as of February 2021. According to the Forbes World's Billionaires List 2021, he ranked 288th on the list of the world's richest people, with a family estimated wealth of $8.6 billion.

| Year | 2011 | 2012 | 2013 | 2014 | 2015 | 2016 | 2017 | 2018 | 2019 | 2020 | 2021 | 2022 | 2023 |
| Net worth (in billion USD) | 3,9 | 4,2 | 7,9 | 8,2 | 5,7 | 5,3 | 6,9 | 4,9 | 5,2 | 6,3 | 8,8 | 4,7 | 7,9 |
| Rank (Russia) | 29 | 28 | 19 | 18 | 18 | 18 | 17 | 23 | 22 | 19 | 21 | 26 | 20 |

He also owns the £100 million yacht 'Madame Gu. He hired the British PR firm to go after the website that reported on his ownership of the yacht. He has reportedly donated over $117 million, a portion of which was earmarked for the restoration of war monuments in Russia.

== Honours ==
- Medal of the Order "For Merit to the Fatherland", Сlass 2 (14 November 1998) - for services in the field of social rehabilitation of disabled people, protection of their rights and interests.
- Medal of the Order "For Services to the Fatherland " of the first degree (13 February 2003) - for the achieved labor successes and many years of conscientious work.
- Gratitude of the President of the Russian Federation (21 October 2009) - for productive lawmaking and public activities.
- Order of Honour (13 December 2010) - for a great contribution to perpetuating the memory of Russian and Soviet soldiers who died on the territory of the People's Republic of China, and active charitable work.
- Order of Honour (South Ossetia, 29 May 2011) - for a great contribution to the development and strengthening of friendship and cooperation between peoples, active charitable activities and support provided to the people of the Republic of South Ossetia in the construction of socially significant facilities.
- Order of St. Alexander Nevsky (2016) - for the restoration of monuments and memorials to Russian and Soviet soldiers in the Belgorod Region, China and Hungary.
- Certificate of Merit of the Government of the Russian Federation (2019) - for great contribution to the development of Russian parliamentarism and active lawmaking based on the results of work in 2019.
- Order "For Merit to the Fatherland", Class 3 (November 2024) - for great contribution to strengthening parliamentarianism, active lawmaking and many years of conscientious work.

== See also ==
- List of Russian billionaires
