= Yakovlevo, Belgorod Oblast =

Urban locality in Belgorod Oblast, Russia

Coordinates: 50°51′57″N 36°26′49″E

Yakovlevo (Russian: Я́ковлево) is an urban-type settlement in Yakovlevsky District of Belgorod Oblast, Russia. Population: 2,675 (2021 census); 2,906 (2010 census); 2,596 (2002 census); 2,544 (1989 Soviet census).
