= Oktyabrsky, Belgorodsky District, Belgorod Oblast =

Urban locality in Belgorod Oblast, Russia

Oktyabrsky Откябрьский
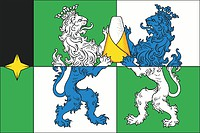
- Flag
- Interactive map of Oktyabrsky
- Location of Oktyabrsky Oktyabrsky (European Russia) Oktyabrsky (Russia)
- Coordinates: 50°26′15″N 36°21′35″E
- Country: Russia
- Federal subject: Belgorod Oblast
- Founded: 1846
- Elevation: 189 m (620 ft)

Population
  - Estimate (1 January 2023): 8,471 )
- Time zone: UTC+3 (MSK)
- Postal codes: 308950, 308590
- OKTMO ID: 14610160051

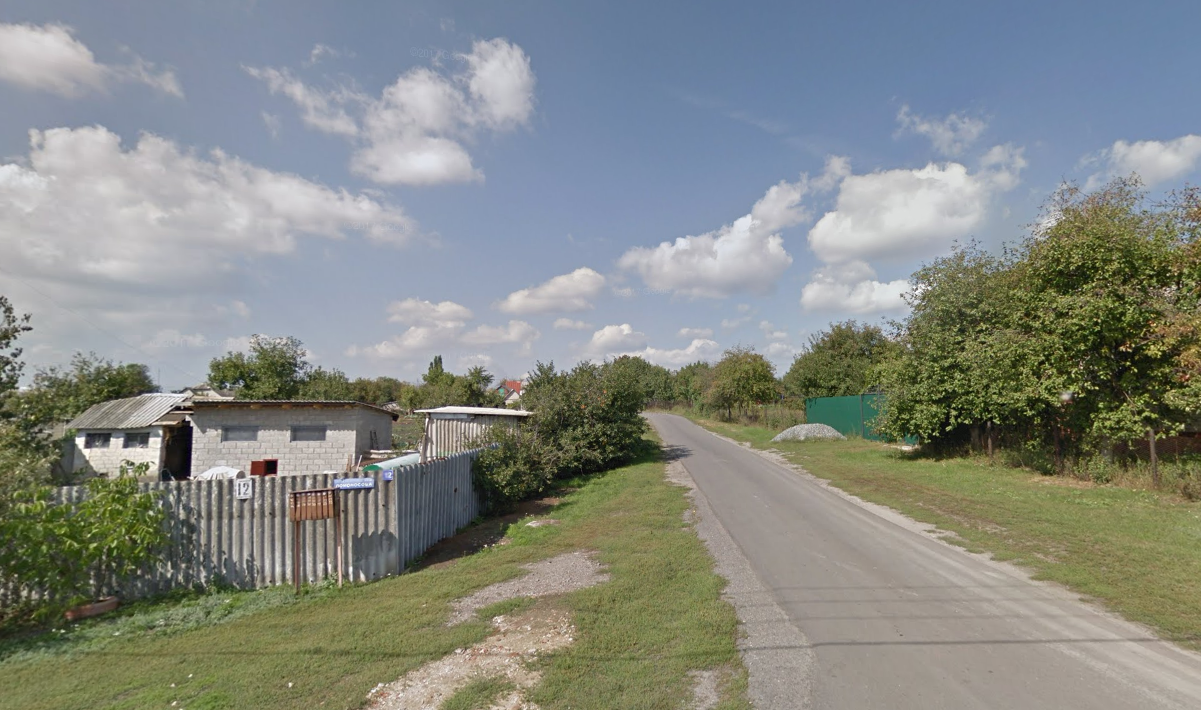
Oktyabrsky

Oktyabrsky (Russian: Октя́брьский) is an urban-type settlement in Belgorodsky District of Belgorod Oblast, Russia.

== Demographics ==
Oktyabrsky has reported populations of 8,785 (2021 census); 7,456 (2010 census); 6,899 (2002 census); 6,421 (1989 Soviet census).

== History ==
The settlement was reported to have been the scene of fighting during the March 2024 western Russia incursion.
