= Severny, Belgorod Oblast =

Urban locality in Belgorod Oblast, Russia

Coordinates: 50°40′33″N 36°33′32″E

Severny (Russian: Се́верный) is an urban-type settlement in Belgorodsky District of Belgorod Oblast, Russia. Population: 24,070 (2021 census); 9,847 (2010 census); 7,654 (2002 census); 3,678 (1989 Soviet census).
