= Volokonovka, Voronezh Oblast =

Volokonovka Волоконовка
- Selo
- Location within Voronezh Oblast Location within Russia
- Coordinates: 49°50′N 39°23′E
- Country: Russia
- Region: Voronezh Oblast
- District: Kantemirovsky District
- Time zone: UTC+3:00

Volokonovka (Russian: Волоконовка) is a rural locality (a selo) in Bondarevskoye Rural Settlement, Kantemirovsky District, Voronezh Oblast, Russia. The population was 638 as of 2010. There are 11 streets.

== Geography ==
Volokonovka is located 54 km northwest of Kantemirovka (the district's administrative centre) by road. Novobelaya is the nearest rural locality.
