= Belovskoye, Ivanovo Oblast =

Belovskoye Беловское
- Village
- Location within Ivanovo Oblast Location within Russia
- Coordinates: 57°11′N 41°32′E
- Country: Russia
- Region: Ivanovo Oblast
- District: Rodnikovsky District
- Time zone: UTC+3:00

Belovskoye (Russian: Беловское) is a rural locality (a village) in Rodnikovsky District, Ivanovo Oblast, Russia. Population: 7 (2010 census);

== Geography ==
This rural locality is located 14 kilometres (8.7 mi) from Rodniki (the district's administrative centre), 41 kilometres (25 mi) from Ivanovo (capital of Ivanovo Oblast) and 285 kilometres (177 mi) from Moscow. Mokeyevo is the nearest rural locality.
