= Stroitel, Belgorod Oblast =

Town in Belgorod Oblast, Russia

Stroitel Строитель
- Town
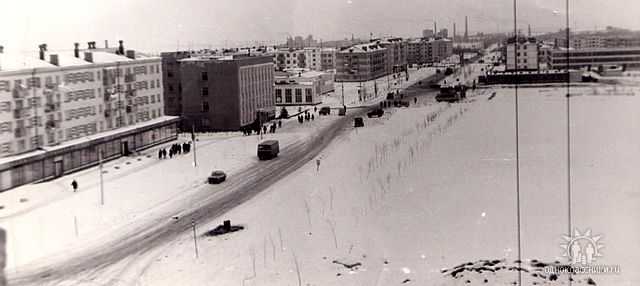
- Stroitel, January 1989
- Interactive map of Stroitel
- Location of Stroitel Stroitel (Belgorod Oblast)
- Coordinates: 50°47′N 36°29′E
- Country: Russia
- Federal subject: Belgorod Oblast
- Administrative district: Yakovlevsky District
- Founded: 1958
- Town status since: 2000
- Elevation: 220 m (720 ft)

Population (2010 Census)
  - Total: 23,933
  - Estimate (2021): 23,780 (−0.6%)

Administrative status
  - Capital of: Yakovlevsky District

Municipal status
  - Municipal district: Yakovlevsky Municipal District
  - Urban settlement: Stroitel Urban Settlement
  - Capital of: Yakovlevsky Municipal District, Stroitel Urban Settlement
- Time zone: UTC+3 (MSK)
- Postal code: 309070
- OKTMO ID: 14658101001

Stroitel (Russian: Строи́тель, lit. builder) is a town and the administrative center of Yakovlevsky District in Belgorod Oblast, Russia, located near the Vorskla River (an arm of the Dnieper), 21 kilometers (13 mi) from Belgorod, the administrative center of the oblast. Population: 23,780 (2021 census); 23,933 (2010 census); 18,400 (2002 census); 14,271 (1989 Soviet census).

== History ==
Stroitel was founded in 1958 due to the then-planned construction of the Yakovlevsky mine. It was granted urban-type settlement status in 1960 and town status in 2000.

== Administrative and municipal status ==
Within the framework of administrative divisions, Stroitel serves as the administrative center of Yakovlevsky District, to which it is directly subordinated. As a municipal division, the town of Stroitel, together with three rural localities in Yakovlevsky District, is incorporated within Yakovlevsky Municipal District as Stroitel Urban Settlement.
