= Yerik, Volgograd Oblast =

Yerik Ерик
- Khutor
- Location within Volgograd Oblast Location within Russia
- Coordinates: 48°58′N 43°05′E
- Country: Russia
- Region: Volgograd Oblast
- District: Kletsky District
- Time zone: UTC+4:00

Yerik (Russian: Ерик) is a rural locality (a khutor) in Verkhnebuzinovskoye Rural Settlement, Kletsky District, Volgograd Oblast, Russia. The population was 80 as of 2010.

== Geography ==
Yerik is located on the bank of the Bystry Yerik, 56 km south of Kletskaya (the district's administrative centre) by road. Mayorovsky is the nearest rural locality.
