= Krasnoye, Krasnensky District, Belgorod Oblast =

Rural locality in Belgorod Oblast, Russia

Krasnoye Красное
- Selo
- Flag Coat of arms
- Interactive map of Krasnoye
- Location of Krasnoye Krasnoye (Belgorod Oblast)
- Coordinates: 50°56′01″N 38°40′50″E
- Country: Russia
- Federal subject: Belgorod Oblast
- Administrative district: Krasnensky District
- SelsovietSelsoviet: Krasnensky

Population (2010 Census)
  - Total: 2,158
  - Estimate (2010): 2,158 (0%)

Administrative status
  - Capital of: Krasnensky District, Krasnenskoye Selsoviet

Municipal status
  - Municipal district: Krasnensky Municipal District
  - Capital of: Krasnensky Municipal District, Krasnenskoye Selsoviet Rural Settlement
- Time zone: UTC+3 (MSK)
- Postal code: 309870
- Dialing code: +7 47262
- OKTMO ID: 14641478101

Krasnoye (Russian: Крáсное) is a rural locality (a selo) and the administrative center of Krasnensky District of Belgorod Oblast, Russia. Population: 2,158 (2010 census); 2,322 (2002 census);
