= Novy Oskol =

Town in Belgorod Oblast, Russia

Novy Oskol Новый Оскол
- Town
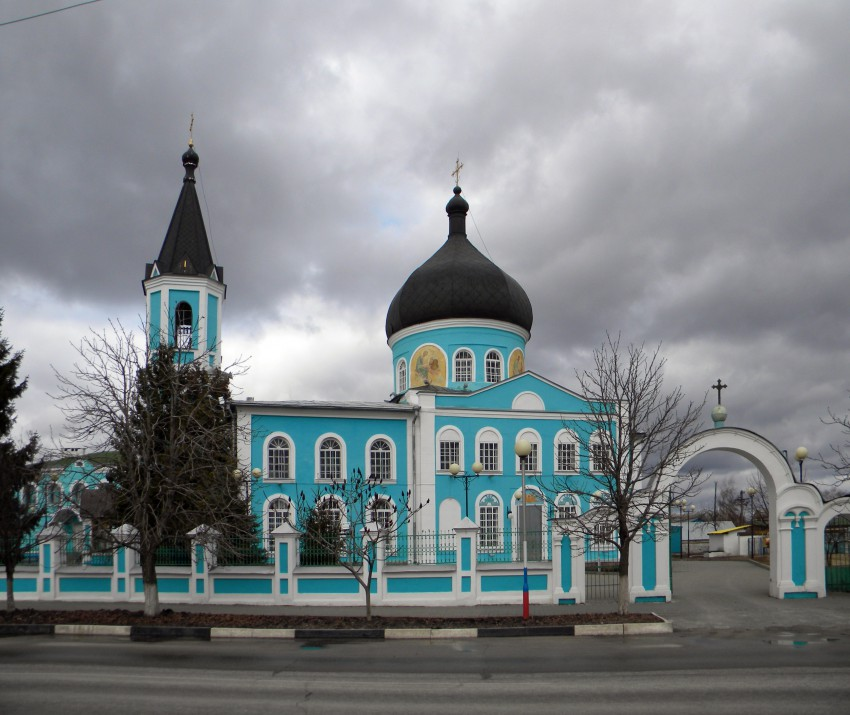
- Uspenovsky Cathedral of the Assumption.

- Flag Coat of arms
- Interactive map of Novy Oskol
- Location of Novy Oskol Novy Oskol (Belgorod Oblast)
- Coordinates: 50°45′30″N 37°52′25″E
- Country: Russia
- Federal subject: Belgorod Oblast
- Administrative district: Novooskolsky District
- Founded: 1647
- Elevation: 110 m (360 ft)

Population (2010 Census)
  - Total: 19,530
  - Estimate (2021): 18,359 (−6%)

Administrative status
  - Capital of: Novooskolsky District

Municipal status
  - Municipal district: Novooskolsky Municipal District
  - Urban settlement: Novy Oskol Urban Settlement
  - Capital of: Novooskolsky Municipal District, Novy Oskol Urban Settlement
- Time zone: UTC+3 (MSK)
- Postal code: 309640
- OKTMO ID: 14644101001

Novy Oskol (Russian: Но́вый Оско́л) is a town and the administrative center of Novooskolsky District in Belgorod Oblast, Russia, 90 kilometers (56 mi) northeast of Belgorod, the administrative center of the oblast. Population: 18,359 (2021 census); 19,530 (2010 census); 20,892 (2002 census); 20,072 (1989 Soviet census). It is called Novy Oskol (lit. 'New Oskol') to distinguish it from Stary Oskol (lit. 'Old Oskol') located 60 kilometres (37 mi) north. Both are on the south-flowing Oskol River.

== History ==
It was near the Muravsky Trail used by Crimeans and Nogais to raid Muscovy. In 1637 it was founded as a fort. In 1647 it became a city with the name Tsaryov-Alekseev after Tsar Alexis of Russia. In 1655 it was named Novy Oskol to distinguish it from Stary Oskol (Old Oskol) to the north.

== Administrative and municipal status ==
Within the framework of administrative divisions, Novy Oskol serves as the administrative center of Novooskolsky District, to which it is directly subordinated. As a municipal division, the town of Novy Oskol, together with the settlement of Rudny in Novooskolsky District, is incorporated within Novooskolsky Municipal District as Novy Oskol Urban Settlement.
