= Ivnyansky District =

Ivnyansky District Ивнянский район (Russian)
- District
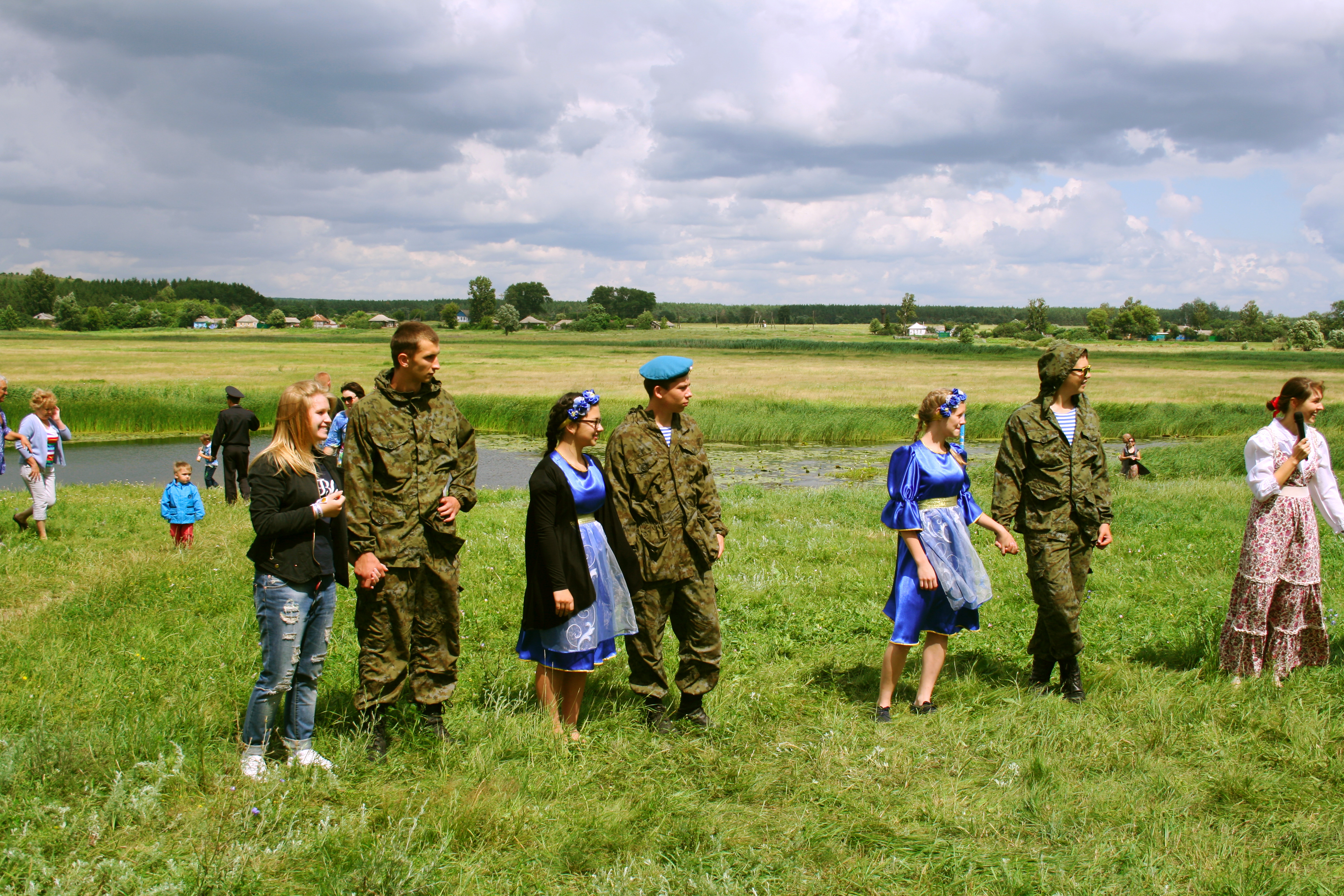
- Festival "Homutchanskaya Valley Masters" 2015, village (selo) Samarino, Ivnyansky District

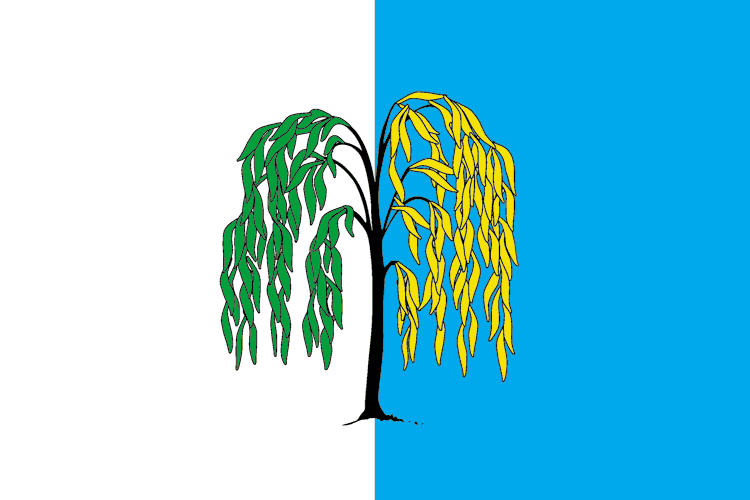
- Flag Coat of arms
- Location of Ivnyansky District in Belgorod Oblast
- Coordinates: 51°03′35″N 36°08′07″E
- Country: Russia
- Federal subject: Belgorod Oblast
- Established: 1928
- Administrative center: Ivnya

Area
  - Total: 871.1 km^{2} (336.3 sq mi)

Population (2010 Census)
  - Total: 23,570
  - Estimate (2015): 22,531
  - Density: 27.06/km^{2} (70.08/sq mi)
  - Urban: 33.7%
  - Rural: 66.3%

Administrative structure
  - Inhabited localities: 1 urban-type settlements, 39 rural localities

Municipal structure
  - Municipally incorporated as: Ivnyansky Municipal District
  - Municipal divisions: 1 urban settlements, 13 rural settlements
- Time zone: UTC+3 (MSK)
- OKTMO ID: 14638000
- Website: http://admivnya.ru/

Ivnyansky District (Russian: И́внянский райо́н) is an administrative district (raion), one of the twenty-one in Belgorod Oblast, Russia. Municipally, it is incorporated as Ivnyansky Municipal District. It is located in the northwest of the oblast. The area of the district is 871.1 square kilometers (336.3 sq mi). Its administrative center is the urban locality (a settlement) of Ivnya. Population: 21,650 (2021 census); 23,570 (2010 census); 24,468 (2002 Census); 23,314 (1989 Soviet census). The population of Ivnya accounts for 33.0% of the district's total population.
