= Ivnya =

Rural locality in Belgorod Oblast, Russia

Ivnya Ивня
- Town
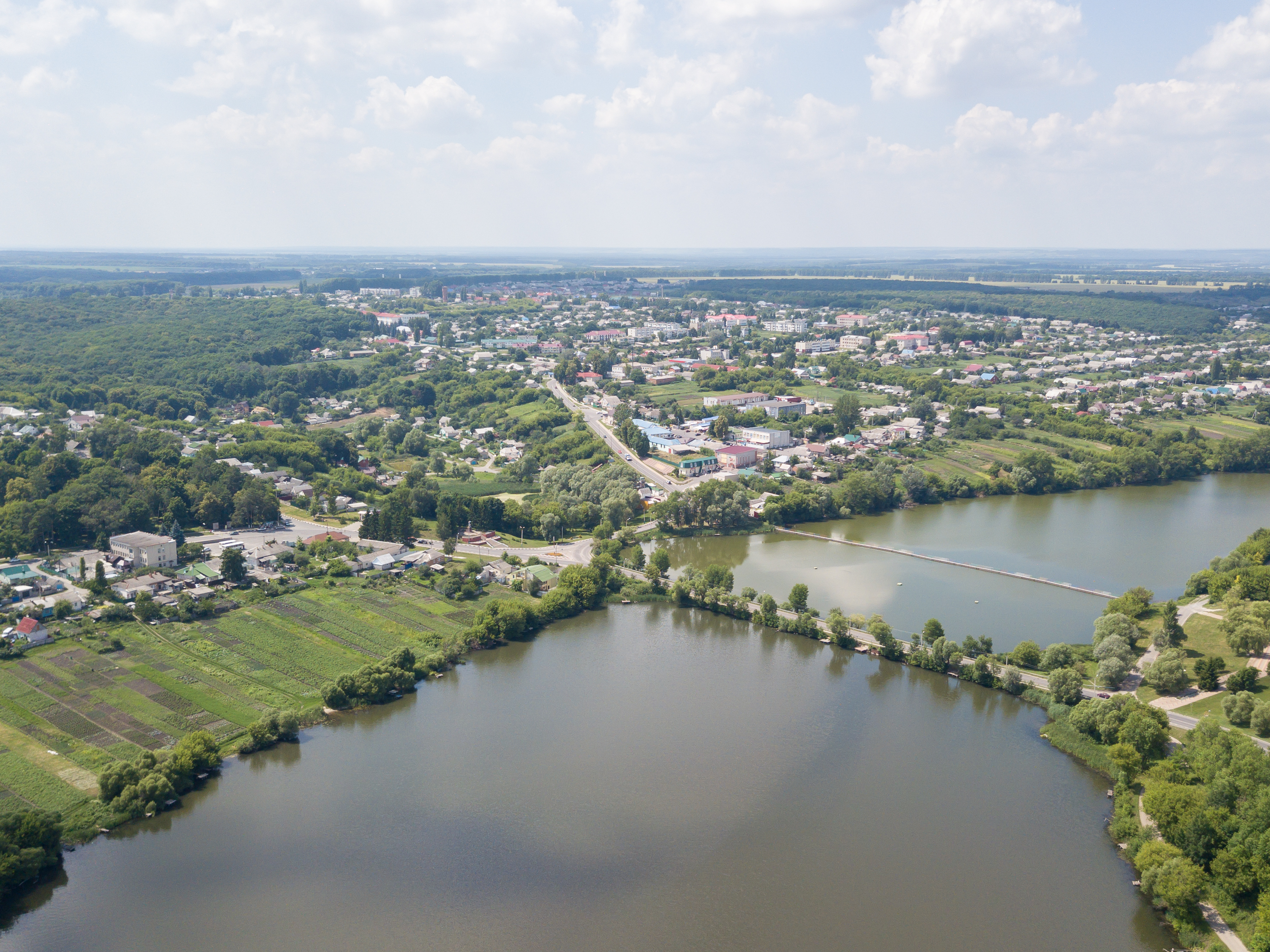

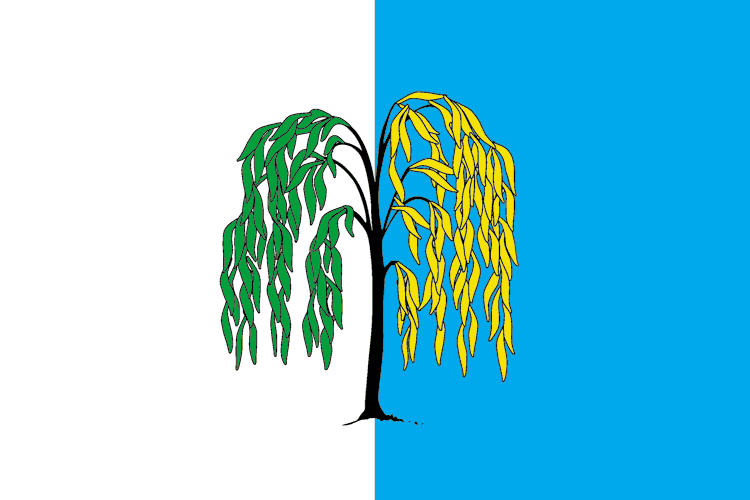
- Flag Coat of arms
- Interactive map of Ivnya
- Location of Ivnya Ivnya (Belgorod Oblast)
- Coordinates: 51°03′00″N 36°07′00″E
- Country: Russia
- Federal subject: Belgorod Oblast
- First mentioned: 1762
- Town status since: 1971
- Elevation: 216 m (709 ft)

Population
  - Estimate (2025): 6,793 )

Municipal status
  - Municipal district: Ivnyansky Municipal District
  - Urban settlement: Ivnyansky Urban Settlement
  - Capital of: Ivnyansky Municipal District, Ivnyansky Urban Settlement
- Time zone: UTC+3 (MSK)
- Postal codes: 309110, 309111
- Dialing code: +7 47243
- OKTMO ID: 14638151051

Ivnya (Russian: И́вня, IPA: [ˈivnʲə]) is an urban-type settlement and the administrative center of Ivnyansky District of Belgorod Oblast, Russia. Population: 7,134 (2021 census); 7,933 (2010 census); 7,725 (2002 census); 7,236 (1989 Soviet census).

The name of the settlement comes from the trees, willow, in Russian "Ivnya" which grew up in a multitude of lakes along the area.

== Geography ==
It located in the north-west part of the province, 57 kilometres (35 mi) from Belgorod. In the village there is a railway station "Ivnya", the end point of the railway line Gotnya - Ivnya. The village is located on both banks of the river Ivnya and several ponds, the largest of which is "Zavodsky".

== History ==
The first information about the populated area relate to 1720. The owner Ivni was originally a landlord, a retired major I. Pereverzev, who translated part of his yard peasants from Oboyan Uyezd and placed them in a new place.

By 1865, the village numbered 1733 people and 211 plots. In 1852 Ivnya - named after VN Karamzin, the son of Nikolay Karamzin. In 1879, after his death, the estate goes to the Count Konstanin Kleinmikhel. Since 1963, the children's tuberculosis sanatorium is located in a former manor of Kleinmichel. In 1928 it became the administrative center of Ivnyanski District. October 27, 1941, German troops occupied Ivnya and 20 February 1943 retreated.

Status of urban-type settlement was granted in 1971.
