= Rakityansky District =

Rakityansky District Ракитянский район (Russian)
- District
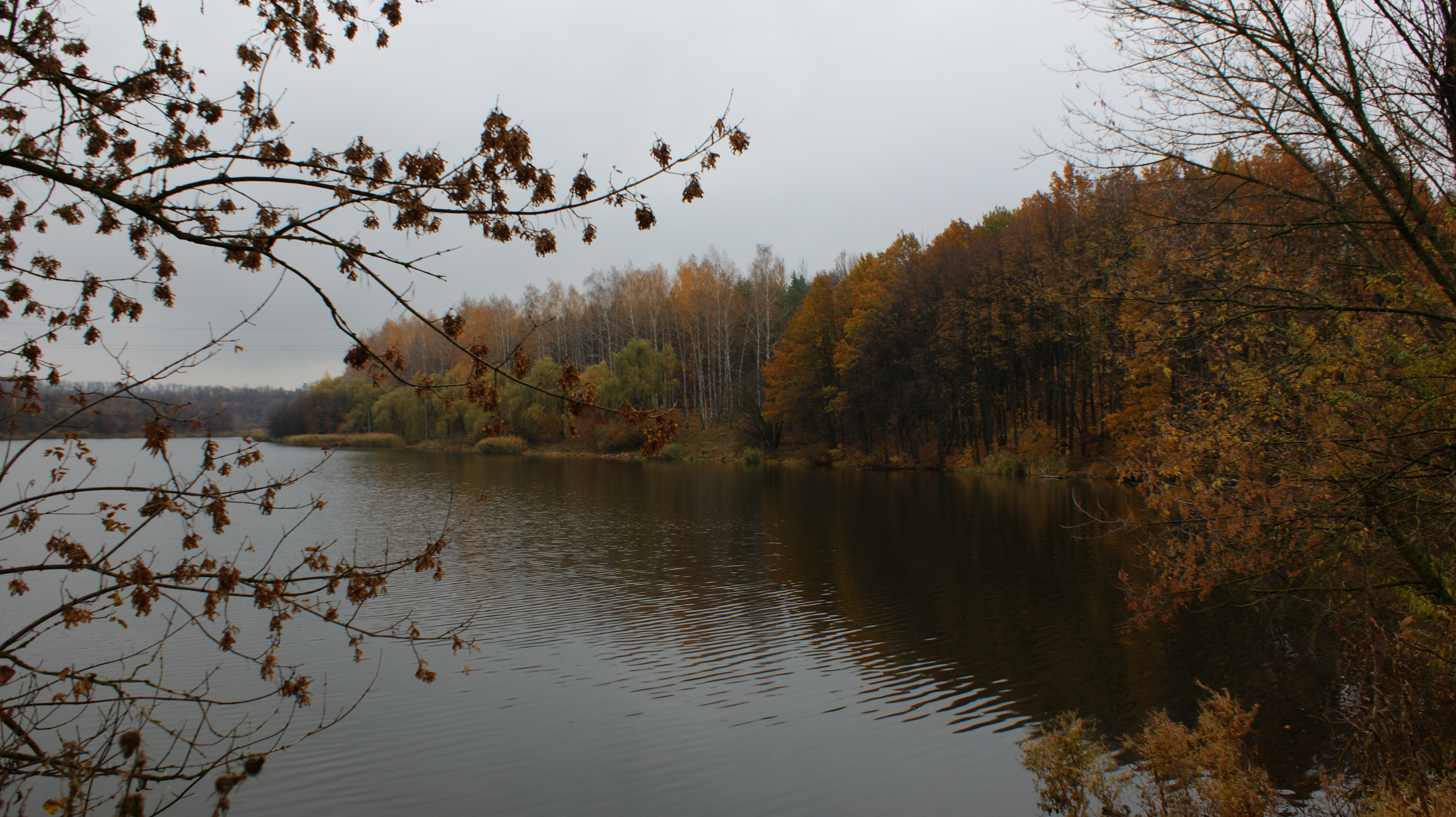
- Park in Rakityansky District

- Flag Coat of arms
- Location of Rakityansky District in Belgorod Oblast
- Coordinates: 50°50′N 35°49′E
- Country: Russia
- Federal subject: Belgorod Oblast
- Established: 30 July 1928
- Administrative center: Rakitnoye

Area
  - Total: 900.9 km^{2} (347.8 sq mi)

Population (2010 Census)
  - Total: 33,935
  - Density: 37.67/km^{2} (97.56/sq mi)
  - Urban: 55.8%
  - Rural: 44.2%

Administrative structure
  - Administrative divisions: 2 Settlement okrugs, 13 Rural okrugs
  - Inhabited localities: 2 urban-type settlements, 60 rural localities

Municipal structure
  - Municipally incorporated as: Rakityansky Municipal District
  - Municipal divisions: 2 urban settlements, 11 rural settlements
- Time zone: UTC+3 (MSK)
- OKTMO ID: 14648000
- Website: http://www.rakitnoeadm.ru/

Rakityansky District (Russian: Ракитя́нский райо́н) is an administrative district (raion), one of the twenty-one in Belgorod Oblast, Russia. As a municipal division, it is incorporated as Rakityansky Municipal District. It is located in the west of the oblast. The area of the district is 900.9 square kilometers (347.8 sq mi). Its administrative center is the urban locality (a work settlement) of Rakitnoye. Population: 33,284 (2021 census); 33,935 (2010 census); 35,031 (2002 Census); 49,580 (1989 Soviet census). The population of Rakitnoye accounts for 30.2% of the district's total population.
