= Yakovlevsky District, Belgorod Oblast =

Yakovlevsky District Яковлевский район (Russian)
- District
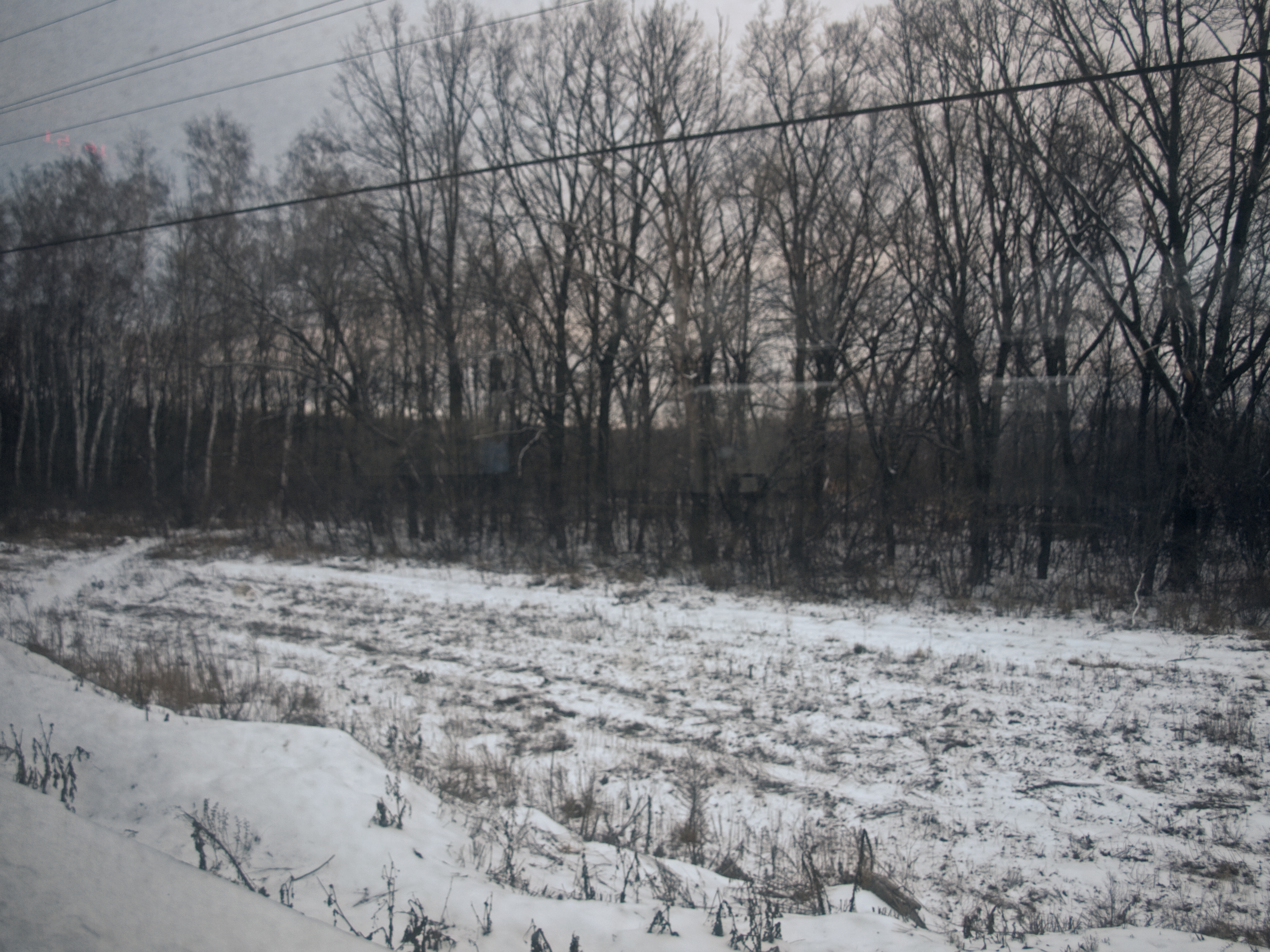
- Landscape at the railway station of Ozerovo in the east of the district

- Flag Coat of arms
- Location of Yakovlevsky District in Belgorod Oblast
- Coordinates: 50°47′N 36°29′E
- Country: Russia
- Federal subject: Belgorod Oblast
- Established: 12 January 1965
- Administrative center: Stroitel

Area
  - Total: 1,089 km^{2} (420 sq mi)

Population (2010 Census)
  - Total: 57,774
  - Density: 53.05/km^{2} (137.4/sq mi)
  - Urban: 60.5%
  - Rural: 39.5%

Administrative structure
  - Inhabited localities: 1 cities/towns, 2 urban-type settlements, 83 rural localities

Municipal structure
  - Municipally incorporated as: Yakovlevsky Municipal District
  - Municipal divisions: 3 urban settlements, 14 rural settlements
- Time zone: UTC+3 (MSK)
- OKTMO ID: 14658000
- Website: http://www.yakovl-adm.narod.ru/

Yakovlevsky District (Russian: Я́ковлевский райо́н) is an administrative district (raion), one of the twenty-one in Belgorod Oblast, Russia. As a municipal division, it is incorporated as Yakovlevsky Municipal District. It is located in the west of the oblast. The area of the district is 1,089 square kilometers (420 sq mi). Its administrative center is the town of Stroitel. Population: 57,774 (2010 census); 51,409 (2002 Census); 43,704 (1989 Soviet census). The population of Stroitel accounts for 41.4% of the district's total population.
