= Rakitnoye, Belgorod Oblast =

Rakitnoye Ракитное
- Town
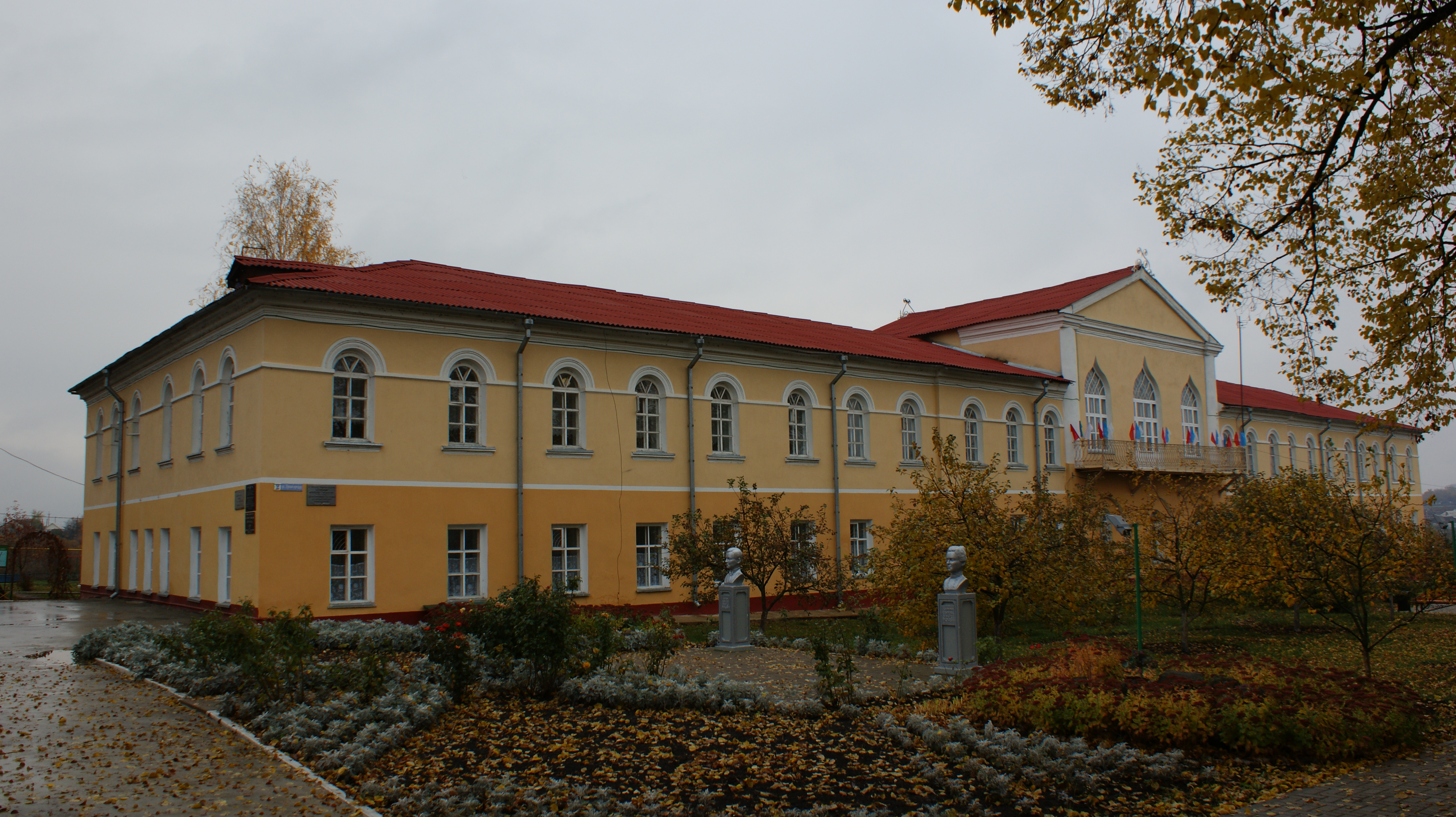
- Yusupov Manor House, Rakitnoye

- Coat of arms
- Interactive map of Rakitnoye
- Location of Rakitnoye Rakitnoye (Belgorod Oblast)
- Coordinates: 50°50′03″N 35°50′09″E
- Country: Russia
- Federal subject: Belgorod Oblast
- First mentioned: 1652
- Town status since: 1975

Population (2010 Census)
  - Total: 10,286
  - Estimate (1 January 2024): 10,046 (−2.3%)

Municipal status
  - Municipal district: Rakityansky Municipal District
  - Urban settlement: Rakityansky Urban Settlement
  - Capital of: Rakityansky Municipal District, Rakityansky Urban Settlement
- Time zone: UTC+3 (MSK)
- Postal code: 309310
- Dialing code: +7 47245
- OKTMO ID: 14648151051

Rakitnoye (Russian: Раки́тное) is an urban-type settlement in Belgorod Oblast, Russia and the administrative center of Rakityansky District and Rakitnoye urban settlement. Population: 10,048 (2021 census); 10,286 (2010 census); 10,462 (2002 census); 11,211 (1989 Soviet census).

Located on the banks of the Dnieper River, Rakitnoye Basin. Final railway station Zinaidino on a branch of Gotnya Railway Station. Passenger movement there.

== History ==
With the foundation settlement Rakitnoe (1652), called on the name of the same river, the surrounding land belonged to Kochubey's family, and, Alexander Danilovich Menshikov who was associate of Peter I. In 1728 the settlement was transferred to Prince Yusupov GD and until 1917 was the name of the Prince Yusupov control center in Kursk, Voronezh, Kharkov and Poltava governorates.

Status of urban-type settlements since 1975.

== Landmarks ==
From Yusupovs manor remained the main house which built in 1846 for Prince Boris Yusupov, and several auxiliary buildings, which now housed the School of Arts, History Museum. Another landmark, St. Nicholas Church in the town, was built in 1832.
