= Novooskolsky District =

Novooskolsky District Новооскольский район (Russian)
- District
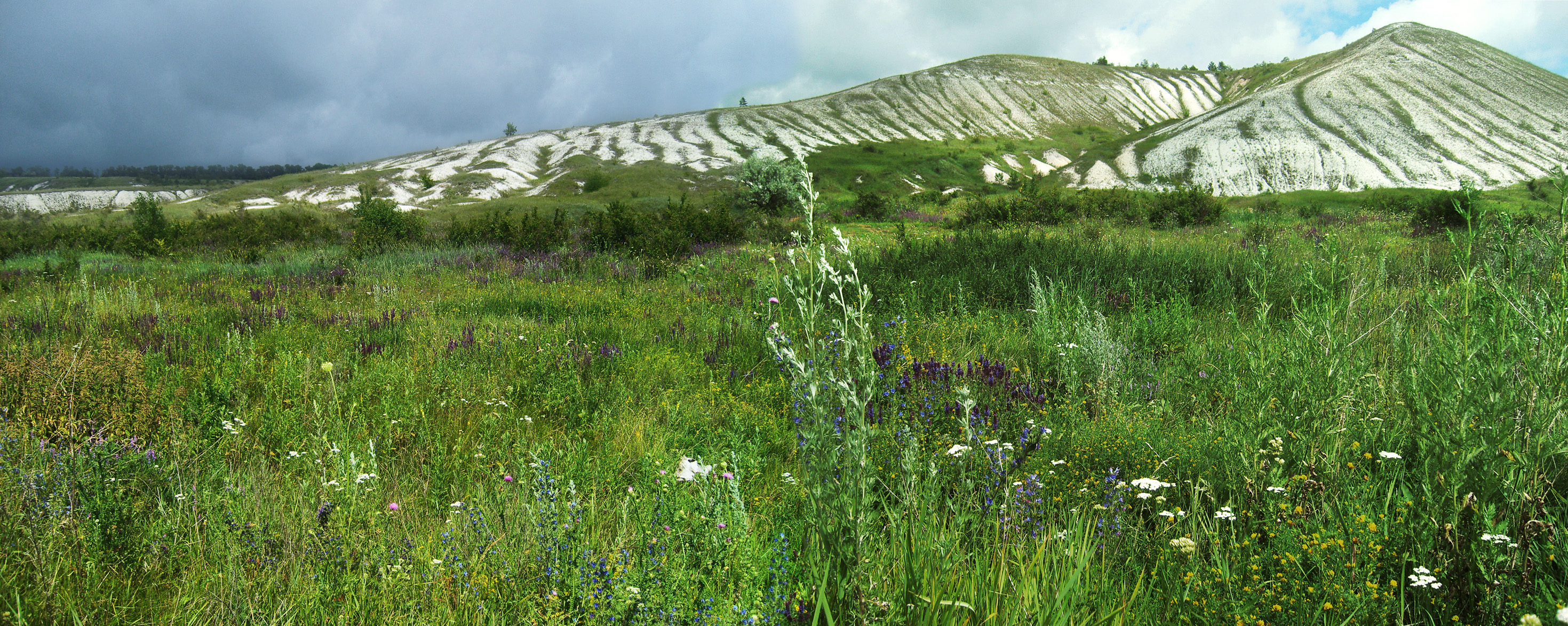
- Chalk slopes in Belogorye Nature Reserve, Novooskolsky District

- Flag Coat of arms
- Location of Novooskolsky District in Belgorod Oblast
- Coordinates: 50°46′N 37°52′E
- Country: Russia
- Federal subject: Belgorod Oblast
- Established: 30 July 1928
- Administrative center: Novy Oskol

Area
  - Total: 1,401 km^{2} (541 sq mi)

Population (2010 Census)
  - Total: 43,396
  - Density: 30.98/km^{2} (80.22/sq mi)
  - Urban: 45.0%
  - Rural: 55.0%

Administrative structure
  - Inhabited localities: 1 cities/towns, 105 rural localities

Municipal structure
  - Municipally incorporated as: Novooskolsky Municipal District
  - Municipal divisions: 1 urban settlements, 17 rural settlements
- Time zone: UTC+3 (MSK)
- OKTMO ID: 14644000
- Website: http://www.oskoladmin.ru/

Novooskolsky District (Russian: Новооско́льский райо́н) is an administrative district (raion), one of the twenty-one in Belgorod Oblast, Russia. Municipally, it is incorporated as Novooskolsky Municipal District. It is located in the center of the oblast. The area of the district is 1,401 square kilometers (541 sq mi). Its administrative center is the town of Novy Oskol. Population: 43,396 (2010 census); 47,380 (2002 Census); 46,669 (1989 Soviet census). The population of Novy Oskol accounts for 45.0% of the district's total population.
