= Krasnensky District =

Krasnensky District Красненский район
- District
- Flag Coat of arms
- Location of Krasnensky District in Belgorod Oblast
- Coordinates: 50°55′48″N 38°40′57″E
- Country: Russia
- Federal subject: Belgorod Oblast
- Established: February 1991
- Administrative center: Krasnoye

Area
  - Total: 851.9 km^{2} (328.9 sq mi)

Population (2010 Census)
  - Total: 13,371
  - Density: 15.70/km^{2} (40.65/sq mi)
  - Urban: 0%
  - Rural: 100%

Administrative structure
  - Administrative divisions: 10 rural okrug
  - Inhabited localities: 44 rural localities

Municipal structure
  - Municipally incorporated as: Krasnensky Municipal District
  - Municipal divisions: 0 urban settlements, 10 rural settlements
- Time zone: UTC+3 (MSK)
- OKTMO ID: 14641000
- Website: http://www.kraadm.ru/

Krasnensky District (Russian: Кра́сненский райо́н) is an administrative district (raion), one of the twenty-one in Belgorod Oblast, Russia. Municipally, it is incorporated as Krasnensky Municipal District. It is located in the northeast of the oblast. The area of the district is 851.9 square kilometers (328.9 sq mi). Its administrative center is the rural locality (a selo) of Krasnoye. Population: 11,358 (2021 Census); 13,371 (2010 Census); 15,337 (2002 Census). The population of Krasnoye accounts for 16.1% of the district's total population.

== History ==
The district was established in February 1991.
