= Rovensky District, Belgorod Oblast =

Rovensky District Ровеньский район (Russian)
- District
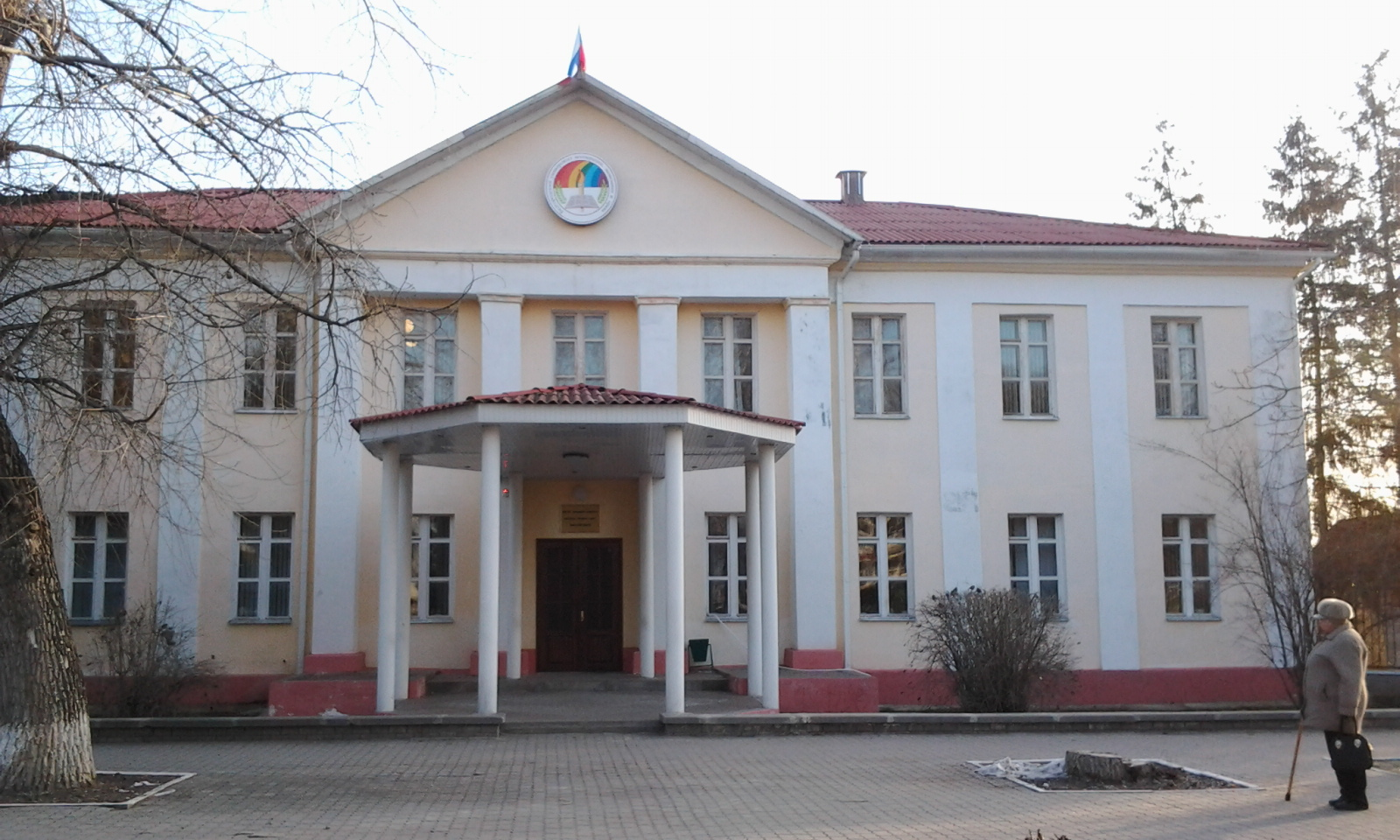
- Rovenki Settlement, Rovensky District

- Flag Coat of arms
- Location of Rovensky District in Belgorod Oblast
- Coordinates: 49°55′18″N 38°53′39″E
- Country: Russia
- Federal subject: Belgorod Oblast
- Established: 30 July 1928
- Administrative center: Rovenki

Area
  - Total: 1,369 km^{2} (529 sq mi)

Population (2010 Census)
  - Total: 24,060
  - Density: 17.57/km^{2} (45.52/sq mi)
  - Urban: 42.7%
  - Rural: 57.3%

Administrative structure
  - Administrative divisions: 1 Settlement okrugs, 11 Rural okrugs
  - Inhabited localities: 1 urban-type settlements, 49 rural localities

Municipal structure
  - Municipally incorporated as: Rovensky Municipal District
  - Municipal divisions: 1 urban settlements, 11 rural settlements
- Time zone: UTC+3 (MSK)
- OKTMO ID: 14650000
- Website: http://www.rovenkiadm.ru/

Rovensky District (Russian: Ро́веньский райо́н) is an administrative district (raion), one of the twenty-one in Belgorod Oblast, Russia. As a municipal division, it is incorporated as Rovensky Municipal District. It is located in the southeast of the oblast. The area of the district is 1,369 square kilometers (529 sq mi).} Its administrative center is the urban locality (a work settlement) of Rovenki. Population: 22,764 (2021 census); 24,060 (2010 census); 25,085 (2002 Census); 24,384 (1989 Soviet census). The population of Rovenki accounts for 48.1% of the district's total population.
