= Rovenki, Russia =

Rovenki Ровеньки
- Urban-type settlement
- Flag Coat of arms
- Interactive map of Rovenki
- Location of Rovenki Rovenki (Belgorod Oblast)
- Coordinates: 49°55′07″N 38°54′13″E
- Country: Russia
- Federal subject: Belgorod Oblast
- Founded: 1650
- Urban-type settlement status since: 1976

Population
  - Estimate (2025): 10,579 )

Municipal status
  - Municipal district: Rovensky Municipal District
  - Urban settlement: Rovensky Urban Settlement
  - Capital of: Rovensky Municipal District, Rovensky Urban Settlement
- Time zone: UTC+3 (MSK)
- Postal code: 309740
- Dialing code: +7 47238
- OKTMO ID: 14650151051

Rovenki (Russian: Ровеньки́) is an urban-type settlement in Belgorod Oblast, Russia. It is the administrative center of Rovensky District. Population: 10,939 (2021 census); 10,264 (2010 census); 9,742 (2002 census); 8,400 (1989 Soviet census).

== History ==
The date of foundation Rovenki village is considered to be 1650, which left a nominal decree of Tsar Alexei Mikhailovich, the strengthening of Russia's southern borders. Initially the settlement was called Aspen Rovenёk. This title is retained until at least 1752. In 1669, St. Nicholas Church was founded in the village.

During the peasant uprising led by K. Bulavin, Rovenki been one of the strong points of his supporters. After the uprising settlement the settlement was destroyed on the orders of Peter I. In 1709 he issued a royal decree on resettlement Cossacks Ostrogozhsk regiment of treeless settlements along the river. Since then, the settlement Rovenki began to grow rapidly.

The status of urban-type settlement was granted in 1976.
