= Chernyanka, Belgorod Oblast =

Urban locality in Belgorod Oblast, Russia

Chernyanka Чернянка
- Urban-type settlement
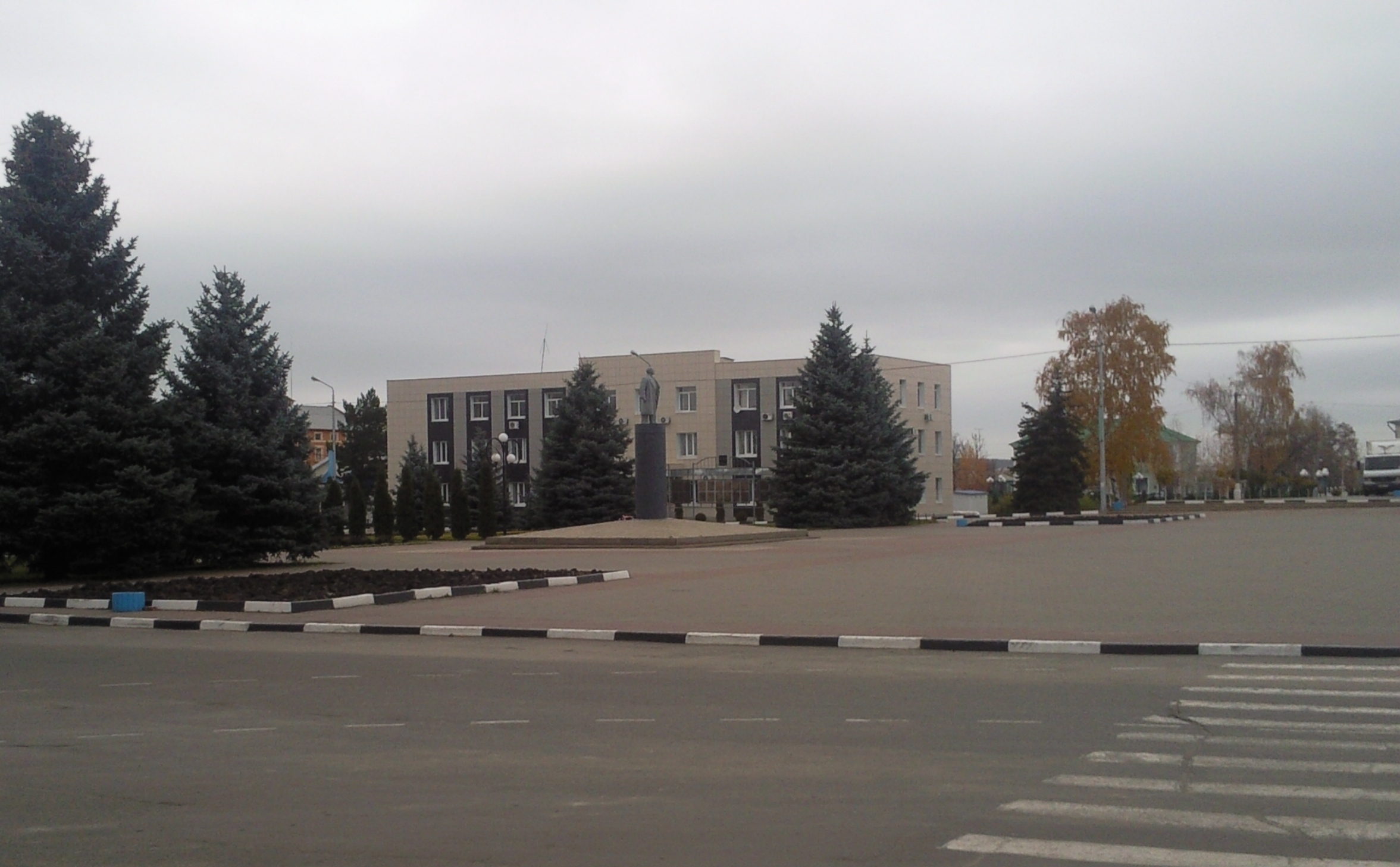
- The main square in Chernyanka

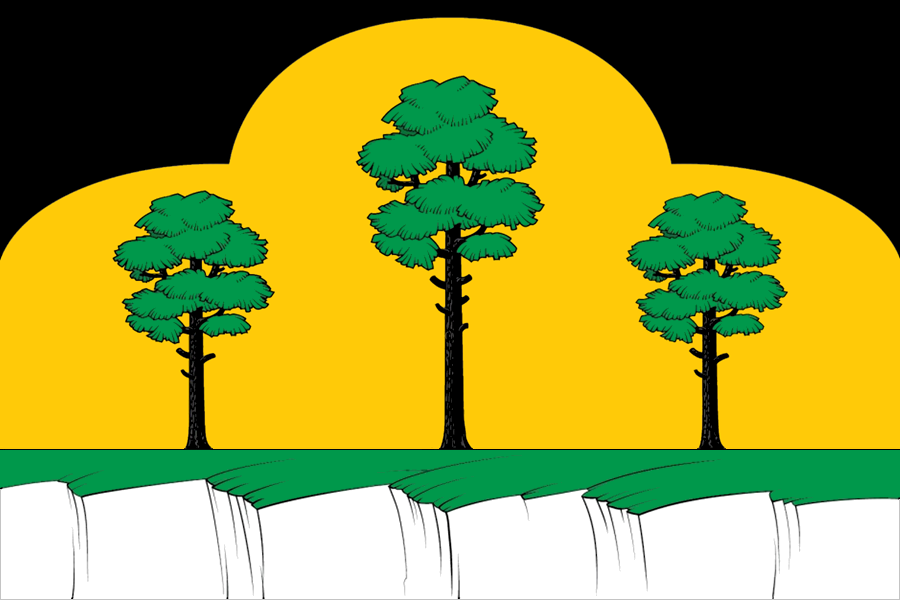
- Flag
- Interactive map of Chernyanka
- Location of Chernyanka Chernyanka (European Russia) Chernyanka (Russia)
- Coordinates: 50°56′N 37°48′E
- Country: Russia
- Federal subject: Belgorod Oblast
- Administrative district: Chernyansky District
- Founded: 1656

Population (2010 Census)
  - Total: 15,217
  - Estimate (1 January 2024): 14,632 (−3.8%)
- Time zone: UTC+3 (MSK)
- Postal code: 309560–309562
- OKTMO ID: 14654151051

Chernyanka (Russian: Черня́нка) is an urban locality (a settlement) and the administrative center of Chernyansky District of Belgorod Oblast, Russia, located along the Oskol River. Population: 14,896 (2021 census); 15,217 (2010 census); 15,067 (2002 census); 13,475 (1989 Soviet census).

It was first mentioned in 1656.

Historical affiliations
- Tsardom of Russia (1656–1721)
- Russian Empire (1721–1917)
- (Russia) Russian Republic (1917)
- Soviet Russia (1917–1922)
- Soviet Union (1922–1991)
- Russian Federation (1991–present)
