= Maysky, Belgorod Oblast =

Maysky Майский
- Selo
- Interactive map of Maysky
- Location of Maysky Maysky (European Russia) Maysky (Russia)
- Coordinates: 50°31′22″N 36°27′22″E
- Country: Russia
- Federal subject: Belgorod Oblast

Population
  - Estimate (2021): 14,143 )
- Time zone: UTC+3 (MSK)
- Postal code: 308503
- OKTMO ID: 14610450101

Maysky (Russian: Майский) is a rural locality (a selo) and the administrative center of Belgorodsky District of Belgorod Oblast, Russia. Population: 14,143 (2021 census); 8,748 (2010 census); 7,441 (2002 census).

It is on the M2 highway, 16 kilometers south-west of central Belgorod. It is the location of the Belgorod State Agricultural University.
