= Veydelevka =

Veydelevka Вейделевка
- Urban-type settlement
- Coat of arms
- Interactive map of Veydelevka
- Location of Veydelevka
- Coordinates: 50°9′13″N 38°27′0″E
- Country: Russia
- Federal subject: Belgorod Oblast
- Founded: 1747
- Elevation: 161 m (528 ft)

Population (2010 Census)
  - Total: 7,008
  - Estimate (2025): 7,092 (+1.2%)
- Time zone: UTC+3 (MSK)
- Postal code: 309720
- OKTMO ID: 14625151051

Veydelevka (Russian: Ве́йделевка) is an urban locality (an urban-type settlement) and the administrative center of Veydelevsky District of Belgorod Oblast, Russia. Population: 7,347 (2021 census); 7,008 (2010 census); 7,188 (2002 census); 7,055 (1989 Soviet census).
