= Chernyansky District =

Chernyansky District Чернянский район (Russian)
- District
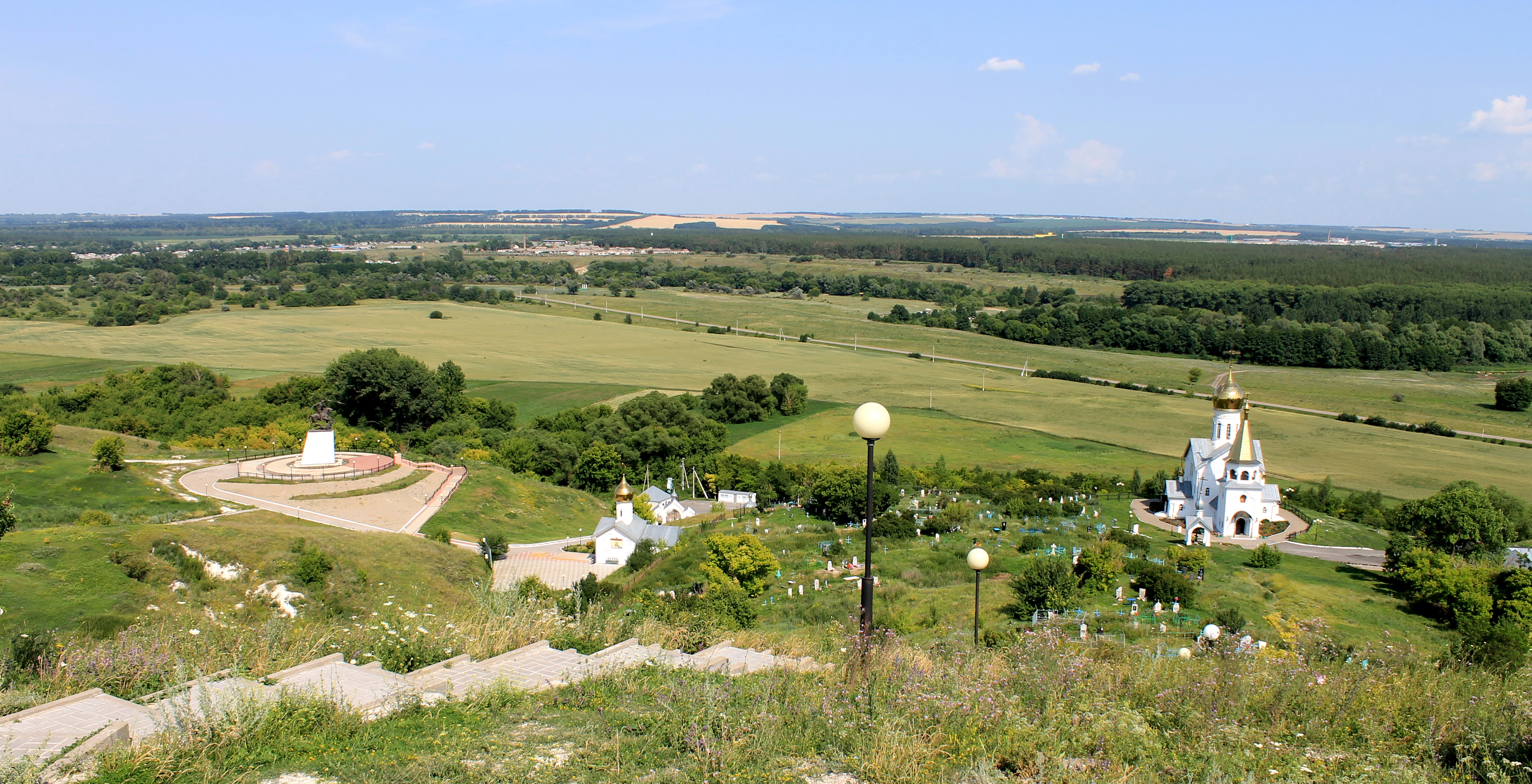
- Kolky Monastery, Chernyansky District

- Flag Coat of arms
- Location of Chernyansky District in Belgorod Oblast
- Coordinates: 50°56′N 37°48′E
- Country: Russia
- Federal subject: Belgorod Oblast
- Established: 12 (Julian)
- Administrative center: Chernyanka

Area
  - Total: 1,192 km^{2} (460 sq mi)

Population (2010 Census)
  - Total: 32,647
  - Density: 27.39/km^{2} (70.94/sq mi)
  - Urban: 46.6%
  - Rural: 53.4%

Administrative structure
  - Inhabited localities: 1 urban-type settlements, 56 rural localities

Municipal structure
  - Municipally incorporated as: Chernyansky Municipal District
  - Municipal divisions: 1 urban settlements, 15 rural settlements
- Time zone: UTC+3 (MSK)
- OKTMO ID: 14654000
- Website: http://admchern.ru/

Chernyansky District (Russian: Черня́нский райо́н) is an administrative district (raion), one of the twenty-one in Belgorod Oblast, Russia. Municipally, it is incorporated as Chernyansky Municipal District. It is located in the northern central part of the oblast. The area of the district is 1,192 square kilometers (460 sq mi). Its administrative center is the urban locality (a settlement) of Chernyanka. Population: 29,726 (2021 census); 32,647 (2010 census); 33,899 (2002 Census); 32,056 (1989 Soviet census). The population of Chernyanka accounts for 50.1% of the district's total population.
