= Veydelevsky District =

Veydelevsky District Вейделевский район (Russian)
- District
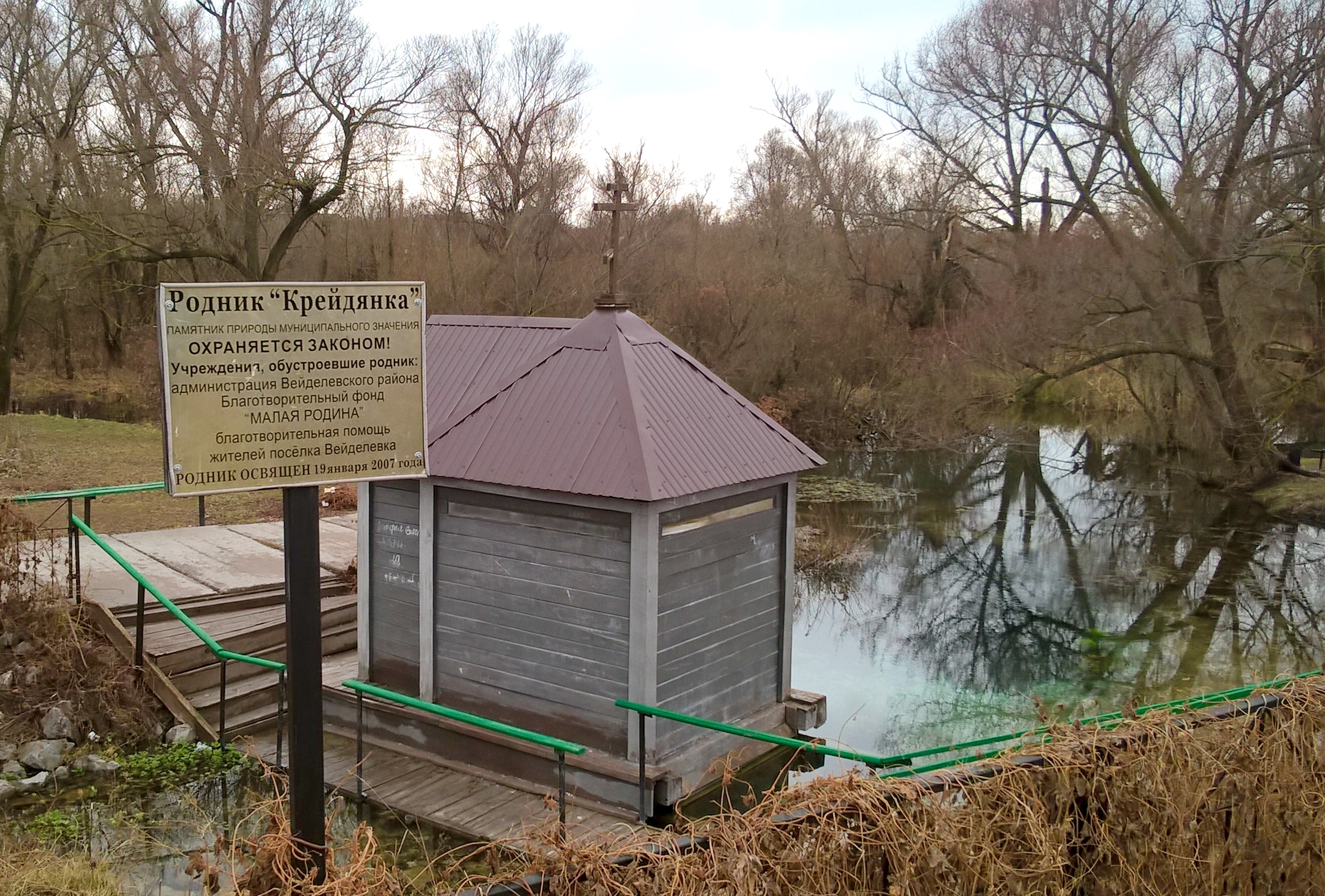
- Protected spring in Veydelevsky District

- Flag Coat of arms
- Location of Veydelevsky District in Belgorod Oblast
- Coordinates: 50°09′13″N 38°27′00″E
- Country: Russia
- Federal subject: Belgorod Oblast
- Established: 30 July 1928
- Administrative center: Veydelevka

Area
  - Total: 1,356.50 km^{2} (523.75 sq mi)

Population (2010 Census)
  - Total: 21,670
  - Estimate (2015): 19,942
  - Density: 15.97/km^{2} (41.37/sq mi)
  - Urban: 32.3%
  - Rural: 67.7%

Administrative structure
  - Inhabited localities: 1 urban-type settlements, 63 rural localities

Municipal structure
  - Municipally incorporated as: Veydelevsky Municipal District
  - Municipal divisions: 1 urban settlements, 11 rural settlements
- Time zone: UTC+3 (MSK)
- OKTMO ID: 14625000
- Website: http://www.veidadm.ru/

Veydelevsky District (Russian: Ве́йделевский райо́н) is an administrative district (raion), one of the twenty-one in Belgorod Oblast, Russia. Municipally, it is incorporated as Veydelevsky Municipal District. It is located in the southeast of the oblast. The area of the district is 1,356 square kilometers (524 sq mi). Its administrative center is the urban locality (a settlement) of Veydelevka. Population: 21,332 (2021 census); 21,670 (2010 census); 24,555 (2002 Census); 24,108 (1989 Soviet census). The population of Veydelevka accounts for 34.4% of the district's total population.
