= Belgorodsky District =

Belgorodsky District Белгородский район (Russian)
- District
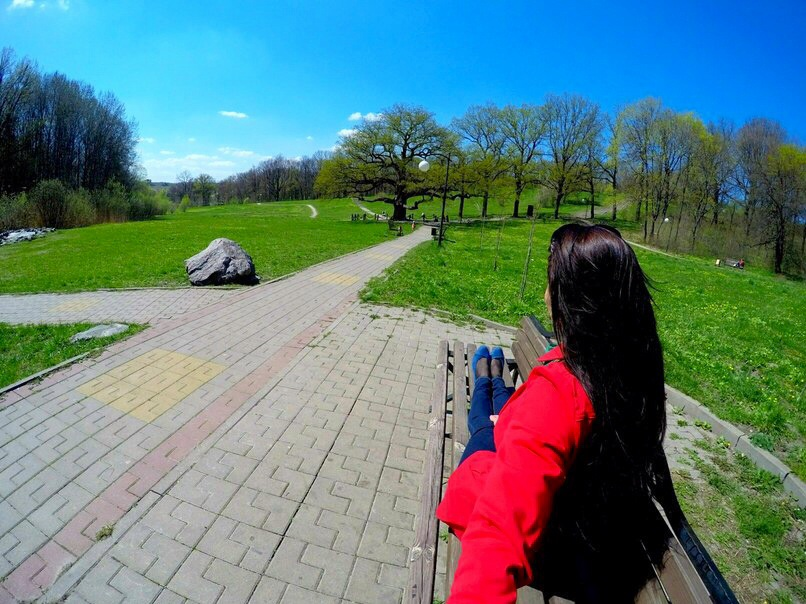
- Oaks in Dubovoe

- Flag Coat of arms
- Location of Belgorodsky District in Belgorod Oblast
- Coordinates: 50°36′N 36°36′E
- Country: Russia
- Federal subject: Belgorod Oblast
- Established: 30 July 1928
- Administrative center: Maysky

Area
  - Total: 1,472 km^{2} (568 sq mi)

Population
  - Estimate (2018): 119,135
  - Urban: 31.2%
  - Rural: 68.8%

Administrative structure
  - Inhabited localities: 3 urban-type settlements, 83 rural localities

Municipal structure
  - Municipally incorporated as: Belgorodsky Municipal District
  - Municipal divisions: 3 urban settlements, 21 rural settlements
- Time zone: UTC+3 (MSK)
- OKTMO ID: 14610000
- Website: http://www.belrn.ru/

Belgorodsky District (Russian: Белгоро́дский райо́н) is an administrative district (raion), one of the twenty-one in Belgorod Oblast, Russia. Municipally, it is incorporated as Belgorodsky Municipal District. It is located in the southwest of the oblast, on the border with Ukraine. The area of the district is 1,472 square kilometers (568 sq mi). Its administrative center is the rural locality (a settlement) of Maysky. Population: 191,744 (2021 census); 108,778 (2010 census); 90,430 (2002 Census); 68,870 (1989 Soviet census). The population of Maysky accounts for 7.4% of the district's total population.

== Geography ==
Belgorodsky District is in the southwestern part of Belgorod Oblast and surrounds the city of Belgorod. The district is bordered on the west by Borisovsky District, on the north by Yakovlevsky District and Korochansky District, on the east by Shebekinsky District, and on the south by Kharkiv Oblast of Ukraine. The Ukrainian city of Kharkiv is 25 kilometres (16 mi) away to the south. The administrative center of the district is the town of Maysky, which is 16 kilometers south-west of central Belgorod.

The terrain is hilly plain averaging 200 metres (660 ft) above sea level; the district lies on the Orel-Kursk plateau of the Central Russian Upland. The major river through the district is the Donets, which flows south to through eastern Ukraine to the Don river. Belogorye Nature Reserve, one of Russia's oldest "zapovedniks" (strict nature reserves), is located in Belgorodsky District.
