= 2023 Belgorod Oblast incursions =

Incident on the Russia-Ukraine border

- Part of the attacks in Russia during the Russian invasion of Ukraine
- Reported extent of territorial control during the raids
Date	First raid: 22–23 May 2023 (1 day); Second raid: 1–15 June 2023 (2 weeks); Sporadic incursions: 17 June – 17 December 2023 (6 months)
Location	Grayvoronsky and Shebekinsky districts, Belgorod Oblast, Russia 50°29′N 35°40′E
Result	First raid: Inconclusive: Pro-Ukrainian forces withdraw from Russian territory; Second raid: Inconclusive: Pro-government sources claim anti-government forces removed from oblast on June 15, anti-government forces continue to shell the oblast

Belligerents
Russian opposition Belarusian militant groups Polish militant groups Chechen militant groups Ukraine (alleged by Russia, denied by Ukraine) (Note: See § Ukrainian involvement for more details.)	Russia

Commanders and leaders
Maximilian Andronnikov; Denis Kapustin; Daniil "Puck" Maznik †	(Russia) Aleksandr Lapin (Russia) Andrey Stesev †

Units involved
Freedom of Russia Legion; Russian Volunteer Corps; Polish Volunteer Corps; After June 2023: Belarusian Volunteer Corps; Terror Battalion; Separate Special Purpose Battalion	Russian Armed Forces; Federal Security Service; Border Service

Strength
~80–500 fighters 1+ tank(s); 3+ armoured vehicles	Multiple helicopters

Casualties and losses
Per Russia: 100+ killed 1 unmanned aerial vehicle shot down 4 armoured fighting vehicles destroyed 5 pickup trucks destroyed Per FRL/RVC: 2 killed, 10 wounded 1 killed, 2 wounded Per OSINT: 8 vehicles	Per Russia: 14+ servicemen killed Per RVC: several personnel captured in May; 1 border guard killed 1 armoured personnel vehicle captured 12+ personnel captured in June; Per OSINT: 1 artillery, 4 vehicles
- Per Russia: 13 civilians killed 50 civilians wounded Thousands of civilians evacuated

On 22 May 2023, armed groups from Ukraine carried out a cross-border raid into Belgorod Oblast, Russia. Two Russian rebel groups allied with and based in Ukraine—the Freedom of Russia Legion (FRL) and the Russian Volunteer Corps (RVC)—claimed to have taken control of several border settlements, and clashed with Russian government forces. The Polish Volunteer Corps participated in the raid. Russian authorities said the attacks were conducted by a Ukrainian "sabotage group", and imposed counter-terrorism measures in the region. It was the largest cross-border attack during the war since the initial beginning of the Russian invasion of Ukraine on 24 February 2022.

On 1 June, another incursion began near the town of Shebekino, with the RVC announcing that the promised "second phase" of the fighting had begun. This time, the Belarusian volunteer Terror Battalion participated in the raid. A spokesman for the Freedom of Russia Legion said their goals were to draw Russian troops away from other parts of the front, and to encourage rebellion against the Russian government. On 12 March 2024, Russian rebels launched another major cross-border operation in Belgorod and Kursk Oblasts.

== Background ==
Several attacks in Western Russia, primarily in Bryansk, Kursk, and Belgorod oblasts, were reported since the start of the Russian invasion of Ukraine, which began on 24 February 2022. Russia accused Ukraine of being responsible for these attacks. According to The Moscow Times, in June 2022, "Ukraine [had] not claimed responsibility for the attacks ... while not formally denying being behind them."

Following an attack against Belgorod in April 2022, Oleksiy Danilov, secretary of the Ukrainian National Security and Defense Council, joked that these events were related to the establishment of a "Belgorod People's Republic". The information warfare spawned satirical calls to "hold independence referendum in Belgorod region". Calls and text messages from unknown numbers and telegram chats were sent to residents of the region: "They call us BNR, that is, the Belgorod People's Republic, in their Ukrainian chats. By analogy with the LNR and DNR", a local resident said in July 2022.

In March 2023, the Russian Volunteer Corps, a Russian nationalist group fighting against the Russian government, claimed responsibility for a brief incursion into neighboring Bryansk Oblast.

Late on 21 May 2023, Belgorod Oblast officials claimed that a quadcopter had dropped explosives on a government building in the village of Golovchino.

== First raid ==
=== 22 May ===
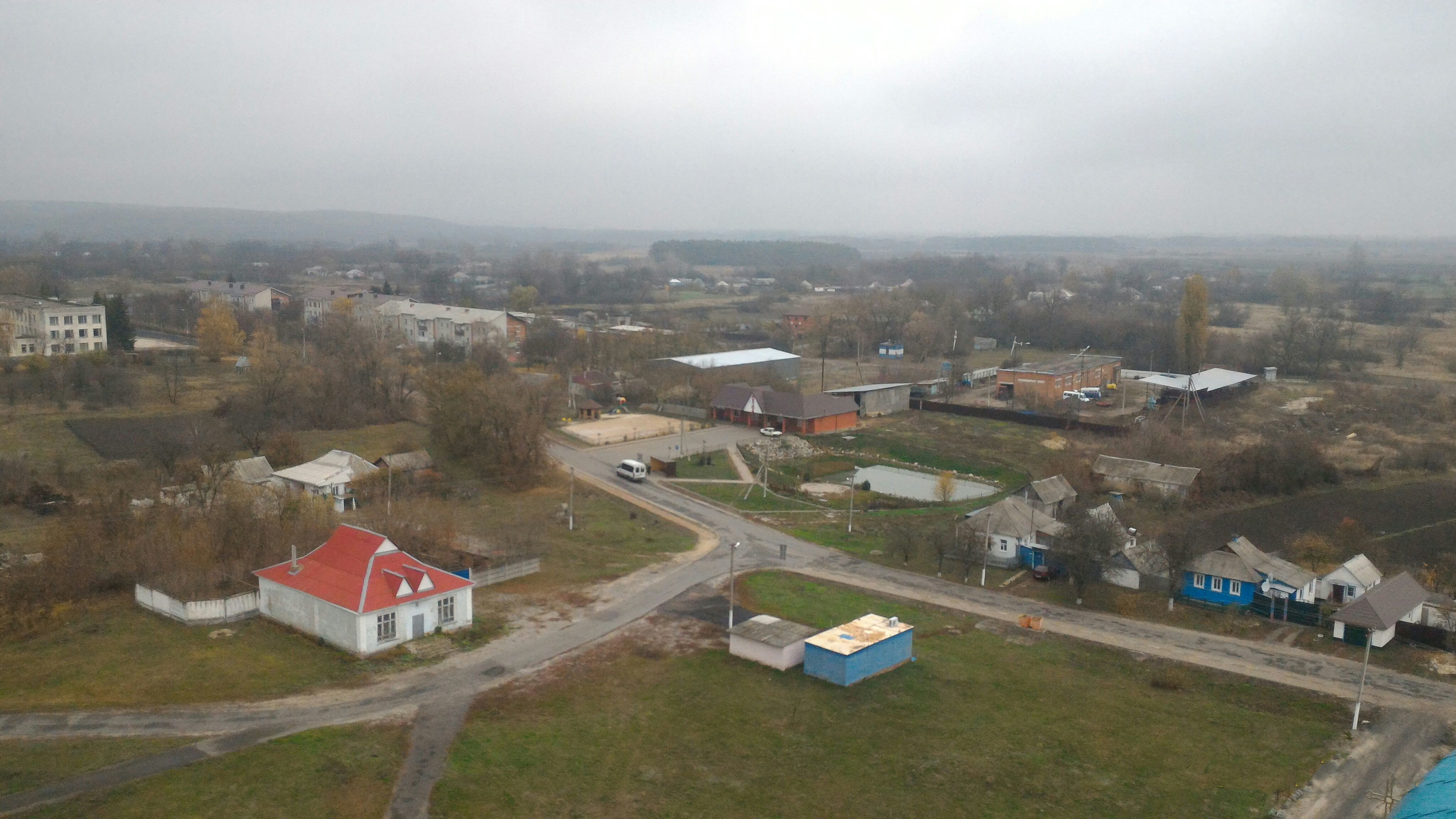
2019 aerial view of the border village of Kozinka

On 22 May 2023, footage emerged on Russian Telegram channels showing an apparent military raid on the Russian border checkpoint in the Grayvoronsky District of Belgorod Oblast. Later that day, Belgorod Oblast governor Vyacheslav Gladkov announced via Telegram that a "Ukrainian military sabotage and reconnaissance group" had entered the district, saying that Russian forces were "taking the necessary steps to eliminate the enemy". He said there were explosions and drone attacks in the district. The deputy head of Grayvoron's municipal administration and two emergency workers were reportedly wounded in an attack that damaged the town hall.

The Freedom of Russia Legion and the Russian Volunteer Corps claimed responsibility for the incursion, announcing that the two groups working together had taken control of the villages of Kozinka, Gora-Podol, and Glotovo and that forward units had reached the district capital of Grayvoron. They claimed to be creating a "demilitarized zone". The Institute for the Study of War (ISW) assessed that Kozinka had indeed been captured by the paramilitaries, but that it was unclear if the other settlements were as well. In this incursion participated the Polish Volunteer Corps, a Polish volunteer military unit created in mid-February of the same year. They would only confirm this on 4 June after posting images on Twitter proving their involvement; up until that point, there had been reports from Russian soldiers that some of the saboteurs spoke Polish.

While the incursion was taking place, the Freedom of Russia Legion posted videos showing the white-blue-white Russian opposition flag being lifted with balloons over the center of Moscow. The Legion uses this flag. The Russian Volunteer Corps posted photos of their fighters in front of road signs for the settlement of Bezlyudovka in Belgorod Oblast, as well as Lyubimovka and Churovichi in neighboring Bryansk Oblast.

On the evening of 22 May, Gladkov announced that counter-terrorism restrictions were being introduced in Belgorod Oblast. This restricts civilian freedom of movement and communications, requires civilians to show proof of identity, and suspends industries that use hazardous materials, among other restrictions. Gladkov also said that the Belgorod regional government officials, together with the Ministry of Emergency Situations, was going from house to house in border villages to evacuate civilians, and that "most of the population" had been evacuated.

According to Ukrainian officials, Russian forces began an emergency evacuation of nuclear ammunition stockpiles from the nearby Belgorod-22 facility. The Belgorod-22 site is Military Unit Number 25624 of the 12th Chief Directorate.

Nuclear security expert at the United Nations Institute for Disarmament Research, Pavel Podvig, was skeptical about the announcement of the movement of nuclear weapons, since such a maneuver could not go unnoticed by Western intelligence agencies. Despite the current status of the military unit to which the repository belongs, it would be impossible to establish the presence of nuclear weapons in it, Podvig said. The Rybar Telegram channel stated that nuclear weapons were not stored at this facility long before the raid.

=== 23 May ===
According to video reports, the Federal Security Service (FSB) office in the city of Belgorod was struck in a drone attack, nearly 80 km (50 mi) away from the "combat zone". The BBC was able to establish that an FSB building was hit, but it was unclear what caused the damage. Gladkov stated that one civilian had been killed in the fighting and that a drone had been shot down.

In a statement, the Russian Ministry of Defense claimed to have defeated the insurgents and pushed them back to the Ukrainian border. The counter-terrorism restrictions in Belgorod Oblast were lifted that afternoon, though Gladkov called on civilians not to return to border villages yet. The ISW assessed that Russian government forces had likely pushed the anti-government forces back to at least Kozinka, if not over the state border. The Freedom of Russia Legion posted footage showing ongoing fighting.

Throughout the day appeared reports of fighting taking place in or near several other localities in Belgorod Oblast, more precisely Bogun-Gorodok, Gorkovsky, the hamlet of Lozovaya Rudka, Shchetinovka and Tsapovka. Later, during the night of the same day, the Ukrainian journalist Andriy Tsaplienko posted a picture on his Telegram channel showing five allegedly Russian opposition soldiers in front of the entrance sign of Gogolevka, a village in Kursk Oblast. It is unknown to which military unit these soldiers belonged and no official information was released about the incident.

=== Aftermath ===
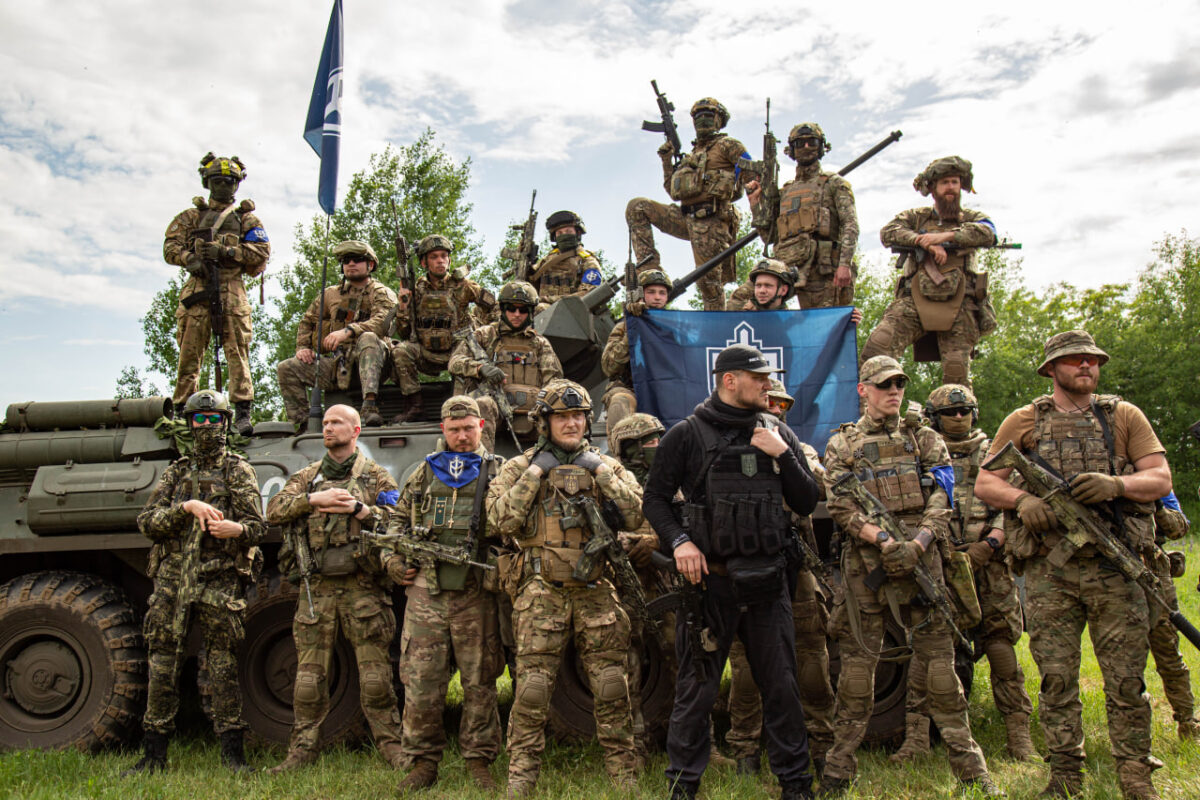
Russian Volunteer Corps members during a press conference on 24 May

On 24 May, governor Gladkov announced that anti-government forces were no longer in the region. He also said that the following districts had been attacked during the incursion: Borisovsky, Volokonovsky, Grayvoronsky, Krasnoyaruzhsky, Shebekinsky, and Yakovlevsky. He later announced that Russian authorities had created seven territorial defense battalions for the defense of the Belgorod region in the future.

The leader of the Russian Volunteer Corps, Denis Kapustin (also Denis Nikitin or "White Rex"), said the group had left Russian territory after 24 hours, and that they were satisfied with the raid at a press conference given on Ukrainian territory.

On 25 May, soldiers of the Russian Volunteer Corps undertook a short raid into Glotovo again.

== Second raid ==
=== 1–3 June ===
On 1 June, the Freedom of Russia Legion and Russian Volunteer Corps said they had begun another raid into Belgorod Oblast. The Russian Defense Ministry said there were three attempted raids along the border in the Shebekinsky District by up to 70 "Ukrainian terrorists" with tanks and armored vehicles. It said that all were repelled and that at least 50 militants were killed, while four of their armored vehicles and a Grad multiple rocket launcher were destroyed. Belgorod governor, Vyacheslav Gladkov, said Ukraine's armed forces had shelled Shebekino with Grad rockets, damaging an administrative building. He said at least nine civilians had been wounded by shelling from Ukraine, and two others by a drone blast in Belgorod city. The RVC claimed that it attacked the Interior Ministry in Shebekino with Grad rockets.

The Belarusian volunteer Terror Battalion participated in this second raid. This is shown by some images of members of the battalion carrying MANPADS published with the comment "Briefly about the emergency landings of military aircraft on the BPR [Belgorod People's Republic]". A video posted on Telegram showed the advance of Belarusian volunteers towards the territory of Belgorod Oblast. Previously, Radyyon Batulin, one of the commanders of the battalion, commented that "nobody canceled visa-free travel for Belarusians to Russia". The Terror Battalion was initially formed as a battalion part of the Kastuś Kalinoŭski Regiment which ended up leaving the regiment and later joined the Belarusian Volunteer Corps.

According to the Institute for the Study of War, the FRL and RVC reached Shebekino and Novaya Tavolzhanka on 1 June. The ISW described the attacks as raids, defining them as "small scale assault operations involving swift entry into hostile territory to secure information, disrupt hostile forces, or destroy installations". Governor Gladkov said residents were being evacuated from the settlements and that all "Ukrainian" forces had withdrawn from Belgorod Oblast by the end of the day.

On 3 June, two civilians driving a car near Maslova Pristan were killed in an artillery strike. Governor Gladkov blamed Ukrainian forces, but the FRL blamed the Russian Army.

=== 4 June – 15 June ===
On 4 June, the FRL posted a video online calling for Governor Vyacheslav Gladkov to meet them "to discuss the current situation in the region and the future of Russia," in exchange for releasing two Russian soldiers they had captured. Gladkov said he would be willing to meet the group in Shebekino. The FRL leadership arrived at the checkpoint outside Shebekino at the agreed time, but Gladkov did not, claiming that the POWs had been executed. In response, the FRL said it would send the POWs to Kyiv.

On 5 June, the pro-Ukrainian forces reported that they killed Russian colonel Andrey Stesev in battle on the territory of Belgorod Oblast. They accused Stesev and his subordinates of killing civilians in the Chechen wars, the Yugoslav Wars, the War in Abkhazia, and in Ukraine, and claimed that he had "systematically terrorized" the population of Belgorod Oblast. Ukrainian military intelligence also announced that Stesev had died in the early hours of 5 June, but according to Meduza, there has not been any independent confirmation of the information.

On 6 June, Gladkov claimed that the anti-government forces were no longer in the region, but the RVC said on 8 June that it was still in control of Novaya Tavolzhanka.

By 15 June, Russian government soldiers claimed to have re-entered Novaya Tavolzhanka.

== Sporadic incursions (June–December 2023) ==
On 17 June, there were still reports of anti-government forces operating in the Belgorod oblast, shelling pro-government positions. The number of evacuations of civilians from border regions was estimated at 6,500, with most of the civilians from Shebekino having left.

On 19 June, Russian sources claimed that 7 civilians where wounded due to anti-government shelling in Belgorod. And on 22 June, the Russian ministry of Defense claimed to have used thermobaric weapons against partisans in the Oblast. During the Wagner Group rebellion on 24 June, it was noted by the Atlantic Council that partisans were still operating in Belgorod.

In mid-July, the Ukrainian Main Directorate of Intelligence published a video showing Chechen volunteers ambushing a Russian military truck at Sereda, Belgorod, killing two Russian soldiers. They were members of the Separate Special Purpose Battalion. In August, the Russian government sanctioned the creation of self-defense militias in Belgorod and Kursk to assist in the border defense.

On 28 September, the Freedom of Russia Legion claimed that it had begun another raid into Belgorod Oblast. The Russian Astra Telegram channel also stated that Russian troops were battling pro-Ukrainian forces at the border.

On 17 December 2023, pro-Ukrainian partisans launched another raid into Belgorod. According to a Russian official and other Russian as well as Ukrainian sources, the insurgents targeted the Morozovsk airbase with "mass drone strikes", while clashing with security forces at the village of Terebreno. The Ukrainian Ministry of Defence subsequently claimed that a Russian "platoon stronghold" at Terebreno had been destroyed by the rebels. The Freedom of Russia Legion claimed responsibility for the raid, and stated that it had withdrawn from Russian territory after mining the eliminated "stronghold" at Terebreno.

== Casualties and losses ==
=== Pro-Ukrainian forces ===
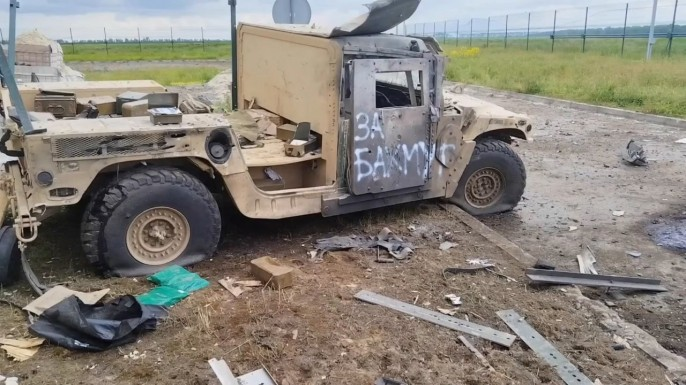
A damaged Humvee, reportedly abandoned by pro-Ukrainian forces

At a 24 May press conference by the RVC, Kapustin said two RVC fighters were wounded in the 23–24 May incursion. Separately, Caesar, the commander and spokesman of the Freedom of Russia Legion, named in reality Maximilian Andronikov, said two of its fighters had been killed and 10 wounded. On 4 June, the Polish Volunteer Corps stated that they suffered no killed or wounded and that the unit successfully completed all its assigned tasks during the first raid.

The Russian Ministry of Defense claimed to have killed more than 70 of the attacking "nationalists" in the 23–24 May incursion. Ministry officials stated that the attackers were Ukrainian. Ministry spokesman Igor Konashenkov said that four armoured vehicles and five pickup trucks belonging to the attackers were destroyed. A Polish AMZ Dzik-2 IMV was also damaged and captured. The Russian Volunteer Corps said none of its fighters had been killed and that it had not lost equipment, and said that the military camouflage on clothing in a photo distributed by Russian officials did not match those of the RVC.

Russian government sources released footage of what it said were several abandoned Western-made military vehicles that had been used by the pro-Ukrainian sources. Experts questioned the authenticity of the claims about the vehicles, and the extent of their truthfulness is uncertain. Three Humvees and two International M1224 MaxxPro MRAPs were claimed as captured, with some noting that markings on some of the vehicles Russia displayed matched those seen in videos released by the Pro-Ukrainian forces. According to Radio Liberty, a participant in the raid revealed in an interview that two Humvees did indeed fall into the trenches near the checkpoint, and were abandoned in the location seen in the video.

=== Russian government forces ===
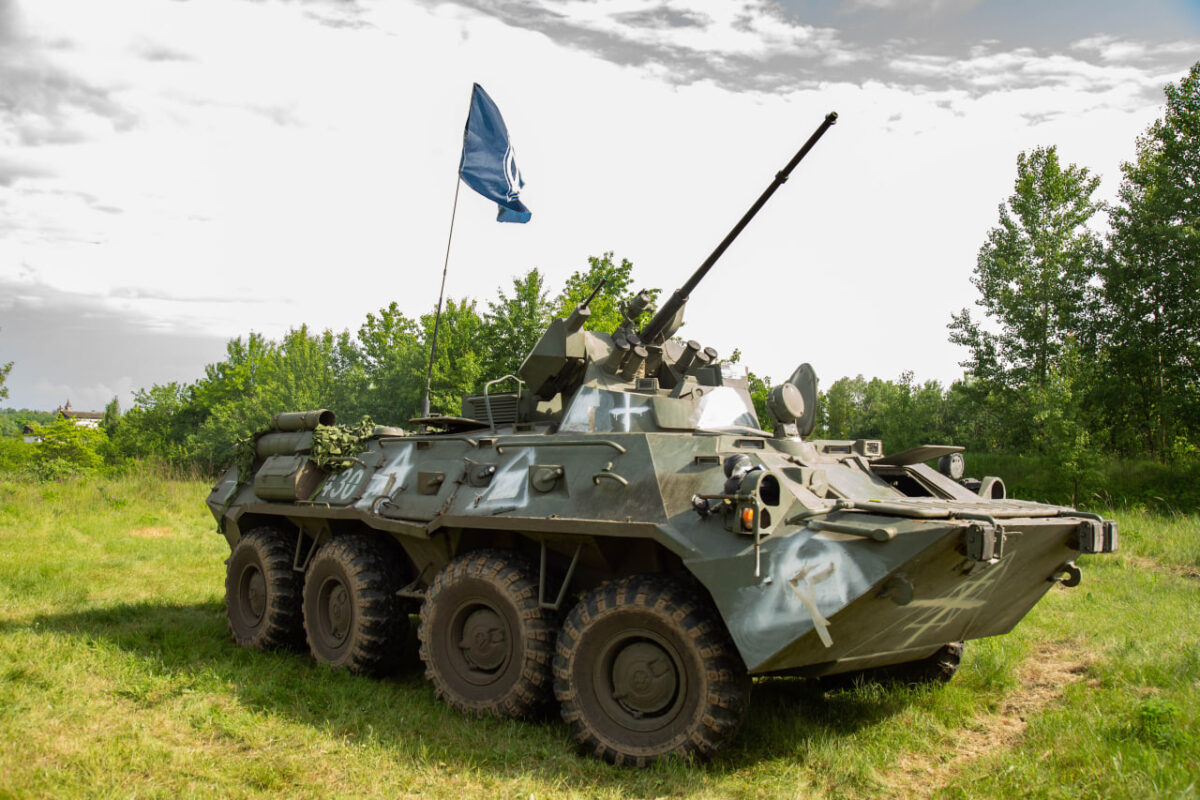
A Russian BTR-82A armoured personnel carrier after being captured by the Russian Volunteer Corps

At the 24 May press conference, Kapustin said his soldiers had seized weapons, an armoured personnel carrier, and taken prisoners before leaving Russian territory. They showed off recently captured equipment, including a Russian BTR-82A armoured personnel carrier. The RVC also posted footage during the raid apparently showing the body of a dead Russian border guard, likely near the Kozinka border checkpoint. Pro-Ukrainian forces also claimed the destruction of two Ural-4320 trucks and a T-12 towed anti-tank gun.

Russian authorities have downplayed the number of casualties they've taken in the incursions, keeping any figures they do have out of public hands. However, Russian soldiers sent to the Oblast report high casualties among the defense forces, mostly due to lack of supplies. The 1009th regiment stated they are struggling and even failing to achieve their goals due to lack of supplies an unverified video of a soldier claiming to be from the 138th Brigade stated that his unit suffered 80% losses (~1600 soldiers) during the fighting.

== Humanitarian impact and evacuations ==
Russian officials have said at least 13 civilians have died since the beginning of the raids, and that over 50 have been injured. Thousands of residents of border towns have been evacuated.

Shebekino, formerly a town of 40,000 inhabitants, was devastated during the second raid, with almost all the inhabitants fleeing.

== Analysis ==
=== Motivation ===
During the first raid, the Freedom of Russia Legion said their main goal was to "liberate" the region and create a "demilitarized zone" in Belgorod Oblast so that Russia could not attack Ukraine from that territory. Andriy Yusov, the spokesman of Ukraine's Military Intelligency Agency (HUR), speaking on 22 May, agreed that the goal of the militants was to "liberate territories" and create a security corridor to protect Ukrainian civilians. Kremlin spokesman Dmitry Peskov called the raid an attempt by Ukraine "to divert attention" away from the Russian capture of Bakhmut. Retired United States Army official Mark Hertling said that the raid was part of Ukrainian shaping operations to "keep the Russian military on the back foot" as Ukraine prepared for its highly anticipated counteroffensive.

At the beginning of the second raid, a spokesman for the Freedom of Russia Legion said their goals were to draw Russian troops away from other parts of the front, and to encourage rebellion against the Russian government.

=== Ukrainian involvement ===
Ukrainian officials denied involvement in the incursion. Ukrainian president Volodymyr Zelenskyy said that the Ukrainian government had "nothing to do with" the incursion, calling it a homegrown Russian "resistance movement". Zelenskyy's senior aide, Mykhailo Podolyak, said that Ukraine was monitoring the situation with interest, but was not involved in the conflict. Andriy Yusov and other Ukrainian officials have denied any direct involvement by the Armed Forces of Ukraine and have said that the striking force was made up only of Russian citizens.

Russian officials claim that the paramilitaries were from "Ukrainian nationalist formations". The Freedom of Russia Legion has been described by the New York Times as "operating under the umbrella" of Ukraine's International Legion. Russian opposition politician Ilya Ponomarev also claimed the unit to be acting as part of the Ukrainian armed forces. Ukrainian officials said the Freedom of Russia Legion operates as part of Ukraine's "defense and security forces" while it is inside Ukraine, but acts independently if it is outside the country.

Speaking to media, Kapustin said that Ukrainian authorities "did encourage" his group, but denied that they provided weapons, equipment, or instructions. He did say that Ukrainian military took in wounded RVC members, but that was the extent of support, saying that "Every decision we make ... beyond the state border is our own decision. Obviously, we can ask our [Ukrainian] comrades, friends for their assistance in planning." He denied reports that his fighters were using weapons provided by Ukraine's Western allies and said Ukraine only provided support with medical supplies, fuel and food.

According to BBC News, it is unlikely that the incursion was made without the help of Ukrainian military intelligence, and may play into Russian narratives that Russia is under attack by Western-backed forces.

== Reactions ==
=== Ukraine ===
The "Belgorod People's Republic" flag

Some Ukrainian officials compared the attack to Russia's use of "little green men" during the early stages of the Russo-Ukrainian War. Mykhailo Podolyak ironically said that "tanks are sold at any Russian military store", referencing Putin's claim that the little green men weren't Russian troops, but local pro-Russian militias who had purchased their uniforms, firearms, and even armored vehicles from military stores.

Ukrainian social media accounts humorously compared the attackers to the pro-Russian separatists in Donbas. Most notably, Ukrainian sources began circulating a photo showing three soldiers who took part in the raid proclaiming a "Belgorod People's Republic" and holding a flag of the supposed republic. Internet memes about creating such an entity, a satire of the pro-Russian Donetsk and Luhansk people's republics, spread on Ukrainian social media following the raid. These included jokes by the Russian insurgents in Russia themselves about holding a referendum in Belgorod Oblast for the formal establishment of the Belgorod People's Republic.

=== Russia ===
Kremlin spokesman Dmitry Peskov said that Russian president Vladimir Putin was informed about the raid. Dmitry Medvedev, deputy chairman of Security Council of Russia, blamed the Ukrainian government for the attack and called for the "extermination" of the perpetrators. Russian Minister of Defense Sergei Shoigu said that the Russian military would respond more harshly to any further incursions.

According to the Institute for the Study of War, the Russian milblogger community reacted to the May raid "with [...] panic, factionalism, and incoherency", consistent with its previous responses to "significant informational shocks". Wagner Group head Yevgeny Prigozhin accused the Russian Defense Ministry of incompetence in defending Russia and its borders.

Following the second incursion on 1 June, Igor Girkin and other Russian ultra-nationalists heavily criticized the Russian government and its response to the attacks. Girkin called Vladimir Putin "out of touch" and complaining about a "lack of Russian military escalation to secure borders".

On 3 June, Yevgeny Prigozhin stated that after his Wagner units withdrew completely from Bakhmut, he would send the units to guard the border of Belgorod Oblast, regardless of orders from the Russian Ministry of Defense. He called Belgorod governor Gladkov "an uneducated, ill-prepared coward", and said Defense Minister Shoigu's lack of resolve had enabled "genocide" against the Russian people.

On 5 June, Ramzan Kadyrov, head of the Chechen Republic stated he would be willing to send 70,000 Chechen fighters to Belgorod to help protect the border, but had his offer declined by the "Russian commander-in-chief".

Residents of Shebekino, when interviewed by Radio Free Europe/Radio Liberty, "still [appeared] to be firmly in support of the campaign under way in Ukraine", but expressed "dismay and confusion" at the lack of helpful response or sympathy from the Russian government.

=== United States ===
United States Department of State spokesperson Matthew Miller said that while the United States "doesn't enable or encourage attacks outside Ukraine's borders", "it is Russia that launched this war" and thus "it is up to Ukraine to decide how they want to conduct their military operations". He also acknowledged reports "circulating on social media and elsewhere" that U.S.-supplied weapons were used in the attack, but said the U.S. was skeptical of such reports.

== See also ==
- 2023 Bryansk Oblast raid
- March 2024 western Russia incursion
- March 2025 Kursk incursion
