= March 2024 western Russia incursion =

- Part of attacks in Russia during the Russian invasion of Ukraine
Date	12 March – 7 April 2024 (3 weeks and 5 days)
Location	Belgorod and Kursk Oblasts, Russia
Result	Inconclusive: RVC claims incursion until 7 April 2024

Belligerents
Ukraine	Russia

Commanders and leaders
Maximilian Andronnikov; Denis Kapustin; Vladislav Ammosov; Rustam Azhiev "Getotac"	Konstantin Bushuev; Ismail Aguyev

Units involved
Freedom of Russia Legion: Sibir Battalion; Russian Volunteer Corps Separate Special Purpose Battalion; Romanian Battlegroup Getica; Supported by: Main Directorate of Intelligence	Russian Armed Forces: Main Intelligence Directorate; 2nd Spetsnaz Brigade; Russian Airborne Forces; National Guard: Zapad-Akhmat; Federal Security Service

Strength
Per Russia: 2,500 fighters	Unknown

Casualties and losses
1 confirmed killed 1 T-64 tank destroyed 1 HUR Mi-24 helicopter shot down Russian claim: (Note: as of March 20); 650+ killed 5 tanks destroyed 4 armored vehicles destroyed	FRL & RVC claim: (Note: As of March 21): 651 killed; 980 wounded; 37 captured; 121 pieces of equipment destroyed, 50 pieces disabled
- 1 civilian wounded

On 12 March 2024, during the Russo-Ukrainian War, Ukrainian-backed armed groups launched a cross-border incursion from Ukraine into Russia. They entered Belgorod and Kursk Oblasts and clashed with the Russian military. At least three groups took part: the Freedom of Russia Legion, Russian Volunteer Corps and Sibir Battalion. They claimed control of at least four settlements in Russia, and many other border settlements remained under contested control. The Russian defense ministry denied this, repeatedly claiming it had beaten back the attackers and forced them to retreat, despite continued fighting. The incursion took place during the 2024 Russian presidential election and was one of several cross-border incursions into Russia following its invasion of Ukraine.

== Timeline ==
=== 12 March ===
At 08:00 local time, the "WarGonzo" telegram channel of Russian milblogger Semyon Pegov reported that "armed groups in pickup trucks", supported by mortar and artillery fire, tried to break through the border in Belgorod Oblast. According to the channel, a breakthrough attempt was made from the village of Odnorobivka, Kharkiv Oblast; about 50 people were moving towards Belgorod Oblast. WarGonzo wrote that as a result of the battle, the armed groups retreated to their original positions, where they were "covered with long-range weapons." Pegov suggested that "most likely the terrorist units of the RDK and the Sibir Battalion acted".

Soon, the Freedom of Russia Legion published a video that allegedly showed tanks crossing the border. A video of the battle was also published by the Sibir Battalion, which claims that "fierce fighting is taking place on the territory of the Russian Federation". The channel also posted a video calling for people not to participate in the 2024 Russian presidential election. Former State Duma deputy Ilya Ponomarev, who lives in Ukraine, claimed that the Freedom of Russia Legion, the Russian Volunteer Corps and the Sibir Battalion entered Kursk and Belgorod Oblasts "as part of a joint operation."

The attackers claimed that they had taken over the villages of Tyotkino in Kursk Oblast and Lozovaya Rudka in Belgorod Oblast. In the evening Russian authorities claimed that the attempts of sabotage groups to infiltrate Russian territory had been prevented. The Russian defence ministry published videos from Tyotkino and Nekhoteyevka, Belgorod Oblast. It also showed a destroyed Ukrainian tank at the border crossing near Nekhoteyevka. The video published by the attackers was later geolocated to the Ukrainian village on the other side of the border.

=== 13 March ===
The Freedom of Russia Legion urged civilians in Belgorod and Kursk to evacuate amid them being "forced to inflict fire damage on military positions in Belgorod and Kursk." They also reported to have destroyed a Russian control centre.

In the morning the Legion published a video with "greetings from the liberated part of Tyotkino", announcing a raid into the village. However, analysis by Agentstvo showed that the footage was filmed in the Ukrainian border village of Ryzhivka, 300 meters from Tyotkino. A representative of the Freedom of Russia Legion told Agentstvo that the video with the fighters was indeed recorded on the edge of Ryzhivka, even "before the storming of Tyotkino". According to his data, at the time the video was published, the insurgents were already in Tyotkino, but he could not provide the video from there, explaining that he risked calling fire on the fighters. There was no independent confirmation that the Freedom of Russia Legion entered Tyotkino.

=== 14 March ===
In Belgorod Oblast, Russian authorities alleged on Telegram that another attack was directed at Grayvoron, near the border with Ukraine, with an air raid warning being initiated, and civilians in the district apparently being evacuated. Anti-Putin armed groups also staged another incursion into Kursk Oblast. Shopping centres in Belgorod were closed due to shelling. The ISW reported that several Russian milbloggers reported continued clashes in Tyotkino as well as in Kozinka and Spodaryushino in Belgorod Oblast. Additionally, the Ukrainian Defence Intelligence (DIU) intercepted orders from Vyacheslav Gladkov to evacuate all civilians out of Grayvoron. Shortly after, RBK circulated videos of Grayvoron's residents evacuating, carrying all of their belongs, on foot, as local officials did not provide any transportation.

=== 15 March ===
Russia's defense ministry claimed that the incursions into Belgorod Oblast from the previous day had been repelled. Andriy Yusov, the press representative for the Main Directorate of Intelligence (HUR) of the Ukrainian Ministry of Defense, claimed that Kursk and Belgorod oblasts were now "active combat zones", stressing that the anti-Putin groups were acting independently and not directed by the Ukrainian government. Firefights continued to be reported in and around Spodaryushino and Popovo-Lezhachi. Shortly after noon a rocket salvo hit Belgorod, striking civilian buildings and streets. The Russian defense ministry also reported continued clashes near Kozinka and Tyotkino. Additionally, Russian milbloggers reported that the 2nd Guards Spetsnaz Brigade was deployed to the region to bolster defenses.

=== 16 March ===
The Russian Volunteer Corps claimed to have captured 25 Russian soldiers. As with the 2023 incursions, where the RVC captured a number of Russian soldiers, the RVC commander, Denis Kapustin, requested an audience with Belgorod's governor, Vyacheslav Gladkov, for a prisoner exchange. The HUR released more intercepted Russian communications, which reported that Russian forces had lost Kozinka and Glotovo, and that the pro-Ukrainian forces were "driving around" Grayvoron with at least one attempted assault on the city along Mira Street. This was further reinforced by a picture posted by the RVC of its fighters supposedly in the forests to the northwest of Grayvoron. The Russian defense ministry also reported clashes near Popivka in Sumy Oblast, and near Spodaryushino and Kozinka.

Early in the morning the FRL warned residents of Belgorod that a series of missile strikes would be conducted against Russian military installations in the city. At 17:00 local time the salvo took place, with Belgorod's governor, Gladkov, reporting that 15 RM-70 Vampire rockets targeted the city, of which eight were shot down, however, the missiles and their debris struck civilian targets, killing two people and injuring three others. A few hours later a second salvo was fired with Gladkov reporting that several of the missiles were shot down and their debris landed on several homes and businesses, starting a fire in an industrial park which injured one civilian.

=== 17 March ===
The Sibir Battalion reported to have captured the village of Gorkovsky in Belgorod Oblast, posting photos of members of the Battalion, alongside Chechen volunteers, in front of the village's administration building. Two days earlier, commander Rustam Azhiev of the Chechen Separate Special Purpose Battalion had announced the beginning of sabotage activities in Russia. Later in the day, the RFL, RVC, and Sibir Battalion posed for pictures raising their respective flags on the administrative building of Kozinka.

The Russian defence ministry said it shot down a Ukrainian Mil Mi-8 transport helicopter that was heading towards the direction of Kozinka. It claimed to have shot down the helicopter over Lukashivka in Sumy Oblast and released footage of its debris. After speculation by Russian milbloggers that the helicopter was a more advanced western attack aircraft, the HUR denied that any of its UH-60 BlackHawk helicopters were lost on that day.

=== 18 March ===
The HUR released more intercepted Russian calls which reported that the population of Grayvoron was completely evacuated to Rakitnoye. Other calls reported pro-Kremlin forces positioning BM-21 Grads in residential intersections, namely in Kirpichny, as well as reports that over half of Gorkovsky was destroyed by pro-Kremlin shelling. Additionally, an FRL spokesmen, Alexei Baranovsky, spoke to the Kyiv Post stating that pro-Kremlin forces were shelling civilian targets. The Russian military retorted that anti-Kremlin forces were firing mortars indiscriminately into civilian areas.

=== 19 March ===
The FRL claimed to have destroyed an ammunition depot in Tyotkino. Meanwhile, the Romanian Battlegroup Getica, a unit of Romanians and Moldovans in the International Legion, announced that they had been participating in the incursions for the past "few days", namely in the woods to the northwest of Grayvoron.

Authorities in Belgorod Oblast announced plans to evacuate 9,000 children from Belgorod city, as well as from Belgorod, Shebekino and Grayvoron districts due to the attacks. Russian President Vladimir Putin again announced that the "terrorist" attacks in Kursk and Belgorod Oblasts were "repelled" and "suppressed" by the Federal Security Service (FSB), despite continued raids persisting, and pro-Ukrainian forces still occupying at least four villages along the border.

=== 20 March ===
Governor Gladkov announced the creation of checkpoints and roadblocks to the evacuated settlements of Kozinka, Glotovo, Gora-Podol, Novostroyevka-Pervaya, Novostroyevka-Vtoraya, Bezymeno, and Grayvoron, banning entry to outsiders.

Fighting was reported to be ongoing in Krasnaya Yaruga, Kozinka, Grayvoron, Gorkovsky, Zhuravlyovka, and Oktyabrsky, as well as other incursions in Kursk. The FRL also released more intercepted calls which reported that Belgorod's population was being evacuated to Stary Oskol. The Russian defence ministry said that its forces had "fully cleared" Kozinka from the militants, killing 650 of them with "air strikes and artillery fire." German milblogger Julian Röpcke assessed that the military had air-dropped high-explosive FAB-500 bombs in its efforts. Some Russian milbloggers dissented with the official defence ministry report, claiming that there was still fighting in Kozinka.

=== 21 March ===
The FSB announced the arrest of four individuals for "justifying terrorism". One of them, a resident of Belgorod, was accused of working with the RVC to plot an attack against a Russian military site. Meanwhile, Russian milbloggers claimed that VDV conscripts repelled an incursion near Tyotkino, while Chechen leader Ramzan Kadyrov claimed his Zapad-Akhmat militia were deployed to Belgorod and took part in the fighting near the Kharkiv section of the border.

In Kyiv, Alexei Baranovsky of the RFL, Denis Kapustin of the RVC and "Kholod" of the Sibir battalion met for a press conference held by Ukrinform stating that they are still operating in the region, and that they will only release their casualty figures once the operation is completed.

=== 22 March ===
Dmitry Peskov, the press secretary for Putin, repeated the Russian government's continued claim that all anti-Kremlin forces had been repelled from Belgorod and Kursk oblasts. The FSB also announced that its officers detained seven men in Moscow on suspicion of collaborating with the RVC.

=== 26 March ===
The FSB said that an "accomplice" of the RVC died after an improvised explosive device he was carrying went off while he was being arrested on charges of plotting to attack a humanitarian aid collection point in Samara Oblast.

=== 27 March ===
The first reported casualty among pro-Ukrainian forces was confirmed, Dani Tammam Akel, a 25-year old volunteer who went by the call sign Apostol. A supporter of Alexei Navalny, Akel had fled Russia for Estonia at the outbreak of war in 2022.

=== 7 April ===
The Russian Volunteer Corps announced the conclusion of the "hot phase" of its raids into Russia, claiming that while they were no longer participating in intense fighting against government forces, sabotage and reconnaissance groups have remained in Belgorod and Kursk oblasts.

== Casualties ==
The Russian Telegram channel Baza reported that two people were wounded during the fighting, one of whom was a local resident. On 12 March, the Russian Defense Ministry claimed that it had killed 234 attackers during the incursion. On 21 March, the FRL and RVC claimed that they had killed 651, injured 980, and captured 37 pro-Kremlin personnel.

On 18 March, the FLR released a list of equipment that they claimed to have destroyed or damaged during the raid, including seven tanks destroyed (including three T-72s) and a T-72 and T-80PVM tank each damaged. (Note: Also included were 20 infantry fighting vehicles (including BMP-2, BMP-3), 6 D-30 howitzers, 4 armored personnel carriers, 4 mortars, 2 MT, 12 Rapira, 2 2S19 Msta-S, 2 ZALA UAVs, 1 BM 21 Grad, 1 easel-mounted anti-tank grenade launcher, 1 Murom complex, 1 electronic warfare station, 1 repeater, 2 units of armored vehicles, 2 units of engineering equipment (excavators) and 57 units of various automotive equipment (heavy and light) destroyed, as well as 1 armored personnel carrier, 1 BM 21 Grad, 2 MT-LBS, 1 Msta-B, 1 TOS-2, 1 BM 21 Grad, 1 2C1 Gvozdika, 1 electronic warfare station, 1 armored vehicle and 20 units of various automotive equipment (heavy and light) damaged)

Most Western analysts agree that the casualty figures presented by either side are highly inflated.

== Reactions ==
=== Ukraine ===
Ukrainian officials denied involvement in the attack. According to Andriy Yusov, these formations "act absolutely autonomously, independently, and carry out their socio-political program tasks." However, the Freedom of Russia Legion is reportedly part of the International Legion, (Note: the RFL and RVC's direct affiliation to the legion is unknown, as they are listed under the command of Military Unit A3449, a secretive HUR detachment, however, they were, at one point, both in the legion) a unit in the Territorial Defense Forces, the Ukrainian military reserve.

Kyrylo Budanov, head of the HUR, stated on 16 March that there is "no doubt the subjectivity (of anti-Kremlin militias) has been shaping up, they cannot be called a 'grouping' anymore, now they are becoming a force," commenting on the organization of the insurgent groups and that the HUR would support them "to the extent possible." On 22 March, HUR spokesperson Andrii Yusov said that the incursion had forced Russia to "change plans" regarding a possible attack on the northern Ukraine sector by diverting its forces to Belgorod Oblast.

The Kyiv Independent stated that the incursion has "no clear plan" and that while the FRL and RVC stated their overall goal is marching on Moscow and toppling the Russian government, an FRL spokesmen stated "this is not a realistic scenario in the foreseeable timeline." Alexei Baranovsky, another spokesman for the FRL, stated that the immediate goal of the incursion was to "disrupt the regional votes" and to "galvanize domestic Russian opposition." Meanwhile, the FRL's Telegram account stated that its goal was to end the shelling of Kharkiv by Russian artillery from positions in Belgorod Oblast.

In their 21 March press conference in Kyiv, the leaders of the incursion stated they received intelligence and logistics support from Ukraine, but repeated their assertion that they were acting independently of Kyiv when fighting on Russian territory. Kapustin went on to say that Ukraine provided small arms ammunition and medical evacuations. However, when asked where they acquired their heavy weapons, armored vehicles, and tanks, Kapustin stated that "one could buy tanks and rocket launcher systems in a military surplus shop", apparently referring to a claim made by Vladimir Putin that the Little Green Men during the invasion of Crimea where simply civilians outfitted with commercially available surplus. Meanwhile, Baranovsky, the spokesman for the RFL, stated portions of the heavy equipment where "trophies" from earlier engagements with Russian forces.

=== Russia ===
The incursions took place during the 2024 Russian presidential election with Russian President Vladimir Putin describing them as an attempt to "disrupt" the election and "interfere with the normal process of expressing the will of citizens." On 19 March, Putin ordered the FSB to hunt down and "punish" Russians serving in the Ukrainian military and compared them to the Russian Liberation Army, a World War II-era Nazi collaborationist unit. Schools in Kursk were ordered to shift to remote learning for the rest of the week, while a missile alert was declared in the city. On 12 March, the Russian military operational headquarters of Kursk Oblast banned the publication and distribution of content showing Russian military personnel, artillery strikes, air defenses, and drone strikes in an effort to preserve operations security in the region.

On 14 March, the ISW noted an increase in anti-government discontent in the military's handling of the incursions, similar to the discontent expressed by the ultra-nationalist opposition, such as Igor Girkin and Yevgeny Prigozhin, during the 2023 Belgorod Oblast raids. However, these critiques are far less likely to proliferate through the general Russian public, as the Russian government has taken a concerted effort to take control of the Telegram info-space to censor anti-government opinions following the Wagner Group rebellion. However, the ISW concluded that the Russian government must soon make a decision to either reallocate military resources to Kursk and Belgorod, or pay a "reputation cost" among the ultra-nationalists.

In a speech to the Security Council of Russia, Putin stated that the total number of pro-Ukrainian "mercenaries" was at approximately 2,500 fighters, making this the largest armed incursion into Russia proper since World War II.

A Gallup poll on 13 March found that only 32 percent of Russians say they are prepared to go to war for their country if needed. The New York Sun concluded that the incursions had resulted in a noted decrease in popular support for the war in Russia.

== See also ==
- 2023 Belgorod Oblast incursions
- 2023 Bryansk Oblast raid
- Kursk offensive
- March 2025 Belgorod incursion
- Timeline of the Russian invasion of Ukraine (1 December 2023 – 31 March 2024)
