= Tymur Special Unit =

- Спецпідрозділ Тимура
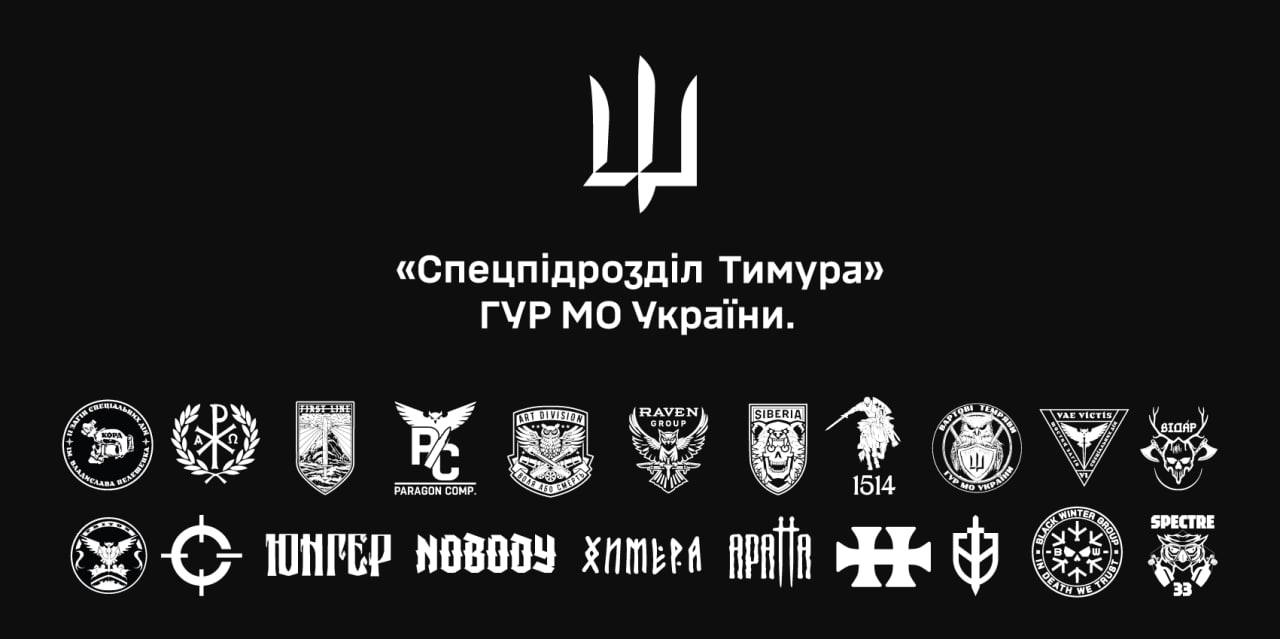
- Insignia
- Founded: 2022
- Country: Ukraine
- Branch: Main Directorate of Intelligence
- Type: Spetsnaz
- Role: Reconnaissance, counteroffensive and sabotage
- Size: Detachment
- Engagements: Russo-Ukrainian War; Russian invasion of Ukraine

Commanders
- Current commander: "Tymur"

The Tymur Special Unit is a special-purpose unit within the Main Directorate of Intelligence of the Ministry of Defence of Ukraine (HUR of the MoD of Ukraine), which takes part in combat and special operations during the Russo-Ukrainian war. The unit’s activities are covered in official statements of the HUR of the MoD of Ukraine and in materials of Ukrainian mass media.

== History ==
The unit was formed after the start of the full-scale invasion of Ukraine by the Russian Federation in 2022 as one of the special-purpose units of the Main Directorate of Intelligence of the Ministry of Defense of Ukraine. Its creation was based on the need to carry out complex combat tasks in areas of active hostilities and in temporarily occupied territories.

The unit’s name comes from the call sign of its commander — "Tymur". Information about the unit’s personnel strength, internal structure, and exact dates of formation is not disclosed in open sources for security reasons.

== Structure ==
- Unit “Raven Group”
- Bratstvo Battalion
- Stuhna Battalion
- Chimera Unit
- Unit “Art Division”
- Aratta Battalion
- Unit “Junger”
- NOBODY Battalion
- Special Unit “1514”
- Unit “Guardians of the Darkness”
- 2nd Special Operations Detachment
- Active Operations Unit “Kord”
- 6th Special Operations Detachment
- Reconnaissance-strike unmanned systems company “First Line”
- "Paragon Company" Detachment
- Black Winter Group
- Russian Volunteer Corps
- Sibir Battalion
- Belarusian Volunteer Corps
- “Cyber, Death + Robots”

== Activities ==
According to reports by the Main Directorate of Intelligence of the Ministry of Defense of Ukraine and Ukrainian media, the Tymur Special Unit has taken part in combat and special operations in various sectors of the front, particularly in areas of active fighting in eastern Ukraine.

Certain aspects of the unit’s activities were covered in publicly released photo and video materials published by the HUR of the Ministry of Defense of Ukraine, taking into account information security requirements.

== Command ==
The unit is commanded by an officer of the HUR of the Ministry of Defense of Ukraine with the call sign “Tymur.” Detailed information about the command staff and tactical subunits is not available in open sources.

== Operations during the Russo-Ukrainian War ==
=== Svyatosha Group ===
On 25 December 2022, a sabotage group of fighters from “Bratstvo,” which is part of the “Timur Special Unit,” with the call signs Nepyypivo, Tarasii, Svyatosha, and Apollon, conducted a deep raid with a covert mission in enemy-controlled territory. After encountering Russian troops, the four reconnaissance fighters refused to surrender and were killed in combat.

=== Liberation of Snake Island ===
Fighters of the “Tymur Special Unit” took part in the liberation of Snake Island. Preparation for the operation lasted five days. According to Timur, the day of the decisive operation on Snake Island was divided into several stages: the first stage involved artillery preparation, the second involved aviation. The task was to raise the Ukrainian state flag on the helicopter landing pad. After that, the third stage followed — additional reconnaissance of the coastal zone and demining.

=== Landings in Crimea ===
On 24 August 2023, Ukraine’s Independence Day, a group of reconnaissance fighters from the “Timur Special Unit” landed at Cape Tarkhankut in western Crimea. During the combat mission on the temporarily occupied peninsula, special forces destroyed a building and several vehicles used by Russian occupiers with a grenade launcher. At that time, for the first time in nearly 10 years of Russian occupation, the Ukrainian flag was raised on the peninsula.

=== “Boyko Towers” ===
Fighters from the Timur Special Unit took part in returning control of the so-called “Boyko towers” — offshore gas and oil drilling platforms near Crimea. According to Timur, preparation for the “Boyko Towers” operation took about two weeks. Russian troops were present on all the platforms, but they left these facilities as Ukrainian units approached.

=== “Red Dnipro” ===
In Nova Kakhovka, fighters of the Tymur Special Unit struck an enemy command post, two combat vehicles, eliminated 12 Russian servicemen, and captured one prisoner. The purpose of the raid was reconnaissance and additional reconnaissance of enemy firing positions.

=== Kinburn ===
On 9 August 2024, as a result of a raid on the Russian-occupied Kinburn Spit, six pieces of enemy armored equipment were destroyed and about three dozen occupiers were eliminated. The landing operation was carried out by the units “Khymera,” “Aratta,” “Stuhna,” “Paragon,” Sibir Battalion and Terror Battalion as part of the Tymur Special Unit of the HUR of the Ministry of Defense of Ukraine.

=== Vovchansk Aggregate Plant ===
On 24 September 2024, the commander of the HUR special unit Timur reported to the head of the HUR of the Ministry of Defense of Ukraine, Kyrylo Budanov, about the successful completion of the operation to liberate the Vovchansk Aggregate Plant. The operation was carried out by special groups of the “Timur Special Unit”: “Stuhna,” “Paragon,” RDK, “Junger,” BDC, and “Terror.” Fighters of “Timur” conducted systematic clearing of the plant buildings, constantly engaging in close combat with Russian servicemen in dense urban development. In some cases, Ukrainian special forces engaged the enemy in hand-to-hand combat. After clearing all 30 buildings of the aggregate plant, the facility was transferred under the control of the Armed Forces of Ukraine.

=== Kupiansk District ===
Fighters of the “Bratstvo” unit as part of the Tymur Special Unit, with the support of the 77th Separate Airmobile Brigade of the Armed Forces of Ukraine, liberated and cleared the settlement of Kruhliakivka in Kupiansk district from Russian occupiers. The operation to regain control of the settlement, important for the defense of Kupiansk, lasted from 7 to 14 October 2024.

=== Defense of Pokrovsk ===
In November 2025, forces of the “Timur Special Unit” of the HUR of the Ministry of Defense of Ukraine carried out an operation in one of the districts of the city of Pokrovsk in Donetsk Oblast, important from the standpoint of front-line logistics. After a parachute-less landing in the Pokrovsk direction, fighters of the Tymur Special Unit broke through a ground corridor and reinforced the reconnaissance group in the combat zone.

=== Black Hawks ===
A special operation carried out in November 2025 in the Pokrovsk direction by fighters of the “Black Winter Group” unit as part of the “Timur Special Unit” of the HUR of the Ministry of Defense of Ukraine. As part of the mission, HUR aviation was used for rapid deployment of landing forces to strengthen defense in a designated sector of the front.

=== Kakhovka Reservoir ===
In November 2025, fighters of the "Bratstvo" unit, part of the Tymur Special Unit of the HUR of the Ministry of Defense of Ukraine, conducted a successful reconnaissance and sabotage operation in the “gray zone” on the territory of the former Kakhovka Reservoir. During the operation in the "Velyki Kuchuhury" area, located 7 kilometers from the shoreline, HUR special forces detected and eliminated Russian occupiers.

== Charity activities ==
Mothers and wives of servicemen of the "Tymur Special Unit" created the Charity Foundation "She Protects". The Foundation organizes mass cultural and educational events, provides psychological, legal, and material support to the families of servicemen.
