= NOBODY Battalion =

Ukrainian military volunteer unit

- Загін Спеціальних Дій «NOBODY» ГУР МОУ
- NOBODY insignia
- Founded: February 2022
- Country: Ukraine
- Branch: Main Directorate of Intelligence: Tymur Special Unit
- Type: Spetsnaz
- Role: Reconnaissance, counteroffensive and sabotage
- Mottos: "Nobody and no bodies"
- Engagements: Russo-Ukrainian War; Russian invasion of Ukraine; Northern Ukraine campaign; Battle of Kyiv; Eastern Ukraine campaign; Battle of Horlivka; Battle of Avdiivka; Battle of Bakhmut; Battle of Vovchansk; Southern Ukraine campaign; Dnieper campaign; Zaporizhzhia Nuclear Power Plant crisis; Snake Island campaign; Western Russia campaign

The Special Forces "NOBODY" Battalion is a Ukrainian military unit, part of the spetsnaz units of the Main Directorate of Intelligence of Ukraine formed in 2022 as a response to the Russian invasion of Ukraine.

== History ==
The unit was established in 2022 and took part in the Battle of Kyiv in the initial stages of the Russian invasion of Ukraine. It has also taken part in the Battle of Avdiivka, Battle of Vovchansk, raids on Nova Kakhovka, Enerhodar, "Boyko's towers", the Battle of Bakhmut, Battle of Horlivka and on the islands near Kherson.

In 2022, the battalion together with other units of the took part in the Snake Island campaign to liberate the island. The battalion stormed the landing site on the island in an armored personnel carrier and struck Russian forces using night vision devices and high tech weapons. The battalion uses Teledyne FLIR Black Hornet Nano for sabotage and reconnaissance actions, as they are very small and silent and hence are used for reconnaissance and intelligence gathering. The battalion also specializes in the recovery of the bodies of the fallen personnel, during one such incident two battalion personnel engaged a whole group of Wagnerites. The soldier's body had been buried due to artillery strikes and the personnel had to perform many sorties to recover it, sometimes coming 5 meters close to Russian forces and then promptly killed or wounded the entire group of Wagnerites.

In the aftermath of the Battle of Enerhodar, the battalion conducted several landing attempts near the Zaporizhzhia Nuclear Power Plant of which some were successful and others weren't, overall the operation was a failure for the Ukrainian forces and a large number of operatives of the battalion were wounded and chased away by Russian Ka-52 helicopter and had to evacuate on damaged boats for a duration of about 4 hours. As part of the Dnieper campaign, the battalion conducted an amphibious raid on the left bank of the Dnieper, behind Russian lines in Nova Kakhovka, during the raid, the battalion destroyed a BTR-82A, a Russian command post and killed 10-11 Russian soldiers, the reaction of the Russian forces provided information about the strength and numbers of the Russian troops stationed there. The battalion conducted its next operations on Ostriv Velykyi Potomkin, directly engaging with personnel of GRU and bringing the Island under 70% Ukrainian control from the previously 80% Russian control. The battalion in coordination with 24th Mechanized brigade took part in the recontinued Battle of Horlivka capturing the territory that had been occupied since 2014. The battalion also saw heavy combat during the Battle of Bakhmut in April 2023 destroying several groups of Wagnerite troops.

In September 2023, it conducted training as a part of Tymur Special Unit In 2024, it became a part of Tymur Special Unit. On 11 September 2024, the Nobody battalion, together with other units of the HUR conducted a raid off the coast of Crimea and shot down a Russian Su-27SM aircraft of the 43rd Separate Naval Aviation Regiment with the help of a MANPADS.

== Weaponry ==
| Model | Image | Origin | Type | Number | Details |
Personal Weapons
| Heckler & Koch MG5 | | Germany | General-purpose machine gun | | |
| AK-47 | | Soviet Union | Assault Rifle | | |
| AKM | | Soviet Union | Assault Rifle | | |
| AK-74 | | Soviet Union | Assault Rifle | | |
| FN SCAR | | Belgium | Assault Rifle | | |
Unmanned Aerial Vehicles
| Teledyne FLIR Black Hornet Nano | | Norway | MAV | | |
