= Paragon Company (Ukraine) =

Ukrainian volunteer military unit

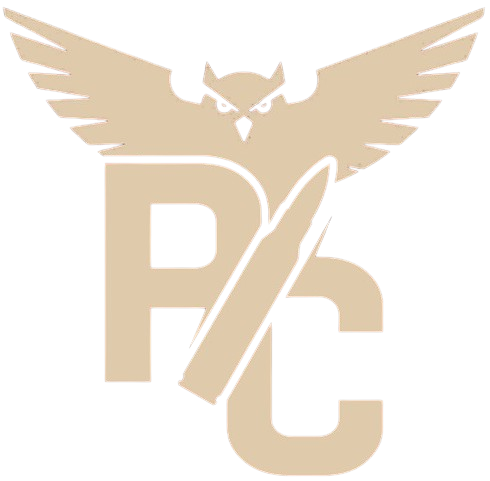
- Paragon insignia
- Founded: February 2022
- Country: Ukraine
- Branch: Main Directorate of Intelligence: Tymur Special Unit
- Type: Spetsnaz
- Role: Reconnaissance, counteroffensive and sabotage
- Size: Detachment
- Engagements: Russo-Ukrainian War; Russian invasion of Ukraine; Northern Ukraine campaign; Battle of Kyiv; Eastern Ukraine campaign; Battle of Horlivka; Battle of Avdiivka; Battle of Bakhmut; Battle of Vovchansk; Southern Ukraine campaign; 2023 Ukrainian counteroffensive; Dnieper campaign; Zaporizhzhia Nuclear Power Plant crisis; Snake Island campaign; Sudanese civil war; Battle of Khartoum

The Special Forces "Paragon Company" Detachment is a Ukrainian military volunteer unit, part of the spetsnaz units of the Main Directorate of Intelligence of Ukraine formed in 2022 as a response to the Russian invasion of Ukraine. It is a part of Tymur Special Operations Detachment.

== History ==
The company has taken part in the Northern Ukraine campaign, Snake Island campaign, the 2022 Kherson counteroffensive, 2023 Ukrainian counteroffensive, as well as special operations during the Battle of Bakhmut, Battle of Klishchiivka, Battle of Horlivka and the Battle of Avdiivka, it also took part in the seizure of Boyko's Towers and amphibious raids in Crimea and across the Dnieper. It has also partook in demining operations.

During the Northern Ukraine campaign, the company conducted clearance operations and was able to capture six soldiers by using fake grenades. The Paragon Company took part in combat in the Vysokopillia Raion during the 2022 Kherson counteroffensive and later conducted assaults on the islands of the Kherson region and the Snake Island. During the 2023 Ukrainian counteroffensive, the company used Hummers to assault Russian positions, the company also used Chinese lanterns to make it appear as assault mines for Russian troops so they may attack them and give away their positions. It also took part in the Battle of Pyatykhatky. During the Dnieper campaign, the company was able to seize Ostriv Velykyi Potomkin. In Horlivka, the company conducted extensive mortar strikes and made way for the seizure of Russian positions causing Russians to pull out their reserves. On 29 January 2024, the Company was conducting live fire training. During the Battle of Vovchansk in the 2024 Kharkiv offensive, it provided fire support to other units using "wild hornet" UAVs and also took part in the liberation of Vovchansk Aggregate Plant. On 8 August 2024, the company along with other units conducted a raid on Kinburn spit killing 30 Russian personnel and destroying six pieces of equipment. In December 2024, its operators conducted several kamikaze drone strikes in southern Ukraine killing many russian personnel as well as destroying fortified positions and military vehicles. On 29 March 2025, the company held the Kyiv kickboxing championship.

It has also taken part in the Battle of Khartoum as part of the Sudanese civil war.

== Structure ==
- Management & Headquarters
- 1st Platoon
- 2nd Platoon
- Armoured Unit
- UAV Unit
- Commandant Platoon
