= Ukrainian occupation of Belgorod Oblast =

Ukrainian occupation of Belgorod Oblast could refer to:

- 2023 Belgorod Oblast incursions
- 2025 Belgorod Oblast incursion
