= Smorodino =

Smorodino Смородино
- Selo
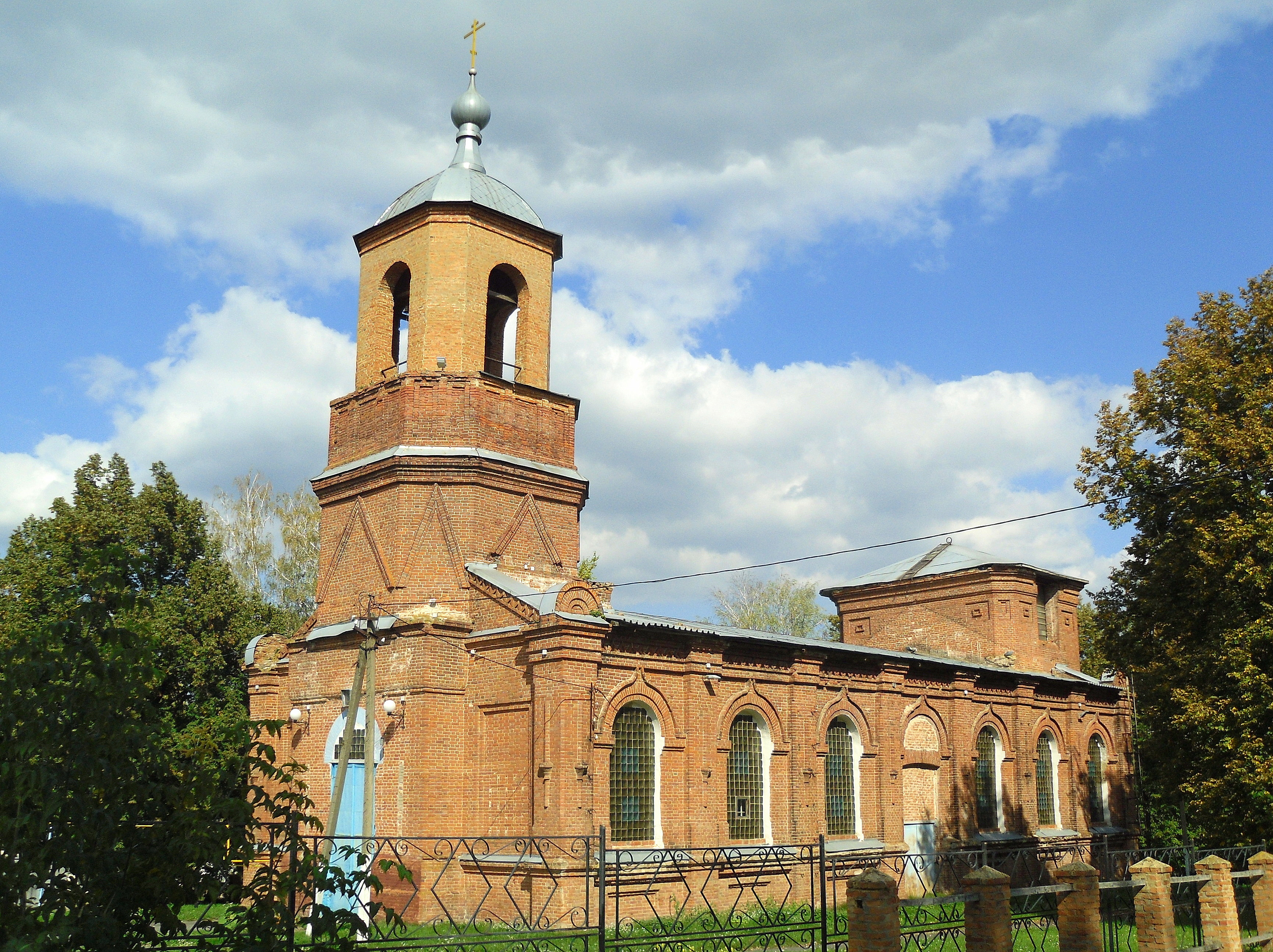

- Location within Belgorod Oblast Location within Russia
- Coordinates: 50°36′N 35°30′E
- Country: Russia
- Region: Belgorod Oblast
- District: Grayvoronsky District
- Time zone: UTC+3:00

Smorodino (Russian: Смородино) is a rural locality (a selo) and the administrative center of Smorodisnkoye Rural Settlement, Grayvoronsky District, Belgorod Oblast, Russia. The population was 633 as of 2010. There are 11 streets.

== Geography ==
Smorodino is located 22 km northwest of Grayvoron (the district's administrative centre) by road. Dorogoshch is the nearest rural locality.
