= Romanian Battlegroup Getica =

- Grupul Român de Luptă "Getica"
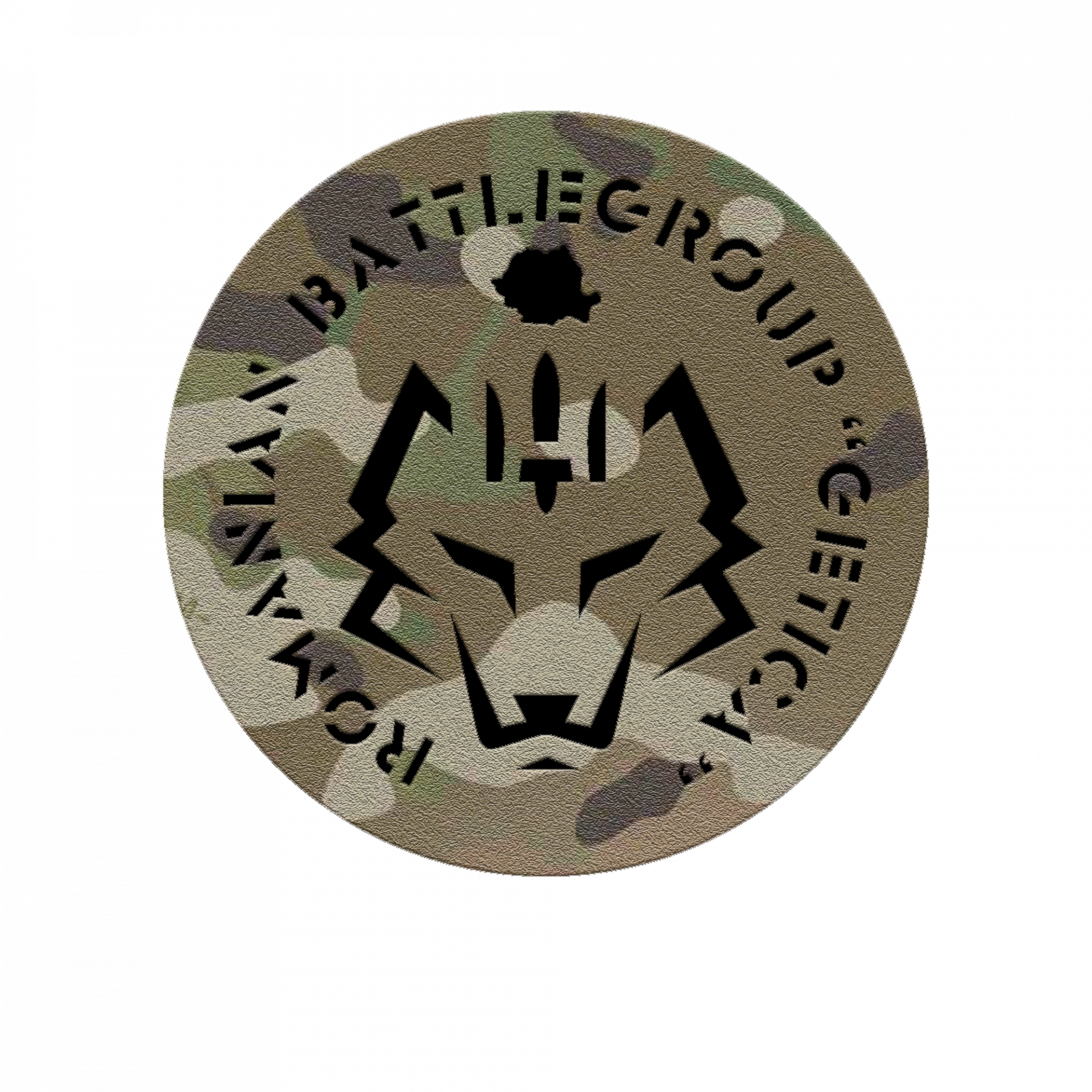
- Unit insignia
- Active: September 2023 – present
- Allegiance: Ukraine
- Type: Light infantry
- Role: Close-quarters battle Counterintelligence; Drone warfare Maneuver warfare Raiding; Reconnaissance; Urban warfare
- Size: Battalion
- Part of: International Legion for the Defence of Ukraine
- Engagements: Russian invasion of Ukraine: March 2024 western Russia incursion; 2024 Kursk offensive
- Website: https://rolegiongetica.info

Commanders
- Current commander: "Getotac"

The Romanian Battlegroup Getica (Romanian: Grupul Român de Luptă "Getica") is a light infantry pro-Ukraine volunteer battalion unit fighting in the Russian invasion of Ukraine. It is made up of citizens from Romania and Moldova.

== History ==
The Romanian Battlegroup Getica was created in September 2023 as part of the International Legion for the Defence of Ukraine. Battlegroup Getica claims to have originated as a unit of Romanian Ukrainians that has since expanded to accept citizens from Romania and Moldova who are motivated "to keep Russia as far away from Romania and Moldova's borders as possible". Each member of the unit has a monthly salary of 3,000 Euros. The unit claimed that they were engaged in a disinformation campaign against Russian intelligence, reporting that they were spending the war as an auxiliary force in Mykolaiv "giving the impression that we weren't doing much for the war effort" when in reality they were planning for incursions into Russia for months.

The battlegroup is led by a Romanian man who goes by the callsign "Getotac". The unit was involved in an incursion into Russian territory from Ukraine in the woods to the northwest of the town of Grayvoron. On March 20, Getica reported to Romanian media that they were aware that Russian authorities have a warrant out to find them, as the Russian ministry of the interior "arrested" 700 foreign volunteers in absentia for being "mercenaries," Getica joked that they went to police stations in Russia but found no one to turn themselves in to. They also reported that one of their members, "Rabbit" engaged in "several hours" of combat alone to protect wounded members of the battlegroup. The Russian embassy in Bucharest claims that 784 Romanians have volunteered to fight in Ukraine, and that 349 have been killed. The Romanian Ministry of Internal Affairs denied the report, claiming it is a Russian disinformation campaign.

Radu Hossu, a Romanian milblogger who earned the Ukrainian Order of Merit III Class for his efforts mobilizing Romanian support and fundraisers for Ukraine, also helped gather funds for the Battlegroup though he never became a member of Getica. In March 2024, Hossu reported that the unit was fighting in the woods in Belgorod to disable Russian military equipment, and not to occupy the Oblast. Hossu also reported that the battlegroup specializes in anti-tank warfare, artillery observation, counterintelligence, CQB/CQC in urban areas, drone warfare, gathering field intelligence, maneuver warfare, raiding with small unit tactics, and reconnaissance. The unit has yet to take any fatalities as of March 21, 2024.
