= Kozinka, Belgorod Oblast =

Kozinka Козинка
- Selo
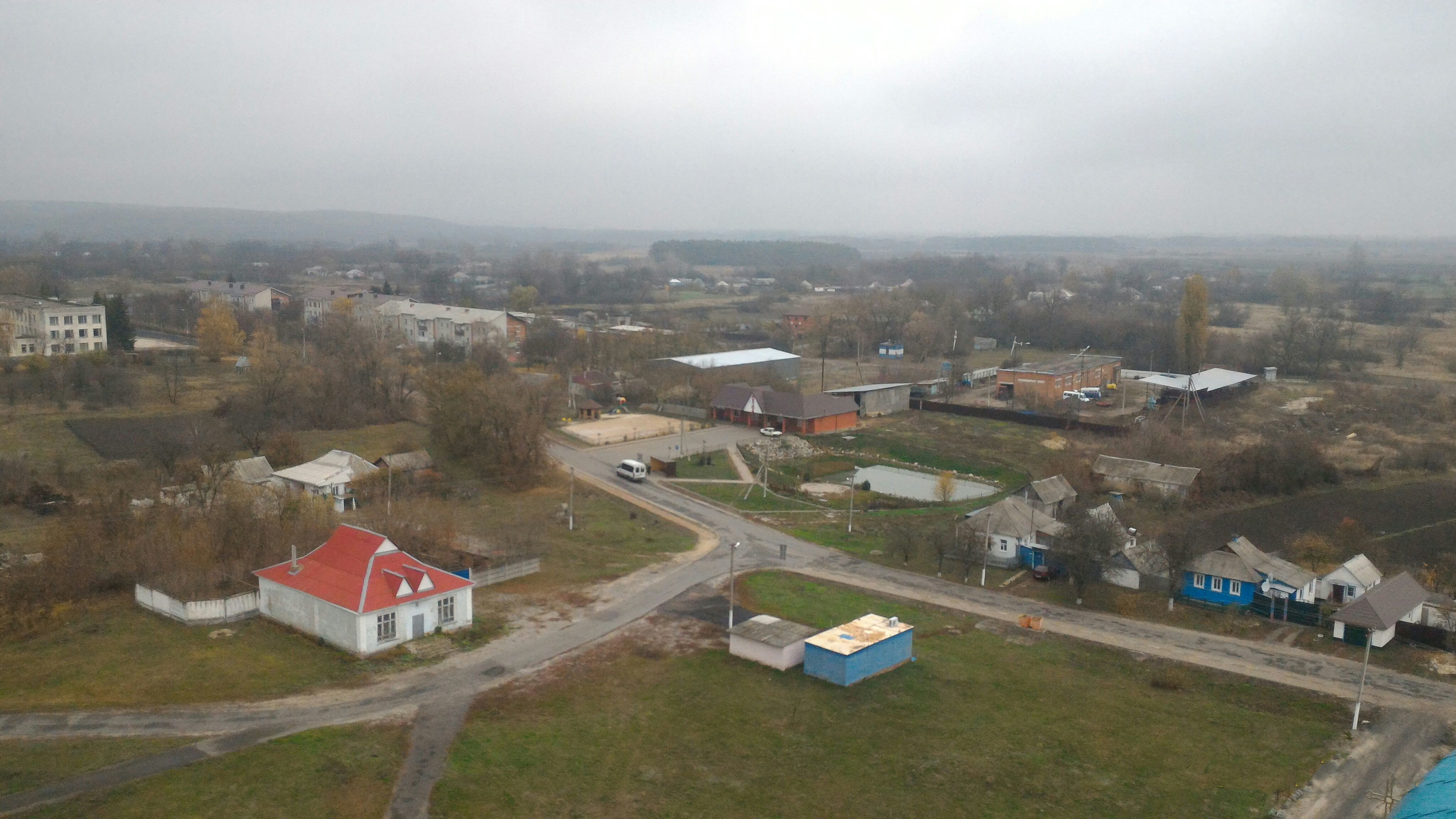
- View of the center of the village in 2019
- Interactive map of Kozinka
- Location within Belgorod Oblast Location within Russia
- Coordinates: 50°27′41″N 35°36′09″E
- Country: Russia
- Federal subject: Belgorod Oblast
- District: Grayvoronsky District
- Time zone: UTC+3:00

Kozinka (Russian: Кози́нка) is a rural locality (a selo) and the administrative center of Kozinskoye Rural Settlement, Grayvoronsky District, Belgorod Oblast, Russia. The population was 1,097 as of 2010.

In 2023, the village was attacked and briefly occupied by pro-Ukrainian forces during the Russian invasion of Ukraine. During the March 2024 western Russia incursion, Kozinka was practically destroyed by Russian bombing.

== Geography ==
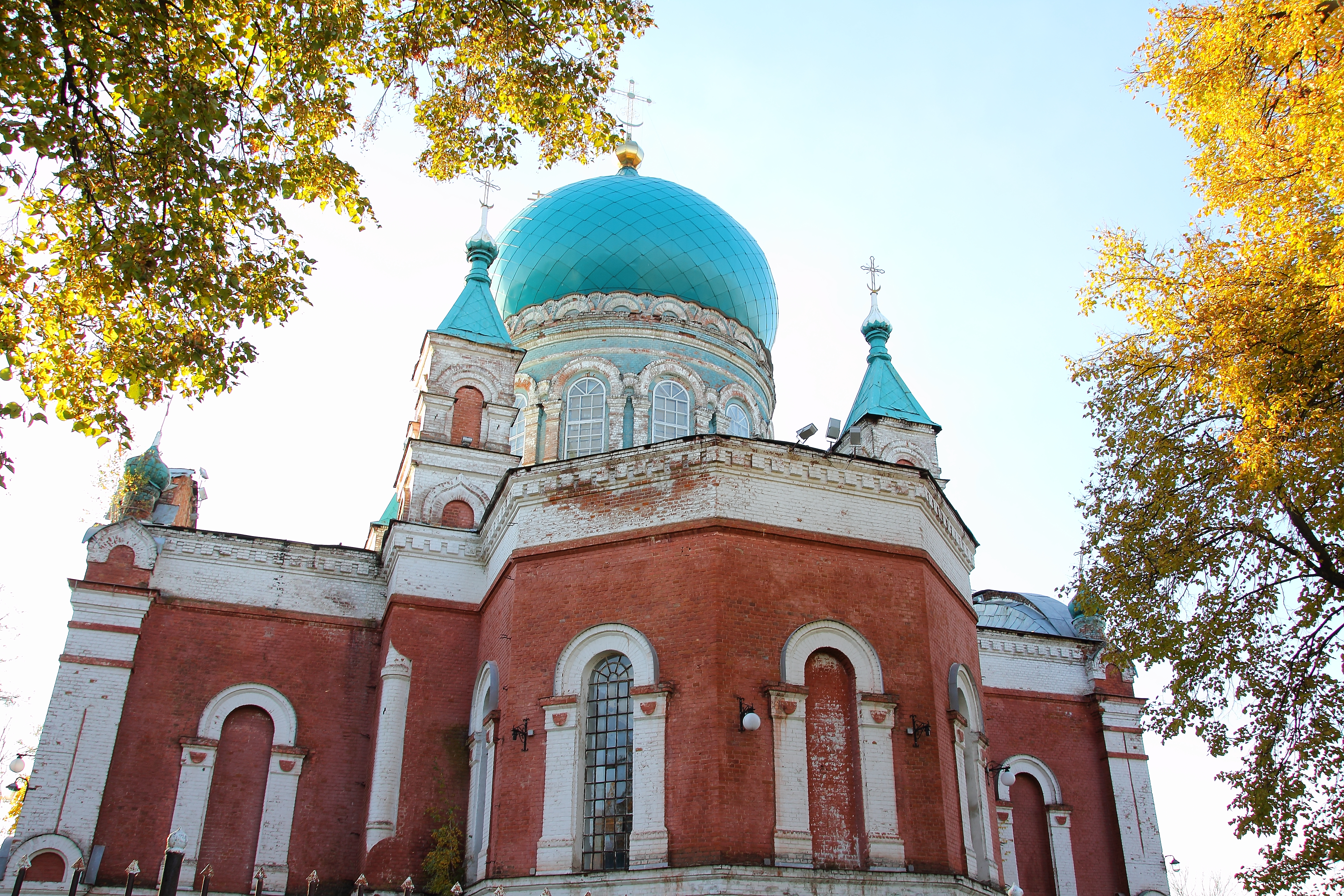
The Church of John the Apostle in Kozinka is registered as a cultural heritage site by the Russian Ministry of Culture. Photo from 2014.

Kozinka is located 12 km southwest of Grayvoron (the district's administrative centre) by road. Glotovo is the nearest rural locality.

== History ==
A historical source testifies that the year 1663 is listed as the date of foundation of the settlement Verbovoye. Later, the Cherkasy (Little Russians) who arrived and settled there renamed the village Kozinka. According to archaeological finds, the village has a more ancient history, as evidenced by the arrowheads found in the left-bank part of the village, belonging to the Scythian culture.

In 1896, in honor of the accession and marriage of Emperor Nicholas II, the village's inhabitants began the construction of a church in the name of John the Apostle.

=== 2023–24 incursions ===
A map of the 2023 incursion into Belgorod Oblast by anti-Putin Russian militants on its first day, 22 May. Frontlines and control of settlements are approximate and based on both Russian and militant sources.

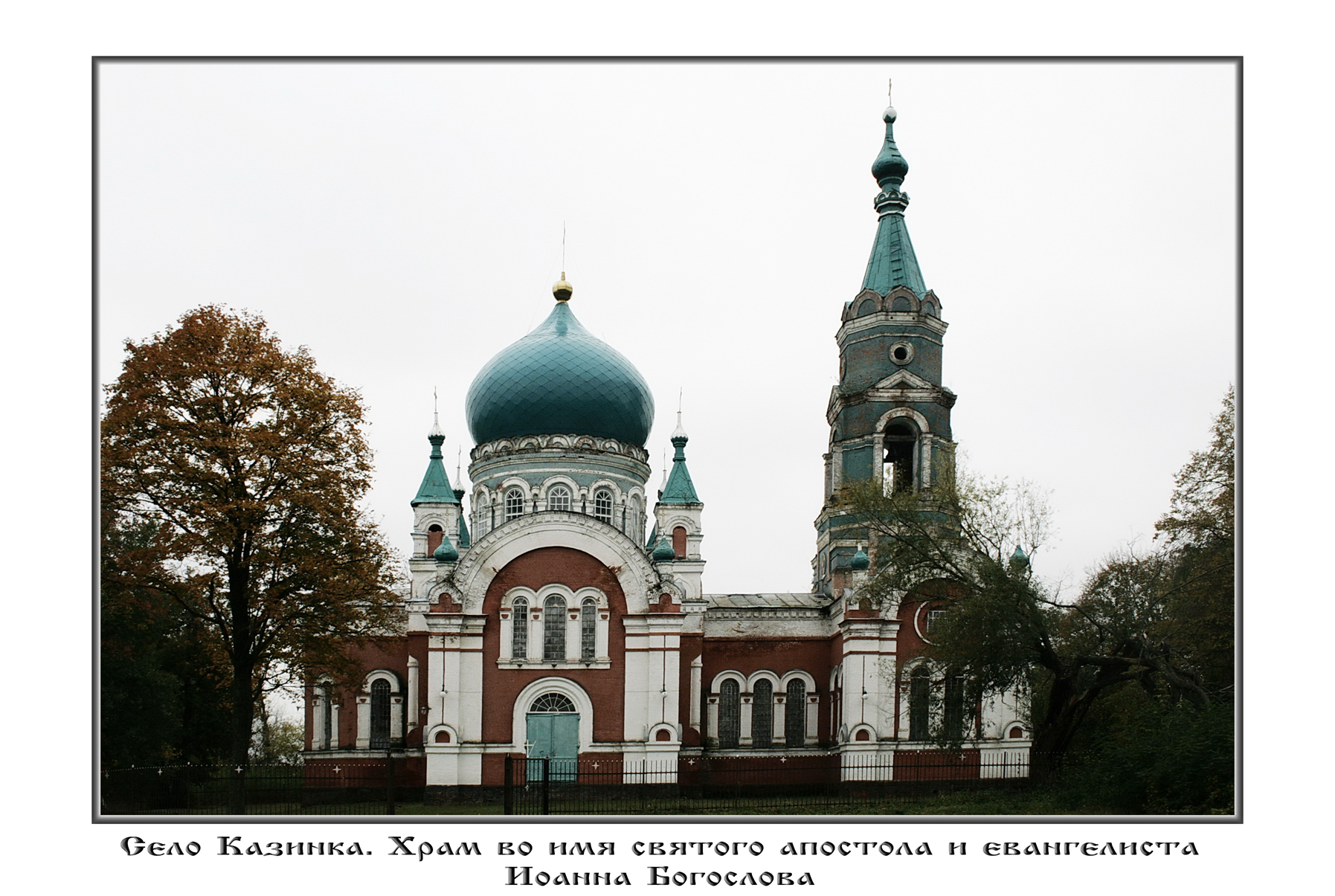
The church

In May 2023, during the Russian invasion of Ukraine, the governor of Belgorod Oblast, Vyacheslav Gladkov, said that Ukrainian "sabotage groups" entered Grayvoronsky District. Ukrainian media reported that the cross-border excursion was by Russian rebel opposition groups, the Russian Volunteer Corps and the Freedom of Russia Legion. The militants claimed to have captured the villages of Kozinka and Gora-Podol. They were later forced out of the villages.

In March 2024, during an incursion from Ukraine, the Siberian Battalion raised its flag in Kozinka, together with the Russian Volunteer Corps. On 20 March 2024, the Russian defence ministry claimed that pro-Kremlin forces had "fully cleared" Kozinka from the "militants", killing 650 of them with "air strikes and artillery fire." German milblogger Julian Roepke assessed that the Russian military had air-dropped high-explosive FAB-500 bombs in its efforts. Kozinka was practically destroyed by Russian bombing. According to a villager, "There is not a single whole house left" in Kozinka.
