= Poroz =

Poroz Пороз
- Village
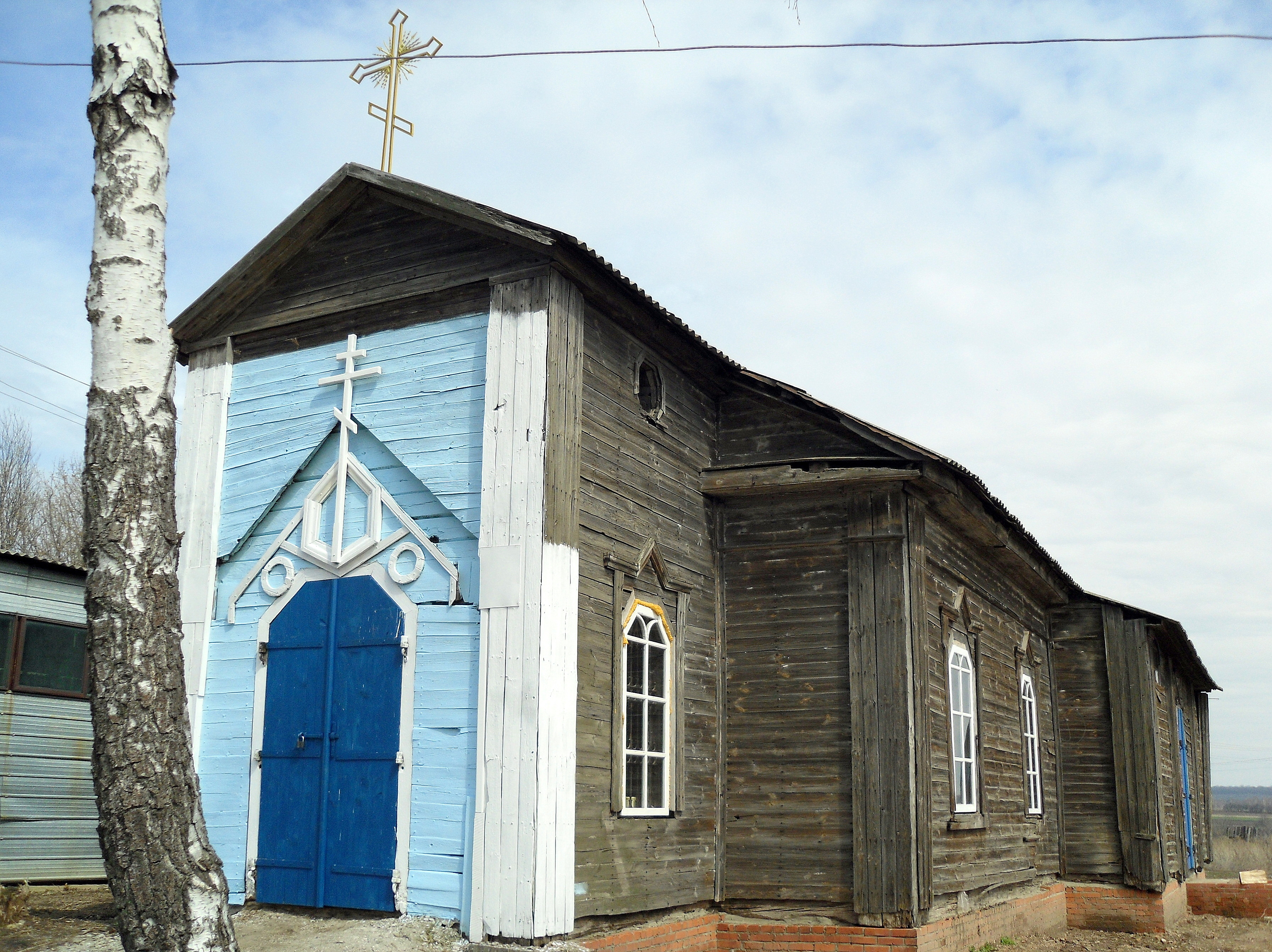
- A church
- Interactive map of Poroz
- Location of Poroz Poroz (Russia)
- Coordinates: 50°34′39″N 35°27′27″E
- Country: Russia
- Federal subject: Belgorod Oblast
- Administrative district: Grayvoronsky District

Population (2010 Census)
  - Total: 315
  - Estimate (2010): 315 (0%)
- Time zone: UTC+3 (MSK)
- Postal code: 309393
- OKTMO ID: 14632444111

Poroz (Russian: Пороз) is a village in Grayvoronsky Municipal District, Belgorod Oblast, Russia, about 2.8 kilometres (1.7 mi) northeast of the Russia–Ukraine border.

== Geography ==
The village is located in the southwest of Belgorod Oblast, in the southwestern part of the Central Russian Upland, west of the 14K-14 motorway, at a distance of about 16 kilometres (9.9 mi) kilometres (in a straight line) northwest of the town of Grayvoron, the administrative centre of the district. The absolute height is 173 metres above sea level.

== History ==
=== Russo-Ukrainian War ===
On the morning of 10 August 2024, a video began to circulate on the Internet showing that Armed Forces of Ukraine had likely entered and raided Poroz during the August 2024 Kursk Oblast incursion.
