= Novostroyevka-Pervaya =

Novostroyevka-Pervaya Новостроевка-Первая
- Selo
- Location within Belgorod Oblast Location within Russia
- Coordinates: 50°26′N 35°44′E
- Country: Russia
- Region: Belgorod Oblast
- District: Grayvoronsky District
- Time zone: UTC+3:00

Novostroyevka-Pervaya (Russian: Новостроевка-Первая) is a rural locality (a selo) and the administrative center of Novostroyevskoye Rural Settlement, Grayvoronsky District, Belgorod Oblast, Russia. The population was 646 as of 2010. There are 2 streets.

== Geography ==
Novostroyevka-Pervaya is located 8 km southeast of Grayvoron (the district's administrative centre) by road. Grayvoron is the nearest rural locality.
