= Special Unit "1514" =

Belarusian special-purpose unit “1514”
- Беларускае падраздзяленне спецыяльнага прызначэння «1514
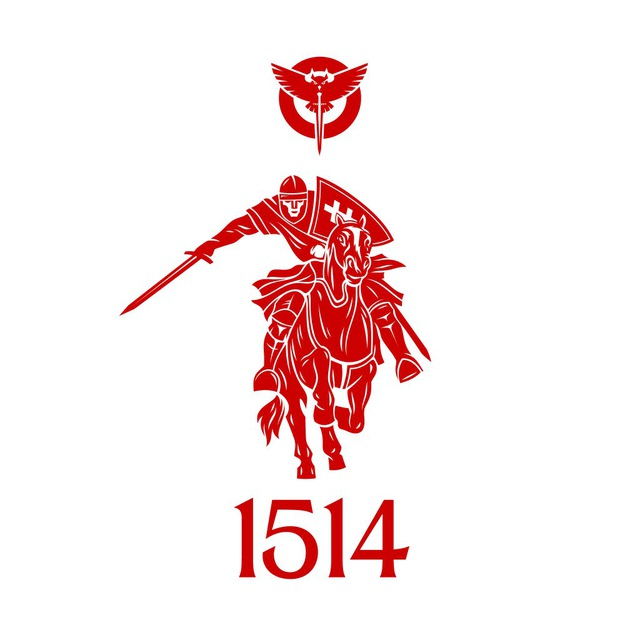
- Insignia
- Founded: 8 September 2024
- Country: Ukraine
- Branch: Main Directorate of Intelligence: Tymur Special Unit
- Type: Spetsnaz
- Role: Reconnaissance, counteroffensive and sabotage
- Engagements: Russo-Ukrainian War; Russian invasion of Ukraine

Commanders
- Current commander: Andrei Tratseuski

The Belarusian special-purpose unit “1514” is part of the Tymur Special Unit of the Main Directorate of Intelligence of the Ministry of Defence of Ukraine.

Commander Andrei Tratseuski is one of the founders of the Belarusian Volunteer Corps. In the past, he was a football fan. According to him, he previously worked in the structure of the Belarusian Ministry of Defense in a civilian position, where he was responsible for supplying food to military units in Minsk and the Minsk region.

== History ==
The announcement about the creation of the unit was published in December 2024. Formally, the unit was established on the Day of Belarusian Military Glory (September 8), the anniversary of the Battle of Orsha, which took place in 1514.

During the spring 2025 operation on the Kupiansk sector of the front, conducted by Belarusian and Ukrainian fighters of the Tymur Special Unit of the Main Intelligence Directorate of the Ministry of Defense of Ukraine, about 600 enemy underground shelters were destroyed or damaged, along with 9 field ammunition depots and 8 crossings. Fighters of the special-purpose unit “1514” also took part in the operation.

In autumn 2025, fighters of unit “1514” carried out a comprehensive combat operation against Russian occupying forces. During the operation, enemy positions were destroyed, and the opponent’s transport and equipment were burned.

In March 2026, it became known that over three months, fighters of the Tymur Special Unit of the Main Intelligence Directorate of the Ministry of Defense of Ukraine, including volunteers from “1514,” conducted a comprehensive defensive operation in the Zaporizhzhia direction. During the operation, special forces fighters killed or wounded more than 300 enemy personnel, and another 39 Russian soldiers were taken prisoner. The actions of the special units made it possible to stabilize the defense on lines favorable to Ukrainian forces and protect Zaporizhzhia.

According to the commander, the unit has no fatalities, but there are seriously wounded. The unit mainly consists of Belarusians, including those who have lived in Ukraine since childhood.
