= Anatoliy Boldyrev =

Russian crystallographer (1883–1946)

- Анатолий Болдырев
- Born: 14 October 1883; Grayvoron
- Died: 25 March 1946 (aged 62); Magadan Oblast
- Education: Mining Institute of Saint-Petersburg
- Scientific career
- Fields: crystallography, mineralogy

Anatolyi Kapitonovich Boldyrev (Russian: Анато́лий Капито́нович Бо́лдырев; 14 October 1883 – 25 March 1946) was a Russian scientist, crystallographer, mineralogist, mathematician, Doctor of Geological and Mineralogical Sciences, and professor at the Leningrad Mining Institute. His research continues to be referenced in the exploration of ore minerals.

== Biography ==
Boldyrev was born on 14 October 1883 in Grayvoron, Kursk Governorate (now Belgorod Oblast, Russian Federation). He worked in the fields of crystallography, mineralogy, and geochemistry. In 1921, he became a professor at the Leningrad Mining institute. In 1925, he proposed new methods for determining the chemical composition of minerals, introduced radiographic techniques, and contributed to the development of crystallographic nomenclature.

== Works ==
=== Monographs ===
- Определитель кристаллов. Т. I, 1-я половина (коллектив авторов). Л.-М., ОНТИ, Гл. ред. геол.-разв. и геодез. лит., 1937.
- Определитель кристаллов. Т. I, 2-я половина (коллектив авторов). Л.-М., Ред. горно-топл. и геол.-развед. лит., 1939.
- Рентгенометрический определитель минералов. Ч.1 (коллектив авторов). Зап. ЛГИ, 1938, т. XI, вып.2.
- Рентгенометрический определитель минералов. Ч.2 (коллектив авторов). Зап. ЛГИ, 1939, т. XIII, вып.1.

=== Books ===
- Основы кристаллографии. Курс лекций, читанных в Ленинградском горном институте в 1924—1925 гг. Л., изд. КУБУЧ, 1926 (литогр.).
- Курс описательной минералогии. Вып. I. Л., Научно-химико-техн. изд. НТО ВСНХ, 1926.
- Курс описательной минералогии. Вып. II. Изд. КУБУЧ, 1928.
- Кристаллография. Л., изд. КУБУЧ, 1930.
- Рабочая книга по минералогии, составленная коллективом авторов, кн. 1 и 2 (частичное авторство и общая редакция).
- Cristallografia. Barcelona-Madrid, 1934. XV, 432 pp.
- Кристаллография. Изд. 3, испр. и доп. Л.-М.-Грозный-Новосибирск., Гос. научно-техн. горно-геолого-нефт. изд-во, 1934, 431 с.
- Курс описательной минералогии, вып. III. Л.-М., ОНТИ НКТП СССР, 1935.
- «Предисловие» (совместно с Б. В. Черныхом) и «Введение к силикатам». В кн.: Курс минералогии. Под ред. А. К. Болдырева, Н. К. Разумовского и В. В. Черныха. ОТИ, 1936.

=== Articles ===
- Основы геометрического учения о симметрии. Зап. СПб. минерал. об-ва, 1907, ч. 45, вып.1.
- Петрография Восточного Мурмана (Лапландия). Зап. АН, 1913, т. XXXI, 8.
- Теория подсчета запасов металла в расшурфованной россыпи. Горн. журн., 1914, кн.7-8.
- Карта главнейших полиметаллических месторождений Русского Алтая (совместно с И. Ф. Григорьевым). Зап. Горн. ин-та, 1926, т. VII.
- Комментарии к работе Е. С. Федорова «Das Kristallreich». Изд. АН, 1926.
- Die chemischen Formeln des Nayagits. Zentralbl. Mineral., 1924, No 24.
- Критические замечания о статье А. Н. Заварицкого «Об оптическом исследовании минералов в сходящемся поляризованном свете». Зап. ВМО, 1924, ч. 52.
- Переход от рентгенограмм кристаллов к циклическим диаграммам W.L.Bragg'а. Зап. ВМО, 1924, ч.52.
- Принципы нового метода кристаллографического диагноза вещества. Зап. ВМО, 1924, ч. 53, вып.2.
- Классификация запасов полезного ископаемого в месторождении. Горн. журн., 1926, No 11.
- Дополнения к статье «О классификации запасов полезного ископаемого в месторождении». Горн. журн., 1927, No 2.
- Объем геохимии как отдельной науки. В сб.: Сообщ. о научно-техн. работах в России. 1928, вып.23.
- Разделение русских вольфаматов железа и марганца на минералогические виды и связь состава природных вольфраматов с их чертой (совместно с Э. Я. Ляски). Зап. ВМО, 1929, ч.58, вып.2.
- Эволюция учения о кристаллическом составе вещества. Зап. ВМО, 1929, ч.58, вып.2.
- Редкоземельные апатиты Лебяжинского рудника и горы Высокой на Урале. Матер. по общ. и прикл. геол., 1930, вып. 142.
- Строение кристаллического вещества. В кн.: Менделеев Д. И. Основы химии, 1931, т. I.
- Классификация, номенклатура и символика 32 видов симметрии кристаллов (совместно с В. В. Доливо-Добровольским). Зап. Горн. инст., 1934, т. VIII.
- Uber die Bezeichnung polymorpher Modifikationen. Min. Petrogr. Mitt., 1936, Bd.47.
- «Из чего состоят Крымские горы» и «Возраст Крымских гор». Всесоюзная здравница, 1936, 15 октября, No 61; 17 октября, No 63.
- Атомные и ионные радиусы в кристаллах. Тр. Юбилейн. менделеевск. съезда. М.-Л., Изд. АН СССР, 1936.
- Are there 47 or 48 simple forms possible on crystals? Am. Miner., 1936, v.21, No 11.
- Химическая конституция и кристаллическая структура слюд. В кн.: Слюды СССР, Л., ЦНИГРИ, 1937.
- Рентгенометрическое исследования шунгита, антрацита и каменного угля (совместно с Г. А. Ковалевым). Зап. ЛГИ, 1937, т. X, вып. 2.
- Химическая валентность и расширенное понятие об изоморфизме. Применение к формулам слюд. Матер. ЦНИГРИ, 1938, Общ. сер., сб.3.
- Очерки высшей минералогии. Очерк I. Понятие о высшей минералогии и её содержание. Очерк II. История минералогии. Бюлл. журн. «Колыма», 1944, No 1.
- Мировые месторождения золота. Матер. по геол. и полезн. ископ. Северо-Востока СССР, 1946, вып. 2.
- О природе «налетов» на наледях Колымо-Индигирского края (совместно с А. П. Васьковским и Т. А. Ефимовой). Матер. по геол. и полезн. ископ. Северо-Востока СССР, 1946, вып. 2.
