= Belarusian Volunteer Corps =

Ukrainian Interior Ministry special unit

- Беларускі добраахвотніцкі корпус (Belarusian); Білоруський добровольчий корпус (Ukrainian)
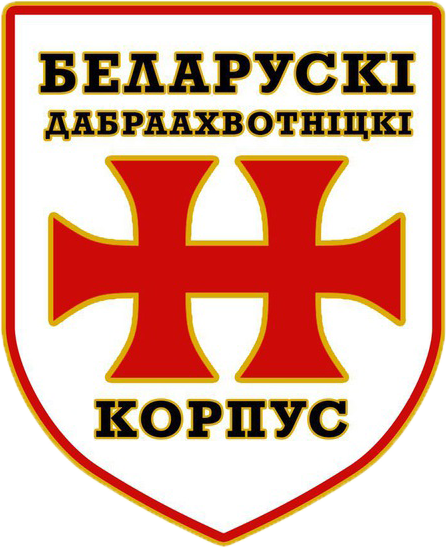
- Founded: 2022 – present
- Country: Ukraine
- Allegiance: Ukraine; Belarusian opposition
- Branch: International Legion of the Defence Intelligence of Ukraine
- Size: ~300
- Part of: Armed Forces of Ukraine
- Engagements: Russian Invasion of Ukraine: 2023 Belgorod Oblast incursions; 2023 Ukrainian counteroffensive

The Belarusian Volunteer Corps (Belarusian: Беларускі добраахвотніцкі корпус) is a military formation of Belarusian volunteers working as part of the Ukrainian Armed Forces, formed in 2022 during the Russian invasion of Ukraine.

== History ==
On 25 December 2022, Belarusian volunteers Ihor "Yanki" Yankov, Andriy "Bezsmertnyi" Trotsevsky and Rodion "Gena" Batulin announced the creation of the Belarusian Volunteer Corps, made up of several different Belarusian units that have been fighting the Russian Army in Ukraine. Trotsevsky, one of the co-founders of the Belarusian Volunteer Corps would later become commander of the Special Unit “1514”.

Previously, the leaders of the new formation were members of various volunteer units. Thus, "Yanki" gathered the commander of the Belarusian unit in the Ukrainian volunteer battalion "Brotherhood", the machine gunner of the Ukrainian group "Tradition and Order", the commander of the international battalion "Titan". Before the start of the full-scale war, Rodion Batulin was known as one of the closest associates of Serhii "Botsman" Korotkyh, later he became a representative of the "Terror" battalion. This formation split from the Kastuś Kalinoŭski Regiment in the summer of 2022 and operated as an independent unit before joining the Belarusian Volunteer Corps.

The unit took part in the 2023 Belgorod Oblast incursions through the Terror Battalion alongside the Russian Volunteer Corps and the Polish Volunteer Corps. The unit took part in the 2023 Ukrainian counteroffensive, fighting along the Donetsk front where the unit has suffered at least one fatality.

In July 2023, there were 70 Belarusians in the unit.

In December 2023, the Ministry of Internal Affairs of Belarus designated the unit as an extremist group.

== See also ==
- Kastuś Kalinoŭski Regiment
- Terror Battalion
- Pahonia Regiment
- Pahonia Detachment
- Tactical group "Belarus"
- International Legion of Territorial Defense of Ukraine
- Russian Volunteer Corps
- Polish Volunteer Corps
