= 6th Special Operations Detachment (Ukraine) =

6th Special Purpose Detachment
- 6 Загін Спеціальних Дій
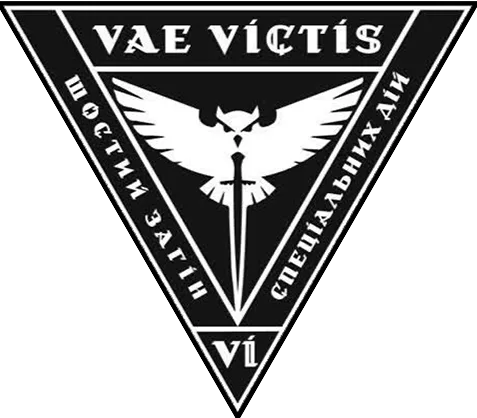
- Battalion insignia
- Founded: 2022
- Country: Ukraine
- Branch: Main Directorate of Intelligence
- Type: Spetsnaz
- Role: Reconnaissance, counteroffensive and sabotage
- Size: Detachment
- Part of: Tymur Special Unit
- Motto: "Woe to the Vanquished"
- Engagements: Russo-Ukrainian War; Russian invasion of Ukraine

The 6th Special Purpose Detachment is a volunteer special operations unit, one of the spetsnaz units of the Main Directorate of Intelligence, the unit was established in 2022. Composed mostly of volunteers from within Ukraine and abroad, the unit conducts special reconnaissance, sabotage, and other covert operations. It is a part of the Tymur Special Unit.

== History ==
The 6th Special Operations Detachment is a highly secretive and covert unit of the Tymur Special Unit tasked with the "most difficult tasks" aimed at "instilling fear and terror in the enemy". in June/July 2025, it participated in the repulsion of a major Russian offensive in Sumy Oblast, along with other unit, resulting in the deaths of 334 Russian soldiers and wounding of around 550 more, equivalent to eight infantry companies in number. They entered close quarters combat with Russian forces while attempting to clear their positions. Following the success of the offensive, Russian forces refused to storm the position held by HUR forces.

== Equipment ==
- International MaxxPro – American MRAP armored fighting vehicle
