= Terror Battalion =

Ukrainian Interior Ministry special unit

- Батальён "Тэрор"; Батальйон "Терор"
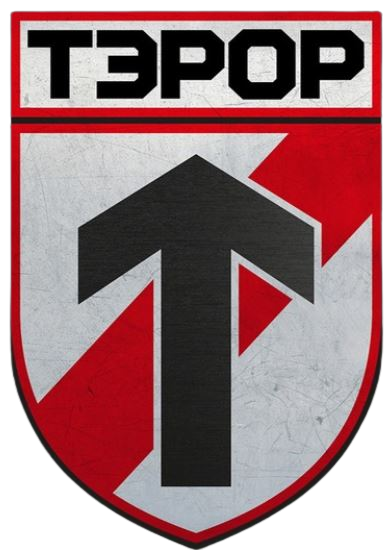
- Founded: August 2022 (Note: As a separate unit.) – November 2024
- Country: Ukraine
- Allegiance: Ukraine; Belarusian opposition
- Part of: Armed Forces of Ukraine
- Patron: Dmytro Apanasovich (call sign "terror")
- Engagements: Russian Invasion of Ukraine: 2023 Belgorod Oblast incursions

Insignia
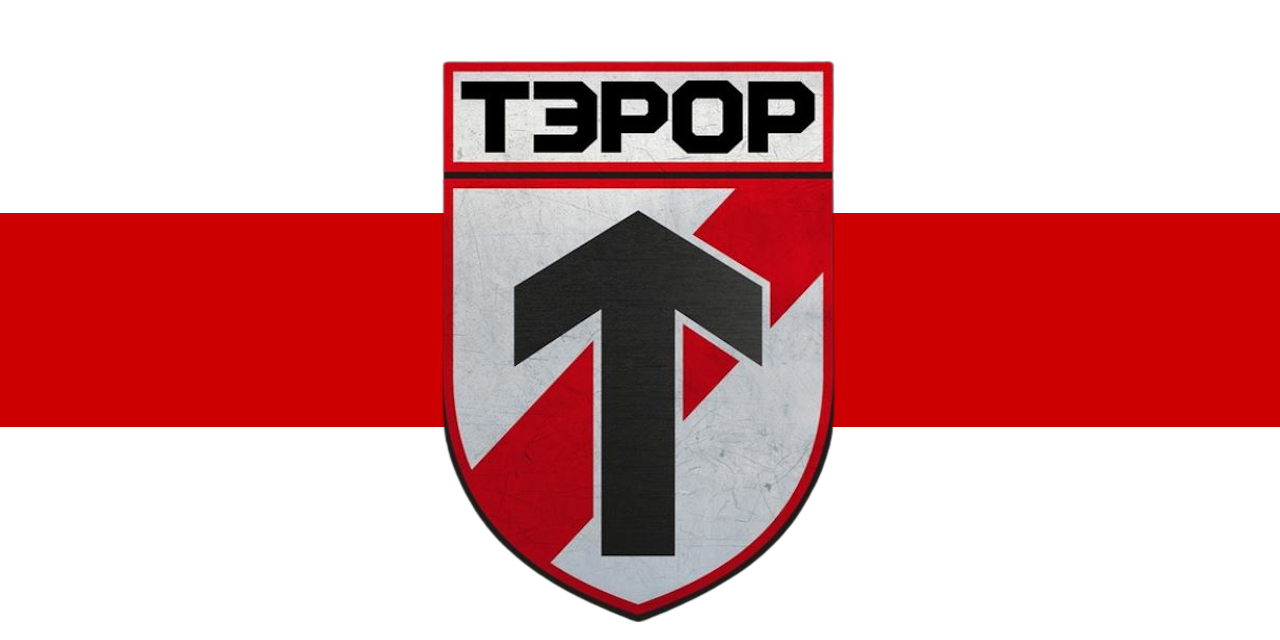
- Flag

The Terror Battalion (Belarusian: Батальён "Тэрор"; Ukrainian: Батальйон "Терор") was a military formation of Belarusian volunteers (formerly a company) fighting in the Russian invasion of Ukraine on the Ukrainian side until November 2024. The unit was named after Dmytro Apanasovich (call sign "terror") who died during the defense of Irpin, and was created in 2022.

== History ==
Zmitser (Dmytro) Apanasovych (Belarusian: Зьміцер Мар'янавіч Апанасовіч) was a soldier of the Ukrainian volunteer battalion Kastus Kalinovsky who went by the call sign "Terror": he died on 24 March 2022, from a combat wound near the city of Irpin. In his honor, a new unit was formed as a part of the Kastuś Kalinoŭski Regiment. In August 2022, the unit's leader was dismissed from the Regiment, leading to the Terror Battalion's separation.

In September 2022, the Ministry of Internal Affairs of the Republic of Belarus recognized the Internet groups of the battalion and other Belarusian military formations in Ukraine as extremist formations.

On 14 November 2022, one of the soldiers of the battalion received an award from Volodymyr Zelenskyy during his visit to liberated Kherson.

On 27 December 2022, the battalion announced its entry into the Belarusian Volunteer Corps as one of its main units.

In November 2024, the unit dissolved. Some of the fighters joined the spetznaz of Main Directorate of Intelligence of Ukraine.

== See also ==
- International Legion of Territorial Defense of Ukraine
- Pahonia Regiment
- Tactical group "Belarus"
