= Battle of Horlivka =

2014 battle in the Donbas war

- Part of the war in Donbas
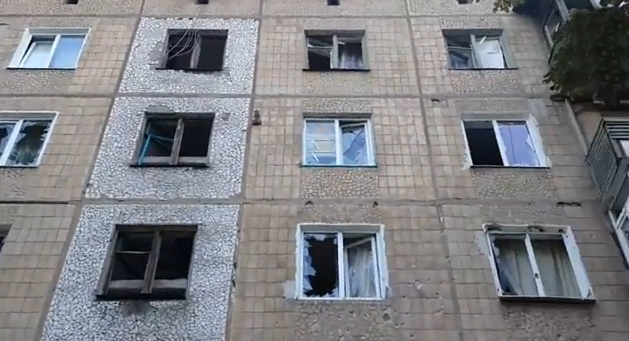
- Damaged building in Horlivka
Date	21 July – 6 September 2014 (1 month, 2 weeks and 2 days)
Location	Horlivka, Donetsk Oblast, Ukraine 48°18′N 38°3′E
Result	DPR victory: Ukrainian forces remain in outskirts of Horlivka

Belligerents
Ukraine	Donetsk People's Republic

Commanders and leaders
Roman Zasukha	Igor Bezler; Sergey "Botsman" Povalyaev

Units involved
Armed Forces of Ukraine: Ukrainian Ground Forces; 72nd Guards Mechanized Brigade	Donbas People's Militia: Russian Orthodox Army; 132nd Motor Rifle Brigade

Strength
≈2,500	≈3,000

Casualties and losses
Unknown	Ukrainian Reports: 7 Confirmed Dead DPR Reports: 5 Confirmed Dead
- 36+ civilians killed

The Battle of Horlivka began when the Armed Forces of Ukraine (AFU) attempted to recapture the city of Horlivka, in Donetsk Oblast, from separatist insurgents affiliated with the Donetsk People's Republic (DPR) on 21 July 2014.

== Background ==
Horlivka is a large city in Donetsk Oblast, north of Donetsk city. Amidst rising unrest across eastern and southern Ukraine, armed men stormed and took control of a police station in Horlivka on 14 April. Soon after this, the men stormed the city administration, and gained effective control over the city for the breakaway Donetsk People's Republic. After DPR forces withdrew from Sloviansk in northern Donetsk Oblast on 5 July, many travelled to Horlivka, which remained under DPR control.

On April 12 at 20:00, the protesters attempted to seize the city's Department of Internal Affairs, they demanded the issue of weapons, but this attempt was stopped by police officers led by the head of the Horlivka police department, Крищенко Андрій Євгенович. On April 14, the protesters occupied the city council and raised the flags of Russia and the Donetsk People's Republic, in addition, the activists managed to take control of the Department of Internal Affairs in Horlivka. Part of the Horlivka police force went over to the side of the DPR. On April 30, the city came under the control of the DPR.

After the withdrawal of the DPR forces from Sloviansk in the north of the Donetsk region on July 5, many activists headed for Horlivka, which remained under the control of the DPR.

On June 14, a Su-24 attack aircraft of the Ukrainian Air Force launched an airstrike on the city's ATC, which housed the headquarters of the supporters of the DPR, after which the plane was shot down.

== Events ==
Starting on 21 July, Ukrainian forces made repeated attempts to enter Mayorsk, a suburb of Horlivka. Light skirmishes were reported across the city. A fighter jet from the Air Force of Ukraine was shot down over Horlivka on 23 July, after it attacked DPR positions in the city.

After a lull, fighting resumed in Horlivka on 27 July. Government forces launched an offensive to recapture the city, and said that they had encircled it. They also said that they had destroyed checkpoints defended by DPR insurgents on the outskirts of the city. DPR leaders said that they maintained control over some positions on the city outskirts. Ukrainian government said the fighting killed at least thirteen people, including two children. 27 July proved to be one of the most tragic in terms of civilian casualties as result of a "Grad" salvo fired at the centre of the town with both sides blaming each other. A spokesman for the government military operation in the Donbas said that DPR forces had fired Grad rockets on civilian areas in an attempt to discredit government forces. DPR commanders in Horlivka said that if government forces did not withdraw from the city, they would kill hostages they had been holding, and also blow up the city's chemical plants. During the fighting, government forces said they killed at least twenty insurgents, and destroyed eight military vehicles on the outskirts of the city.

On the following day, it was reported that seventeen civilians had been killed during the fighting in Horlivka, and that forty-three had been wounded. DPR commander in Horlivka Igor Bezler, nom de guerre "Demon", left the city amidst the near-constant fighting. Government forces tried to encircle the city again on 31 July. Clashes continued over the following days. At least one civilian died on 3 August, whilst 16 were wounded. By 6 August, at least 250 houses in the city had been left without gas service, and many more houses were simply destroyed. On the following day, an artillery shell struck a bus stop, killing five civilians, and wounding ten more. A power station was also destroyed, leaving much of the city without electricity.

DPR forces blew up a bridge that connected the city centre to northern districts on 6 August. This was an attempt to stop Ukrainian forces from advancing on their positions. Heavy fighting continued into 14 August. Chechen fighters that had been manning posts in the city abandoned them on 16 August. Ukrainian forces said that they had once again encircled Horlivka on 18 August. Despite this, fighting continued. A broad counter-offensive by Russian and DPR forces across the Donbas pushed Ukrainian forces back in many areas over the course of late August. During fighting in Horlivka and nearby Ilovaisk on 27 August, Ukrainian forces said that they killed 200 insurgents.

Despite a ceasefire signed on 5 September, DPR forces said that Ukrainian forces were shelling their positions in Horlivka on 6 September. The ceasefire held, nonetheless.

In 2017, the town established a memorial to victims of the conflict. According to the monument erected, over three days the fighting took the lives of 235 civilians, including 22 children. One of the victims, Kristina Zhuk, who was killed with an infant, was widely described in Russian media as "The Madonna of Gorlovka". According to Ukraine, "the shelling was carried out by pro-Russian militants, led by field commander Igor Bezler (Bes), to discredit the Ukrainian Armed Forces." The deaths were then used by Russian propaganda to claim Ukraine's guilt.

== Continued hostilities ==
On 19 February 2021, fierce battles broke out again near Horlivka. According to the Armed Forces of Ukraine, the pro-Russian separatist forces violated the ceasefire five times and received a harsh response from the Armed Forces of Ukraine. Fighting lasted from the 19th to the 21st of February; multiple casualties were reported on both sides for control of the Western Suburb Region of Mayorsk. The fighters of the 503rd separate battalion of the Marine Corps of the Navy of the Armed Forces of Ukraine in the area of the Yuzhnaya mine and the settlement of Toretsk north of Horlivka, inflicted damage on the enemy with return fire. Ukrainian Armed Forces officer Anatoliy "Shtirlits" Shtefan reported that the Ukrainian military killed seven opponents near Horlivka. According to the DPR, five soldiers were killed from their own ranks. The former commandant of Horlivka, Igor Bezler, said that 20 DPR separatists were killed near Horlivka. The personnel of the 18th Sloviansk Brigade also operated here in 2022.

== See also ==
- Outline of the Russo-Ukrainian War
