= Shchetinovka =

Shchetinovka Щетиновка
- Interactive map of Shchetinovka
- Coordinates: 50°26′N 36°10′E
- Country: Russia
- Federal subject: Belgorod Oblast

Population
  - Estimate (2002): 772 )
- Time zone: UTC+3 (MSK)
- Postal code: 308562
- OKTMO ID: 14610488101

Shchetinovka (Russian: Щетиновка) is a rural locality (a selo) and the administrative center of Shchetinovskoye Rural Settlement, Belgorodsky District, Belgorod Oblast, Russia. The population was 906 as of 2010. There are 13 streets.

== Geography ==
Shchetinovka is located 29 km southwest of Maysky (the district's administrative centre) by road. Valkovsky is the nearest rural locality.
