= Gora-Podol =

Gora-Podol Гора-Подол
- Selo
- Interactive map of Gora-Podol
- Location within Belgorod Oblast Location within Russia
- Coordinates: 50°28′N 35°38′E
- Country: Russia
- Federal subject: Belgorod Oblast
- District: Grayvoronsky District
- Time zone: UTC+3:00

Gora-Podol (Russian: Гора-Подол) is a rural locality (a selo) and the administrative center of Gora-Podolskoye Rural Settlement, Grayvoronsky District, Belgorod Oblast, Russia. The population was 1,862 as of 2010. There are 28 streets.

== History ==
=== Russian invasion of Ukraine ===
In May 2023, during the Russian invasion of Ukraine, the governor of Belgorod Oblast, Vyacheslav Gladkov, said that Ukrainian "sabotage groups" entered Grayvoronsky District. Ukrainian media reported that the cross-border excursion was performed by the rebel opposition groups, the Russian Volunteer Corps and the Freedom of Russia Legion. The Freedom of Russia Legion claimed it captured the villages of Kozinka and Gora-Podol. They later got forced out of the villages.

== Geography ==
Gora-Podol is located 2 kilometres (1.2 mi) southwest of Grayvoron (the district's administrative centre) by road. Grayvoron is the nearest rural locality.
