= Maslova Pristan =

Urban locality in Belgorod Oblast, Russia

Coordinates: 50°27′06″N 36°44′40″E

Maslova Pristan (Russian: Ма́слова При́стань) is an urban-type settlement in Shebekinsky District of Belgorod Oblast, Russia. Population: 5,916 (2021 census); 5,819 (2010 census); 5,597 (2002 census); 4,052 (1989 Soviet census).
