= Polish Volunteer Corps =

Ukrainian Interior Ministry special unit

- Polski Korpus Ochotniczy
- Emblem of the Polish Volunteer Corps
- Founded: February 2023
- Disbanded: 2 January 2025 (original form)
- Country: Poland
- Allegiance: Ukraine
- Branch: Ministry of Foreign Affairs of Ukraine
- Part of: International Legion of the Defence Intelligence of Ukraine
- Engagements: Russian Invasion of Ukraine; 2023 Belgorod Oblast incursions

Commanders
- Current commander: Unknown

Insignia
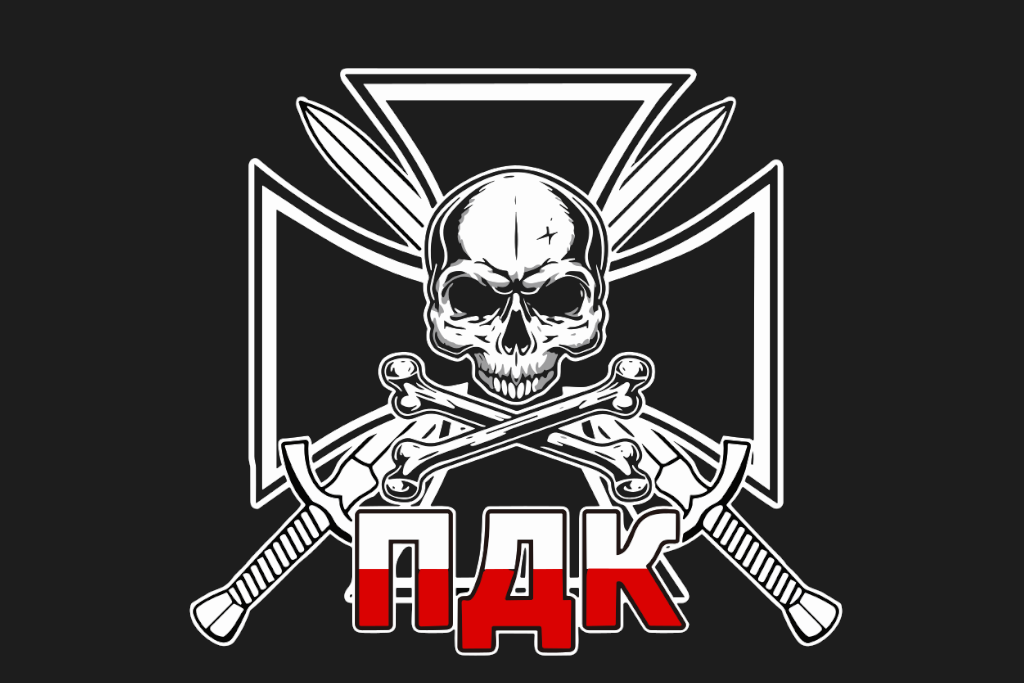
- Flag

The Polish Volunteer Corps (PDK; Polish: Polski Korpus Ochotniczy; Ukrainian: Польський добровольчий корпус, romanized: Polskyi dobrovolchyi korpus, ПДК) is a currently inactive group consisting of international volunteers from Poland fighting on the side of Ukraine during the Russian invasion of the country.

The PDK fought against Russia in the Russian invasion of Ukraine. The PDK also fought in the Belgorod incursions with the Russian Volunteer Corps and Freedom of Russia Legion.

== History ==
The PDK was founded in February 2023. The PDK fought against Russia during the Belgorod incursions. The PDK posted images on Twitter that showed them fighting with the Russian Volunteer Corps and the Freedom of Russia Legion in Belgorod. The PDK stated that no one had been killed during the fighting in Belgorod. The Polish government has denied any ties with the group, and insists that any action by the volunteers is not representative of the Polish government or the Polish armed forces.

On 2 January 2025, the PDK announced on its now-defunct Telegram channel that due to "significant changes" in "every aspect of the war", including "technological leaps" and "structural changes in formations and their management methods", the PDK had to "close [its] operations in their current form". Its membership continues to serve in the Ukrainian military in different capacities.

== Organization ==
The PDK is a special unit for reconnaissance and sabotage, which does not belong to the Ukrainian Foreign Legions, but is likely part of the Ministry of Foreign Affairs of Ukraine.
