= Lozovaya Rudka =

Village in Belgorod Oblast, Russia

Lozovaya Rudka Лозовая Рудка
- Khutor
- Location of Lozovaya Rudka within Russia Lozovaya Rudka (Russia)
- Coordinates: 50.437290°N 35.914980°E
- Country: Russia
- Oblast: Belgorod Oblast
- District: Borisovsky District

Population (2010)
  - Total: 45
- Time zone: UTC+3
- Postal code: 309366

Lozovaya Rudka (Russian: Лозовая Рудка; Ukrainian: Лозова Рудка) is a rural settlement (khutor) in Borisovsky District in Belgorod Oblast of western Russia, at some hundred metres northwards of the Ukrainian border.

On 12 March 2024, during an incursion, Freedom of Russia Legion, Russian Volunteer Corps and Sibir Battalion claimed to have gained control of the settlement, and issued a joint statement the following day (some days before Russian presidential election on 15–17 March 2024) urging "...everyone to leave the cities immediately...".
