= Grayvoron =

Grayvoron Грайворон
- Town
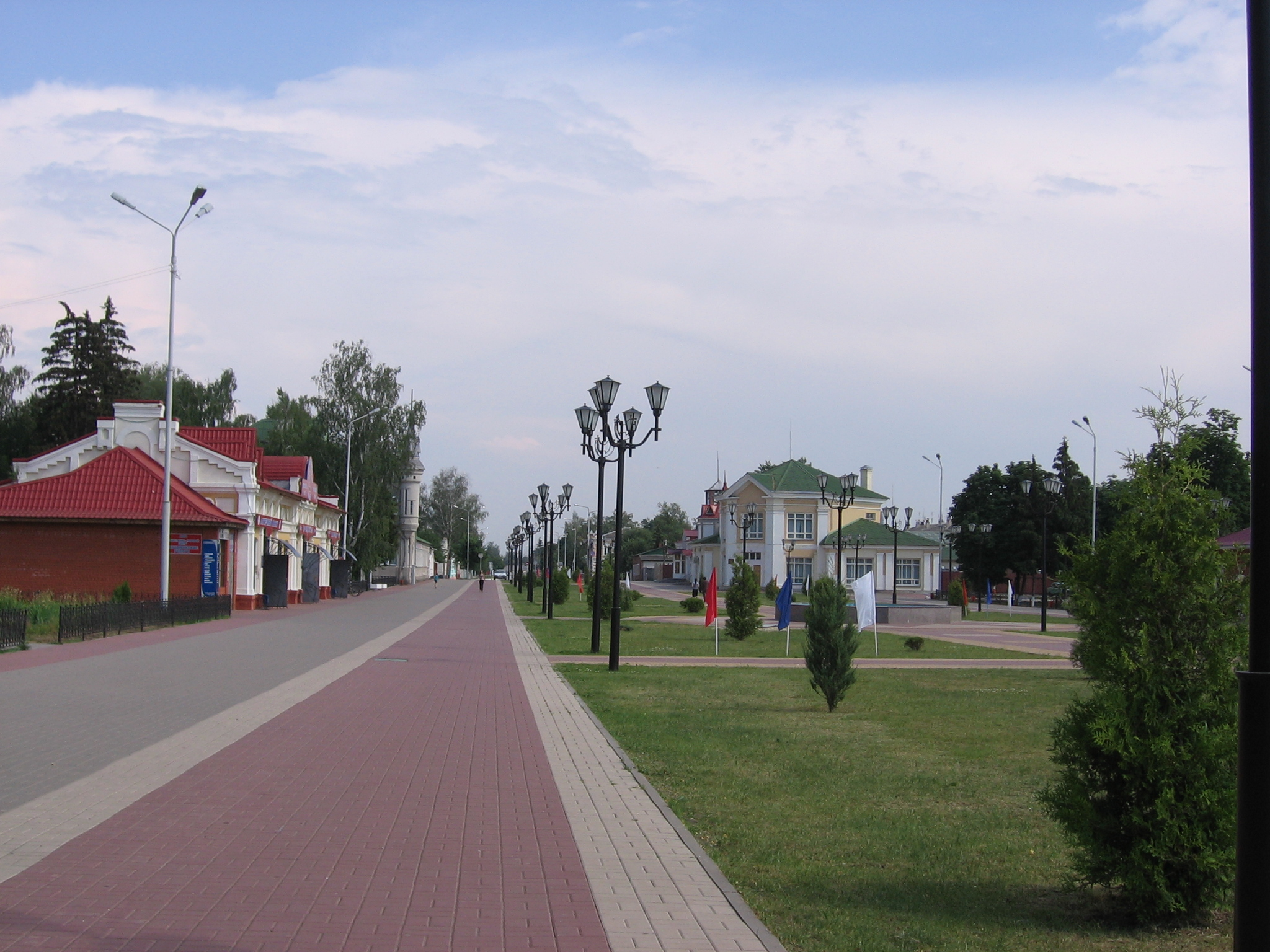
- Lenina Street in central Grayvoron

- Flag Coat of arms
- Interactive map of Grayvoron
- Location of Grayvoron Grayvoron (Russia)
- Coordinates: 50°29′N 35°40′E
- Country: Russia
- Federal subject: Belgorod Oblast
- Administrative district: Grayvoronsky District
- Founded: August 5, 1678
- Town status since: 1838
- Elevation: 130 m (430 ft)

Population (2010 Census)
  - Total: 6,234
  - Estimate (2021): 6,179 (−0.9%)

Administrative status
  - Capital of: Grayvoronsky District

Municipal status
  - Municipal district: Grayvoronsky Municipal District
  - Urban settlement: Grayvoron Urban Settlement
  - Capital of: Grayvoronsky Municipal District, Grayvoron Urban Settlement
- Time zone: UTC+3 (MSK)
- Postal code: 309372
- OKTMO ID: 14632101001
- Website: www.graivoron.ru/nasch_rai/settlement/gorpos/

Grayvoron (Russian: Гра́йворон, pronounced [ˈɡraɪ̯vərən]) is a town and the administrative center of Grayvoronsky District in Belgorod Oblast, Russia. It is on the Vorskla river (a tributary of the Dnieper) and the Grayvoronka river. It was known as Grayvorony until 1838.

== History ==
The sloboda of Grayvorony (Грайвороны) was founded on August 5, 1678. The name can be literally translated as "the scream of the crow". It was granted town status and given its present name in 1838. According to a 1897 census, the town had a population of 6,340, of which 55% were Russians, 43.3% were Ukrainians, 1.1% were Jews, 0.2% were Romani and 0.1% were Poles.

=== Russo-Ukrainian War ===
The area has been the site of several cross border incursions by pro-Ukrainian forces since the 2022 Russian invasion of Ukraine. On 22 May 2023, the Freedom of Russia Legion and Russian Volunteer Corps launched an incursion into parts of Belgorod Oblast, including Grayvoron. On 23 May, Russia said it had routed the militants, pushing the remainder back into Ukraine.

The settlement was once again the scene of fighting in March 2024, amid another incursion.

== Administrative and municipal status ==
Within the framework of administrative divisions, Grayvoron serves as the administrative center of Grayvoronsky District, to which it is directly subordinated. As a municipal division, the town of Grayvoron, together with the selo of Lugovka in Grayvoronsky District, is incorporated within Grayvoronsky Municipal District as Grayvoron Urban Settlement.

== Demographics ==
Population: 6,179 (2021 census); 6,234 (2010 census); 6,196 (2002 census); 5,992 (1989 Soviet census).

== Notable people ==
- Vladimir Shukhov (1853–1939), engineer
- Anatoliy Boldyrev (1883–1946), scientist
