= Oleksandr Demenko =

Ukrainian soldier and LGBTQ activist

- Олександр Деменко
- Demenko in 2024
- Born: 11 September 1999 (age 27); Zaporizhzhia, Ukraine
- Education: Zaporizhzhia Institute of Economics and Information Technologies
- Military career
- Allegiance: Ukraine
- Unit: 15th Operational Brigade
- Conflicts: Russo-Ukrainian war (2022–present); Siege of Mariupol
- Other work: LGBTQ+ activism in the military

Oleksandr Demenko (Ukrainian: Олександр Деменко, born 11 September 1999) is a Ukrainian soldier who leads the non-governmental organisation Ukrainian LGBT+ Military and Veterans for Equal Rights. He was injured in the siege of Mariupol while defending the Azovstal Iron and Steel Works plant, and was held captive by Russia as a prisoner of war from 17 May 2022 to 31 January 2024, when he was freed in a prisoner exchange.

== Early life ==
Oleksandr Demenko was born in Zaporizhzhia in 1999. He studied at the Zaporizhzhia Institute of Economics and Information Technologies, but joined the military in his second year of studies. He served in the Air Force of Ukraine from 2019 to 2021, and then joined the 9th Operational Regiment of the National Guard of Ukraine, which later became the 15th Operational Brigade.

== Siege of Mariupol ==
Demenko's unit was stationed near Mariupol before the 2022 Russian invasion of Ukraine, and was transferred to the city when the full-scale invasion began. Demenko was one of about 2,500 Ukrainian soldiers who defended the Azovstal Iron and Steel Works plant as it was surrounded by Russian forces during the siege of Mariupol. He was wounded on 30 March 2022.

On 17 May 2022, after the Ukrainian defenders of Azovstal surrendered, Demenko was taken captive by Russian forces. He was held captive in Horlivka before being transferred to Taganrog a week before his release. He and his fellow prisoners of war were deprived of medical care and hygiene, given inadequate food and clothing, and regularly beaten for reasons such as not knowing the Russian anthem or failing to memorise Soviet songs. Upon arrival in Taganrog on 23 January 2024, he and his fellow prisoners were "beaten so badly that [they] couldn't even walk or sit", and other prisoners told him about experiencing electrical torture.

On 31 January 2024, after 20 months of captivity, Demenko was freed in a prisoner exchange and returned to Ukraine.

== LGBTQ activism ==
In August 2025, after receiving five months of treatment, Demenko was elected head of the non-governmental organisation Ukrainian LGBT+ Military Personnel and Veterans for Equal Rights. (Note: Also known as Ukrainian LGBTIQ+ Military Personnel and Veterans for Equal Rights; the organisation uses both names in English.) The NGO's former head Viktor Pylypenko became his deputy. As of 2025, the organisation included more than 500 LGBTQ+ soldiers and veterans. In this position, Demenko plans to advocate for the rights of LGBTQ+ military personnel in Ukraine, as well as support the social reintegration and rehabilitation of LGBTQ+ veterans.

In June 2026, during a cultural event in Kyiv, Demenko asked President Volodymyr Zelenskyy if Ukraine needed cultural products that would "increase public tolerance" and "normalise" LGBTQ+ people and issues in Ukraine; Zelenskyy responded affirmatively.

In July 2026, the NGO launched a new educational course about LGBTQ+ people in the military, featuring Demenko, Pylypenko, and others. The course is available on the Diia.Education platform, and includes topics such as an introduction to sexual orientation and gender identity; common misconceptions; LGBTQ+ rights and their protection; and discrimination in the military. Demenko said the course was intended to give military personnel "the language, facts, and practical guidance for addressing LGBTQ+ issues within military units."

== Personal life ==
Demenko came out as gay to his mother on the phone during the siege of Azovstal, shortly before communications were cut off and Azovstal fell to Russian forces.

In August 2025, Demenko became engaged to his partner Artur. They are waiting for a civil partnership law to be passed in Ukraine. In December 2025, they appeared on Ukraine's edition of Dancing with the Stars in a fundraising episode featuring veterans, becoming the first LGBTQ+ couple to appear on the show.

== See also ==
- Unicorn Battalion (Ukraine)
