= Civic Council (Armed Forces of Ukraine) =

Russian political association

- Гражданский совет
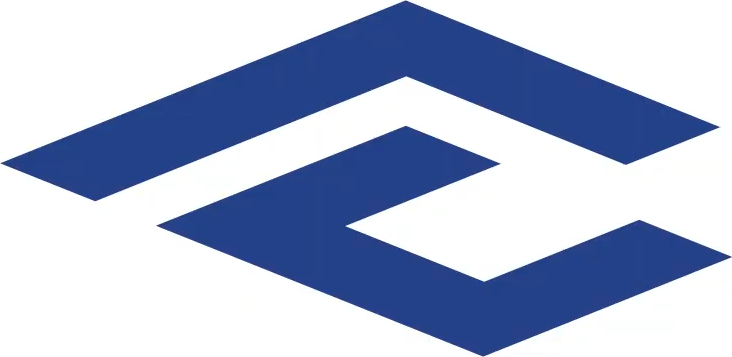
- Formation: 2 November 2022; 3 years ago
- Headquarters: Warsaw, Poland
- International Secretary: Anastasiya Sergeyeva
- Website: https://civiccouncil.info

The Civic Council (Russian: Гражданский совет, romanized: Grazhdansky sovet; Ukrainian: Громадянська рада, romanized: Hromadianska rada) is a political association that announced the recruitment of volunteers into the ranks of national units within the Armed Forces of Ukraine, including the Russian Volunteer Corps (RDK), as well as regional and national organizations of civil resistance in Russia.

== History ==
The Civic Council was established in Warsaw on 2 November 2022 with a public announcement. According to the secretary of the council, Anastasia Sergeyeva, there was a long process when a group of leaders from different regions of Russia was formed. Taking the Kastuś Kalinoŭski Regiment as an example, it was decided to recruit Russians opposed to the government of Russia under Vladimir Putin, both in the ranks of the Armed Forces of Ukraine, and by training professionals for resistance groups inside Russia. Anastasia Sergeeva called the RDK the only unit of Russian citizens in the Armed Forces of Ukraine, in contrast to the Freedom of Russia Legion, which "to this day is shrouded in a veil of mystery", despite statements about its existence. It took several months to agree on the recruitment regulations. A major role was played by Isa Akaiev, who since 2014 led the Krym Battalion.

In November 2023, the Civic Council was designated as "undesirable" in Russia.

== Team ==
- Anastasiya Sergeyeva, international secretary
- Denis Sokolov, Coordinator of the Civic Resistance Center

== Volunteer units ==
Volunteers were trained and joined the ranks of the following units:

- Russian Volunteer Corps
- Sibir Battalion

== See also ==
- Freedom of Russia Legion
