= Artemivsk Police Battalion =

Ukrainian paramilitary force

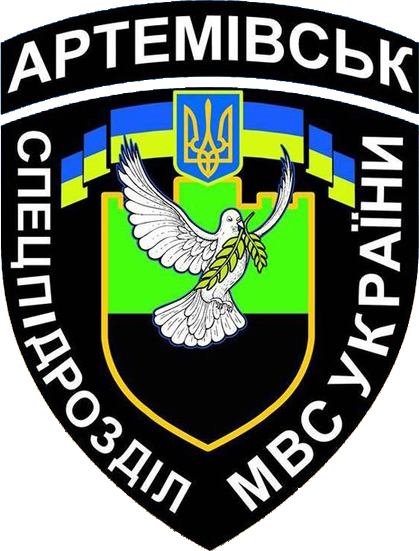
- Active: May 2, 2014 - October 5, 2015
- Country: Ukraine
- Branch: Ministry of Internal Affairs
- Size: 200
- Engagements: War in Donbas: Battle of Krasnyi Lyman

Commanders
- Current commander: Konstantyn Mateichenko

The Artemivsk Police Battalion (Ukr: Батальйон поліції «Артемівськ) was a battalion of the Special Police Forces created in May 2014 in Dnipropetrovsk Oblast and dissolved in October 2015 by the Ministry of Internal Affairs. The battalion fought in the Battle of Krasnyi Lyman and other areas of the War in Donbas.

== Formation ==
The Artemivsk Police Battalion was created on May 2, 2014. According to the Public Relations Department of the Ministry of Internal Affairs in Dnipropetrovsk Oblast, the main task of the battalion was to man checkpoints and provide order in Ukrainian-controlled areas of the ATO zone of Donetsk Oblast. Any resident of Ukraine between the ages of 19 and 45 who had served in the Ukrainian Armed Forces and had no criminal record were eligible to join. Ukrainian Minister of Internal Affairs Arsen Avakov said that by June 2014, the battalion was staffed entirely by people from Donetsk Oblast.

In early May 2014, Konstyantyn Mateichenko was appointed head of the battalion, and later head of Lyman district government following the city's liberation by the battalion.

On October 5, 2015, the Artemivsk Police Battalion and the Tuman Battalion were disbanded. A new rapid response unit was formed from the best fighters from these groups, including those who fought at Debaltseve. The goal of this new rapid response unit was for emergency situations along the frontline.

== Combat History ==
After the liberation of Lyman from Russian-backed separatists in 2014, the battalion began patrolling the streets of the city and carrying out government duties.

On July 1, 2014, the battalion alongside units of the National Guard participated in the liberation of the village of Zakitne from separatists, and began setting up checkpoints between Zakitne and Bakhmut. On the evening of July 4, 2014, the battalion conducted a reconnaissance raid on Bakhmut, destroying the local headquarters of the Donetsk People's Militia. Two days later, the battalion continued setting up checkpoints around Bakhmut.

On July 27, 2014, the battalion liberated the city of Zaitseve, a suburb of Horlivka. Three days later, the battalion liberated the Mykytivka Railroad Station in Horlivka, the Maiorsky checkpoint in the Mykytivka district of Horlivka, and the housing office building on Fadiiva street in Horlivka, where DPR fighters were based. The Ukrainian flag was hung over this area by the battalion.
