= Viktor Pylypenko (soldier) =

Ukrainian soldier and activist (born 1986)

- Віктор Пилипенко
- Born: Viktor Serhiyovych Pylypenko; 6 November 1986 (age 39); Ukraine
- Alma mater: Kyiv Polytechnic Institute
- Military career
- Allegiance: Ukraine
- Branch: Ukrainian Ground Forces
- Service years: 2014–present
- Rank: Junior sergeant
- Nickname: Frenchman
- Unit: 72nd Mechanized Brigade
- Conflicts: War in Donbas; Shyrokyne standoff; Battle of Mariupol; Russo-Ukrainian war (2022–present); Eastern Front
- Awards: ATO Badge
- Other work: LGBTQ+ activism in the military

Viktor Serhiyovych Pylypenko (Note: Ukrainian: Віктор Сергійович Пилипенко) (born 6 November 1986), nicknamed the Frenchman, is a Ukrainian military serviceman, translator, and an advocate for LGBTQ+ service members' rights.

== Early life ==
Pylypenko was born in 1986 into a family with a long military tradition. His great-grandfather and grandfather served in the armed forces. He graduated from a gymnasium in Rivne Oblast and later moved to Kyiv, where he completed a degree in translation studies, specializing in English and French at the Kyiv Polytechnic Institute. After completing his university studies, Pylypenko worked for the Canadian embassy in Kyiv and various human rights organizations. In 2004–2005, he took part in the Orange Revolution.

== Military service ==
=== Russo-Ukrainian war (2014–2022) ===
In 2014, Pylypenko was working and living in the United Arab Emirates. When the Euromaidan protests began, he refused to continue with his contract in Dubai and returned to Ukraine, joining a paramilitary unit of self-defense organized by Maidan protestors. Following the Revolution of Dignity, Pylypenko became a member of the Ukrainian Ground Forces, serving in the front, including in the 2014 Battle of Ilovaisk.

He later served with the Donbas Battalion as a rifleman and a paramedic. Pylypenko continued his service in Luhansk and Donetsk Oblasts until May 2016, taking part in the Shyrokyne standoff and the Battle of Mariupol, for which he was awarded the ATO badge and the presidential recognition for the defense of Ukraine.

In 2018, Pylypenko came out as a gay man. He subsequently engaged in campaigning for LGBTQ+ service members, calling on others to open up and not to hide. Pylypenko also took part in a photographic exhibition about LGBTQ+ Ukrainian military personnel and, in 2019, joined the Kyiv Pride with a column of LGBTQ+ members of the armed forces. That same year, he co-founded an NGO for sexual minorities in the military and took part in the documentary film Let's Be Gay! Dialogues about Dignity, whose premiere on YouTube received support from the Democracy Promotion Foundation of the U.S. embassy in Kyiv. Pylypenko's other activism related to LGBTQ+ issues included events in support of the legalization of civil partnerships and anti-discrimination laws.

=== Russo-Ukrainian war (2022–present) ===
Following the 2022 Russian invasion of Ukraine, Pylypenko returned to military service, again fighting in Luhansk and Donetsk, and in Kharkiv Oblast too. In July 2022, he was promoted to junior sergeant and was awarded with the Medal For Military Service to Ukraine and Medal For Exemplary Military Service in the third degree.

He has been credited with saving several wounded soldiers while serving as a paramedic in the Kharkiv front.

Pylypenko was the head of the non-governmental organisation "Ukrainian LGBT Military Personnel and Veterans for Equal Rights"; he was later succeeded by Oleksandr Demenko.

== Incidents regarding his sexual orientation ==
Pylypenko has been the target of several assaults on account of his sexual orientation.

In a 2019 march to honor fallen service members during the war, he was assaulted by a veteran and Orthodox priest. The beating was condemned by the United Nations Human Rights Office. Pylypenko suffered another physical aggression during a TV debate in June 2020, when far-right activist Dmytro Korchynsky violently shouted at him, labelling his homosexuality as "non-traditional" before splashing a glass of water in his face.

In 2021, Pylypenko was the subject of a smear campaign by right-wing groups in Ukraine, who accused him of working with Russians. Conversely, in Russian media, Pylypenko was said to be forming an "LGBTQ+ military unit" within the Ukrainian Armed Forces.

In August of that year, an unknown person entered a chat room for Ukrainian gay soldiers and stole videos of explicit sexual content between Pylypenko and another openly gay soldier, Serhiy Afanasyev. The user subsequently posted the videos on Telegram, which resulted in a harassment campaign against Pylypenko and Afanasyev. Both men condemned the leak of the video as a form of revenge porn and said that it was part of their private life that did not harm anyone. They also advocated for the decriminalization of pornographic material within the military, arguing that it helps, while not causing harm to anyone in the ranks.

When singers Serhiy Zhadan and Khrystyna Soloviy released a video in October 2023 featuring women kissing in front of a church in Lviv, the Ukrainian Greek Catholic Church removed the church's rector. In response to that decision, Pylypenko organized a massive gay kissing event in front of the church to show solidarity with the rector.

In February 2024, Patriarch Filaret Denysenko awarded several units, including Pylypenko's, with the medal for the "Sacrifice and Love for Ukraine", but cancelled the specific one for Pylypenko upon learning that he is a gay man. The church released a statement saying that they thanked Pylypenko's military merits, but that the church did not share his "sinful preferences and LGBT agitation." In an act of solidarity, the rest of the recipients turned down the Patriarch's recognition.

In June 2025, Pylypenko faced off with counterprotesters at the Kyiv Pride. He took part in the march to draw attention to the growing losses on the front lines and fallen servicemen whose families remain unrecognized by law.

In August 2025, during the funeral of David Chichkan, Pylypenko was physically assaulted by Denis Kapustin, a neo-Nazi and notorious homophobe who serves as the commander of the Russian Volunteer Corps. Kapustin took offense at Pylypenko displaying a rainbow flag at the ceremony.

== Personal life ==
Pylypenko said that he wished to have come out earlier, adding that he envies teenagers who realize they are gay at a young age because he had struggled with internalized homophobia. In an interview for QUA – LGBTQ Ukrainians in America, which helps Ukrainian refugees and expatriates in the United States, Pylypenko said that he hoped to see the things that he saw in the U.S. happen in Ukraine, referring to LGBTQ+ events he saw while visiting a gay friend in Chicago.

In August 2018, Pylypenko gave an interview to Ukrainian lifestyle magazine Life Pravda, a subsidiary of media outlet Ukrainska Pravda. In the interview, Pylypenko said that in his childhood and adolescence, he grew isolated while attending high school in Kyiv due to refusing to speak Russian, alleging that he sees Russian as a language associated with colonialism and colonial thinking, referencing Ukrainophile Ahatanhel Krymsky as a national role model.

He also stated that while living in the UAE, he was engaged in a long-term relationship with an Emirati gay man, adding that being gay in the UAE is illegal under Sharia, but that if the parties involved keep it private, they do not usually face legal consequences.

Regarding the then-ongoing war, Pylypenko said that he did not want to return to war unless there was an invasion (which happened in 2022), recalling the bad side of serving with some "bad sheep" like bandits and deserters. When asked about his homosexuality at the beginning of his military career, Pylypenko said that he kept it a secret, even pretending to go to brothels and have sex with a prostitute to conceal his homosexuality from his comrades, saying that his best friend suspected so much that he (Pylypenko) was gay that he kept asking him if he had ever had a girlfriend.

Pylypenko spoke about his coming out to family members, saying that his sister and her husband knew for a long time that he was gay, and that they had always supported him. Regarding his parents, Pylypenko said in August 2018 that his mother had "recently" written to him accepting that he is gay, while he added that he had not spoken with his father about the issue. In the same interview, Pylypenko stated that there are many gay Russian servicemen, positively comparing Ukraine and its wider acceptance, according to Pylypenko, of same-sex relationships than in Russia.

In July 2024, he said that he never hid his sexual orientation from his comrades, recounting that he used a mobile phone with a rainbow sticker on it. When the other soldiers began asking him whether he was gay, Pylypenko responded positively, and reported in an interview with military newspaper Frontliner Ukraine that he did not face any significant incident of homophobia with his colleagues.
