= Russian Volunteer Corps =

Pro-Ukraine paramilitary unit of Russians

- Русский добровольческий корпус
- Leader: Denis Kapustin
- Dates active: 22 August 2022 – present
- Allegiance: Ukraine: International Legion of the Defence Intelligence of Ukraine
- Ideology: Anti-Putinism
- Political position: Right-wing to far-right
- Website: rusvolcorps.com

The Russian Volunteer Corps (RVC; Russian: Русский добровольческий корпус, РДК, romanized: Russkiy dobrovolcheskiy korpus, RDK) is a paramilitary unit of International Legion of the Defence Intelligence of Ukraine, a subordinate to the Main Directorate of Intelligence. The force is composed of citizens of Russia, based in Ukraine and united by their opposition to Russian President Vladimir Putin. It was formed in August 2022 after the 2022 Russian invasion of Ukraine to fight against the Russian government under Putin.

The group claimed responsibility for a March 2023 raid into the Bryansk Oblast of Russia. Since May 2023, it has been launching larger cross-border raids into the Belgorod Oblast of Russia, alongside the Freedom of Russia Legion.

== Origin and aims ==
The Russian Volunteer Corps (RVC) was founded by Ukrainian intelligence in August 2022 According to the Ukrainian news agency Glavcom, the RVC was formed by Russian volunteers who had started fighting for Ukraine in the Azov Regiment and other units in 2014. According to Polish news agency Vot Tak, unlike the Freedom of Russia Legion, the leadership of the RVC does not rely on Russian POWs-turned-defectors, but on Russian right-wing emigrants living in Ukraine.

The RVC says it is made up of ethnic Russians fighting to defend Ukraine against Russia's invasion and to overthrow the government of Vladimir Putin. It asserts Russia's government should abandon its imperial ambitions and instead focus on improving the well-being of ethnic Russians. The RVC say they believe in self-determination for Russia's various ethnic minorities and "want to see a smaller, ethnic Russian state". The Jamestown Foundation said in May 2025 that members were fighting for Cossack freedom, political autonomy, and resistance against Russia's imperial system.

RVC uses the symbols of the anti-Bolshevik Russian Liberation Army, largely composed of Soviet prisoners of war in German captivity who collaborated with Nazi Germany during World War II, but also helped Czech partisans in the Prague uprising against the German occupation.

== Ideology ==
Assessments of the ideology of this unit members, including the commander of the detachment, Denis Kapustin, vary from far-right and white nationalist to neo-Nazi. The RVC stated that they maintain right-wing conservative views and reject extremist labels.

In May 2023 RVC posted their official manifesto called "Homo ethnicus". According to the manifesto, RVC fights for a "Russian nation-state" where the land will "belong to those born on it," and "only blood, abilities, and personal achievements" will matter. One of the members told DW that their goal is a "true nation-state of Russians in the original Russian territories — taking into account the territorial integrity of Ukraine and Belarus, as well as neighboring countries. We want to establish a state for Russians that lives in peace with all the nations that surround it."

German authorities have cautioned that the RVC fighting for Ukraine serves as a strategic advantage for Russian propagandists, enabling them to portray the Russian invasion in Ukraine as a purported effort to "de-Nazify" the nation. "De-Nazification" is a common talking point in Russian disinformation to justify the invasion of Ukraine.

== Organization ==
The group gathers its forces through recruiting anti-Putin activists with civilian backgrounds and then coordinates with various political factions that move individuals across borders. Those associated with the RVC come from differing ideological backgrounds. They frequently share nothing other than a mutual opposition to the invasion of Ukraine coupled with the aim of ending the current Russian government.

According to Kapustin, as of August 2022, the RDK "interacted" with the Ukrainian Armed Forces but was not recognized as a unit of the Ukrainian army. He stated: "We had to go all the way to the President of Ukraine to make our case and ask for permission to officially fight. The president gave the green light, and in one day, everything began to move."

Reuters has recounted assertions that "RVC fighters [have] received regular salaries from the Ukrainian defence ministry" as well as that the overall "unit [has] numbered up to 200 fighters". However, the news agency has cautioned that these statements have not been independently verified.

The RVC maintains a "Free-Cossack Detachment" consisting of Cossack volunteers primarily from the Kuban region of southern Russia with the unit reportedly taking part in the fighting in Avdiivka and Svatove.

In 2023, the RVC expanded recruitment to prisoners of war from Z-Storm units, as well as ex-Wagner Group fighters who served in Africa. In an interview Kapustin explained that these fighters return from Africa to Russia to sell their property, and then they head off to fight for Ukraine.

Before beginning cooperation with the Civic Council, the unit only accepted Russians who were already abroad. With the cooperation the Civic Center functions as a ″kind of recruitment center″ and according to Anastasia Sergeyeva, the public face of the Civic Council, men were also then accepted directly from Russia. In order to join, volunteers fill out an online questionnaire or write to an encrypted mailbox.

The Karelian Group, a battalion made up of separatists from Northwestern Russia of Finno-Ugric origin, became a part of the RVC in late 2023.

Insignia of the RVC's Cossack Unit

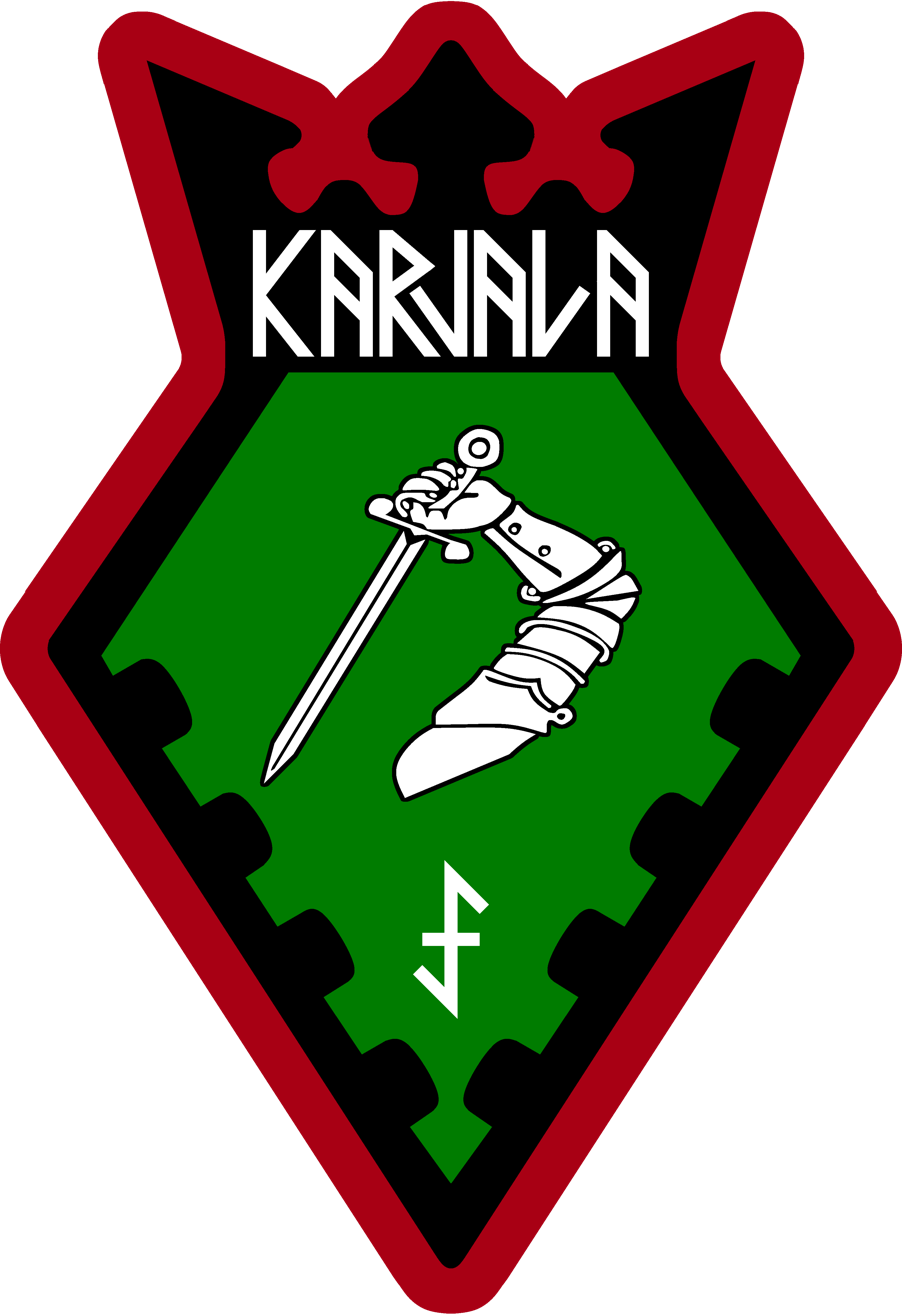
Insignia of the Karelian Group

== Affiliations ==
RVC is a part of International Legion of the Defence Intelligence of Ukraine and is subordinate to the Main Directorate of Intelligence.

The Russian Volunteer Corp is part of the Civic Council, a Russian emigrant association that was founded in Warsaw.

According to Ilya Ponomarev, the RVC took part in a press conference on 31 August 2022 with the Freedom of Russia Legion and the National Republican Army when they signed a joint declaration. He claimed that the RVC also agreed to join the agreement.

== Members ==
Members of the group include former FSB agent Ilya Bogdanov and founder of black metal music groups Wotan Jugend and M8L8TH frontman Alexey Levkin.

== Military operations ==
=== Bryansk Oblast raid ===
On 2 March 2023, the Russian authorities claimed that an armed Ukrainian group crossed the border and carried out a "terrorist attack" in the villages of Lyubechane and Sushany, in Bryansk Oblast. Russia said the attackers fired on a car, killing two civilians, before the Federal Security Service forced them back into Ukraine. On 9 March, Russia launched a barrage of missile strikes at Ukrainian civilian infrastructure in what it called "retaliation" for the attack. The Russian Volunteer Corps claimed responsibility for the alleged cross-border raid, and posted videos of armed men in Lyubechane with their insignia, urging Russians to "rise up and fight" against the government.

Ukrainian officials initially denied involvement, saying it was either a Russian false flag attack or a case of Russians rebelling against their government.

On 6 April 2023, the Russian Volunteer Corps again claimed to have crossed the border into Bryansk Oblast, entering the village of Sluchovsk. While Russian authorities claimed that an attempted incursion was prevented, the Russian Volunteer Corps released video showing them inside the village. During the incursion, combat operations were allegedly carried out.

=== Belgorod Oblast raids ===
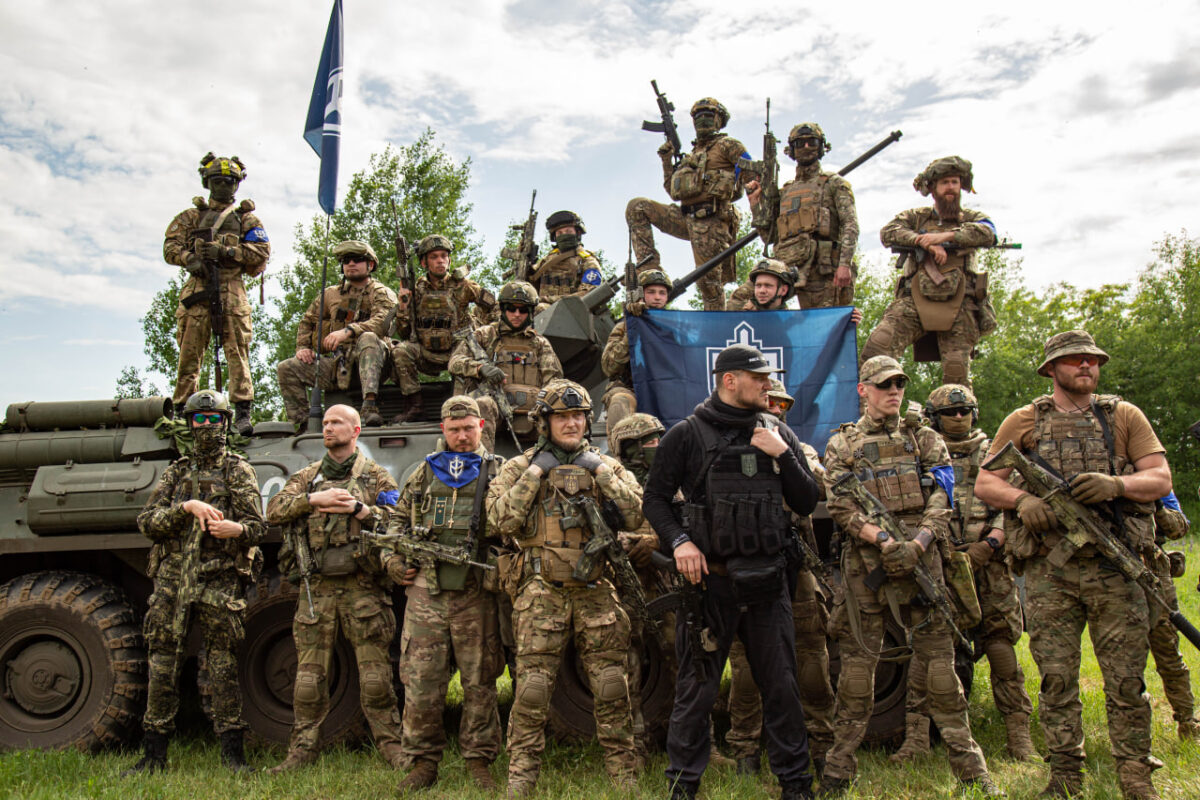
Members of the Russian Volunteer Corps on 24 May 2023. Denis 'White Rex' is in the middle foreground.

On 22 May 2023, the RVC and the Freedom of Russia Legion launched a larger raid into Russia, this time in Grayvoronsky District, Belgorod Oblast; videos that circulated online showed armed men who said they belonged to the RVC saying they had crossed the border to fight "the bloody Putinite and Kremlin regime". The governor of Belgorod Oblast said that a Ukrainian "sabotage group" had entered the region and that a "counterterrorism regime" was introduced. The paramilitaries reportedly captured several border villages. On 24 May, the RVC held a press conference on the Ukrainian side of the border. Denis 'White Rex' said they were satisfied with the raid, saying they had seized weapons, an armoured personnel carrier, and taken prisoners before leaving Russian territory after 24 hours. He said that two RVC fighters were wounded and that Ukraine provided support only with medical supplies, fuel and food. Separately, the Freedom of Russia Legion said two of its fighters had been killed and 10 wounded.

== Incidents ==
In September 2026, a shootout occurred in Kyiv between the Security Service of Ukraine (SBU) and the Defence Intelligence of Ukraine (HUR), which the RVC is subordinate to, over the SBU's detention of RVC deputy commander Stepan Kaplunov. The SBU accused Kaplunov of contacts with Russia's Federal Security Service (FSB) and said he had been tasked with assassinating a Russian opposition figure travelling to Ukraine. Kaplunov denied this and said that he had confessed under duress after being detained by the SBU since 23 August. The shootout occurred when SBU officers brought Kaplunov back to his apartment for a search, where HUR officers were waiting.

== See also ==
- Civic Council (Armed Forces of Ukraine)
- Freedom of Russia Legion
- Combat Organization of Anarcho-Communists
- Azov Brigade
