= Battle of Lyman =

Battle of Lyman may refer to:

- Battle of Lyman's Wagon Train, 1874
- Battle of Krasnyi Lyman, in Donetsk Oblast, Ukraine, in 2014
- Russian capture of Lyman, Ukraine, during the Battle of Donbas in May 2022
- Battle of Lyman (September–October 2022), recapture by Ukraine
