= Sexual orientation and military service by country =

This overview shows the regulations regarding military service of non-heterosexuals around the world.

== Countries that allow openly gay, lesbian and bisexual people to serve ==
Conceptions and categories of sexual orientation are not universal. Language contained in the following entries, as much as possible, reflects local usage or official doctrine.

=== Albania ===
Gays and lesbians have been allowed to serve in the Military of Albania since 2008.

=== Argentina ===
As of 2009, the Argentine government has officially ended the ban on homosexuals in the Argentine Armed Forces. A new military justice system was put into effect which decriminalizes homosexuality among uniformed members, and moves crimes committed exclusively within the military to the public justice sphere [previously there had been a separate military court system].

Under the old system, homosexuals were not permitted to have access to a military career, at the same time as this sexual orientation was penalized. And, while there are no publicly known former sanctions against homosexuals under the old policy, this does not mean that men and women with that sexual orientation have not been disciplined, and perhaps separated from the armed forces under a mantle of silence. In fact, with this new system, homosexuals who wish to train in the forces should encounter no impediment, nor any military retaliation.

=== Australia ===
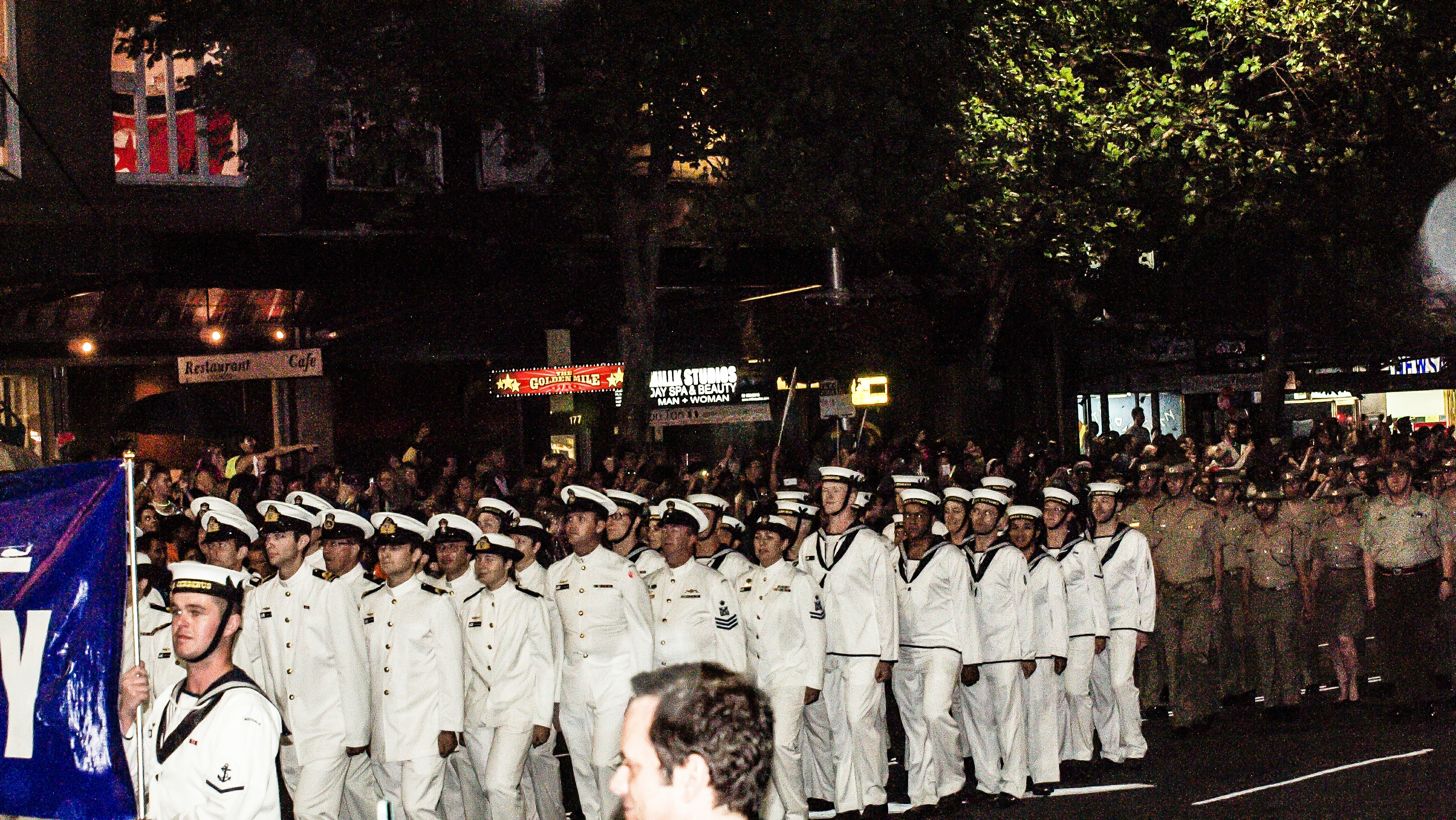
Uniformed Australian Defence Force personnel marching in the 2013 Sydney Mardi Gras

Australia has allowed homosexuals to serve openly since 1992.

=== Austria ===
Austria permits homosexuals to serve openly in the Austrian Armed Forces.

=== Bahamas ===
The Royal Bahamas Defence Force does not discriminate on the basis of sexual orientation. The government made the announcement in 1998.

=== Belgium ===
Belgium permits homosexuals to serve openly in the Belgian Armed Forces. In Belgium, the military accepts gay men and lesbians into service. However, if the behaviour of an individual who is gay or lesbian causes problems, that individual is subject to discipline or discharge. In some cases, homosexual personnel have been transferred from their unit if they have been too open with their sexuality. The Belgian military also continues to reserve the right to deny gay and lesbian personnel high-level security clearances, for fear they may be susceptible to blackmail.

=== Bermuda ===
The Military of Bermuda does not discriminate on grounds of sexual orientation. Officially, members of the Bermuda Regiment are prohibited from discriminating against or harassing soldiers on the basis of sexual orientation; such activities, however, are tolerated by officers, to the extent that one conscript described the Regiment as "the most homophobic environment that exists".

=== Bolivia ===
The Armed Forces of Bolivia announced in 2013 that LGBT citizens would be allowed to serve beginning in 2015.

=== Brazil ===
There is no law forbidding lesbians, gays, bisexuals and transgender people from serving in the Brazilian Armed Forces. Sexual orientation and gender identity cannot be an obstacle for entry into the police force or the military in Brazil, and some trans women and travestis should make conscription, like some Brazilian male citizens. All sexual acts are disallowed between members of the forces, be they heterosexual or homosexual.

The Constitution of Brazil prohibits any form of discrimination in the country. The Brazilian Armed Forces does not permit desertion, sexual acts or congeners in the military, whether heterosexual or homosexual. They claim that it is not a homophobic rule, but a rule of discipline that also includes the opposite sex.

In 2008, during the disappearance of a military gay couple, the Ministry of Defence of Brazil spoke: "the sergeant is to be questioned about alleged desertion from the military and there is no question of discrimination." The two soldiers said they had been in a stable relationship for ten years in the Brazilian military.

No information currently exists as to whether military personnel can have their same-sex relationships recognized by the military, despite the fact that federal government employees can receive benefits for their same-sex spouses. Following the Supreme Federal Tribunal decision in favor of civil unions, Defense Minister Nelson Jobim guaranteed the Ministry's compliance with the decision and mentioned that spousal benefits can be accorded to same-sex spouses of military personnel.

According to a survey conducted by the Institute of Applied Economic Research (IPEA) in 2012, 53.7% of Brazilians support the entry of LGBTs in the Brazilian Armed Forces, and do not see it as a problem.

=== Bulgaria ===
Bulgaria's Protection Against Discrimination Act of 2003 protects individuals from discrimination on the grounds of sexual orientation in relation to recruitment to the military.

=== Canada ===
As of 1992, lesbians, gays and bisexuals are allowed to serve openly in the military. A study of gays and lesbians in the Canadian military has found that after Canada's 1992 decision to allow homosexuals to serve openly in its armed forces, military performance did not decline.

The study is the most comprehensive academic study by US researchers of homosexuality in a foreign military ever compiled and reflects an exhaustive inventory of relevant data and research. Its title is "Effects of the 1992 Lifting of Restrictions on Gay and Lesbian Service in the Canadian Forces; Appraising the Evidence".

- Lifting of restrictions on gay and lesbian service in the Canadian Forces has not led to any change in military performance, unit cohesion, or discipline.
- Self-identified gay, lesbian, and transsexual members of the Canadian Forces contacted for the study describe good working relationships with peers.
- The number of military women who experienced sexual harassment dropped 46% after the ban was lifted. While there were several reasons why harassment declined, one factor was that after the ban was lifted women were free to report assaults without fear that they would be accused of being a lesbian.
- Before Canada lifted its gay ban, a 1985 survey of 6,500 male soldiers found that 62% said that they would refuse to share showers, undress or sleep in the same room as a gay soldier. After the ban was lifted, follow-up studies found no increase in disciplinary, performance, recruitment, sexual misconduct, or resignation problems.
- None of the 905 assault cases in the Canadian Forces from November, 1992 (when the ban was lifted) until August, 1995 involved gay bashing or could be attributed to the sexual orientation of one of the parties.

A news article by Canadian journalist, Jon Tattrie, reported on the changed attitude towards the presence of homosexual members of the Canadian Forces in his article "Being Gay in the Military" (Metro Ottawa), quoting Canadian Forces spokesperson Rana Sioufi as saying: "Members who are same-sex partners are entitled to the same respect and dignity as heterosexual married couples or common-law partners."

In the past 20 years, the Canadian Forces has gone from being a homophobic organization that actively hounded out gay and lesbian members to one of the world's leading advocates of open integration.

— Jon Tattrie, "Being Gay in the Military", Metro Ottawa, August 20, 2010

=== Chile ===
The Military of Chile does not discriminate on grounds of sexual orientation. Chile bans all anti-gay discrimination since 2012.

On August 13, 2014, The Defense Ministry ordered the creation of a new committee to monitor inclusion and tackle discrimination in the armed forces, a move hailed as a "historic" step by gay rights campaigners. Marcos Robledo, defense undersecretary, announced the formation of a Diversity and Anti-Discrimination Committee with the aim to eradicate arbitrary discrimination in the military. The resolution, signed by Defense Minister Jorge Burgos, established the government as responsible for creating a more inclusive armed services.

Few days later, a sailor in Chile became the first serving member of the Chilean armed forces to announce he is gay. Mauricio Ruiz, 24, told a televised news conference his decision had "not been easy", but he wanted to help fight discrimination against homosexuals. Mr Ruiz said that what was most important was not a soldier's sexual orientation, but his or her willingness to serve the country. His announcement came with the full backing of the Chilean armed. Mauricio Ruiz said homosexuals had "no reason to hide". "We can do anything, be marines or in any branch (of the military). We can do whatever profession, and we deserve as much respect as anyone else," he told reporters in the Chilean capital, Santiago. "In life there's nothing better than to be yourself, to be authentic, to look at people in the eye and for those people to know who you are."

Rolando Jimenez, president of Chile's Movement for Integration and Homosexual Liberation, expressed his gratitude to the Chilean Navy. "(The Navy is) telling the country and the members of the institution particularly that it is possible for gays and lesbians to be part of the armed forces and that they aren't going to suffer discrimination because of their sexual orientation within these institutions," Mr Jimenez said.

=== Colombia ===
In 1999 the Colombian Constitutional Court ruled that the prohibition of homosexuals from serving in the armed forces is unconstitutional and members of the LGBT community may serve openly.

=== Croatia ===
LGBT persons are not banned from participation in military service. Ministry of Defence has no internal rules regarding LGBT persons, but it follows regulation at the state level which explicitly prohibits discrimination on the basis of sexual orientation. Some media reports have suggested that most gay men serving in the military generally decide to keep their sexual orientation private, but there have also been reports suggesting that the Croatian Armed Forces take discrimination very seriously and will not tolerate homophobia among its personnel.

=== Cyprus ===
Homosexuals used to be banned from serving in the Cypriot Military. However, the 2011 National Guard Law does not include a ban.

=== Czech Republic ===
Since 1999, Czech law has prohibited discrimination based on sexual orientation in the military.

In 2004, the Army of the Czech Republic refused to enter the service of a trans woman, Jaroslava Brokešová, who had previously undergone an official transition, according to assessing doctors. A military spokesperson said that the reason was not her transgender identity. Another trans recruit was rejected in 2014 due to alleged "reduction in the morale of combat units". By 2015, the trans identity of candidates and service candidates was no longer considered relevant to military service.

=== Denmark ===
Denmark allows homosexuals to serve openly. There are prominent openly gay military leaders in the Danish Armed Forces and there are no reported cases of threats to gays, morale, or national security. A study of the conditions for gay men indicates that gay men in the Danish Armed Forces show strength and are respected.

=== East Germany ===
In 1988 East Germany ended a ban on openly gay people serving in the National People’s Army, one of the first countries to do so.

=== Ecuador ===
Prior to the decriminalization of homosexuality in Ecuador in 1997, LGBT people couldn't openly serve in the military, as article 87 of the Ley de Personal de Fuerzas Armadas stipulated that any conscript that violated a law had to be separated from the military. One year after the decriminalization of homosexuality, Ecuador's army released a military discipline regulation that included the practice of same-sex sexual acts among the reasons for discharge. This article was removed in 2009, which finally allowed LGBT to openly serve in the army. However, there was a case of a soldier discharged in 2014 who denounced that the act was motivated by the fact that he was gay. His officials, on the other hand, insisted that his sexual orientation, which was publicly known since 2010, had nothing to do with his discharge.

=== Estonia ===
Estonia allows homosexuals to serve openly in the Military of Estonia.

=== Finland ===
Finland allows homosexuals to serve openly in the Finnish Defence Forces.

=== France ===
France allows homosexuals to serve openly. Although homosexuals are not banned, they may face greater challenges than their heterosexual counterparts. Commanders and psychiatrists who believe gay and lesbian personnel are disrupting their units can discharge them.

=== Germany ===
The German Bundeswehr ruled that it is forbidden to discriminate based on sexual orientation. The "Working Committee of Homosexual Employees in the Military Forces" is the organization that represents the interests of gay men and lesbians in the armed forces. Heterosexuals and homosexuals alike are allowed to engage in sexual activity while in the military service as long as it does not interfere with the performance of their duties. Lesbian and gay soldiers are also entitled to enter civil unions as defined by Germany's domestic "partnership" law.

The Bundeswehr maintained a "glass ceiling" policy that effectively banned homosexuals from becoming officers until 2000. First Lieutenant Winfried Stecher, an army officer demoted for his homosexuality, filed a lawsuit against former Defense Minister Rudolf Scharping. Scharping vowed to fight the claim in court, claiming that homosexuality "raises serious doubts about suitability and excludes employment in all functions pertaining to leadership." However, before the case went to trial, the Defense Ministry reversed the discriminatory policy. While the German government declined to issue an official explanation for the reversal, it is widely believed that Scharping was overruled by then Chancellor Gerhard Schröder and then Vice-Chancellor Joschka Fischer.

Currently, according to general military orders given in the year 2000, tolerance towards all sexual orientations is considered to be part of the duty of military personnel. Sexual relationships and acts amongst soldiers outside service times, regardless of the sexual orientation, are defined to be "irrelevant", regardless of the rank and function of the soldier(s) involved, while harassment or the abuse of functions is considered a transgression, as well as the performance of sexual acts in active service.

=== Greece ===
While the Presidential Decree 133 (of 2002) allowed people to avoid the draft for deep psycho-sexual problems, it did not ban homosexuals from the army. The newer 2005 law 3421 has removed even the wording that could be misconstrued as offensive to homosexuals. In recent years, the Greek army has been shortening the length of conscription and hiring more and more professional soldiers and there hasn't been any incident of someone being fired for homosexuality.

=== Ireland ===
Lesbian, gay and bisexual people can serve openly in the Irish Defence Forces. Discrimination on the basis of sexual orientation is illegal.

There has been no preclusion since 1993 when male homosexuality was decriminalised in the Republic of Ireland. Since 1993, there has been significant change to make sure that there was no discrimination in terms of public policy. At the same time as an equal age of consent was introduced for heterosexual and homosexual persons, the Irish Defence Forces announced that they would be treating heterosexual and homosexual members equally. Relationships between senior and junior ranks would continue to be forbidden, as is common in most militaries. There would also be no harassment of gay officers and no questioning of members about their sexuality. The Irish Independent wrote in 1993 that:

In a related development, the Chief of Staff of the Irish Defence Forces, Lieutenant General Noel Bergin, told the Irish Independent on Tuesday that a report on the introduction of a code of conduct governing interpersonal relationships is being prepared. The decision to prepare a report follows a recent announcement by the Minister for Defence, David Andrews, that military regulations would be modified to take account of any reform in the civil law on homosexuality. Andrews is seen as a member of the liberal wing of the Fianna Fáil party. Lt. Gen Bergin pointed out that the Army does not ask potential recruits about their sexual orientation, and that they had few problems in the past in this area.

Information regarding sexual orientation is not sought from personnel wishing to enlist in the Defence Forces. The Defence Forces have a code on interpersonal relationships and guidelines in relation to discrimination.

=== Israel ===
A policy in 1983 allowed prospective Israeli soldiers to be questioned about their sexual orientation. Scholars Ben-Ari and Kaplan suggested that the prospective soldiers' responses affected what military unit they would be assigned to. However, the 1993 policy was put into effect to remove the 1983 policy. Israel Defense Forces policies allow gay men and lesbians to serve openly and without discrimination or harassment due to actual or perceived sexual orientation. This was put into effect in 1993 after an IDF reserves officer testified before the Knesset claiming that his rank had been revoked, and that he had been barred from researching sensitive topics in military intelligence, solely because of his sexual identity.

Homosexuals serve openly in the military, including special units, without any discrimination. Moreover, homosexuals in the IDF have additional rights, such as the right to take a shower alone if they want to. According to a University of California, Santa Barbara study, a brigadier general stated that Israelis show a "great tolerance" for gay soldiers. Consul David Saranga at the Israeli Consulate in New York, who was interviewed by the St. Petersburg Times, said, "It's a non-issue. You can be a very good officer, a creative one, a brave one, and be gay at the same time."

In a comprehensive review of interviews with all known experts on homosexuality in the IDF in 2004, researchers were not able to find any data suggesting that Israel's decision to lift its gay ban undermined operational effectiveness, combat readiness, unit cohesion or morale. In this security-conscious country where the military is considered to be essential to the continued existence of the nation, the decision to include sexual minorities has not harmed IDF effectiveness.

While no official statistics are available for harassment rates of sexual minorities in the IDF, scholars, military officials and representatives of gay organizations alike assert that vicious harassment is rare. A study published by the Israel Gay Youth Movement in January 2012 found that half of the homosexual soldiers who serve in the IDF suffer from violence and homophobia.

Even though the law states that gay soldiers cannot be discriminated against by the Israeli military, does not mean it does not occur between soldiers. Ben-Ari and Kaplan, the scholars who wrote “Sexual Orientation and Military Service”, discovered that gay Israeli soldiers faced discrimination from their fellow military men because they were viewed as mentally ill, lonely, and insecure. Ben- Ari and Kaplan cited a study about how an Israeli soldier's sexual partner preference influenced the way they were treated. The study conveyed that soldiers bonded in the Israeli military through homophobic remarks and sexualizing women. There was another study that scholars Ben-Ari and Kaplan created that determined how gay Israeli soldiers responded to the macho man stereotype in the military. Gay soldiers either isolated themselves from the rest of the soldiers or attempted to adapt to heterosexual norms. In the end, gay soldiers' military performance was not affected by their response but their integration into the military was affected.

=== Italy ===
Until 1986, "sexual deviance" was a reason for exclusion for military service. At that time, some men claimed to be homosexual to avoid the draft. Lesbians have never been banned from the Italian military since women were first allowed to serve in 2000. Since 2010, discrimination against gays and lesbians in military service is banned, but the situation for transgender people is unclear. The organization Polis Aperta estimates that 5 to 10% of Italians in uniformed service (military or police) are LGBT. Despite the ban on discrimination, some service personnel face harassment or violence because of their sexual orientation.

=== Japan ===
Japan does not have any rules applying to homosexuals serving in the Self-Defense Forces. The Japan Self-Defense Forces, when being asked about their policy toward gays and lesbians following the U.S. debate during the Bill Clinton presidency, answered that it was not an issue, and individuals within the forces indicated that as long as same-sex relations did not lead to fights or other trouble, there were few, if any, barriers to their inclusion in the armed services.

=== Latvia ===
Latvia allows homosexuals to serve openly.

=== Lithuania ===
Lesbian, gay, and bisexual people are allowed to serve openly in the Lithuanian Armed Forces. As of 2020, the official medical fitness criteria for military, riflemen's combat unit, or intelligence service do not list gender identity or gender transition as disqualifying conditions: the suitability for service is assessed individually based on physical and mental health status by the Military Medical Expertise Commission. In 2015, the Ministry of Defence reaffirmed that the sexual orientation cannot be an obstacle to serve in the military.

=== Luxembourg ===
Luxembourg allows homosexuals to serve openly.

=== Malta ===
Malta allows people to serve openly in the armed forces regardless of their sexual orientation or gender identity. According to the military, a number of openly gay people serve, and the official attitude is one of "live and let live", where "a person's postings and duties depend on their qualifications, not their sexual orientation".

=== Mexico ===
The Mexican Armed Forces' policy on sexual orientation is ambiguous, leaving homosexual and bisexual soldiers in a "legal limbo". Officially, there is no law or policy preventing homosexuals from serving, and applicants are not questioned on the subject. In practice, however, outed homosexual and bisexual soldiers are subject to severe harassment and are often discharged. One directive, issued in 2003, described actions "contrary to morality or good manners on- and off-duty" (Spanish: en contra de la moral o de las buenas costumbres dentro y fuera del servicio [sic]) as serious misconduct warranting disciplinary action. Other references to morality are found throughout military documents, leaving room for interpretation with regards to sexual orientation. Although there is no clear position from current military leadership, several retired generals have agreed that homosexual soldiers were usually removed from service either through an encouraged withdrawal or dishonorable discharge. By 2018, homosexuals were allowed to serve openly in the military. People whose homosexuality is discovered face harassment from other soldiers.

In 2007, the Supreme Court of Justice of the Nation ruled that it is unconstitutional to discharge soldiers for being HIV-positive. Previously, a 2003 law required that HIV-soldiers be discharged from service.

=== Netherlands ===
In 1974, the Netherlands was the first country to ban discrimination against gays in the military. The Dutch government considered homosexuality grounds for dismissal until 1974, when the Association of Dutch Homosexuals convinced the Minister of Defense that gays posed no threat to national security. The Dutch military formed a working group called Homosexuality and Armed Forces to improve the climate for sexual minorities. In the 1980s, this group became the Homosexuality and Armed Forces Foundation, a trade union that continues to represent gay and lesbian personnel to the Ministry of Defense.

=== New Zealand ===
In New Zealand it has been legal for gay, lesbian, bisexual and transgender persons to serve in the military since New Zealand's Human Rights Act 1993 ended most forms of employment discrimination against lesbians, gay men and bisexuals. New Zealand military leaders did not oppose the end of military service discrimination. The Royal New Zealand Navy and the New Zealand Police are amongst many government agencies to have adopted "gay-friendly" policies.

=== Norway ===
Norway allows homosexuals to serve openly in the armed forces. Norway, like most of Scandinavia, is very liberal in regards to LGBT-rights and it also became the first country in the world to enact an anti-discrimination law protecting homosexuals in certain areas.

The Norwegian government states: Anyone who in written or verbal form is threatening, scorning, persecuting, or spiteful toward a gay or lesbian person will be punished with fines or prison of up to two years.

=== Peru ===
According to Section 269 of the Military Penal Code of 1988, military and police personnel who engaged in same-sex sexual activity, could be punished with between 60 days to 20 years imprisonment or discharge from the forces. Although being homosexual was not explicitly forbidden, recruiters would routinely reject applicants whom they suspected of being homosexual. On 9 June 2004, the Constitutional Court of Peru ruled that it was a form of unconstitutional discrimination to discharge people who committed homosexual acts from the military, given that equivalent heterosexual acts were allowed.

=== Philippines ===
The Philippine government has officially ended, as of 2010, the ban on gays in the military. In July 2012, the Philippine Military Academy announced that it has welcomed openly gay and lesbian applicants into its fold, giving them the opportunity to serve in the military although public display of affection and crossdressing is not permissible.

=== Poland ===
Since the 1990s, lesbian, gay and bisexual people are not banned from military service and discrimination against them is officially forbidden. However, there is an unwritten rule of "don't ask, don't tell" and most gay Polish soldiers conceal their sexual orientation. In 2013, military personnel told NaTemat.pl portal that openly gay personnel would face social difficulty, especially for higher ranks, as for "commanding staff—officers and high-ranking NCOs—admitting to same-sex attraction would mean losing respect—qualities without which you simply cannot be a commander".

Openly transgender people are officially barred from military service on the medical grounds. Diagnosis of gender dysphoria results in being automatically assigned as "permanently and completely unfit for military service, both in the time of conflict and peace".

=== Portugal ===
Portugal allows all citizens to serve openly in the military regardless of sexual orientation, as the constitution explicitly forbids any discrimination on that basis, therefore openly allowing lesbians and gays to serve in the military.

In April 2016, Portugal's armed forces chief General Carlos Jerónimo resigned, days after being summoned to explain comments about gay soldiers made by the deputy head of the military college. President Marcelo Rebelo de Sousa accepted the resignation of Jerónimo, who took up the post of chief of staff in 2014. The resignation came after António Grilo, deputy head of the military college, admitted advising parents of young military students in the Portuguese army to withdraw their sons if they were gay "to protect them from the other students". Defence Minister Azeredo Lopes considered any discrimination "absolutely unacceptable".

=== Romania ===
Homosexuals are allowed to serve openly in the Romanian army. According to the Ministry of Defence's recruitment policy, "it is the right of every Romanian citizen to take part in the military structures of our country, regardless of their sexual orientation."

=== Russia ===
Before 1993, homosexual acts between consenting males were against the law in Russia, and homosexuality was considered a mental disorder until adoption of ICD-10 in 1999, but even after that military medical expertise statute was in force to continue considering homosexuality a mental disorder which was a reason to deny homosexuals to serve in the military. On 1 July 2003, a new military medical expertise statute was adopted; it said people "who have problems with their identity and sexual preferences" can only be drafted during war times. However, this clause contradicted another clause of the same statute which stated that different sexual orientation should not be considered a deviation. This ambiguity was resolved by the Major-General of the Medical Service Valery Kulikov who clearly stated that the new medical statute "does not forbid people of non-standard sexual orientation from serving in the military." However, he added that people of non-standard sexual orientation should not reveal their sexual orientation while serving in the army because "other soldiers are not going to like that; they can be beaten". President Vladimir Putin said in a U.S. television interview in 2010 that openly gay men were not excluded from military service in Russia. In 2013, it was reported that the Defense Ministry had issued a guideline on assessment of new recruits' mental health that recommends recruits be asked about their sexual history and be examined for certain types of tattoos, especially genital or buttocks tattoos, that would allegedly indicate a homosexual orientation.

In April and May 2023 there was a proposed crackdown on gender transition. The Russian State Duma considered passing new laws to prevent trans women from changing their legal gender from male to female without surgery. The proposed changes, as first discussed by the Russian Minister of Justice, Konstantin Chuychenko, in April were to "rule out the possibility of changing a person's gender purely by changing the documents." Duma Committee on Family, Women, and Children's Affairs head Nina Ostanina said: "Amendments will soon be introduced in the State Duma to officially ban gender reassignment without surgery". In part it was claimed to be protecting "family values" in Russia. However, Russian men have considered changing their legal gender to avoid being drafted. According to one Russian source "In connection with the special operation, many young men have turned to private clinics to provide a sex change to avoid conscription." Vyacheslav Volodin, Speaker of the Duma, claims that some "2,700" such decisions have been made in "recent times". In July 2023, Russia enacted a law banning gender transition which prohibited both gender-affirming surgery and legal gender recognition outright.

=== San Marino ===
The Sammarinese Armed Forces does not explicitly ban LGBT people from serving. The code of conduct of the police force prohibits unfair discrimination in recruitment. Furthermore, police officials are trained to properly respond to and identify discrimination, whether in public or within the police force itself.

=== Serbia ===
In May 2010, the head of the Serbian military (Vojska Srbije) announced that the Serbian Army would accept homosexuals to join. However, this news was not widely covered by media.

=== Singapore ===
Prior to 2003, homosexuals were barred from being employed in "sensitive positions" within the Singapore Civil Service. During the 20th century, some conscripts in National Service were encouraged to attend conversion therapy. In the past, some Singaporean conscripts who openly declared their homosexuality may also be excluded from officer training, including being refused security clearances needed to perform higher roles in the army.

=== Slovakia ===
LGBT people are allowed to serve openly in the Slovak Armed Forces. As the Anti-Discrimination Act prohibits discrimination on the basis of sexual orientation, it also applies to the military.

In 2005, Pravda reported that "the military has a very homophobic environment that is hostile and intolerant of any manifestations and indications of homosexuality."

=== Slovenia ===
Slovenia allows individuals to serve openly without discrimination or harassment due to actual or perceived sexual orientation.

=== South Africa ===
LGBT people are allowed to serve openly in the South African National Defence Force (SANDF). In 1996, the government adopted the White Paper on National Defence, which included the statement that, "In accordance with the Constitution, the SANDF shall not discriminate against any of its members on the grounds of sexual orientation."

In 1998, the Department of Defence adopted a Policy on Equal Opportunity and Affirmative Action, under which recruits may not be questioned about their sexual orientation and the Defence Force officially takes no interest in the lawful sexual behaviour of its members.

The Defence Act of 2002 makes it a criminal offence for any SANDF member or Defence Department employee to "denigrate, humiliate or show hostility or aversion" to any person on the grounds of sexual orientation. In 2002, the SANDF extended spousal medical and pension benefits to "partners in a permanent life-partnership".

=== Spain ===
Homosexuals are allowed to serve openly in the Spanish Army. As of 2009, after the case of Aitor G.R, the courts also ruled that transgender individuals are also permitted to serve in the military.

=== Sweden ===
Sweden allows homosexuals to serve openly and was amongst the first nations in the world to allow LGBT people to do so. Gay men could serve openly even before homosexuality was demedicalized (in 1979), as there was no ban on homosexuality in the nation's military. Since 1987 all kind of discrimination, military employment included, due to sexual orientation is banned by constitution. Since 2008 this ban also includes transgender people.

The Swedish Armed Forces states that it actively work for an environment where individuals do not feel it to be necessary to hide their sexual orientation or gender identity. In 2015, they launched a Pride campaign featuring a soldier in uniform with the rainbow flag badget to her arm. The text's bold letters translates to "Some things you should not have to camouflage," followed by the text "Equality is an essential ingredient in a democracy," say the Swedish Armed Forces. "In the military, we treat them with respect and see the differences of others as a fortress. We are an inclusive organisation where all the people who serve and contribute feel welcome and respected."

=== Switzerland ===
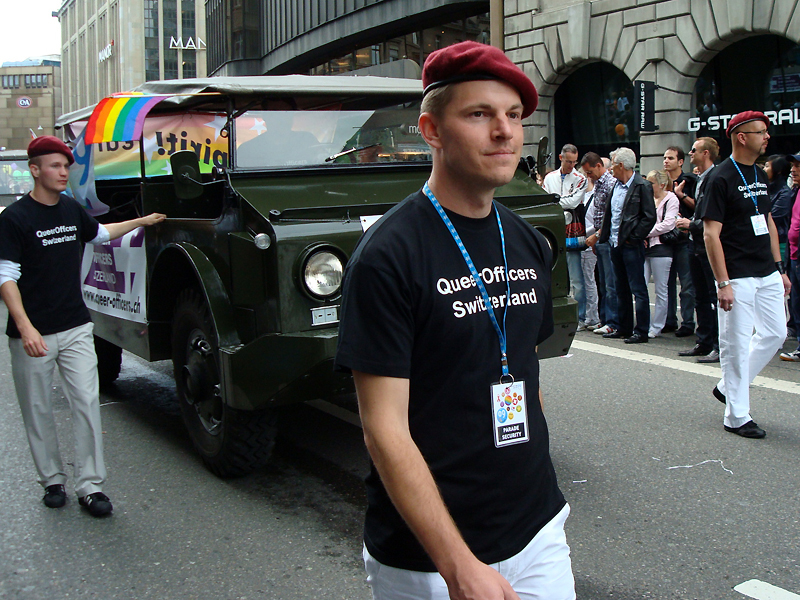
Swiss military officers participating at Europride 2009 in Zürich

Switzerland's military policies also allow for gay men and lesbians to serve openly without discrimination or harassment due to actual or perceived sexual orientation.

=== Taiwan ===
Taiwan repealed its ban on conscripting gay people into the military in 2002. Following an announcement by the Republic of China Armed Forces that it would end a policy banning gays from guarding high level officials and government installations, scholars and military officials said the decision signaled a bold step for an Asian military force. The policy change was announced after a local newspaper revealed the discriminatory practice, prompting protest demonstrations in Taipei, the nation's capital.

Col. Liu of the ROC Naval Attache said that ending the ban on gays in the military police was "a good thing for a democratic society like ours. I don't think this is really a big deal," he said. "It just means Taiwanese society is more open and there are different choices now. If you're gay and you can do the job, that's fine."

=== Thailand ===
In 2005, the Thai armed forces lifted its ban on LGBT serving in the military. Prior to this reform, LGBT people were exempted as suffering from a "mental disorder" law of 1954.

=== Ukraine ===
According to law, homosexuality is not a reason for exemption from the army. A 2007 report wrote that many young gay men tried to avoid call-up to military service, as they were afraid to face unauthorized relations and other difficulties. In 2018, Viktor Pylypenko, who had served in the war in Donbas for two years, became the first Ukrainian soldier to come out publicly. In 2019, several gay soldiers in the Ukrainian army participated in a photo exhibition called "We are here". In 2021, Pylypenko was trying to organize a special unit in the Ukrainian army for LGBTQ soldiers. In July 2021, Pylypenko stated there were 16 open LGBTQ soldiers in the Ukrainian army.

The 2022 Russian invasion resulted in an increased influx of openness and acceptance regarding LGBTQ soldiers in the Ukrainian military. A growing number of soldiers disclosed their identity, believing that they could fight not just for their home country but also against existing stereotypes. The invasion also saw the spread of "unicorn insignia" which Ukrainian LGBTQ soldiers sew onto their uniforms. The unicorn was chosen due to its nature as "fantastic 'non-existent' creature", sarcastically countering claims about there being no LGBT+ individuals in the Ukrainian military.

The non-governmental organisation Ukrainian LGBT+ Military Personnel and Veterans for Equal Rights includes more than 500 LGBTQ soldiers and veterans as of 2025. The organisation defends the rights of LGBTQ soldiers and veterans, and works to support veterans after their return from war. In July 2026, the organisation launched an educational course about LGBTQ people in the military, featuring Pylypenko, Oleksandr Demenko, and others as presenters. The course is available on the Diia.Education platform and is aimed at military personnel, with the goal of improving inclusion and reducing discrimination in the military.

=== United Kingdom ===
Until 2000, the British Ministry of Defence (MOD) policy was to continue the long-standing ban on homosexuals joining any of the Armed Forces.

The United Kingdom is a country comprising four constituent countries with different legal systems. All which now allow for same-sex marriage, the first of which was England and Wales (March 2014), then by Scotland ( December 2014), and finlally Northern Ireland (January 2020). Prior to this, same-sex couples could, and still can, obtain a civil partnership which is similar to a common-law marriage, barring some legal differences.

UK military same-sex couples can now, therefore get married across all legal jurisdictions in the UK, and since the introduction of civil partnerships (in 2004), have been able to receive equal benefits (in marriages) to that of straight couples serving within the UK armed forces.

=== United States ===
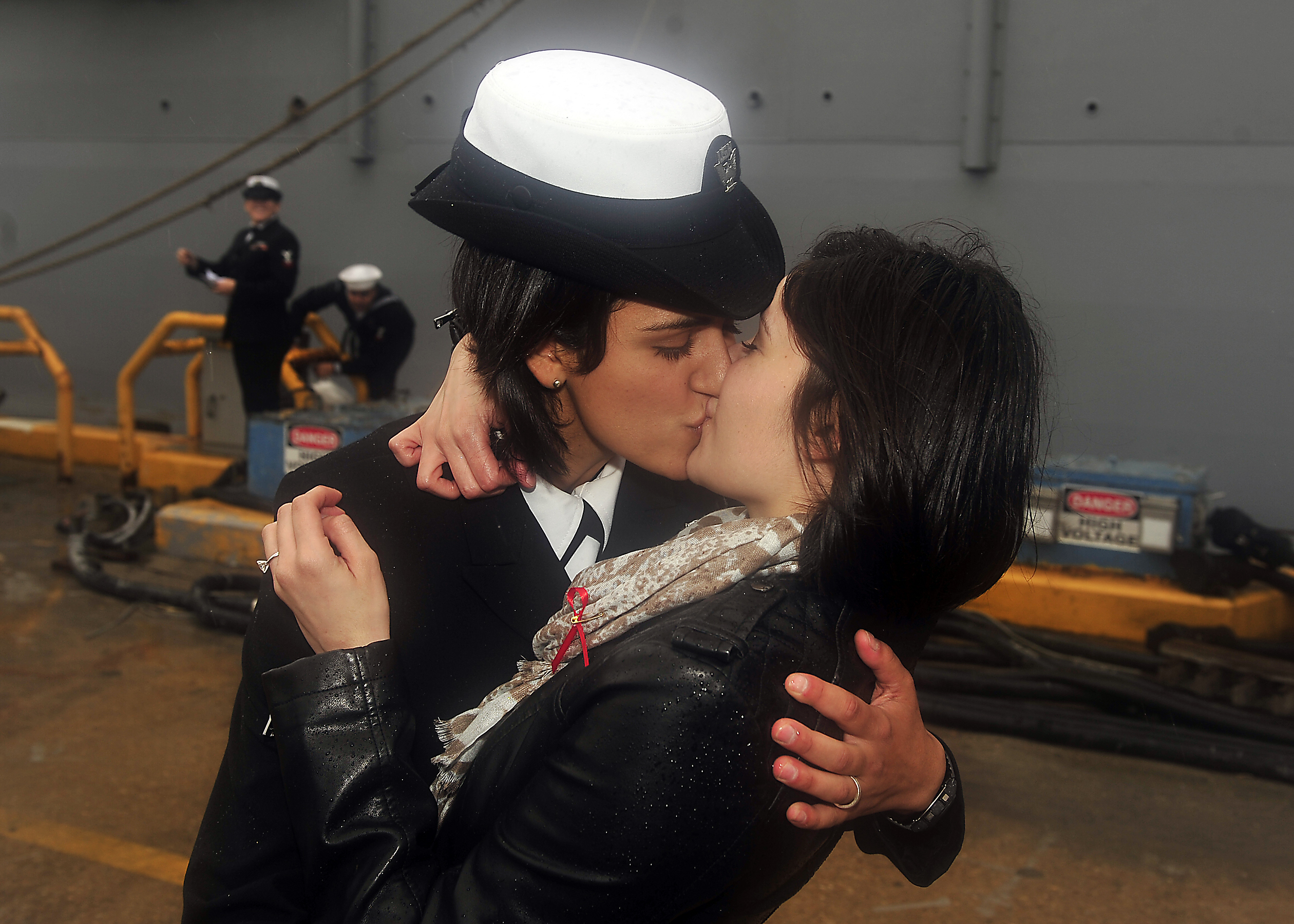
A US Navy sailor kissing her fiancé, who is also a member of the Navy, after disembarking at the end of a deployment in December 2011

Gay people are allowed to serve openly in the United States military. Military policy and legislation had previously forbidden them to serve, and later to serve openly, but these prohibitions were ended in September 2011 after the U.S. Congress voted to repeal the policy.

The first time homosexuals were differentiated from non-homosexuals in the military literature was in revised Army mobilization regulations in 1942. Additional policy revisions in 1944 and 1947 further codified the ban. Throughout the next few decades, homosexuals were routinely discharged, regardless of whether they had engaged in sexual conduct while serving. In response to the gay rights movements of the 1970s and 1980s, including the famed "Copy" Berg case, the Department of Defense issued a 1982 policy (DOD Directive 1332.14) stating that homosexuality was clearly incompatible with military service. Controversy over this policy created political pressure to amend the policy, with socially liberal efforts seeking a repeal of the ban and socially conservative groups wishing to reinforce it by statute.

A legislative policy was enacted in a 1993 bill signed by President Bill Clinton. The new policy continued the ban under which homosexuals were prohibited from serving in the military and their discharge was required. The main change that the new policy made was to prohibit investigation into a member's sexual orientation without suspicion. The new policy was known as "Don't ask, don't tell" and was seen as a compromise between the two political efforts.

Pressure to overturn the ban continued to build throughout the 1990s and 2000s, as public opposition to gay rights waned. In December 2010, the House and Senate, under a Democratic majority, passed a bill that President Barack Obama signed into law as the Don't Ask, Don't Tell Repeal Act of 2010. The law established a future pathway to allow homosexuals to serve in the military. Under the terms of the bill, the "Don't ask, don't tell" policy remained in place until the President, the Secretary of Defense, and the Chairman of the Joint Chiefs certified that repeal would not harm military readiness, followed by a 60 days waiting period. In early 2011, military leaders began issuing training plans for the expected repeal of the ban. A court order on July 6, 2011, required the Pentagon to immediately suspend the ban, which the government complied with. The legislative repeal of the ban took effect on September 20, 2011.

One year after repeal, a study published by the Palm Center found that openly gay service has not resulted in a negative net impact to the U.S. military.

Per the U.S. Supreme Court's decision in United States v. Windsor, lawful same-sex spouses are afforded the same rights as heterosexual spouses. This policy was codified by Congress via the Respect For Marriage Act.

=== Uruguay ===
Homosexuals were prohibited from serving in the Uruguayan armed forces under the 1973–1985 military dictatorship, however this prohibition was lifted in 2009 when a new decree was signed by Defence Minister José Bayardi which provided that sexual orientation would no longer be considered a reason to prevent people from entering the armed forces.

=== Venezuela ===
LGBT people can serve openly in the military since a 16 March 2023 ruling by the Supreme Court of Justice annulled section 565 of the Military Justice Code, in force since 1998, which previously banned same-sex sexual activity. The court found that the law was unconstitutionally vague and that banning non-reproductive sex was incompatible with the Constitution and international agreements on human rights.

Article 565 stated "The official who commits acts that affront or debase their dignity or allow such acts without trying to stop it by means authorized by law, shall be punished with imprisonment of one to three years and separation of the Armed Forces. The same penalty shall apply to any military who commit sexual acts against nature."

Previously, a number of cases had been known where members of the military have been harassed or dismissed for being gay.

== Countries with ambiguous policies ==
=== North Korea ===
The North Korean military law mandates celibacy during the first ten years of service for all enlistees, without regard to their sexual orientation or gender of any sexual partners. Reportedly, male soldiers regularly break this rule by engaging in casual heterosexual and homosexual affairs. These homosexual relationships have been described as situational sexual behavior rather than a sexual orientation. A defector has said that intimacy is particularly prevalent in cold, mountainous areas, during the ten years of mandatory service where it is impossible to have intimate interactions with women. Author Bradley Martin writes that such behavior, while not illegal, may result in execution.

=== South Korea ===
Civil rights for homosexual citizens are guaranteed in South Korea under the Korean Human Rights Committee Law, but in practice homosexuals may still face discrimination during military service, which is mandatory for all male citizens. Conscripts are profiled at the time of enlistment and homosexuals may be categorized as having a "mental handicap" or "personality disorder", which may lead to a dishonourable discharge.

Article 92 of the Military Penal Code categorizes sexual relations between members of the same sex as "sexual harassment", regardless of whether it is consensual. Consensual sex between homosexuals may be regarded as "reciprocal rape", punishable by up to a year's imprisonment for both parties. These laws and practices have faced legal challenges during recent years.

South Korea is the only developed nation that does not allow LGBT individuals to serve.

== Council of Europe ==
In multiple cases—Lustig-Prean and Beckett v UK (1999), Smith and Grady v UK (1999), Perkin and R v UK (2002) and Beck, Copp and Bazeley v UK (2002)—the European Court of Human Rights found that barring homosexual and bisexual individuals from military service violates article 8 of the European Convention on Human Rights. In 2010, ten European Union countries still did not allow homosexuals to serve openly: Bulgaria, Romania, Greece, Hungary, Poland, Portugal, Lithuania, Malta, Slovakia, and Cyprus.
