= 2023 Bryansk Oblast raid =

Incident on the Russia-Ukraine border

- Part of the 2022–23 Western Russia attacks and 2022 Belarusian and Russian partisan movement
- Russian Volunteer Corps fighters with their flag in front of a building in Bryansk Oblast
- Location: Lyubechane and Sushany, Bryansk Oblast
- Date: 2 March 2023; Timing of Russian reports: 11:30–14:30 (MSK, UTC+3)
- Attack type: Asymmetric engagement Subversion
- Deaths: 2 (per Russia) (Note: Novaya Gazeta Europe (Russian version): "According to TASS, the "saboteurs" attacked two villages, Lubechane and Sushany. As a result, two civilians were killed and two were injured.")
- Injuries: 2 (per Russia)
- Perpetrators: Russian Volunteer Corps; Ukraine (per Russia)

On 2 March 2023, the Russian authorities said that an armed Ukrainian group crossed the border and attacked the villages of Lyubechane and Sushany in Bryansk Oblast. Russia said the attackers fired on a car, killing two civilians, before the Federal Security Service forced them back into Ukraine. The raid was claimed by the Russian Volunteer Corps; a paramilitary group of Russian citizens, based in Ukraine, which opposes the Russian regime of Vladimir Putin. (Note: In the immediate aftermath, Ukrainian officials have said that the group is independent.) Russia called the incident a terrorist attack, and said its 9 March missile strikes on Ukraine were retaliation. Ukraine's government denied involvement; it said the incident could have been a false-flag attack by Russia to justify its ongoing war against Ukraine, or else an attack by anti-government partisans from within Russia.

== Background ==
There have been attacks in mainland Russia as a result of the Russo-Ukrainian war since its invasion of Ukraine on 24 February 2022. The main targets have been the military, the arms industry and the oil industry. Many of the attacks have been drone strikes, firebombing, and rail sabotage. The Ukrainian intelligence services have acknowledged carrying out some of these attacks. Others have been carried out by anti-war activists in Russia. There have also been cross-border shelling, missile strikes, and covert raids from Ukraine, mainly in Belgorod, Kursk, and Bryansk oblasts. Several times, Ukrainian-based paramilitaries launched incursions into Russia, captured border villages and battled the Russian military. These were carried out by units made up mainly of Russian emigrants. While Ukraine supported these ground incursions, it denied direct involvement.

In early February 2023, Bryansk Oblast authorities claimed that they had been strengthening the border with Ukraine. The Governor of Bryansk Oblast Alexander Bogomaz posted photos from a meeting with "commanders of the group protecting the border" on his Telegram channel, and stated that "the work done on the construction of protective structures and strongpoints was highly appreciated by the command of the Russian Armed Forces."

== Raid ==
=== Initial Russian reports ===
On 2 March 2023, at around 11:30 MSK, Bogomaz reported that a Ukrainian sabotage and reconnaissance group made an incursion into Russian territory, entering the village of Lyubechane, Klimovsky District. According to him, the saboteurs fired at a moving car, killing one adult and injuring a child. It was reported that the passenger car was transporting children to a class. Subsequent to this initial report, TASS reported, citing a law enforcement source, that the group had penetrated into two villages, Lubechane and Sushany, and took several residents hostage. According to RFE/RL, a Russian Telegram channel posting local news reported that residents in the area heard explosions and gunfire.

According to TASS, "members of the Rosgvardia entered into a clash with the militants". At 14:30, TASS, citing eyewitnesses, wrote that the "Ukrainian saboteurs" had ceased showing signs of activity and may have left Russian territory. "There is no one from the Ukrainian group on the territory of the Russian Federation, they all left. Now there is a search, possibly, for the remaining fighters of the VSU on our territory", said one of the agency's sources.

=== Official Russian account ===
The Russian government said that a Ukrainian sabotage group entered the Russian village of Lyubechane and fired on civilians in a car. The Governor of Bryansk Oblast, Alexander Bogomaz, said two civilians were killed and an 11-year-old boy was wounded.

Russia's Federal Security Service (FSB) said it acted together with the Russian military to "eliminate armed Ukrainian nationalists who violated the state border". It later said that the attackers had been pushed back into Ukraine "where a massive artillery strike was inflicted on them". According to FSB, a large number of explosive devices had been found and demining was underway. The FSB did not mention the earlier report about a hostage-taking.

== Claim of responsibility ==
Responsibility for the raid was claimed by the Russian Volunteer Corps (RDK; Russian: Русский добровольческий корпус, romanized: Russkiy dobrovol'cheskiy korpus), an armed group of far-right anti-government Russian nationalists fighting for Ukraine. (Note: Novaya Gazeta Europe: "The neo-Nazi movement Russian Volunteer Corps, a unit of Russian military volunteers fighting for Ukraine, claimed responsibility for the attack.")

Two videos posted online on 2 March show armed men in combat gear calling themselves the Russian Volunteer Corps. They say they crossed the border to fight "the bloody Putinite and Kremlin regime". Describing themselves as Russian "liberators", they called upon citizens to revolt against the government, and denied firing on civilians. One of the videos seems to have been filmed outside Lyubechane medical clinic. According to an analysis by the American think tank Institute for the Study of War, social media users geolocated one of the two videos to Sushany.

RDK's leader Denis Kapustin said that the aim was to expose how weakly guarded Russia's border areas are and to inspire armed opposition against "Kremlin usurpers". According to him, the 45-strong attacking force included anti-government insurgents based in Russia, and acted with Ukraine's backing. On the day of the raid, Russian investigative journalism website iStories published an RDK member's account of the event; he said: "There were 45 of us on that mission. We went in, filmed, ambushed two BMPs. I didn't see any children injured. But there was one injured border guard. No hostages were taken." Kapustin confirmed in an interview with the Financial Times that a shootout had taken place in one of the villages. He added that he was unaware of any civilian casualties. Kapustin also stated that had the raid not been coordinated with Ukraine, all its participants would have been killed. At the same time, the publication noted that reports of support from Kyiv remain unclear and are extremely difficult to verify in wartime conditions.

== Aftermath ==
=== Reactions ===
The President of Russia, Vladimir Putin, said in a televised address that Ukrainian neo-Nazi "terrorists" crossed the border and targeted civilians. Putin said the attack confirmed that Russia did the right thing by invading Ukraine. "They won't achieve anything. We will crush them," Putin said, claiming the group consisted of people who wanted to strip Russia of its history and language. Russia officially treats the event as an act of terrorism, and the Investigative Committee of the Russian Federation has initiated a terrorism probe.

The Ukrainian government and military denied carrying out a cross-border raid, and suggested Russia could use the allegations to justify further attacks on Ukraine. Mykhailo Podolyak, adviser to the President of Ukraine, wrote on Twitter: "The story of a Ukrainian sabotage group in the Russian Federation is a classic deliberate provocation". He said Russia "wants to scare its people to justify attacking another country and growing poverty after a year of war." He told the Associated Press: "This was done by the Russians; Ukraine has nothing to do with it". Podolyak suggested the attack could have been carried out by an anti-government group within Russia, saying: "The partisan movement in the Russian Federation is getting stronger and more aggressive".

According to a report by The New York Times, "Ukraine intelligence officials have tried to portray the incident as evidence of Russian divisions"; Andriy Cherniak, a representative of the Ukrainian Main Directorate of Intelligence (GUR) was cited as saying: "This is a sign that Russia can no longer function normally and this leads to internal destruction". Separately, he noted that the Russian Volunteer Corps claimed responsibility, and indicated that Ukraine was not involved. Andriy Yusov, another GUR representative, suggested that the composition of the armed group was a sign of an internal struggle within Russia, and characterized the event as a "confrontation within the Russian Federation itself between the citizens of the Russian Federation".

=== Russian "retaliatory attack" ===
On 9 March Russia attacked Ukraine with an estimated 81 missiles. The Ukrainian military said 34 missiles were shot down, a lower than usual rate due to Russia shifting to new technologies. Russia claimed it carried out a "massive retaliatory strike" as payback. Russia's attack included an unprecedented six Kinzhal hypersonic missiles. Kyiv, Odesa and Kharkiv regions were hit, leaving 40% of civilians in Kyiv without heat, and electricity outages in Odesa. At least five people were killed by the strikes in Zolochiv, Lviv region and one civilian was killed in Dnipro region. The attack again damaged electricity supplies to Zaporizhzhia Nuclear Power Plant, forcing it onto emergency diesel generators. Rafael Grossi, head of the IAEA said "Each time we are rolling a dice. And if we allow this to continue time after time then one day our luck will run out".

=== Other later events ===
On 9 March, a video was released of some hooded and armed fighters claiming to be against "the regime of Putin" and inciting people to join them in front of the entrance sign to the village of Plekhovo, in Kursk Oblast, Russia.

In late May, RVC, and other rebel groups allied with Ukraine began making more sizable incursions into Belgorod Oblast, Russia.

== See also ==
- 2023 Belgorod Oblast incursions
- March 2024 western Russia incursion
