= Denis Kapustin (militant) =

Russian neo-Nazi and militant (born 1984)

- Денис Капустин
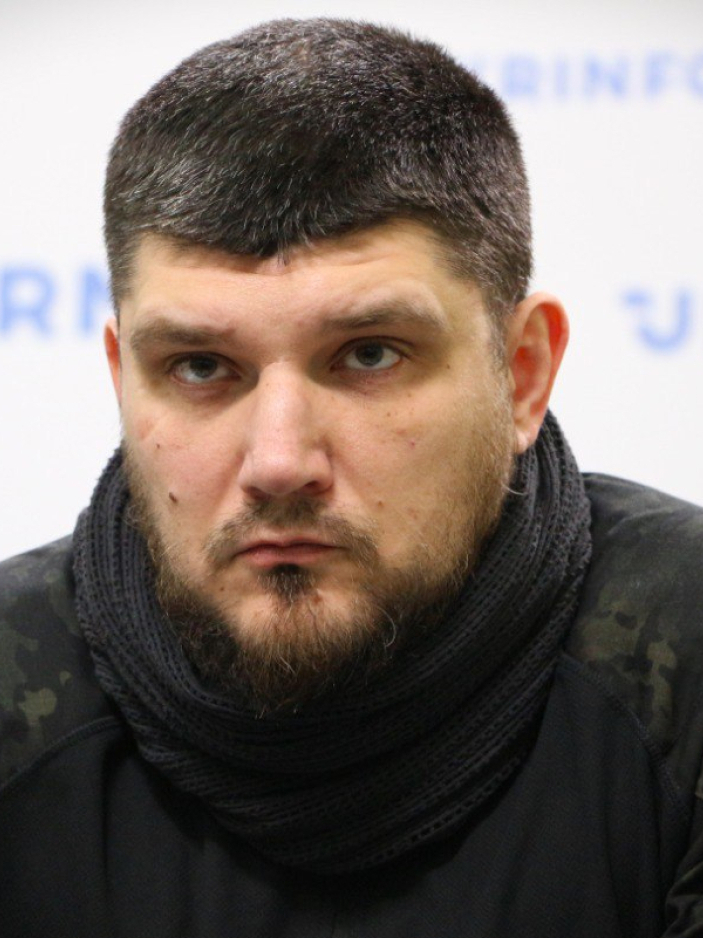
- Kapustin in 2024
- Born: 6 March 1984 (age 42); Moscow, Russian SFSR, Soviet Union
- Other name: Denis Nikitin
- Military career
- Allegiance: Ukraine
- Service years: 2022–present
- Rank: Commander
- Nickname: White Rex
- Commands: Russian Volunteer Corps
- Conflicts: Russo-Ukrainian war; Bryansk Oblast raid; Belgorod Oblast incursions; Western Russia Incursion
- Awards: Order of Bohdan Khmelnytsky, III class

Denis Yevgenyevich Kapustin (Russian: Денис Евгеньевич Капустин; born 6 March 1984), also known as Denis Nikitin (Денис Никитин) or by his nom de guerre White Rex, is a Russian neo-Nazi activist and militant. After moving to Ukraine, he founded the Russian Volunteer Corps (RVC) in 2022 and has been the group's leader, fighting on the side of Ukraine in the Russo-Ukrainian war.

== Early life ==
Kapustin was born on 6 March 1984, and raised in a middle class family in Moscow. In 2001, when he was 17, Kapustin and his parents moved to Cologne, Germany, under a program related to Jewish ancestry. Kapustin said his family is Russian, while his maternal grandfather, Efim Aronovich Karpmanskiy, was Jewish. Kapustin attended school in Moscow and in Germany, then studied international business at University College Maastricht in the Netherlands but did not graduate.

== Football hooliganism and mixed martial arts ==
Kapustin entered the football hooliganism scene in Germany, where he was a hooligan for his local Cologne team. He said later that in 2004, he had been "just a common street gang skinhead, bashing immigrants in the street, setting their cars on fire, like breaking faces, whole program."

At age 22, Kapustin returned to Moscow and subsequently joined Yaroslavka, a football hooligan group related to CSKA Moscow. He was deeply rooted in the football hooliganism scene and led a small group during the riots at the 2016 European Football Championship in the port of Marseille. Radicalized by his involvement in German hooliganism, he participated in hooligan fights and attacks on minority groups before shifting focus from street violence towards promoting his views. He said that street violence was ineffective because "if we kill one immigrant every day, that's 365 immigrants in a year. But tens of thousands more will come anyway", while promoting his views on social media was more effective as it addressed the "underlying reason".

After identifying a demand for far-right clothing in Russia and re-selling clothes by Thor Steinar, Kapustin launched his own clothing brand, White Rex, which featured violent, white nationalist, and xenophobic elements. (Note: The White Rex brand expressed support for the white supremacist slogan Fourteen Words, featured the Black Sun logo favoured by neo-Nazi groups, and offered T-shirts with the symbol 88, representing the greeting Heil Hitler in the far-right scene.) He wanted the brand to be a National Socialist complete outfitter. Under the same label, Kapustin organised and facilitated meet-ups of radical right groups in Europe and across Russia through mixed martial arts events. He also offered martial arts seminars and weapon training from Wales to Switzerland, and maintained good contacts in the fan scenes of Sparta Prague and Legia Warsaw. He appeared as a fighter and speaker at the "Kampf der Nibelungen" (Battle of the Nibelungs) event. In Switzerland, Kapustin provided combat training to members of the far-right Swiss Nationalist Party (PNOS). He also gave training to members of National Action, a British neo-Nazi group banned by the U.K. government. In 2013, he spoke at the Iona right-wing forum held in London, and in 2014, he taught martial arts to British nationalists at the Sigurd Cultural Camp.

In 2019, Germany revoked Kapustin's residence permit due to his hooliganism-related activities, and issued him an entry ban into Europe's Schengen Area for "efforts against the liberal democratic constitution" and his significant contribution to professionalizing the right-wing extremist martial arts scene.

== Ukraine and Russian Volunteer Corps ==
Kapustin was in Kyiv for Euromaidan in 2014, and moved to Ukraine in 2017. He worked with the Azov movement in Ukraine. For example, he travelled with National Corps international secretary Olena Semeniaka to participate in a far-right conference in Warsaw in November 2017, and organised mixed martial arts events at Azov's Reconquista Club.

In August 2022, Kapustin founded the Russian Volunteer Corps (RVC), a unit composed of Russians fighting against Russia on the side of Ukraine. He was awarded the Order of Bohdan Khmelnytsky III class in 2026.

According to Ukrainian war veteran Viktor Pylypenko and activist Diana Berg, Kapustin attempted to tear away an LGBT flag carried by Pylypenko at the 2025 funeral of artist and military serviceman Davyd Chychkan, which resulted in a fight stopped by both being pepper sprayed.

=== 2023 incursions into Russia ===
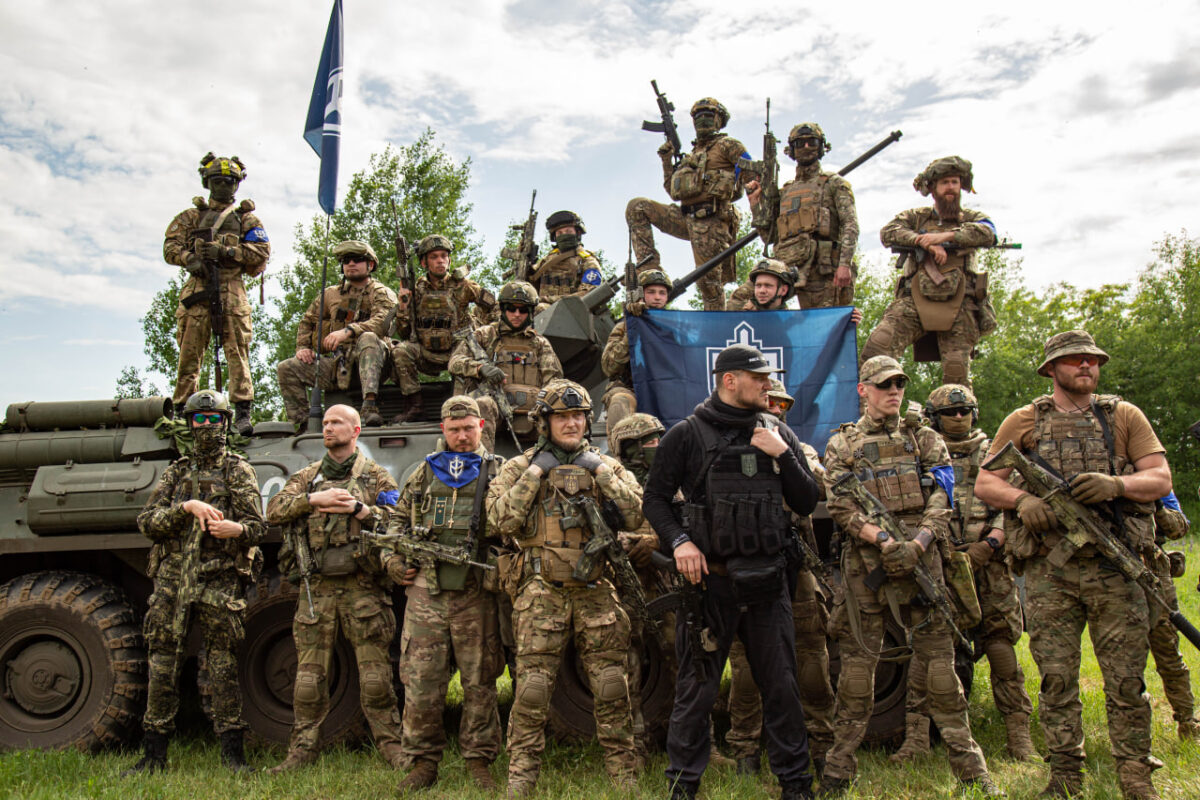
Russian Volunteer Corps members during a press conference on 24 May 2023; Kapustin in the front in a black uniform

In March 2023, Kapustin and several other RVC members performed an incursion into Russia's Bryansk Oblast. On 22 May, Kapustin and the RVC were involved in the Belgorod Oblast attack, a cross-border raid into Russia's Belgorod Oblast. On 24 May, he said the group had left Russian territory after 24 hours, and that they were satisfied with the raid at a press conference given on Ukrainian territory.

Following the March incursion, Kapustin was added to Rosfinmonitoring's list of terrorists and extremists. Russia's Federal Security Service said it had foiled an attempt to assassinate Konstantin Malofeev organized by Kapustin, and stated the RVC was involved in an attack on an oil and gas plant in Volgograd Oblast in 2022. Russia's 2nd Western District Military Court subsequently sentenced Kapustin in absentia to life imprisonment and also convicted him of treason and terrorist activities.

=== Staged death ===
On 27 December 2025, the RVC reported that Kapustin had been killed in a drone strike while fighting for Ukraine in its Zaporizhzhia Oblast and vowed to avenge his death. However, the following week, the Main Directorate of Intelligence of Ukraine (HUR) published a video of Kapustin and stated he was still alive. They said that Russian special services had ordered Kapustin's death, but the HUR had foiled the killing through a special operation lasting more than a month. The false reports of death were part of the special operation. The HUR reported having identified the individuals behind the assassination attempt and obtained half a million US dollars paid for the task.

== Political views ==
The Antifascist Europe monitoring project described Kapustin as a neo-Nazi and white supremacist. Pavel Klymenko, a Ukrainian researcher who studies football hooligans, described Kapustin in 2018 as holding "outright neo-Nazi ideology" such as "preaching racial war and the need to 'reconquer' the 'living space' of the white man in Europe." Kapustin has rejected such characterizations and said "you'll never find me waving a flag with a swastika, you'll never find me raising my hand in a Hitler sign." In a 2023 report, PBS found a clip of Kapustin from a 2013 mixed martial arts event where he appeared to mirror Nazi salutes given by the audience. Kapustin said to The Guardian in 2023 that although he believes "genocide and gas chambers are bad, regardless of who does it", he admires the culture, style and military of Nazi Germany. The Times wrote that Kapustin had been inspired by the ideology of Corneliu Codreanu.

Kapustin has said he believes in the Great Replacement conspiracy theory, that "European culture is definitely endangered", and that he opposes multiculturalism as well as "Islamisation", "cultural Marxism", and "LGBTQ propaganda". He has called himself a nationalist who believes that Russia belongs to ethnic Russians, and said his views were conservative, traditionalist, and right-wing. In 2018, ProPublica quoted journalist Karim Zidan saying that Kapustin had "repackaged older white supremacist ideas for a new generation, rebranding them as 'nationalist concepts'".

In 2024, Kapustin said the right-wing movement he belongs to was no longer about viewing immigrants as the enemy, but rather about opposing the government of Russian President Vladimir Putin, which he considers multiculturalist. He rejected the adulation of Putin as a white nationalist icon outside Russia, arguing that Moscow has the biggest Muslim population on the European continent. Regarding antisemitism, Kapustin has said he does not understand why his American counterparts who "seem to share" his ideology have an "obsession" with Jews and believe "Jews control everything".

Kapustin has said that the Russian Volunteer Corps has ideological lectures in addition to physical and military training, as he believes that "ideology is something that fortifies a unit". He said he would not accept a Black, homosexual, or transgender person into the RVC, because they "would not feel comfortable" around each other. In a separate interview, Kapustin said the RVC includes former supporters of Alexei Navalny, one of whom has more liberal political views than those of others in the unit.

== Influence ==
Kapustin has been described as a key figure of the European far-right political activists and hooligans. Named the "chief architect" of European far-right combat sports, he was the "definitive head" of the scene's tournament network from 2013 to 2019. According to Mother Jones, Kapustin's White Rex has inspired groups like the American Rise Above Movement. Its leader, Robert Rundo, has been reported to have a White Rex tattoo and co-hosted a podcast with Kapustin. The interior ministry of Herbert Reul in North Rhine-Westphalia, Germany, called Kapustin "one of the most influential neo-Nazi activists".

== Bibliography ==
- Robert Claus (2017): Hooligans. Eine Welt zwischen Fußball, Gewalt und Politik. Göttingen.
- Robert Claus (2020): "Kampfsport für weiße Europäer — Der 'Kampf der Nibelungen und sein Netzwerk'". In: Robert Claus: Ihr Kampf: Wie Europas extreme Rechte für den Umsturz trainiert, Bielefeld: Verlag Die Werkstatt, 2020. 55–75.
- Cynthia Miller-Idriss (2020): Hate in the Homeland: The New Global Far Right. Princeton.

== See also ==
- Maximilian Andronnikov
