= Krym Battalion =

- Добровольчий спецпідрозділ МВС України «Крим» (Ukrainian); Ukraina İçki işler nazirliginiñ göñülli mahsus bölügi «Qırım» (Crimean Tatar)
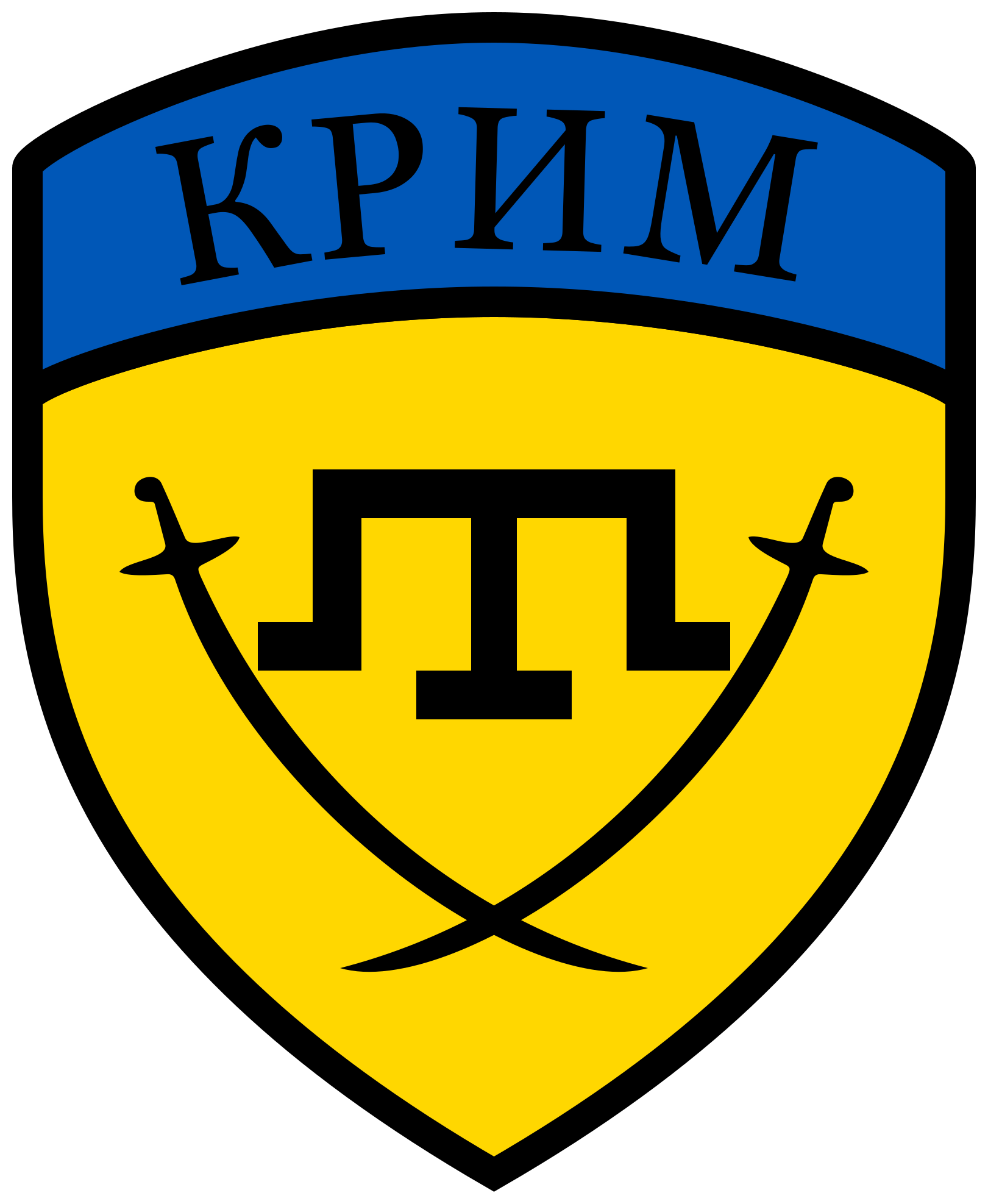
- Battalion's shoulder patch with 2 crossed sabers and a Tarak Tamga, the national symbol of the Crimean Tatars.
- Active: 2014 – present
- Country: Ukraine
- Role: Counterinsurgency
- Size: 600
- Part of: Ministry of Internal Affairs
- Garrison/HQ: Kherson, Kherson Oblast
- Engagements: Russo-Ukrainian War; War in Donbas; Battle of Krasnyi Lyman; Battle of Yasynuvata; Battle of Debaltseve

Commanders
- Current commander: Isa Akaiev

The Krym Battalion (Ukrainian: Батальйон «Крим», romanized: batalyon «Krym»; Crimean Tatar: «Qırım» batalyonı) is a Crimean Tatar military volunteer unit subordinated to the Ministry of Internal Affairs of Ukraine. Created in June 2014, until March 2015, it participated in anti-terrorist operations in Eastern Ukraine as part of a company of the Special Tasks Patrol Police unit Dnipro-1. The battalion is based in Kherson.

On November 12, 2014, the President of Ukraine, Petro Poroshenko, and the leader of the Crimean Tatar national movement, Mustafa Dzhemilev, announced the reformation of the Crimean Tatar company into a battalion.

In March 2022, it joined the International Legion of Territorial Defense of Ukraine while still being a part of Dnipro-1 Regiment.

== History ==
=== Formation ===
On April 14, 2014, then head of the Ministry of Internal Affairs of Ukraine, Arsen Avakov, signed an order on the creation of regional special units of the special police patrol service (ПСМОП), subordinate to the Ministry of Internal Affairs, based on civilian organizations.

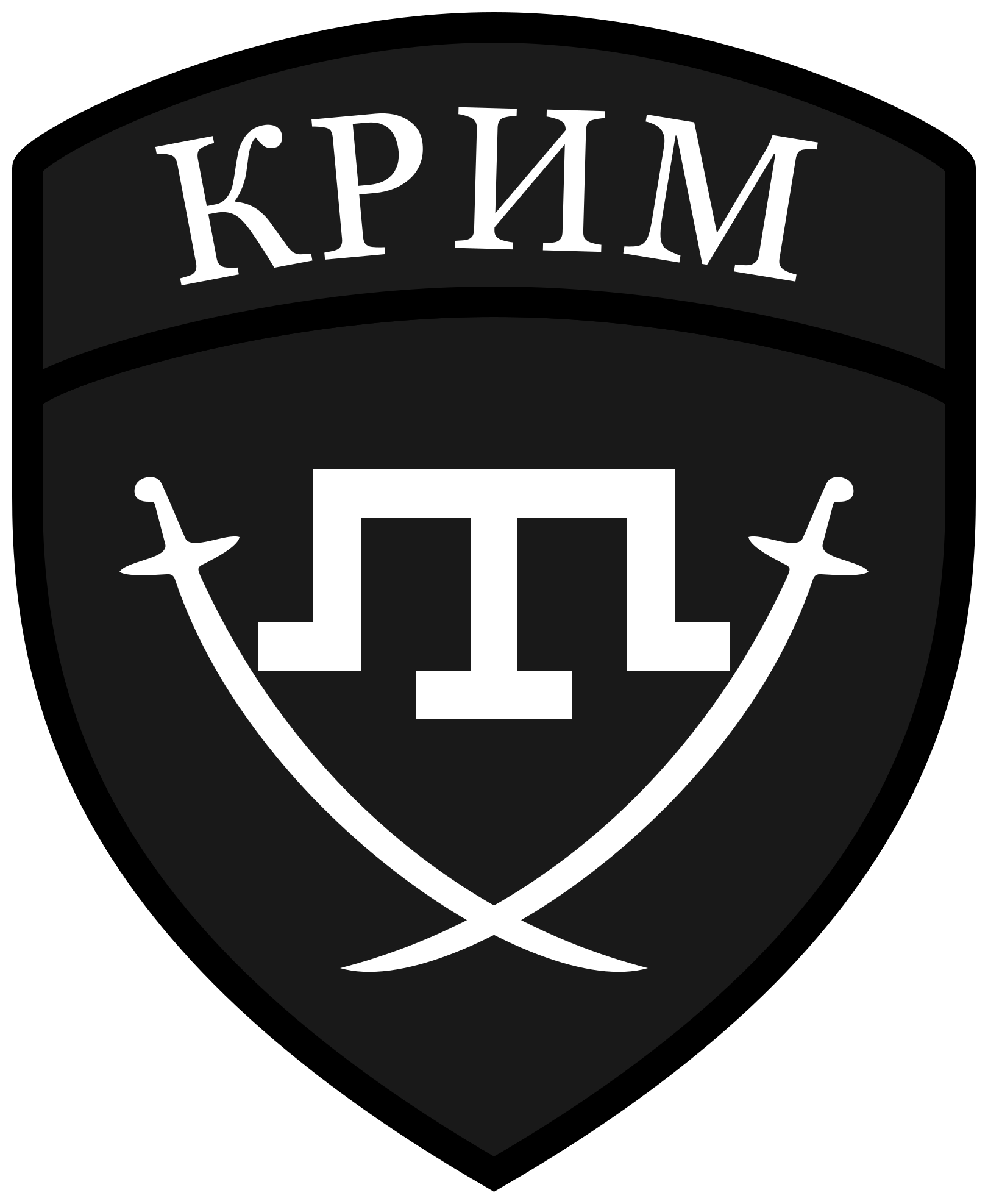
Low-Visiblity Patch

In a short period of time, the Ministry of Internal Affairs formed 30 volunteer battalions and companies of the special police patrol service with a total number of 5,660 people in different regions of Ukraine.

But at the same time, the Ministry of Internal Affairs and Communications of Ukraine in the Autonomous Republic of Crimea was de facto liquidated, which created a bureaucratic obstacle to the formation of a volunteer battalion based on the Crimean Tatar civil movement.

In early June, Dmytro Yarosh wrote on social media about the creation of a Crimean Tatar battalion under the auspices of the Right Sector to wage a partisan struggle on the peninsula. This project of Yarosh was not implemented.

In mid-June 2014, Semen Semenchenko, the commander of the newly created Donbas Battalion of the National Guard of Ukraine tried to overcome bureaucratic obstacles. He announced a plan to form a "Krym Battalion" of the National Guard as part of a future Independent National Guard Brigade «Donbas».

=== Combat ===
As part of an Independent "Crimean company" of the Dnipro-1 Regiment, volunteers took part in the Battle in Shakhtarsk Raion and the Battle of Ilovaisk, where they were surrounded. "Crimea" fighters reached Ilovaisk on August 19–20, when the threat of encirclement was already hanging over the volunteer battalions.

On August 29, the head of Sector "B" (Сектор "Б"), General Ruslan Khomchak, gave the command to withdraw from the encirclement with a retreat in two columns. "Crimea" fighters moved in a column of the "Dnipro-1" battalion. In the area of the village of Chabany, near Starobesheve, they came under fire, after which they broke through the encirclement in small groups. On August 30–31, reports about their breakthrough appeared in the press and social networks. During the escape from encirclement, the personnel of the «Krym» Battalion experienced losses.

=== Current status ===
Mustafa Dzhemilev said that as of mid-November 2014, about 450 Crimean Tatars defended the sovereignty and independence of Ukraine in the ATO zone

It is not necessary that this military unit be purely Crimean Tatar, but it will be good if they are not scattered in different parts so that they can communicate in their native language, the religious factor must be taken into account. ... It is better that the Crimean Tatars serve in the Kherson region. In addition to the proximity to Crimea, thousands of Crimean Tatars live there who never returned to Crimea. ... One way or another, Crimea will be liberated someday.
