= Lyubechane =

Lyubechane Любечане
- Location within Bryansk Oblast Location within European Russia Location within Russia
- Coordinates: 52.333579°N 32.353481°E
- Country: Russia
- Oblast: Bryansk Oblast
- District: Klimovsky District
- First mentioned: 1620
- Elevation: 155 m (509 ft)

Lyubechane (Russian: Любечане) is a village (selo) in Russia, located in Klimovsky District, Bryansk Oblast.

== Geography ==
The village is located in southwestern Bryansk Oblast, in the Polesian Lowland. It is near to Russia's state border with Ukraine. It is located 9 kilometres (5.6 mi) southeast from Klimovo, the administrative center of the district. It is located 155 metres (509 ft) above sea level, and has a temperate, continental climate.

== History ==
The oldest written mention of the village comes from 1620, when it was part of the Starodub County in the Smolensk Voivodeship in the Polish–Lithuanian Commonwealth. In the mid-17th century it became part of the Cossack Hetmanate, and later annexed by Russia.

On 2 March 2023, the village was attacked by pro-Ukrainian forces during the Russo-Ukrainian War.

== Demographics ==
From 2010 to 2013, the population of the settlement decreased from 264 to 236.

According to the 2002 Russian census, Russians made up 93% of the population, which at the time was 343.
