= Sushany =

Sushany Сушаны
- Location within Bryansk Oblast Location within Russia
- Coordinates: 52.193733°N 32.304999°E
- Country: Russia
- Oblast: Bryansk Oblast
- District: Klimovsky District
- Elevation: 145 m (476 ft)

Sushany (Russian: Сушаны) is a village (selo) in western Russia, located in the Klimovsky District of Bryansk Oblast.

== Geography ==
The village is located in southwestern Bryansk Oblast, in the Polesian Lowland. It is near Russia's state border with Ukraine. It is located 18 kilometres (11 mi) southeast of Klimovo, the district's administrative centre. It is located 145 metres (476 ft) above sea level and has a temperate, continental climate.

== History ==
On 2 March 2023, the village was attacked by pro-Ukrainian forces during the Russo-Ukrainian War.

== Demographics ==
From 2010 to 2013, the population of the settlement decreased from 200 to 180.

According to the 2002 Russian census, Russians made up 96% of the population, which at the time was 269.
