= Zaporizhzhia Institute of Economics and Information Technologies =

Private university in Zaporizhzhia, Ukraine

Coordinates: 47.87171°N 35.06755°E

- Інститут економіки та інформаційних технологій (ЗІЕІТ)
- Type: Private
- Accreditation: Ministry of Education and Science of Ukraine (highest level)
- Affiliations: Ministry of Education and Science of Ukraine
- Location: Zaporizhzhia, Ukraine
- Campus: Urban
- Website: www.zieit.edu.ua

The Zaporizhzhia Institute of Economics and Information Technologies (abbr. ZIEIT, Ukrainian: Запорізький інститут економіки та інформаційних технологій, ЗІЕІТ) is a private institute of higher education in the city of Zaporizhzhia, Ukraine, with branches in the cities of Melitopol and Kryvyi Rih. ZIEIT offers Bachelor's, Specialist's, and Master's degrees in various technical and economic specializations. ZIEIT is certified by the Ministry of Education of Ukraine.

== History ==
By Protocol No. 97 dated July 13, 2012, the State Accreditation Commission of the Ministry of Education and Science, Youth and Sports of Ukraine granted ZIEIT accreditation at the fourth (highest) level.

== Specializations ==
- Economic Cybernetics;
- Economics of a Firm;
- International Economics;
- Finance;
- Accounting and Audit;
- Taxation;
- Marketing;
- Management of Organizations;
- Computer Systems and Networks;
- Applied Mathematics;
- Translation;
- Industrial and Civil Construction;
- Building Constructions, Products and Materials Technology.

== Subdivisions ==
Mass media: The university publishes two periodicals - "Zarichna Street" and "Sports Street"

The institute also has separate divisions in Melitopol and Kryvyi Rih

- Lyceum of Economics and Information Technology
- ZIEIT College
- Military Department
