= Isa Akaiev =

Ukrainian Crimean Tatar activist and soldier

Isa Akayev
- Native name: Іса Акаєв
- Born: Nariman Narketovych Bilialov; Uzbekistan
- Allegiance: Ukraine
- Branch: Main Directorate of Intelligence
- Rank: Junior sergeant
- Commands: Krym Battalion
- Conflicts: Russo-Ukrainian War; War in Donbas; Battle of Mariupol; Battle in Shakhtarsk Raion; Russian invasion of Ukraine; Northern Ukraine campaign; Battle of Bakhmut
- Awards: Order of Merit

Nariman Narketovych Bilialov (Ukrainian: Наріман Наркетович Білялов), better known as Isa Akaiev (Ukrainian: Іса Акаєв), is a Ukrainian Crimean Tatar civic activist and junior sergeant of the Main Directorate of Intelligence.

== Biography ==
In 1944, his grandparents and parents were deported from Crimea to Uzbekistan, where he was born and trained as a civil engineer. In the early 1990s, they returned to their family homeland.

Akaiev participated in the Euromaidan protests.

In 2014, after the Russian takeover of Crimea, he left the peninsula and volunteered for the Dnipro-1 Battalion. With no combat experience, he founded and led the Krym Battalion, with which he defended Mariupol and participated in the battles for Savur-Mohyla. He was later demobilized. He helped his compatriots in mainland Ukraine. He was engaged in the popularization of Crimean Tatar traditions in Vinnytsia Oblast.

Since 2021, he has been the head of the Charitable Foundation "Krymly". Deputy Head of the public organization "Vetan" (Vinnytsia).

With the beginning of the full-scale Russian invasion of Ukraine, he returned to the front. Participated in the battles for Kyiv Oblast, Zaporizhzhia and Kherson directions and Bakhmut.

On 24 October 2022, he was put on the wanted list by the Russian administration in Crimea.

== Awards ==
- Order of Merit, III class (23 August 2021)
