= Unicorn Battalion (Ukraine) =

Informal name for LGBTQ Armed Forces of Ukraine personnel

- батальйон єдинорогів
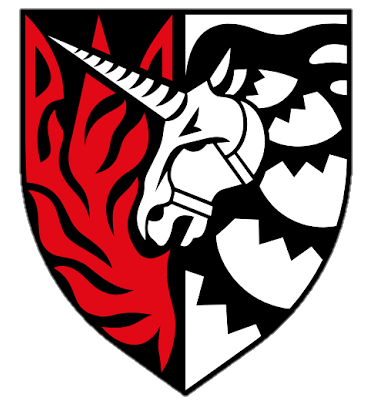
- Formation: First established in 2014
- Purpose: Insignia voluntarily worn by LGBTQ+ Ukrainian soldiers to show their identity
- Region served: Ukraine

The Unicorn Battalion (Ukrainian: батальйон єдинорогів, romanized: batalyon edynorohiv) is an informal name, adopted by LGBTQ+ personnel serving in the Armed Forces of Ukraine, characterized by their "unicorn" insignia. It is not a formal battalion, but is colloquially referred to as such, despite being a dispersed collection of personnel working in different military units.

== History ==
Starting in 2014, following the annexation of Crimea by the Russian Federation, some LGBTQ+ soldiers in the Ukrainian Armed Forces started wearing unicorn patches, signalling their identity. The unicorn was chosen because it is a mythical creature that does not exist, a reference to myths that there are no LGBTQ+ personnel in the Ukrainian military. LGBTQ+ soldiers in the International Legion have also adopted the patch. Variants of the unicorn insignia featuring different pride flags have also been seen in use.

LGBTQ personnel and organizations have worked with traditionally conservative organizations such as the Azov Regiment. Despite the progress in attitudes, some Ukrainian LGBTQ+ personnel still face homophobic attacks and several drawbacks due to the lack of legal recognition of gay marriage, meaning the partners of deceased personnel do not receive state benefits. In early 2025, a battalion commander was demoted over discriminating against non-binary and LGBTQ personnel and prohibiting them from wearing the "unicorn" insignia.
