= Battle of Krasnyi Lyman =

2014 battle of the War in Donbas

- Part of the War in Donbas
Date	3–19 June 2014
Location	Lyman, Donetsk Oblast, Ukraine (and surrounding villages)
Result	Ukrainian victory: The Ukrainian Armed Forces recaptured Krasnyi Lyman from the Donetsk People’s Republic forces

Belligerents
Ukraine	Donetsk People's Republic

Units involved
Armed Forces of Ukraine; 79th Air Assault Brigade; 25th Airborne Brigade; 24th Mechanized Brigade; Ministry of Internal Affairs of Ukraine; Security Service of Ukraine	/ Pro-Russian militants

Strength
Unknown	Unknown

Casualties and losses
16 killed	200 killed and wounded

The battle of Krasnyi Lyman was a series of battles in 2014 for control of the city of Krasnyi Lyman (now Lyman) in Donetsk Oblast during the War in Donbas. As a result of the battle, Ukrainian forces could reestablish control over the city and advance to the eastern outskirts of Sloviansk.

== Background ==
On April 12, 2014, on the 5th day after the proclamation of the Donetsk People's Republic, the Russian-backed separatists seized the city police department of Krasnyi Lyman (simultaneously with the seizure of the SBU and police buildings in Sloviansk). The initiative was taken by the mayor Leonid Perebyinis in the negotiation process. During negotiations with an armed and aggressive crowd of Russian militants, it was agreed that the separatists would leave the city.

Acting Interior Minister Arsen Avakov said that in Krasnyi Lyman, the attack of Russian militants with short-barreled assault rifles of Russian production of the AK-100 series was repulsed by police forces and city soldiers. People became human shields in defense of the police department from separatists who came from Sloviansk. According to Avakov, the AK-100 with underbarrel grenade launchers is only in service with the Armed Forces of the Russian Federation.

However, on April 30, almost 40 armed separatists broke into the session of the city council, taking deputies and the community hostage, forced the city leadership to include in the vote the issue of recognizing the independence of the Donetsk People's Republic. The occupants set up roadblocks at the entrance to the city.

On May 8, 2014, in the Hrekivskyi forest in the Luhansk Oblast, the body of the head of the Krasnolyman branch of the All-Ukrainian Society "Prosvita" named after Taras Shevchenko Valeriy Sal o was found, which pro-Russian militants belonging to the Donetsk People's Republic had stolen the day before in the center of the village of Shandrihove, Krasnolyman district.

== Main events ==
On May 11, 2014, according to acting Head of the Presidential Administration of Ukraine Serhiy Pashynskyi, the anti-terrorist operation in the area of the cities of Krasnyi Lyman, Sloviansk and Kramatorsk in the Donetsk Oblast moved to the final stage.

On June 3, the anti-terrorist operation forces went on the offensive, demanding the preparation of weapons. At the same time, civilians were warned about the beginning of hostilities by scattering special leaflets with guns. By mid-afternoon, the southern and central parts of the town were cleared. In the evening, acting President of Ukraine Oleksandr Turchynov said that the Ukrainian authorities had regained control over Krasnyi Lyman.

During June 3–4, the Security Service of Ukraine and the Ministry of Internal Affairs of Ukraine conducted a special operation to detain pro-Russian criminals in the city of Krasnyi Lyman, during which the militants' stronghold seized in mid-April was liquidated. One person died as a result of the operation. On June 5, the work of the city council and the city police department was resumed.

After successful actions by the 79th Air Assault Brigade on the eastern outskirst of the city, on 4 June 2014 troops of the 25th Airborne Brigade attacked a roadblock of the militants located to Lysychansk. Simultaneously, forces of the 24th Mechanized Brigade advanced from the north. The sweep of the city lasted on June 4 and 5, the detection of militants was carried out with searches of houses and citizens. The separatists and their accomplices were detained, and local residents assisted in their detection.

On June 5, the Ukrainian flag was raised again over the city council and the city police department of Krasnyi Lyman. Patrolling and service in the city was started by the Special Unit of the Ministry of Internal Affairs "Artemivsk" together with a consolidated police detachment and local officers loyal to the oath of Ukraine. The city began clear armed groups. On the same day, according to the Decree of the President of Ukraine No. 498/2014 "On Measures to Form the Krasnolymansky District State Administration of Donetsk region", Konstiantyn Volodymyrovych Mateichenko was appointed head of the Krasnolymansk District State Administration, Lieutenant Colonel, a native of Kostiantynivka.

=== Battle of June 19 ===
According to the pro-Russian side, up to 180–200 people from the Flag battalion occupied the positions on the part of pro-Russian militants, had two mortars, BRDM, three heavy machine guns (one KPVT and two NSVs), two LNG-9 easel grenade launchers, and two AGS automatic grenade launchers.

==== Course ====
The Russian command represented by Igor Girkin did not expect a major strike in the Yampil direction, waiting for it in Semenivka or Mykolaivka, which would lead to the rapid cutting off of Sloviansk.

Russian kazaki of the Don Army, defending the bridge, withdrew after the beginning of the battle, without resisting.

The first attack was repelled by the militants. After its end, they were able to tow one of the three destroyed BMD-1s, which was then handed over to the formations of the battalion "Prizrak". After this attack Girkin in the area of Yampil and Zakitne was sent machine gun-anti-tank platoon under the command of "Motorola", but he could not provide a significant contribution, and was scattered by Ukrainian troops, because they had already crossed the bridge and became entrenched on the southern shore.

On that day, Ukrainian intelligence officers received the order to enter the area of accumulation of militants and pre-emptive strikes to neutralize them. After several kilometers of traffic, near the village of Kryva Luka, paratroopers were ambushed—they were opened fire from small arms, grenade launchers, mortars. The scouts used smoke grenades, took up combat positions suitable for defense, and after several hours of fierce battle, help arrived. After the battle, the fighters counted several dozen enemy corpses, the fighter Lesha and the commander of the reconnaissance group were killed.

==== Outcome ====
As a result of the battle, forces of the 25th Brigade with support of two Su-25 aircraft established control over an important outpost of the militants near the village of Dibrova, leading to serious personnel losses among the enemy.

The fortifications of Russian militants were destroyed in the southern part of the Krasnolymansky district (in the cities of Siversk, Yampil and Zarichne, the village of Zakitne and the remnants in the city of Krasnyi Lyman). During the roundup, some of the separatists were detained and prosecuted. However, most Russian militants relocated to the city of Sloviansk.

As a result of the operation on June 19, 16 servicemen of the 24th Mechanized, 25th Airborne and 95th Air Assault Brigades of the Armed Forces of Ukraine were killed.

Vlasenko Yuriy Oleksandrovych	soldier	on June 3, 2014	79 UAED	Died during an ambush.
Lyashenko Ihor Viktorovych	lieutenant colonel	on June 19, 2014	24 OMB	Died in the battles for Yampil.
Vorobey Stepan Stepanovych	captain	on June 19, 2014	24 OMB	Died in the battles for Yampil.
Kravchuk Volodymyr Sergiyovych	lieutenant	on June 19, 2014	"Leopard"	Died in battle for Yampil.
Povstyuk Andriy Oleksiyovych	senior sergeant	on June 19, 2014	24 OMB	Died in the battles for Yampil.
Parish Yuriy Stepanovych	senior soldier	June 19, 2014	24 OMB	Died in the battles for Yampil.
Sivak Victor Olexandrovych	the soldier	on June 19, 2014	24 OMB	Died in the battles for Yampil.
Semchuk Victor Yaroslavovich	soldier	on June 19, 2014	24 OMB	Died in the battles for Yampil.
Shainoga Mykola Romanovych	a soldier	on June 19, 2014	24 OMB	Died in the battles for Yampil.
Klochko Andriy Viktorovych	captain	on June 19, 2014	25 OPDB	Died in the battles for Yampil.
Golopolosov Yuriy Oleksiyovych	Senior Ensign	June 19, 2014	25 OPDB	Died in the battles for Yampil.
Lyushenko Mykola Mykolayovych	Ensign	June 19, 2014	25 OPDB	Died in the battles for Yampil.
Koval Maxym Alexandrovych	Senior Sergeant	June 19, 2014	25 OPDB	Died in the battles for Yampil.
Mospan Vitaliy Oleksiyovych	Junior Sergeant	on June 19, 2014	25 OPDB	Died in the battles for Yampil.
Litvinenko Andriy Olexandrovych	the soldier	on June 19, 2014	25 OPDB	Died in the battles for Yampil.
Kremenar Oleksiy Volodymyrovych	Captain	on June 19, 2014	95 OAEMB	Died in the battles for Yampil.
Shevchenko Olexiy Volodymyrovych	the senior soldier	on June 19, 2014	95 OAEMB	Died in the battles for Yampil.
Kiselyov Ihor Olexandrovych	Major	on June 30, 2014	10 OZSpP GUR	He was mortally wounded by a sniper in an ambush near Kryva Luka.

== See also ==
- Outline of the Russo-Ukrainian War
