= List of rural localities in Belgorod Oblast =

Map of Russia with Belgorod Oblast highlighted

This is a list of rural localities in Belgorod Oblast. Belgorod Oblast (Russian: Белгоро́дская о́бласть, Belgorodskaya oblast) is a federal subject of Russia (an oblast). Its administrative center is the city of Belgorod. Population: 1,532,526 (2010 Census results).

== Alexeyevsky District ==
Rural localities in Alexeyevsky District

- Afanasyevka
- Alexeyenkovo
- Aleynikovo
- Babichev
- Batlukov
- Belozorovo
- Berezhnoy
- Beryozki
- Blizhneye Chesnochnoye
- Bozhkovo
- Bublikovo
- Cherepov
- Chuprinino
- Dalneye Chesnochnoye
- Dudchin
- Garbuzovo
- Gerashchenkovo
- Gezov
- Glukhovka
- Golubinsky
- Gorodishche
- Grechanikov
- Ignatov
- Ilovka
- Ilyinka
- Ivashchenko
- Kalitva
- Kamyshevatoye
- Khlevishche
- Khmyzovka
- Khreshchyaty
- Kirichenkov
- Klimov
- Koltunovka
- Kopanets
- Kovalevo
- Krasnoye
- Kuleshov
- Kupriyanov
- Kushchino
- Lesikovka
- Lutsenkovo
- Matryono-Gezovo
- Menyaylovo
- Mikhouderovka
- Nadezhdovka
- Nemenushchy
- Nikolayevka
- Nikolayevka
- Novosyolovka
- Orlov
- Osadcheye
- Osmakov
- Papushin
- Pirogovo
- Podseredneye
- Pokladov
- Popov
- Pyshnograyev
- Redkodub
- Repenka
- Reznikov
- Rybalkin
- Seroshtanov
- Shaporevo
- Shaposhnikov
- Shcherbakovo
- Shelushin
- Shkuropatov
- Sidorkin
- Slavgorodskoye
- Solomakhin
- Sovetskoye
- Stanichnoye
- Studeny Kolodets
- Syrovatsky
- Tarakanov
- Teplinka
- Tyutyunikovo
- Varvarovka
- Vasilchenkov
- Vlasov
- Vorobyovo
- Zapolnoye
- Zhukovo
- Zvarykino

== Belgorodsky District ==
Rural localities in Belgorodsky District:

- Belomestnoye
- Belovskoye
- Blizhnyaya Igumenka
- Dolbino
- Dubovoye
- Golovino
- Karnaukhovka
- Khokhlovo
- Komsomolsky
- Krasny Khutor
- Krasny Oktyabr
- Malinovka
- Maysky
- Myasoyedovo
- Nekhoteyevka
- Nikolskoye
- Nizhny Olshanets
- Novosadovy
- Petrovka
- Pushkarnoye
- Repnoye
- Shchetinovka
- Solokhi
- Solomino
- Streletskoye
- Tavrovo
- Tolokonnoye
- Ugrim
- Vesyolaya Lopan
- Yasnye Zori
- Yerik
- Zelyonaya Polyana
- Zhuravlyovka

== Borisovsky District ==
Rural localities in Borisovsky District:

- Akulinovka
- Baytsury
- Belenkoye
- Berezovka
- Gruzskoye
- Khotmyzhsk
- Krasny Kutok
- Kryukovo
- Oktyabrskaya Gotnya
- Striguny

== Chernyansky District ==
Rural localities in Chernyansky District:

- Kochegury
- Krasny Ostrov
- Krasny Vyselok
- Novorechye
- Ogibnoye
- Okuni
- Olshanka
- Russkaya Khalan
- Volokonovka
- Zakharovo

== Grayvoronsky District ==
Rural localities in Grayvoronsky District:

- Bezymeno
- Chapayevsky
- Dobroivanovka
- Dobropolye
- Dorogoshch
- Dronovka
- Dunayka
- Golovchino
- Gora-Podol
- Gorkovsky
- Ivanovskaya Lisitsa
- Khotmyzhsk
- Kozinka
- Mokraya Orlovka
- Novostroyevka-Pervaya
- Pokachevo
- Smorodino
- Sovkhozny

== Gubkinsky District ==
Rural localities in Gubkinsky District:

- Bobrovy Dvory
- Istobnoye
- Ivanovka
- Kochki
- Morozovo
- Nikanorovka
- Ryabinovka
- Skorodnoye
- Tolstoye
- Troitsky
- Yuryevka
- Zagorny
- Zapovedny
- Zaytsevo

== Ivnyansky District ==
Rural localities in Ivnyansky District:

- Kirovsky
- Kurasovka
- Verkhopenye

== Korochansky District ==
Rural localities in Korochansky District:

- Afanasovo
- Alexeyevka
- Annovka
- Bekhteyevo
- Bolshaya Khalan
- Bubnovo
- Foshchevatoye
- Kazanka
- Klinovets
- Korotkoye
- Koshcheyevo
- Lomovo
- Melikhovo
- Michurinsky
- Nechayevo
- Novaya Slobodka
- Ploskoye
- Plotavets
- Pogorelovka
- Popovka
- Prokhodnoye
- Sheino
- Shlyakhovo
- Sokolovka
- Ternovoye
- Ushakovo
- Yablonovo
- Zayachye
- Zhigaylovka

== Krasnensky District ==
Rural localities in Krasnensky District:

- Kalinin
- Krasnoye
- Lesnoye Ukolovo
- Novosoldatka
- Svistovka
- Verbnoye

== Krasnogvardeysky District ==
Rural localities in Krasnogvardeysky District

- Arnautovo
- Biryuch
- Foshchevaty
- Gorovoye
- Gredyakino
- Kalinovo
- Kolomytsevo
- Livenka
- Maryevka
- Nikitovka
- Nizhnyaya Pokrovka
- Novokhutornoye
- Palatovo
- Podgorskoye
- Razdornoye
- Repenka
- Sadki
- Streletskoye
- Utochka
- Valuy
- Valuychik
- Verkhnyaya Pokrovka
- Verkhososna
- Vesyoloye
- Zasosna

== Krasnoyaruzhsky District ==
Rural localities in Krasnoyaruzhsky District:

- Bytsenkov
- Dubino
- Grafovka
- Ilek-Penkovka
- Kolotilovka
- Prilesye
- Repyakhovka
- Sergiyevka
- Terebreno
- Vyazovoye
- Zadorozhny

== Novooskolsky District ==
Rural localities in Novooskolsky District:

- Belomestnoye
- Golubino
- Kositsino
- Mospanov
- Nemtsevo
- Polevoy
- Pribrezhny
- Rudny
- Sharapovka
- Staraya Bezginka
- Trostenets
- Yarskoye

== Prokhorovsky District ==
Rural localities in Prokhorovsky District:

- Andreyevka
- Belenikhino
- Beregovoye-Pervoye
- Bolshoye
- Donets
- Gnezdilovka
- Gryaznoye
- Kartashyovka
- Kazachye
- Kholodnoye
- Kolomytsevo
- Kondrovka
- Krasnoye
- Krivosheyevka
- Krivye Balki
- Luchki
- Maloyablonovo
- Malye Mayachki
- Maslovka
- Niva
- Pereleski
- Petrovka
- Plota
- Plyushchiny
- Podolkhi
- Podyarugi
- Prelestnoye
- Prigorki
- Priznachnoye
- Radkovka
- Rzhavets
- Sagaydachnoye
- Seymitsa
- Shakhovo
- Studyony
- Suvorovo
- Teterevino
- Vesyoly
- Vyazovoye
- Zarnitsy
- Zhuravka-Pervaya

== Rakityansky District ==
Rural localities in Rakityansky District:

- Bobrava
- Chistopolye
- Dmitriyevka
- Dontsov
- Ilyok-Koshary
- Nizhniye Peny
- Novozinaidinskoye
- Soldatskoye
- Sumovsky
- Svyatoslavka
- Trefilovka
- Tsentralnoye
- Vengerovka
- Vvedenskaya Gotnya
- Vvedensky
- Vyshniye Peny
- Zinaidino

== Rovensky District ==
Rural localities in Rovensky District

- Aydar
- Kharkovskoye
- Ladomirovka
- Loznaya
- Lozovoye
- Nagolnoye
- Nagorye
- Novoalexandrovka
- Rzhevka
- Svistovka
- Verkhnyaya Serebryanka

== Shebekinsky District ==
Rural localities in Shebekinsky District:

- Alexandrovka
- Arkhangelskoye
- Babenkov
- Bely Kolodez
- Belyanka
- Bershakovo
- Bezlyudovka
- Bolshetroitskoye
- Bolshoye Gorodishche
- Bulanovka
- Churayevo
- Dmitriyevka
- Dubovenka
- Grafovka
- Gremyachy
- Koshlakovo
- Kozmodemyanovka
- Krapivnoye
- Kupino
- Malomikhaylovka
- Maximovka
- Meshkovoye
- Murom
- Nezhegol
- Novaya Tavolzhanka
- Novaya Zarya
- Ognishchevo
- Pervoye Tseplyayevo
- Popovka
- Rzhevka
- Strelitsa-Pervaya
- Surkovo
- Verkhneye Beryozovo
- Voznesenovka
- Zhelobok
- Ziborovka
- Zimovnoye

== Starooskolsky District ==
Rural localities in Starooskolsky District:

- Anpilovka
- Arkhangelskoye
- Babanika
- Bocharovka
- Borovaya
- Chernikovo
- Chumaki
- Chuzhikovo
- Dmitriyevka
- Dolgaya Polyana
- Fedoseyevka
- Glushkovka
- Golofeyevka
- Gorodishche
- Gotovye
- Grinevka
- Ignatovka
- Ilyiny
- Ivanovka
- Kaplino
- Kazachok
- Khoroshilovo
- Kotenevka
- Kotovo
- Krutoye
- Kurskoye
- Lapygino
- Lipyagi
- Logvinovka
- Luganka
- Maly Prisynok
- Menzhulyuk
- Monakovo
- Nabokino
- Nagolnoye
- Neznamovo
- Nikolayevka (Kazachanskoye Rural Settlement)
- Nikolayevka (Peschanskoye Rural Settlement)
- Nizhne-Chufichevo
- Nizhneatamanskoye
- Novaya Derevnya
- Novikovo
- Novoalexandrovka
- Novokladovoye
- Novonikolayevka
- Novosyolovka
- Obukhovka
- Okolnoye
- Ozerki
- Pasechny
- Peschanka
- Pesochny
- Petrovsky
- Plota
- Potudan
- Preobrazhenka
- Priolskoye
- Prokudino
- Rekunovka
- Rogovatoye
- Sergeyevka
- Shatalovka
- Shmarnoye
- Soldatskoye
- Sorokino
- Sumarokov
- Terekhovo
- Ternovoye
- Veliky Perevoz
- Verkhne-Chufichevoe
- Vladimirvoka
- Vorotnikovo
- Vypolzovo
- Vysoky
- Zmeyevka
- Znamenka

== Valuysky District ==
Rural localities in Valuysky District:

- Agoshevka
- Basovo
- Biryuch
- Borki
- Dalny
- Dronovo
- Druzhba
- Dvuluchnoye
- Filippovo
- Gerasimovka
- Kazinka
- Khmelevets
- Khokhlovo
- Khrapovo
- Koloskovo
- Kolykhalino
- Kukuyevka
- Luchka
- Mandrovo
- Maslovka
- Mayskoye
- Nasonovo
- Novokazatskoye
- Orekhovo
- Ovchinnikovo
- Printsevka
- Pristen
- Romashovka
- Roshchino
- Rovnoye
- Rozhdestveno
- Selivanovo
- Shelayevo
- Shushpanovo
- Soloti
- Staraya Simonovka
- Terekhovo
- Timonovo
- Uglovo
- Urayevo
- Vatunino
- Verkhny Moisey
- Yablonovo

== Veydelevsky District ==
Rural localities in Veydelevsky District:

- Bankino
- Bely Kolodez
- Bolshiye Lipyagi
- Dolgoye
- Klimenki
- Kubraki
- Malakeyevo
- Nekhayevka
- Nikolayevka
- Opytny
- Pogrebitsky
- Pridorozhny
- Solontsy
- Viktoropol
- Volchy
- Zakutskoye
- Zenino

== Volokonovsky District ==
Rural localities in Volokonovsky District:

- Abalmasov
- Afonyevka
- Alexandrovka
- Alexeyevka
- Bochanka
- Borisovka
- Chapelnoye
- Davydkin
- Foshchevatovo
- Gayevka
- Golofeyevka
- Grigoryevka
- Grushevka
- Khutorishche
- Kiselev
- Konovalovo
- Korovino
- Kozlovka
- Krasivy
- Krasnaya Niva
- Krasnoye Gorodishche
- Krasny Pakhar
- Krinichnoye
- Lazurnoye
- Lutovinovo
- Malinovo
- Nina
- Nizhniye Lubyanki
- Novaya Dolina
- Novoalexandrovka
- Novodevichy
- Novoivanovka
- Novorozhdestvenka
- Novoye
- Novy
- Odintsov
- Oleynitsky
- Olkhov
- Orlinoye
- Oskolishche
- Otradnoye
- Pervomaysky
- Ploskoye
- Plotovka
- Plotva
- Plotvyanka
- Pogromets
- Pokrovka
- Pytochny
- Ray
- Repyevka
- Shakhovka
- Shchepkin
- Shenshinovka
- Shidlovka
- Sredniye Lubyanki
- Staroivanovka
- Staroseltsevo
- Stary
- Stolbishche
- Tishanka
- Tolmachyov
- Ulyanovka
- Uspenka
- Verkhniye Lubyanki
- Verneyablonovo
- Verny
- Vetchininovo
- Vladimirovka
- Volchy-Pervy
- Volchy-Vtoroy
- Volchya Alexandrovka
- Yekaterinovka
- Yevdokimov
- Yutanovka
- Zelyony Klin

== Yakovlevsky District ==
Rural localities in Yakovlevsky District:

- Alexeyevka
- Butovo
- Bykovka
- Dmitriyevka
- Gostishchevo
- Kazatskoye
- Krivtsovo
- Kustovoye
- Moshchenoye
- Sazhnoye
- Smorodino
- Streletskoye
- Ternovka
- Verkhny Olshanets
- Zavidovka

== See also ==
- Lists of rural localities in Russia
