= Logvinovka =

Logvinovka Логвиновка
- Settlement
- Location within Belgorod Oblast Location within Russia
- Coordinates: 51°15′N 38°15′E
- Country: Russia
- Region: Belgorod Oblast
- District: Starooskolsky District
- Time zone: UTC+3:00

Logvinovka (Russian: Логвиновка) is a rural locality (a settlement) in Starooskolsky District, Belgorod Oblast, Russia. The population was 24 as of 2010. There is 1 street.

== Geography ==
Logvinovka is located 36 km east of Stary Oskol (the district's administrative centre) by road. Potudan is the nearest rural locality.
