= Mandrovo =

Mandrovo Мандрово
- Selo
- Location within Belgorod Oblast Location within Russia
- Coordinates: 50°17′N 38°15′E
- Country: Russia
- Region: Belgorod Oblast
- District: Valuysky District
- Time zone: UTC+3:00

Mandrovo (Russian: Мандрово) is a rural locality (a selo) and the administrative center of Mandrovskoye Rural Settlement, Valuysky District, Belgorod Oblast, Russia. The population was 977 as of 2010. There are 15 streets.

== Geography ==
Mandrovo is located 20 km northeast of Valuyki (the district's administrative centre) by road. Voronovka is the nearest rural locality.
