= Kalinovo, Belgorod Oblast =

Kalinovo Калиново
- Selo
- Location within Belgorod Oblast Location within Russia
- Coordinates: 50°29′N 38°25′E
- Country: Russia
- Region: Belgorod Oblast
- District: Krasnogvardeysky District
- Time zone: UTC+3:00

Kalinovo (Russian: Калиново) is a rural locality (a selo) and the administrative center of Kalinovskoye Rural Settlement, Krasnogvardeysky District, Belgorod Oblast, Russia. The population was 563 as of 2010. There are 6 streets.

== Geography ==
Kalinovo is located 22 km (14 mi) south of Biryuch (the district's administrative centre) by road. Popasnoye is the nearest rural locality.
