= Bykovka, Belgorod Oblast =

Bykovka Быковка
- Selo
- Location within Belgorod Oblast Location within Russia
- Coordinates: 50°48′N 36°25′E
- Country: Russia
- Region: Belgorod Oblast
- District: Yakovlevsky District
- Time zone: UTC+3:00

Bykovka (Russian: Быковка) is a rural locality (a selo) and the administrative center of Bykovskoye Rural Settlement, Yakovlevsky District, Belgorod Oblast, Russia. The population was 963 as of 2010. There are 13 streets.

== Geography ==
Bykovka is located 6 km northwest of Stroitel (the district's administrative centre) by road. Kondarevo is the nearest rural locality.
