= Neznamovo =

Neznamovo Незнамово
- Selo
- Location within Belgorod Oblast Location within Russia
- Coordinates: 51°15′N 37°55′E
- Country: Russia
- Region: Belgorod Oblast
- District: Starooskolsky District
- Time zone: UTC+3:00

Neznamovo (Russian: Незнамово) is a rural locality (a selo) and the administrative center of Neznamovskoye Rural Settlement, Starooskolsky District, Belgorod Oblast, Russia. The population was 1,430 as of 2010. There are 9 streets.

== Geography ==
Neznamovo is located 11 km southeast of Stary Oskol (the district's administrative centre) by road. Anpilovka is the nearest rural locality.
