= Chapayevsky =

Chapayevsky Чапаевский
- Settlement
- Location within Belgorod Oblast Location within Russia
- Coordinates: 50°30′N 35°49′E
- Country: Russia
- Region: Belgorod Oblast
- District: Grayvoronsky District
- Time zone: UTC+3:00

Chapayevsky (Russian: Чапаевский) is a rural locality (a settlement) in Grayvoronsky District, Belgorod Oblast, Russia. The population was 377 as of 2010. There are 5 streets.

== Geography ==
Chapayevsky is located 19 km east of Grayvoron (the district's administrative centre) by road. Khotmyzhsk is the nearest rural locality.
