= Russkaya Khalan =

Russkaya Khalan Русская Халань
- Selo
- Location within Belgorod Oblast Location within Russia
- Coordinates: 50°56′34″N 37°43′42″E
- Country: Russia
- Region: Belgorod Oblast
- District: Chernyansky District
- Time zone: UTC+3:00

Russkaya Khalan (Russian: Русская Халань) is a rural locality (a selo) and the administrative center of Russko-Khalanskoye Rural Settlement, Chernyansky District, Belgorod Oblast, Russia. The population was 1,033 as of 2010. There are 22 streets.

== Geography ==
Russkaya Khalan is located 9 km west of Chernyanka (the district's administrative centre) by road. Krasny Ostrov is the nearest rural locality.
