= Krasivy =

Krasivy Красивый
- Settlement
- Location within Belgorod Oblast Location within Russia
- Coordinates: 50°34′N 37°44′E
- Country: Russia
- Region: Belgorod Oblast
- District: Volokonovsky District
- Time zone: UTC+3:00

Krasivy (Russian: Красивый) is a rural locality (a settlement) in Volokonovsky District, Belgorod Oblast, Russia. The population was 19 as of 2010. There is 1 street.

== Geography ==
Krasivy is located 18 km north of Volokonovka (the district's administrative centre) by road. Afonyevka is the nearest rural locality.
