= Kazatskoye =

Kazatskoye Казацкое
- Selo
- Location within Belgorod Oblast Location within Russia
- Coordinates: 50°44′N 36°14′E
- Country: Russia
- Region: Belgorod Oblast
- District: Yakovlevsky District
- Time zone: UTC+3:00

Kazatskoye (Russian: Казацкое) is a rural locality (a selo) and the administrative center of the Kazatskoye Rural Settlement, Yakovlevsky District, Belgorod Oblast, Russia. The population was 595 as of 2010. There are 15 streets.

== Geography ==
Kazatskoye is located 28 km southwest of Stroitel (the district's administrative centre) by road. Krasnoye Podgoroneye is the nearest rural locality.
