= Luganka, Belgorod Oblast =

Luganka Луганка
- Selo
- Location within Belgorod Oblast Location within Russia
- Coordinates: 51°07′N 38°18′E
- Country: Russia
- Region: Belgorod Oblast
- District: Starooskolsky District
- Time zone: UTC+3:00

Luganka (Russian: Луганка) is a rural locality (a selo) in Starooskolsky District, Belgorod Oblast, Russia. The population was 252 as of 2010. There is 1 street.

== Geography ==
Luganka is located 50 km southeast of Stary Oskol (the district's administrative centre) by road. Borovaya is the nearest rural locality.
