= Novosadovy =

Novosadovy Новосадовый
- Settlement
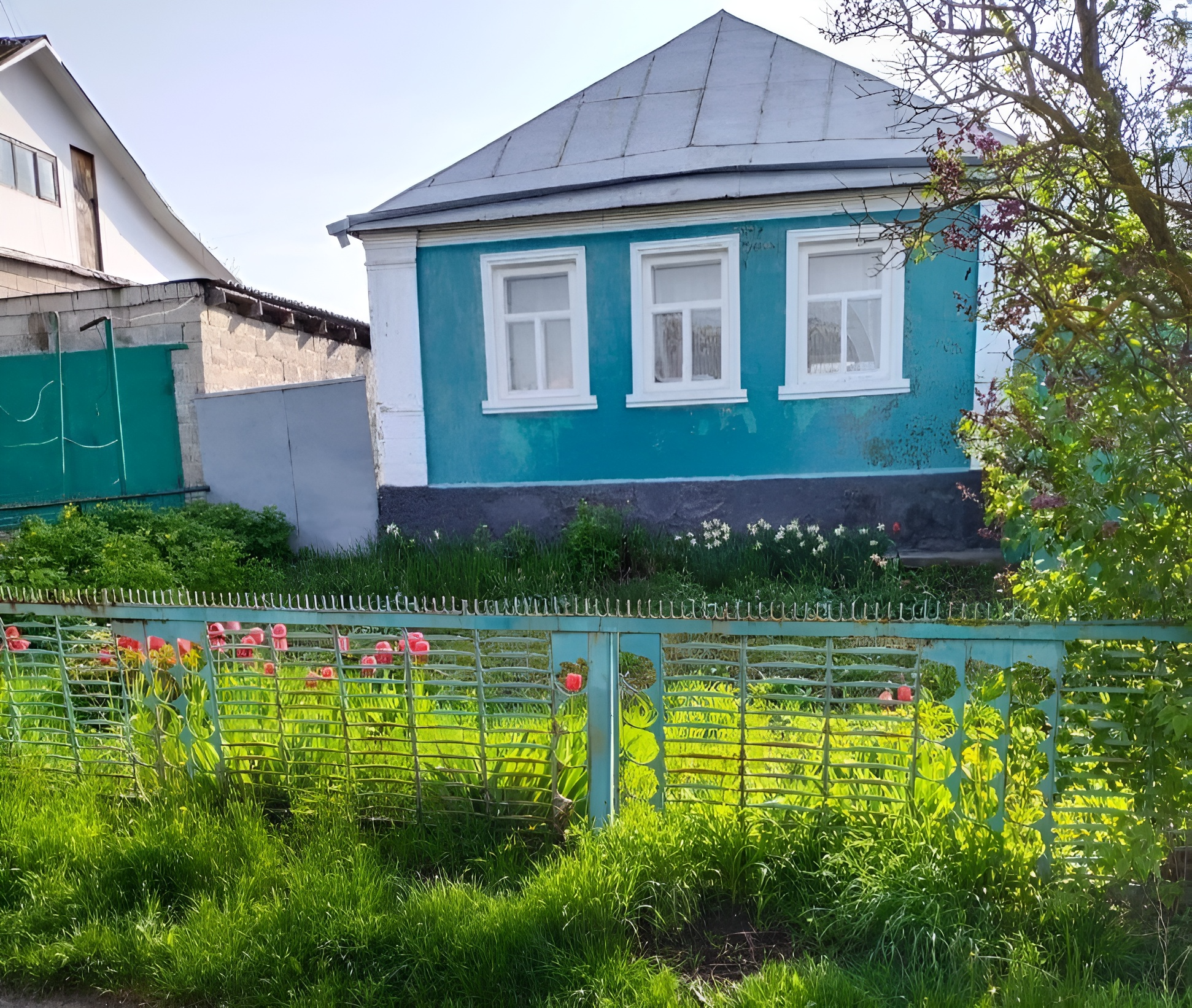

- Location within Belgorod Oblast Location within Russia
- Coordinates: 50°38′N 36°40′E
- Country: Russia
- Region: Belgorod Oblast
- District: Belgorodsky District
- Time zone: UTC+3:00

Novosadovy (Russian: Новосадовый) is a rural locality (a settlement) and the administrative center of Novosadovsky Rural Settlement, Belgorodsky District, Belgorod Oblast, Russia. Population: 7,833 (2021 census); 1,994 (2010 census). There are 128 streets.

== Geography ==
Novosadovy is located 27 km northeast of Maysky (the district's administrative centre) by road. Stary Gorod is the nearest rural locality.
