= Zvarykino =

Zvarykino Зварыкино
- Selo
- Location within Belgorod Oblast Location within Russia
- Coordinates: 50°26′N 38°32′E
- Country: Russia
- Region: Belgorod Oblast
- District: Alexeyevsky District
- Time zone: UTC+3:00

Zvarykino (Russian: Зварыкино) is a rural locality (a selo) in Alexeyevsky District, Belgorod Oblast, Russia. The population was 36 as of 2010. There are 3 streets.

== Geography ==
Zvarykino is located 28 km southwest of Alexeyevka (the district's administrative centre) by road. Khreshchaty is the nearest rural locality.
