= Lesikovka =

Lesikovka Лесиковка
- Settlement
- Location within Belgorod Oblast Location within Russia
- Coordinates: 50°19′N 39°02′E
- Country: Russia
- Region: Belgorod Oblast
- District: Alexeyevsky District
- Time zone: UTC+3:00

Lesikovka (Russian: Лесиковка) is a rural locality (a settlement) in Alexeyevsky District, Belgorod Oblast, Russia. The population was 28 as of 2010. There is 1 street.

== Geography ==
Lesikovka is located 51 km southeast of Alexeyevka (the district's administrative centre) by road. Sovetskoye is the nearest rural locality.
