= Novokazatskoye =

Novokazatskoye Новоказацкое
- Selo
- Location within Belgorod Oblast Location within Russia
- Coordinates: 50°12′N 38°09′E
- Country: Russia
- Region: Belgorod Oblast
- District: Valuysky District
- Time zone: UTC+3:00

Novokazatskoye (Russian: Новоказацкое) is a rural locality (a selo) in Valuysky District, Belgorod Oblast, Russia. The population was 371 as of 2010. There are 4 streets.

== Geography ==
Novokazatskoye is located 4 km east of Valuyki (the district's administrative centre) by road. Luchka is the nearest rural locality.
