= Mikhouderovka =

Mikhouderovka Мухоудеровка
- Selo
- Location within Belgorod Oblast Location within Russia
- Coordinates: 50°40′N 38°52′E
- Country: Russia
- Region: Belgorod Oblast
- District: Alexeyevsky District
- Time zone: UTC+3:00

Mikhouderovka (Russian: Мухоудеровка) is a rural locality (a selo) and the administrative center of Mikhouderovskoye Rural Settlement, Alexeyevsky District, Belgorod Oblast, Russia. The population was 1,326 as of 2010. There are 21 streets.

== Geography ==
Mikhouderovka is located 19 km northeast of Alexeyevka (the district's administrative centre) by road. Dalneye Chesnochnoye is the nearest rural locality.
