= Vengerovka =

Vengerovka Венгеровка
- Selo
- Location within Belgorod Oblast Location within Russia
- Coordinates: 50°56′N 36°01′E
- Country: Russia
- Region: Belgorod Oblast
- District: Rakityansky District
- Time zone: UTC+3:00

Vengerovka (Russian: Венгеровка) is a rural locality (a selo) and the administrative center of Vengerovskoye Rural Settlement, Rakityansky District, Belgorod Oblast, Russia. The population was 829 as of 2010. There are 4 streets.

== Geography ==
Vengerovka is located 20 km northeast of Rakitnoye (the district's administrative centre) by road. Vyshniye Peny is the nearest rural locality.
