= Staroseltsevo =

Staroseltsevo Старосельцево
- Selo
- Location within Belgorod Oblast Location within Russia
- Coordinates: 50°25′N 37°48′E
- Country: Russia
- Region: Belgorod Oblast
- District: Volokonovsky District
- Time zone: UTC+3:00

Staroseltsevo (Russian: Старосельцево) is a rural locality (a selo) in Volokonovsky District, Belgorod Oblast, Russia. The population was 190 as of 2010. There are 2 streets.

== Geography ==
Staroseltsevo is located 13 km south of Volokonovka (the district's administrative centre) by road. Pyatnitskoye is the nearest rural locality.
