= Yutanovka =

Yutanovka Ютановка
- Selo
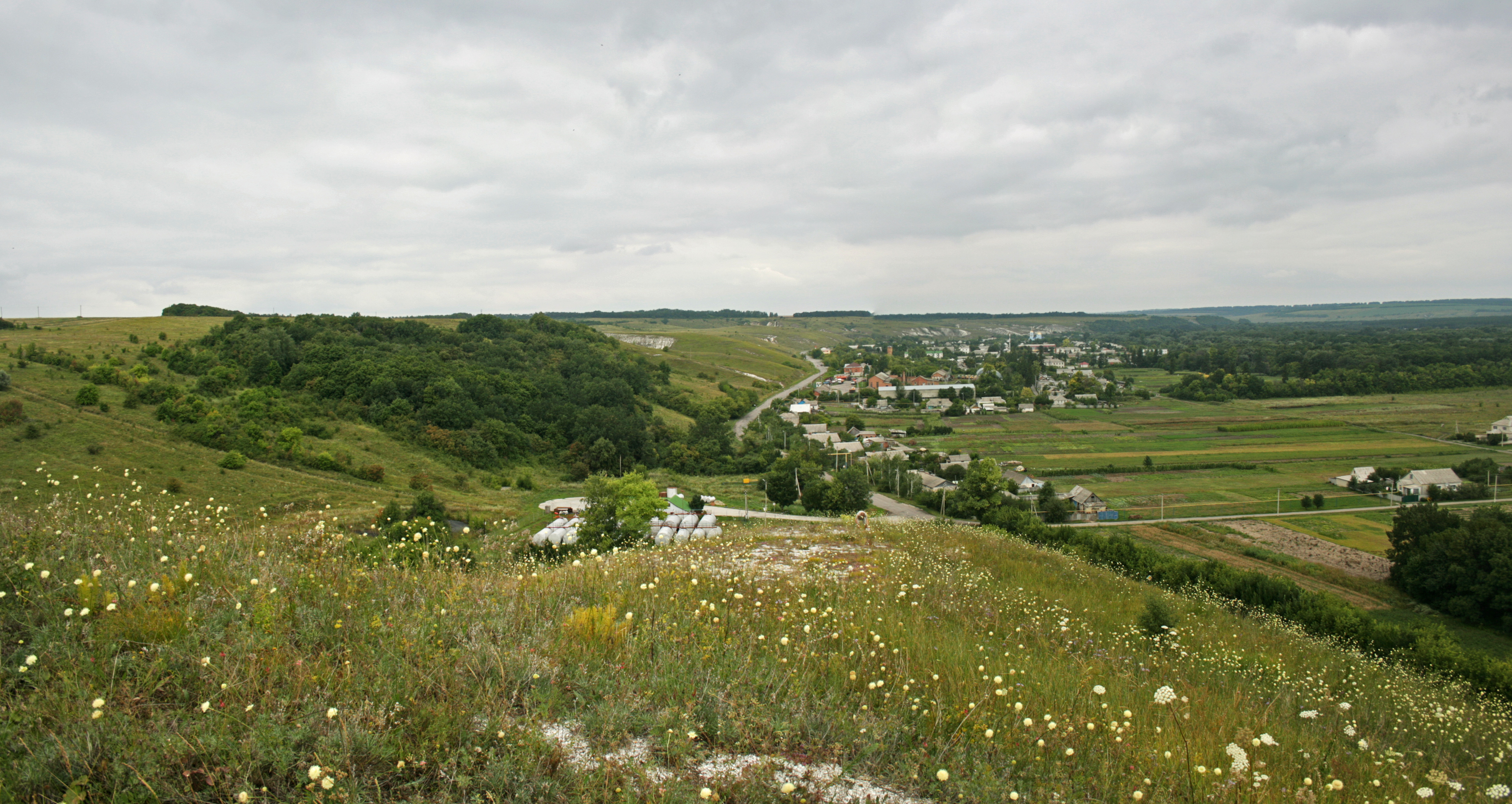

- Location within Belgorod Oblast Location within Russia
- Coordinates: 50°29′N 37°47′E
- Country: Russia
- Region: Belgorod Oblast
- District: Volokonovsky District
- Time zone: UTC+3:00

Yutanovka (Russian: Ютановка) is a rural locality (a selo) and the administrative center of Yutanovskoye Rural Settlement, Volokonovsky District, Belgorod Oblast, Russia. The population was 870 as of 2010. There are 13 streets.

== Geography ==
Yutanovka is located 8 km west of Volokonovka (the district's administrative centre) by road. Volokonovka is the nearest rural locality.
