= Dubovenka =

Dubovenka Дубовенька
- Khutor
- Location within Belgorod Oblast Location within Russia
- Coordinates: 50°35′N 37°26′E
- Country: Russia
- Region: Belgorod Oblast
- District: Shebekinsky District
- Time zone: UTC+3:00

Dubovenka (Russian: Дубовенька) is a rural locality (a khutor) in Shebekinsky District, Belgorod Oblast, Russia. The population was 14 as of 2010. There is 1 street.

== Geography ==
Dubovenka is located 59 km northeast of Shebekino (the district's administrative centre) by road. Bulanovka is the nearest rural locality.
