= Krivtsovo =

Krivtsovo Кривцово
- Selo
- Location within Belgorod Oblast Location within Russia
- Coordinates: 50°47′N 36°45′E
- Country: Russia
- Region: Belgorod Oblast
- District: Yakovlevsky District
- Time zone: UTC+3:00

Krivtsovo (Russian: Кривцово) is a rural locality (a selo) and the administrative center of Krivtsovskoye Rural Settlement, Yakovlevsky District, Belgorod Oblast, Russia. The population was 602 as of 2010. There are 16 streets.

== Geography ==
Krivtsovo is located 26 km east of Stroitel (the district's administrative centre) by road. Sazhnoye is the nearest rural locality.
