= Popov, Alexeyevsky District, Belgorod Oblast =

Popov Попов
- Khutor
- Location within Belgorod Oblast Location within Russia
- Coordinates: 50°24′N 38°32′E
- Country: Russia
- Region: Belgorod Oblast
- District: Alexeyevsky District
- Time zone: UTC+3:00

Popov (Russian: Попов) is a rural locality (a khutor) in Alexeyevsky District, Belgorod Oblast, Russia. The population was 3 as of 2010.
