= Grinevka =

Grinevka Гриневка
- Khutor
- Location within Belgorod Oblast Location within Russia
- Coordinates: 51°07′N 38°17′E
- Country: Russia
- Region: Belgorod Oblast
- District: Starooskolsky District
- Time zone: UTC+3:00

Grinevka (Russian: Гриневка) is a rural locality (a khutor) in Starooskolsky District, Belgorod Oblast, Russia. The population was 56 as of 2010. There is 1 street.

== Geography ==
Grinevka is located 49 km southeast of Stary Oskol (the district's administrative centre) by road. Shatalovka is the nearest rural locality.
