= Tyutyunikovo =

Tyutyunikovo Тютюниково
- Selo
- Location within Belgorod Oblast Location within Russia
- Coordinates: 50°30′N 39°03′E
- Country: Russia
- Region: Belgorod Oblast
- District: Alexeyevsky District
- Time zone: UTC+3:00

Tyutyunikovo (Russian: Тютюниково) is a rural locality (a selo) in Alexeyevsky District, Belgorod Oblast, Russia. The population was 297 as of 2010. There are eight streets.

== Geography ==
Tyutyunikovo is located 17 km southeast of Alexeyevka (the district's administrative centre) by road.
