= Ilyok-Koshary =

Ilyok-Koshary Илёк-Кошары
- Selo
- Location within Belgorod Oblast Location within Russia
- Coordinates: 50°54′N 35°36′E
- Country: Russia
- Region: Belgorod Oblast
- District: Rakityansky District
- Time zone: UTC+3:00

Ilyok-Koshary (Russian: Илёк-Кошары) is a rural locality (a selo) and the administrative center of Ilyok-Kosharskoye Rural Settlement, Rakityansky District, Belgorod Oblast, Russia. The population was 683 as of 2010. There are 7 streets.

== Geography ==
Ilyok-Koshary is located 20 km northwest of Rakitnoye (the district's administrative centre) by road. Barilov is the nearest rural locality.
