= Meshkovoye =

Meshkovoye Мешковое
- Selo
- Location within Belgorod Oblast Location within Russia
- Coordinates: 50°28′N 37°25′E
- Country: Russia
- Region: Belgorod Oblast
- District: Shebekinsky District
- Time zone: UTC+3:00

Meshkovoye (Russian: Мешковое) is a rural locality (a selo) in Shebekinsky District, Belgorod Oblast, Russia. The population was 528 as of 2010. There are 5 streets in the locality.

== Geography ==
Meshkovoye is located 51 km northeast of Shebekino (the district's administrative centre) by road. Babenkov is the nearest rural locality.
