= Romashovka =

Romashovka Ромашовка
- Khutor
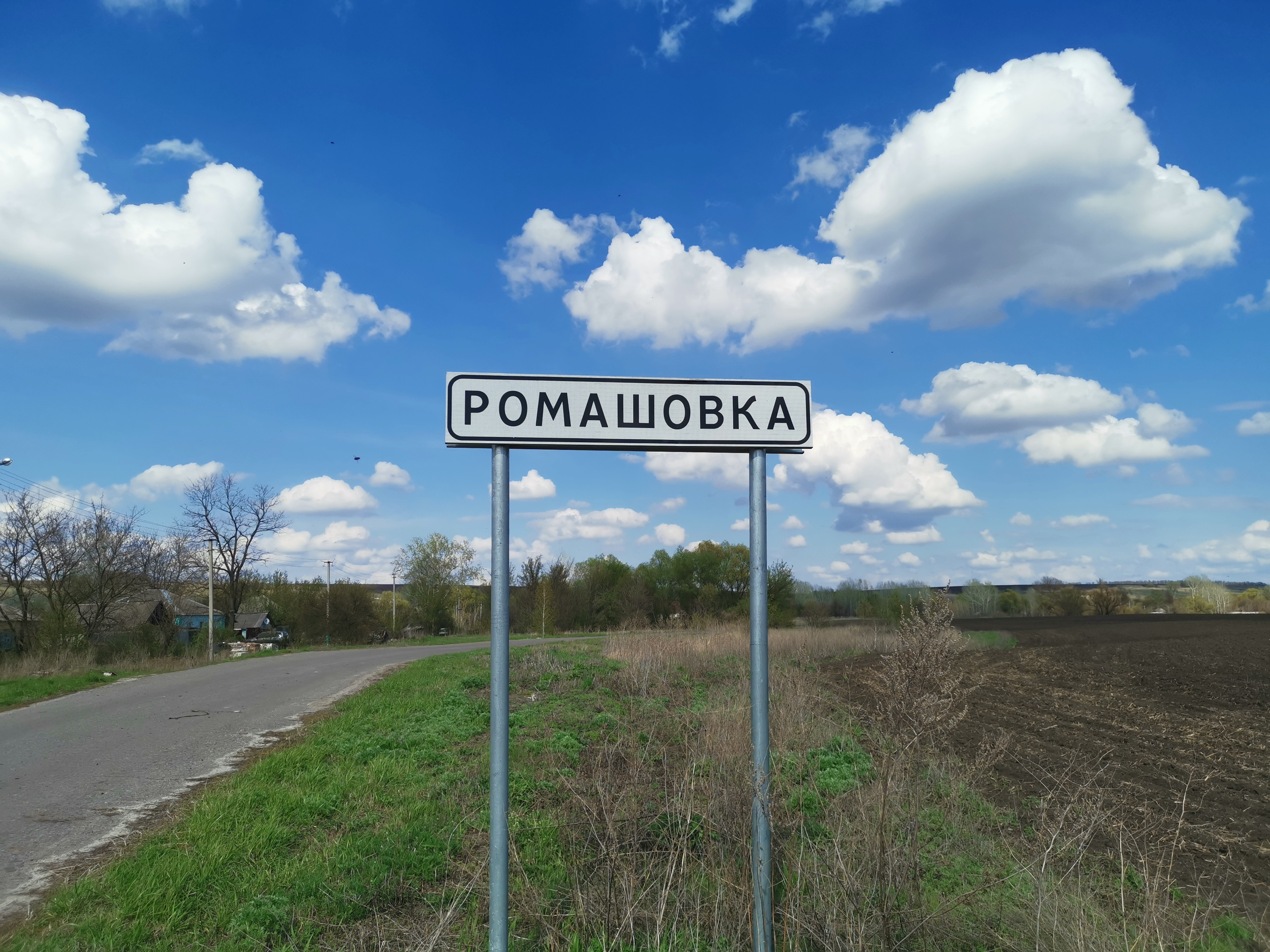

- Location within Belgorod Oblast Location within Russia
- Coordinates: 50°07′N 38°09′E
- Country: Russia
- Region: Belgorod Oblast
- District: Valuysky District
- Time zone: UTC+3:00

Romashovka (Russian: Ромашовка) is a rural locality (a khutor) in Valuysky District, Belgorod Oblast, Russia. The population was 46 as of 2010. There are 2 streets.

== Geography ==
Romashovka is located 19 km southeast of Valuyki (the district's administrative centre) by road. Shelayevo is the nearest rural locality.
