= Kolykhalino =

Kolykhalino Колыхалино
- Selo
- Location within Belgorod Oblast Location within Russia
- Coordinates: 50°08′N 38°05′E
- Country: Russia
- Region: Belgorod Oblast
- District: Valuysky District
- Time zone: UTC+3:00

Kolykhalino (Russian: Колыхалино) is a rural locality (a selo) in Valuysky District, Belgorod Oblast, Russia. The population was 760 as of 2010. There are 6 streets.

== Geography ==
Kolykhalino is located 9 km south of Valuyki (the district's administrative centre) by road. Shelayevo is the nearest rural locality.
