= Striguny =

Striguny Стригуны
- Selo
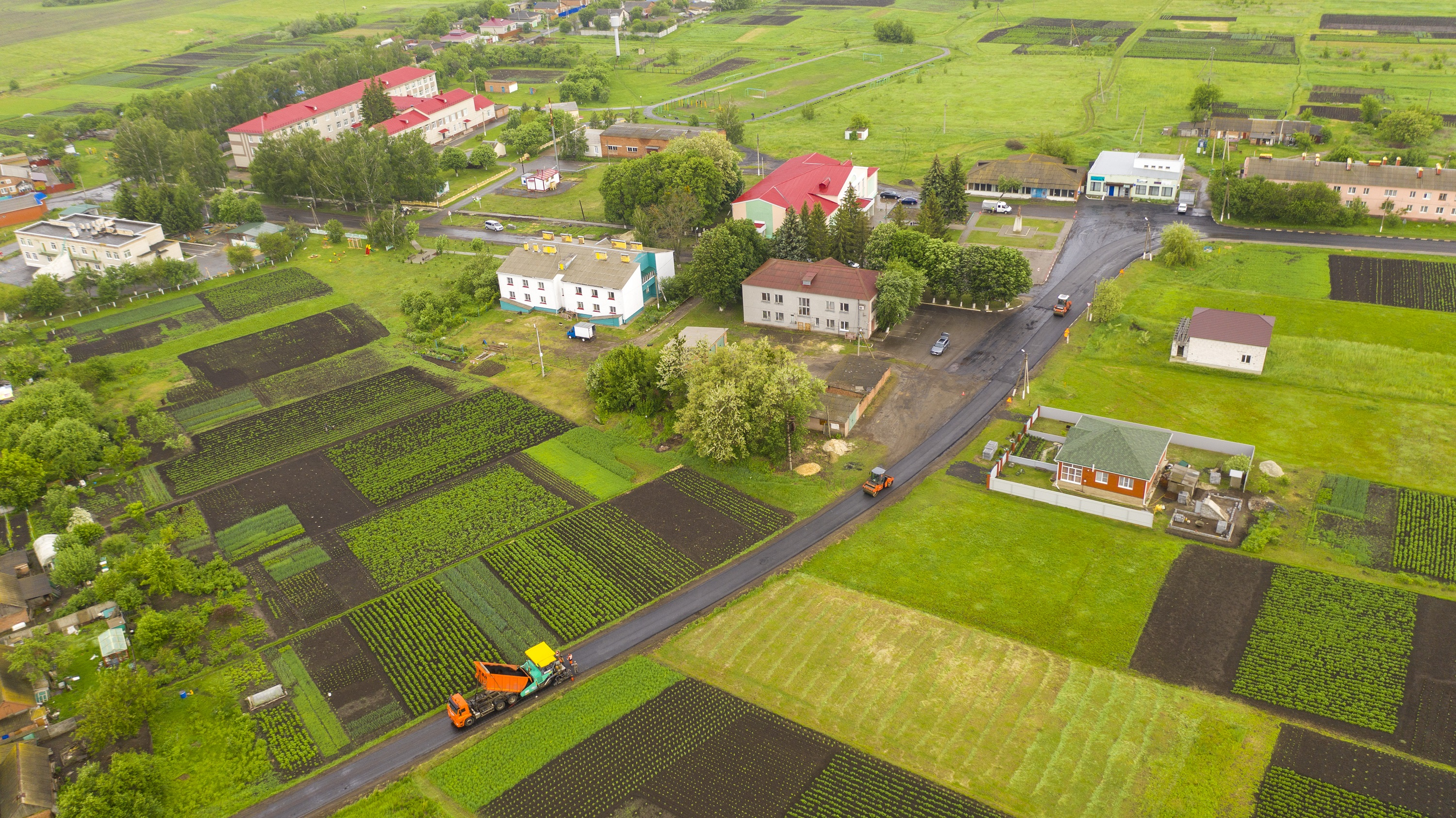
- The village from above

- Location within Belgorod Oblast Location within Russia
- Coordinates: 50°37′N 36°06′E
- Country: Russia
- Region: Belgorod Oblast
- District: Borisovsky District
- Time zone: UTC+3:00

Striguny (Russian: Стригуны) is a rural locality (a selo) and the administrative center of Strigunovskoye Rural Settlement, Borisovsky District, Belgorod Oblast, Russia. The population was 1,913 as of 2010. There are 12 streets.

== Geography ==
Striguny is located 8 km southwest of Borisovka (the district's administrative centre) by road. Zarechnoye is the nearest rural locality.
