= Priznachnoye =

Priznachnoye Призначное
- Selo
- Location within Belgorod Oblast Location within Russia
- Coordinates: 51°02′N 36°51′E
- Country: Russia
- Region: Belgorod Oblast
- District: Prokhorovsky District
- Time zone: UTC+3:00

Priznachnoye (Russian: Призначное) is a rural locality (a selo) and the administrative center of Priznachenskoye Rural Settlement, Prokhorovsky District, Belgorod Oblast, Russia. The population was 615 as of 2010. There are 4 streets.

== Geography ==
Priznachnoye is located 9 km east of Prokhorovka (the district's administrative centre) by road. Vershina is the nearest rural locality.
