= Bublikovo =

Bublikovo Бубликово
- Selo
- Location within Belgorod Oblast Location within Russia
- Coordinates: 50°24′N 38°41′E
- Country: Russia
- Region: Belgorod Oblast
- District: Alexeyevsky District
- Time zone: UTC+3:00

Bublikovo (Russian: Бубликово) is a rural locality (a selo) in Alexeyevsky District, Belgorod Oblast, Russia. The population was 266 as of 2010. There are 3 streets.

== Geography ==
Bublikovo is located 30 km south of Alexeyevka (the district's administrative centre) by road. Zhukovo is the nearest rural locality.
