= Istobnoye =

Istobnoye Истобное
- Selo
- Location within Belgorod Oblast Location within Russia
- Coordinates: 51°06′N 37°19′E
- Country: Russia
- Region: Belgorod Oblast
- District: Gubkinsky District
- Time zone: UTC+3:00

Istobnoye (Russian: Истобное) is a rural locality (a selo) and the administrative center of Istobnyanskaya Territorial Administration, Gubkinsky District, Belgorod Oblast, Russia. The population was 1,515 as of 2010. There are 17 streets.

== Geography ==
Istobnoye is located 34 km southwest of Gubkin (the district's administrative centre) by road. Bogomolye is the nearest rural locality.
