= Dolgaya Polyana =

Dolgaya Polyana Долгая Поляна
- Selo
- Location within Belgorod Oblast Location within Russia
- Coordinates: 51°09′N 37°44′E
- Country: Russia
- Region: Belgorod Oblast
- District: Starooskolsky District
- Time zone: UTC+3:00

Dolgaya Polyana (Russian: Долгая Поляна) is a rural locality (a selo) and the administrative center of Dolgopolyanskaya Rural Settlement, Starooskolsky District, Belgorod Oblast, Russia. The population was 470 as of 2010. There are 8 streets.

== Geography ==
Dolgaya Polyana is located 22 km southwest of Stary Oskol (the district's administrative centre) by road. Prokudino is the nearest rural locality.
