= Zapovedny =

Zapovedny Заповедный
- Settlement
- Location within Belgorod Oblast Location within Russia
- Coordinates: 51°12′N 37°34′E
- Country: Russia
- Region: Belgorod Oblast
- District: Gubkinsky District
- Time zone: UTC+3:00

Zapovedny (Russian: Заповедный) is a rural locality (a settlement) in Gubkinsky District, Belgorod Oblast, Russia. The population was 165 as of 2010. There are 2 streets.

== Geography ==
Zapovedny is located 21 km southeast of Gubkin (the district's administrative centre) by road. Zagorny is the nearest rural locality.
