= Krutoye, Belgorod Oblast =

Krutoye Крутое
- Selo
- Location within Belgorod Oblast Location within Russia
- Coordinates: 51°05′N 38°13′E
- Country: Russia
- Region: Belgorod Oblast
- District: Starooskolsky District
- Time zone: UTC+3:00

Krutoye (Russian: Крутое) is a rural locality (a selo) in Starooskolsky District, Belgorod Oblast, Russia. The population was 260 as of 2010. There are 7 streets.

== Geography ==
Krutoye is located 44 km southeast of Stary Oskol (the district's administrative centre) by road. Glushovka is the nearest rural locality.
