= Sharapovka, Belgorod Oblast =

Sharapovka Шараповка
- Selo
- Location within Belgorod Oblast Location within Russia
- Coordinates: 50°45′N 38°01′E
- Country: Russia
- Region: Belgorod Oblast
- District: Novooskolsky District
- Time zone: UTC+3:00

Sharapovka (Russian: Шараповка) is a rural locality (a selo) and the administrative center of Sharapovskoye Rural Settlement, Novooskolsky District, Belgorod Oblast, Russia. The population was 907 as of 2010. There are 8 streets.

== Geography ==
Sharapovka is located 14 km east of Novy Oskol (the district's administrative centre) by road. Mozolevka is the nearest rural locality.
