= Prokhodnoye =

Prokhodnoye Проходное
- Selo
- Location within Belgorod Oblast Location within Russia
- Coordinates: 50°45′N 37°06′E
- Country: Russia
- Region: Belgorod Oblast
- District: Korochansky District
- Time zone: UTC+3:00

Prokhodnoye (Russian: Проходное) is a rural locality (a selo) and the administrative center of Prokhodenskoye Rural Settlement, Korochansky District, Belgorod Oblast, Russia. The population was 418 as of 2010. There are 4 streets.

== Geography ==
Prokhodnoye is located 11 km southwest of Korocha (the district's administrative centre) by road. Prudki is the nearest rural locality.
