= Repnoye =

Repnoye Репное
- Selo
- Location within Belgorod Oblast Location within Russia
- Coordinates: 50°31′N 36°30′E
- Country: Russia
- Region: Belgorod Oblast
- District: Belgorodsky District
- Time zone: UTC+3:00

Repnoye (Russian: Репное) is a rural locality (a selo) in Belgorodsky District, Belgorod Oblast, Russia. The population was 468 as of 2010. There are 53 streets.

== Geography ==
Repnoye is located 8 km northeast of Maysky (the district's administrative centre) by road. Maysky is the nearest rural locality.
