= Osmakov =

Osmakov Осьмаков
- Khutor
- Location within Belgorod Oblast Location within Russia
- Coordinates: 50°29′N 39°00′E
- Country: Russia
- Region: Belgorod Oblast
- District: Alexeyevsky District
- Time zone: UTC+3:00

Osmakov (Russian: Осьмаков) is a rural locality (a khutor) in Alexeyevsky District, Belgorod Oblast, Russia. The population was 154 as of 2010. There are 2 streets.

== Geography ==
Osmakov is located 42 km southeast of Alexeyevka (the district's administrative centre) by road. Tyutyunikovo is the nearest rural locality.
