= Podyarugi =

Podyarugi Подъяруги
- Selo
- Location within Belgorod Oblast Location within Russia
- Coordinates: 50°55′N 36°56′E
- Country: Russia
- Region: Belgorod Oblast
- District: Prokhorovsky District
- Time zone: UTC+3:00

Podyarugi (Russian: Подъяруги) is a rural locality (a selo) in Prokhorovsky District, Belgorod Oblast, Russia. The population was 83 as of 2010. There are 6 streets.

== Geography ==
Podyarugi is located 28 km southeast of Prokhorovka (the district's administrative centre) by road. Klinovy is the nearest rural locality.
