= Ogibnoye =

Ogibnoye Огибное
- Selo
- Location within Belgorod Oblast Location within Russia
- Coordinates: 51°03′N 37°33′E
- Country: Russia
- Region: Belgorod Oblast
- District: Chernyansky District
- Time zone: UTC+3:00

Ogibnoye (Russian: Огибное) is a rural locality (a selo) and the administrative center of Ogibnyanskoye Rural Settlement, Chernyansky District, Belgorod Oblast, Russia. The population was 664 as of 2010. There are 10 streets.

== Geography ==
Ogibnoye is located 30 km northwest of Chernyanka (the district's administrative centre) by road. Volkovo is the nearest rural locality.
