= Beryozki =

Beryozki Берёзки
- Khutor
- Location within Belgorod Oblast Location within Russia
- Coordinates: 50°34′N 39°04′E
- Country: Russia
- Region: Belgorod Oblast
- District: Alexeyevsky District
- Time zone: UTC+3:00

Beryozki (Russian: Берёзки) is a rural locality (a khutor) in Alexeyevsky District, Belgorod Oblast, Russia. The population was 174 as of 2010. There are 3 streets.

== Geography ==
Beryozki is located 33 km east of Alexeyevka (the district's administrative centre) by road. Ivashchenkovo is the nearest rural locality.
