= Petrovka, Belgorodsky District, Belgorod Oblast =

Petrovka Петровка
- Selo
- Location within Belgorod Oblast Location within Russia
- Coordinates: 50°22′N 36°23′E
- Country: Russia
- Region: Belgorod Oblast
- District: Belgorodsky District
- Time zone: UTC+3:00

Petrovka (Russian: Петровка) is a rural locality (a selo) in Belgorodsky District, Belgorod Oblast, Russia. The population was 413 as of 2010. There are 5 streets.
