= Nemtsevo =

Nemtsevo Немцево
- Selo
- Location within Belgorod Oblast Location within Russia
- Coordinates: 50°36′N 37°41′E
- Country: Russia
- Region: Belgorod Oblast
- District: Novooskolsky District
- Time zone: UTC+3:00

Nemtsevo (Russian: Немцево) is a rural locality (a selo) in Novooskolsky District, Belgorod Oblast, Russia. The population was 240 as of 2010. There are 6 streets.

== Geography ==
Nemtsevo is located 34 km southwest of Novy Oskol (the district's administrative centre) by road. Shevtsov is the nearest rural locality.
