= Krivye Balki =

Krivye Balki Кривые Балки
- Selo
- Location within Belgorod Oblast Location within Russia
- Coordinates: 51°02′N 37°00′E
- Country: Russia
- Region: Belgorod Oblast
- District: Prokhorovsky District
- Time zone: UTC+3:00

Krivye Balki (Russian: Кривые Балки) is a rural locality (a selo) in Prokhorovsky District, Belgorod Oblast, Russia. The population was 160 as of 2010. There is 1 street.

== Geography ==
Krivye Balki is located 21 km east of Prokhorovka (the district's administrative centre) by road. Bogdanovka is the nearest rural locality.
