= Shushpanovo =

Shushpanovo Шушпаново
- Selo
- Location within Belgorod Oblast Location within Russia
- Coordinates: 50°17′N 38°10′E
- Country: Russia
- Region: Belgorod Oblast
- District: Valuysky District
- Time zone: UTC+3:00

Shushpanovo (Russian: Шушпаново) is a rural locality (a selo) in Valuysky District, Belgorod Oblast, Russia. The population was 87 as of 2010. There are 3 streets.

== Geography ==
Shushpanovo is located 22 km northeast of Valuyki (the district's administrative centre) by road. Mayskoye is the nearest rural locality.
