= Khutorishche =

Khutorishche Хуторище
- Khutor
- Location within Belgorod Oblast Location within Russia
- Coordinates: 50°26′N 37°38′E
- Country: Russia
- Region: Belgorod Oblast
- District: Volokonovsky District
- Time zone: UTC+3:00

Khutorishche (Russian: Хуторище) is a rural locality (a khutor) in Volokonovsky District, Belgorod Oblast, Russia. The population was 80 as of 2010. There are 3 streets.

== Geography ==
Khutorishche is located 21 km southwest of Volokonovka (the district's administrative centre) by road. Krasny Pakhar is the nearest rural locality.
