= Kryukovo, Borisovsky District, Belgorod Oblast =

Kryukovo Крюково
- Selo
- Location within Belgorod Oblast Location within Russia
- Coordinates: 50°40′N 35°59′E
- Country: Russia
- Region: Belgorod Oblast
- District: Borisovsky District
- Time zone: UTC+3:00

Kryukovo (Russian: Крюково) is a rural locality (a selo) and the administrative center of Kryukovskoye Rural Settlement, Borisovsky District, Belgorod Oblast, Russia. The population was 919 as of 2010. There are 9 streets.

== Geography ==
Kryukovo is located 9 km north of Borisovka (the district's administrative centre) by road. Chulanovo is the nearest rural locality.
