= Novozinaidinskoye =

Novozinaidinskoye Новозинаидинское
- Selo
- Location within Belgorod Oblast Location within Russia
- Coordinates: 50°52′N 35°52′E
- Country: Russia
- Region: Belgorod Oblast
- District: Rakityansky District
- Time zone: UTC+3:00

Novozinaidinskoye (Russian: Новозинаидинское) is a rural locality (a selo) in Rakityansky District, Belgorod Oblast, Russia. The population was 229 as of 2010. There are 4 streets.

== Geography ==
Novozinaidinskoye is located 7 km north of Rakitnoye (the district's administrative centre) by road. Zinaidino is the nearest rural locality.
