= Klinovets =

Klinovets Клиновец
- Selo
- Location within Belgorod Oblast Location within Russia
- Coordinates: 50°47′N 37°17′E
- Country: Russia
- Region: Belgorod Oblast
- District: Korochansky District
- Time zone: UTC+3:00

Klinovets (Russian: Клиновец) is a rural locality (a selo) in Korochansky District, Belgorod Oblast, Russia. The population was 194 as of 2010. There are 3 streets.

== Geography ==
Klinovets is located 7 km southeast of Korocha (the district's administrative centre) by road. Polivanov is the nearest rural locality.
