= Ploskoye, Korochansky District, Belgorod Oblast =

Ploskoye Плоское
- Selo
- Location within Belgorod Oblast Location within Russia
- Coordinates: 50°43′N 37°00′E
- Country: Russia
- Region: Belgorod Oblast
- District: Korochansky District
- Time zone: UTC+3:00

Ploskoye (Russian: Плоское) is a rural locality (a selo) and the administrative center of Ploskovskoye Rural Settlement, Korochansky District, Belgorod Oblast, Russia. The population was 247 as of 2010. There are 3 streets.

== Geography ==
Ploskoye is located 20 km southwest of Korocha (the district's administrative centre) by road. Peschanoye is the nearest rural locality.
