= Ilyiny =

Ilyiny Ильины
- Khutor
- Location within Belgorod Oblast Location within Russia
- Coordinates: 51°18′N 37°58′E
- Country: Russia
- Region: Belgorod Oblast
- District: Starooskolsky District
- Time zone: UTC+3:00

Ilyiny (Russian: Ильины) is a rural locality (a khutor) in Starooskolsky District, Belgorod Oblast, Russia. The population was 90 as of 2010. There are 3 streets.

== Geography ==
Ilyiny is located 14 km east of Stary Oskol (the district's administrative centre) by road. Kotovo is the nearest rural locality.
