= Nagolnoye, Starooskolsky District, Belgorod Oblast =

Nagolnoye Нагольное
- Selo
- Location within Belgorod Oblast Location within Russia
- Coordinates: 51°02′N 38°10′E
- Country: Russia
- Region: Belgorod Oblast
- District: Starooskolsky District
- Time zone: UTC+3:00

Nagolnoye (Russian: Нагольное) is a rural locality (a selo) in Starooskolsky District, Belgorod Oblast, Russia. The population was 192 as of 2010. There are 4 streets.

== Geography ==
Nagolnoye is located 44 km southeast of Stary Oskol (the district's administrative centre) by road. Novorechye is the nearest rural locality.
