= Ternovoye, Starooskolsky District, Belgorod Oblast =

Ternovoye Терновое
- Selo
- Location within Belgorod Oblast Location within Russia
- Coordinates: 51°10′N 38°07′E
- Country: Russia
- Region: Belgorod Oblast
- District: Starooskolsky District
- Time zone: UTC+3:00

Ternovoye (Russian: Терновое) is a rural locality (a selo) in Starooskolsky District, Belgorod Oblast, Russia. The population was 188 as of 2010. There are 5 streets.

== Geography ==
Ternovoye is located 33 km southeast of Stary Oskol (the district's administrative centre) by road. Maly Prisynok is the nearest rural locality.
