= Kopanets =

Kopanets Копанец
- Khutor
- Location within Belgorod Oblast Location within Russia
- Coordinates: 50°29′N 38°55′E
- Country: Russia
- Region: Belgorod Oblast
- District: Alexeyevsky District
- Time zone: UTC+3:00

Kopanets (Russian: Копанец) is a rural locality (a khutor) in Alexeyevsky District, Belgorod Oblast, Russia. The population was 190 as of 2010. There are 3 streets.

== Geography ==
Kopanets is located 25 km southeast of Alexeyevka (the district's administrative centre) by road. Shkuropatov is the nearest rural locality.
