= Novosoldatka =

Novosoldatka Новосолдатка
- Selo
- Location within Belgorod Oblast Location within Russia
- Coordinates: 50°56′N 38°30′E
- Country: Russia
- Region: Belgorod Oblast
- District: Krasnensky District
- Time zone: UTC+3:00

Novosoldatka (Russian: Новосолдатка) is a rural locality (a selo) in Krasnensky District, Belgorod Oblast, Russia. The population was 343 as of 2010. There are 4 streets.

== Geography ==
Novosoldatka is located 18 km west of Krasnoye (the district's administrative centre) by road. Novy Put is the nearest rural locality.
