= Babenkov =

Babenkov Бабенков
- Khutor
- Location within Belgorod Oblast Location within Russia
- Coordinates: 50°29′N 37°24′E
- Country: Russia
- Region: Belgorod Oblast
- District: Shebekinsky District
- Time zone: UTC+3:00

Babenkov (Russian: Бабенков) is a rural locality (a khutor) in Shebekinsky District, Belgorod Oblast, Russia. The population was 95 as of 2010. There are 2 streets.

== Geography ==
Babenkov is located 50 km northeast of Shebekino (the district's administrative centre) by road. Meshkovoye is the nearest rural locality.
