= Trefilovka =

Trefilovka Трефиловка
- Selo
- Location within Belgorod Oblast Location within Russia
- Coordinates: 50°42′N 35°53′E
- Country: Russia
- Region: Belgorod Oblast
- District: Rakityansky District
- Time zone: UTC+3:00

Trefilovka (Russian: Трефиловка) is a rural locality (a selo) and the administrative center of Trefilovskoye Rural Settlement, Rakityansky District, Belgorod Oblast, Russia. The population was 1,419 as of 2010. There are 12 streets.

== Geography ==
Trefilovka is located 18 km southeast of Rakitnoye (the district's administrative centre) by road. Vvedenskaya Gotnya is the nearest rural locality.
