= Opytny =

Opytny Опытный
- Settlement
- Location within Belgorod Oblast Location within Russia
- Coordinates: 50°06′N 38°28′E
- Country: Russia
- Region: Belgorod Oblast
- District: Veydelevsky District
- Time zone: UTC+3:00

Opytny (Russian: Опытный) is a rural locality (a settlement) in Veydelevsky District, Belgorod Oblast, Russia. The population was 166 as of 2010. There are 5 streets.

== Geography ==
Opytny is located 6 km southeast of Veydelevka (the district's administrative centre) by road. Viktoropol is the nearest rural locality.
