= Verkhniye Lubyanki =

Verkhniye Lubyanki Верхние Лубянки
- Selo
- Location within Belgorod Oblast Location within Russia
- Coordinates: 50°26′N 37°44′E
- Country: Russia
- Region: Belgorod Oblast
- District: Volokonovsky District
- Time zone: UTC+3:00

Verkhniye Lubyanki (Russian: Верхние Лубянки) is a rural locality (a selo) in Volokonovsky District, Belgorod Oblast, Russia. The population was 264 as of 2010. There are 6 streets.

== Geography ==
Verkhniye Lubyanki is located 12 km southwest of Volokonovka (the district's administrative centre) by road. Yevdokimov is the nearest rural locality.
