= Shmarnoye =

Shmarnoye Шмарное
- Selo
- Location within Belgorod Oblast Location within Russia
- Coordinates: 51°07′N 37°51′E
- Country: Russia
- Region: Belgorod Oblast
- District: Starooskolsky District
- Time zone: UTC+3:00

Shmarnoye (Russian: Шмарное) is a rural locality (a selo) in Starooskolsky District, Belgorod Oblast, Russia. The population was 271 as of 2010. There are 11 streets.

== Geography ==
Shmarnoye is located 28 km south of Stary Oskol (the district's administrative centre) by road. Kazachok is the nearest rural locality.
