= Repenka =

Repenka Репенка
- Selo
- Location within Belgorod Oblast Location within Russia
- Coordinates: 50°47′N 38°46′E
- Country: Russia
- Region: Belgorod Oblast
- District: Alexeyevsky District
- Time zone: UTC+3:00

Repenka (Russian: Репенка) is a rural locality (a selo) and the administrative center of Repenskoye Rural Settlement, Alexeyevsky District, Belgorod Oblast, Russia. The population was 572 as of 2010. There are 6 streets.

== Geography ==
Repenka is located 24 km northeast of Alexeyevka (the district's administrative centre) by road. Khokhol-Trostyanka is the nearest rural locality.
