= Vyazovoye =

Vyazovoye Вязовое
- Selo
- Location within Belgorod Oblast Location within Russia
- Coordinates: 50°47′N 35°29′E
- Country: Russia
- Region: Belgorod Oblast
- District: Krasnoyaruzhsky District
- Time zone: UTC+3:00

Vyazovoye (Russian: Вязовое, IPA: [vʲɐˈzo.və.jɪ]) is a rural locality (a selo) and the administrative center of Vyazovskoye rural settlement, Krasnoyaruzhsky District, Belgorod Oblast, Russia. The population was 934 as of 2010. There are 13 streets.

== Geography ==
Vyazovoye is located 15 km west of Krasnaya Yaruga (the district's administrative centre) by road. Kolotilovka is the nearest rural locality.
