= Ignatovka, Belgorod Oblast =

Ignatovka Игнатовка
- Khutor
- Location within Belgorod Oblast Location within Russia
- Coordinates: 51°12′N 37°55′E
- Country: Russia
- Region: Belgorod Oblast
- District: Starooskolsky District
- Time zone: UTC+3:00

Ignatovka (Russian: Игнатовка) is a rural locality (a khutor) in Starooskolsky District, Belgorod Oblast, Russia. The population was 57 as of 2010. There is 1 street.

== Geography ==
Ignatovka is located 20 km south of Stary Oskol (the district's administrative centre) by road. Vypolzovo is the nearest rural locality.
