= Pogorelovka =

Pogorelovka Погореловка
- Selo
- Location within Belgorod Oblast Location within Russia
- Coordinates: 50°48′N 37°09′E
- Country: Russia
- Region: Belgorod Oblast
- District: Korochansky District
- Time zone: UTC+3:00

Pogorelovka (Russian: Погореловка) is a rural locality (a selo) and the administrative center of Pogorelovskoye Rural Settlement, Korochansky District, Belgorod Oblast, Russia. The population was 2,218 as of 2010. There are 26 streets.

== Geography ==
Pogorelovka is located 4 km southwest of Korocha (the district's administrative centre) by road. Pogorely is the nearest rural locality.
