= Gayevka =

Gayevka Гаевка
- Khutor
- Location within Belgorod Oblast Location within Russia
- Coordinates: 50°27′N 37°31′E
- Country: Russia
- Region: Belgorod Oblast
- District: Volokonovsky District
- Time zone: UTC+3:00

Gayevka (Russian: Гаевка) is a rural locality (a khutor) in Volokonovsky District, Belgorod Oblast, Russia. The population was 11 as of 2010. There is 1 street.

== Geography ==
Gayevka is located 32 km west of Volokonovka (the district's administrative centre) by road. Volchy-Vtoroy is the nearest rural locality.
