= Kositsino, Belgorod Oblast =

Kositsino Косицино
- Selo
- Location within Belgorod Oblast Location within Russia
- Coordinates: 50°41′N 37°52′E
- Country: Russia
- Region: Belgorod Oblast
- District: Novooskolsky District
- Time zone: UTC+3:00

Kositsino (Russian: Косицино) is a rural locality (a selo) in Novooskolsky District, Belgorod Oblast, Russia. The population was 164 as of 2010. There are 3 streets.

== Geography ==
Kositsino is located 10 km south of Novy Oskol (the district's administrative centre) by road. Fironovka is the nearest rural locality.
