= Vyshniye Peny =

Vyshniye Peny Вышние Пены
- Selo
- Location within Belgorod Oblast Location within Russia
- Coordinates: 50°07′N 36°00′E
- Country: Russia
- Region: Belgorod Oblast
- District: Rakityansky District
- Time zone: UTC+3:00

Vyshniye Peny (Russian: Вышние Пены) is a rural locality (a selo) and the administrative center of Vyshnepenskoye Rural Settlement, Rakityansky District, Belgorod Oblast, Russia. The population was 904 as of 2010. There are 12 streets.

== Geography ==
Vyshniye Peny is located 24 km northeast of Rakitnoye (the district's administrative centre) by road. Vengerovka is the nearest rural locality.
