= Babichev, Belgorod Oblast =

Babichev Бабичев
- Khutor
- Location within Belgorod Oblast Location within Russia
- Coordinates: 50°27′N 38°57′E
- Country: Russia
- Region: Belgorod Oblast
- District: Alexeyevsky District
- Time zone: UTC+3:00

Babichev (Russian: Бабичев) is a rural locality (a khutor) in Alexeyevsky District, Belgorod Oblast, Russia. The population was 94 as of 2010. There are two streets.

== Geography ==
Babichev is located 39 km southeast of Alexeyevka (the district's administrative centre) by road. Lutsenkovo is the nearest rural locality.
