= Kiselev, Belgorod Oblast =

Kiselev Киселев
- Khutor
- Location within Belgorod Oblast Location within Russia
- Coordinates: 50°19′N 37°35′E
- Country: Russia
- Region: Belgorod Oblast
- District: Volokonovsky District
- Time zone: UTC+3:00

Kiselev (Russian: Киселев) is a rural locality (a khutor) in Volokonovsky District, Belgorod Oblast, Russia. The population was 31 as of 2010. There are 4 streets.

== Geography ==
Kiselev is located 34 km southwest of Volokonovka (the district's administrative centre) by road. Borisovka is the nearest rural locality.
