= Osadcheye =

Osadcheye Осадчее
- Selo
- Location within Belgorod Oblast Location within Russia
- Coordinates: 50°21′N 38°55′E
- Country: Russia
- Region: Belgorod Oblast
- District: Alexeyevsky District
- Time zone: UTC+3:00

Osadcheye (Russian: Осадчее) is a rural locality (a selo) in Alexeyevsky District, Belgorod Oblast, Russia. The population was 234 as of 2010. There are 3 streets.

== Geography ==
Osadcheye is located 39 km south of Alexeyevka (the district's administrative centre) by road. Kalitva is the nearest rural locality.
