= Olkhov, Belgorod Oblast =

Olkhov Ольхов
- Khutor
- Location within Belgorod Oblast Location within Russia
- Coordinates: 50°37′N 37°56′E
- Country: Russia
- Region: Belgorod Oblast
- District: Volokonovsky District
- Time zone: UTC+3:00

Olkhov (Russian: Ольхов) is a rural locality (a khutor) in Volokonovsky District, Belgorod Oblast, Russia. The population was 18 as of 2010. There is 1 street.

== Geography ==
Olkhov is located 20 km north of Volokonovka (the district's administrative centre) by road. Nikolayevka is the nearest rural locality.
