= Kazachye, Belgorod Oblast =

Kazachye Казачье
- Selo
- Location within Belgorod Oblast Location within Russia
- Coordinates: 50°48′N 36°52′E
- Country: Russia
- Region: Belgorod Oblast
- District: Prokhorovsky District
- Time zone: UTC+3:00

Kazachye (Russian: Казачье) is a rural locality (a selo) in Prokhorovsky District, Belgorod Oblast, Russia. The population was 127 as of 2010. There are five streets.

== Geography ==
Kazachye is located 35 km southeast of Prokhorovka (the district's administrative centre) by road. Kurakovka is the nearest rural locality.
