= Shcherbakovo =

Shcherbatovo Щербаково
- Selo
- Location within Belgorod Oblast Location within Russia
- Coordinates: 50°31′N 38°38′E
- Country: Russia
- Region: Belgorod Oblast
- District: Alexeyevsky District
- Time zone: UTC+3:00

Shcherbakovo (Russian: Щербакóво) is a rural locality (a selo) in Alexeyevsky District, Belgorod Oblast, Russia. The population was 413 as of 2010. There are 5 streets.

== Geography ==
Shcherbakovo is located 14 km south of Alexeyevka (the district's administrative centre) by road. Kushchino is the nearest rural locality.
