= Oleynitsky =

Oleynitsky Олейницкий
- Khutor
- Location within Belgorod Oblast Location within Russia
- Coordinates: 50°36′N 37°54′E
- Country: Russia
- Region: Belgorod Oblast
- District: Volokonovsky District
- Time zone: UTC+3:00

Oleynitsky (Russian: Олейницкий) is a rural locality (a khutor) in Volokonovsky District, Belgorod Oblast, Russia. The population was 25 as of 2010. There is one street.

== Geography ==
Oleynitsky is located 22 km (14 mi) north of Volokonovka (the district's administrative centre) by road. Olkhov is the nearest rural locality.
