= Valuy =

Valuy Валуй
- Selo
- Location within Belgorod Oblast Location within Russia
- Coordinates: 50°30′N 38°23′E
- Country: Russia
- Region: Belgorod Oblast
- District: Krasnogvardeysky District
- Time zone: UTC+3:00

Valuy (Russian: Валуй) is a rural locality (a selo) in Krasnogvardeysky District, Belgorod Oblast, Russia. The population was 314 as of 2010. There are 3 streets.

== Geography ==
Valuy is located 21 km (13 mi) south of Biryuch (the district's administrative centre) by road. Biryuch is the nearest rural locality.
