= Koshlakovo =

Koshlakovo Кошлаково
- Selo
- Location within Belgorod Oblast Location within Russia
- Coordinates: 50°31′N 36°52′E
- Country: Russia
- Region: Belgorod Oblast
- District: Shebekinsky District
- Time zone: UTC+3:00

Koshlakovo (Russian: Кошлаково) is a rural locality (a selo) in Shebekinsky District, Belgorod Oblast, Russia. The population was 682 as of 2010. There are 6 streets.

== Geography ==
Koshlakovo is located 15 km north of Shebekino (the district's administrative centre) by road. Pentsevo is the nearest rural locality.
