= Chumaki =

Chumaki Чумаки
- Khutor
- Location within Belgorod Oblast Location within Russia
- Coordinates: 51°19′N 38°00′E
- Country: Russia
- Region: Belgorod Oblast
- District: Starooskolsky District
- Time zone: UTC+3:00

Chumaki (Russian: Чумаки) is a rural locality (a khutor) in Starooskolsky District, Belgorod Oblast, Russia. The population was 37 as of 2010. There are 5 streets.

== Geography ==
Chumaki is located 15 km east of Stary Oskol (the district's administrative centre) by road. Kotovo is the nearest rural locality.
