= Teplinka =

Teplinka Теплинка
- Selo
- Location within Belgorod Oblast Location within Russia
- Coordinates: 50°29′N 38°38′E
- Country: Russia
- Region: Belgorod Oblast
- District: Alexeyevsky District
- Time zone: UTC+3:00

Teplinka (Russian: Теплинка) is a rural locality (a selo) in Alexeyevsky District, Belgorod Oblast, Russia. The population was 213 as of 2010. There are 5 streets.

== Geography ==
Teplinka is located 18 km south of Alexeyevka (the district's administrative centre) by road. Shcherbakovo is the nearest rural locality.
