= Nezhegol =

Nezhegol Нежеголь
- Selo
- Location within Belgorod Oblast Location within Russia
- Coordinates: 50°25′N 37°00′E
- Country: Russia
- Region: Belgorod Oblast
- District: Shebekinsky District
- Time zone: UTC+3:00

Nezhegol (Russian: Нежеголь) is a rural locality (a selo) in Shebekinsky District, Belgorod Oblast, Russia. The population was 1,156 as of 2010. There are 11 streets.

== Geography ==
Nezhegol is located 17 km east of Shebekino (the district's administrative centre) by road. Voznesenovka is the nearest rural locality.
