= Zasosna =

Zasosna Засосна
- Selo
- Location within Belgorod Oblast Location within Russia
- Coordinates: 50°37′N 38°23′E
- Country: Russia
- Region: Belgorod Oblast
- District: Krasnogvardeysky District
- Time zone: UTC+3:00

Zasosna (Russian: Засосна) is a rural locality (a selo) and the administrative center of Zasosenskoye Rural Settlement, Krasnogvardeysky District, Belgorod Oblast, Russia. Its population was 3,806 (2021 census); 4,213 (2010 census). There are 34 streets.

== Geography ==
Zasosna is located 3 km (1.9 mi) south of Biryuch (the district's administrative centre) by road. Biryuch is the nearest rural locality.
