= Ignatov, Belgorod Oblast =

Ignatov Игнатов
- Khutor
- Location within Belgorod Oblast Location within Russia
- Coordinates: 50°37′N 38°37′E
- Country: Russia
- Region: Belgorod Oblast
- District: Alexeyevsky District
- Time zone: UTC+3:00

Ignatov (Russian: Игнатов) is a rural locality (a khutor) in Alexeyevsky District, Belgorod Oblast, Russia. The population was 55 as of 2010. There are 2 streets.

== Geography ==
Ignatov is located 6 km west of Alexeyevka (the district's administrative centre) by road. Alexeyevka is the nearest rural locality.
