= Streletskoye, Krasnogvardeysky District, Belgorod Oblast =

Streletskoye Стрелецкое
- Selo
- Location within Belgorod Oblast Location within Russia
- Coordinates: 50°40′N 38°28′E
- Country: Russia
- Region: Belgorod Oblast
- District: Krasnogvardeysky District
- Time zone: UTC+3:00

Streletskoye (Russian: Стрелецкое) is a rural locality (a selo) in Krasnogvardeysky District, Belgorod Oblast, Russia. The population was 690 as of 2010. There are 9 streets.

== Geography ==
Streletskoye is located 10 km (6.2 mi) northeast of Biryuch (the district's administrative centre) by road. Yamki is the nearest rural locality.
