= Grafovka, Shebekinsky District, Belgorod Oblast =

Grafovka Графовка
- Selo
- Interactive map of Grafovka
- Location within Belgorod Oblast Location within Russia
- Coordinates: 50°24′N 36°44′E
- Country: Russia
- Region: Belgorod Oblast
- District: Shebekinsky District
- Time zone: UTC+3:00

Grafovka (Russian: Графовка) is a rural locality (a selo) and the administrative center of Grafovskoye Rural Settlement, Shebekinsky District, Belgorod Oblast, Russia. The population was 1,611 as of 2010. There are 27 streets.

== Geography ==
Grafovka is located 18 km west of Shebekino (the district's administrative centre) by road. Bezlyudovka is the nearest rural locality.
