= Glushkovka =

Glushkovka Глушковка
- Khutor
- Location within Belgorod Oblast Location within Russia
- Coordinates: 51°05′N 38°10′E
- Country: Russia
- Region: Belgorod Oblast
- District: Starooskolsky District
- Time zone: UTC+3:00

Glushkovka (Russian: Глушковка) is a rural locality (a khutor) in Starooskolsky District, Belgorod Oblast, Russia. The population was 206 as of 2010. There are 3 streets.

== Geography ==
Glushkovka is located 43 km southeast of Stary Oskol (the district's administrative centre) by road. Krutoye is the nearest rural locality.
