= Vladimirvoka, Starooskolsky District, Belgorod Oblast =

Vladimirvoka Владимировка
- Selo
- Location within Belgorod Oblast Location within Russia
- Coordinates: 51°06′N 38°21′E
- Country: Russia
- Region: Belgorod Oblast
- District: Starooskolsky District
- Time zone: UTC+3:00

Vladimirvoka (Russian: Владимировка) is a rural locality (a selo) in Starooskolsky District, Belgorod Oblast, Russia. The population was 712 as of 2010. There are 11 streets.

== Geography ==
Vladimirvoka is located 53 km southeast of Stary Oskol (the district's administrative centre) by road. Vysoky is the nearest rural locality.
