= Vorobyovo, Belgorod Oblast =

Vorobyovo Воробьёво
- Selo
- Location within Belgorod Oblast Location within Russia
- Coordinates: 50°35′N 38°57′E
- Country: Russia
- Region: Belgorod Oblast
- District: Alexeyevsky District
- Time zone: UTC+3:00

Vorobyovo (Russian: Воробьёво) is a rural locality (a selo) in Alexeyevsky District, Belgorod Oblast, Russia. The population was 179 as of 2010. There are 2 streets.

== Geography ==
Vorobyovo is located 25 km east of Alexeyevka (the district's administrative centre) by road. Pirogovo is the nearest rural locality.
