= Shaporevo =

Shaporevo Шапорево
- Selo
- Location within Belgorod Oblast Location within Russia
- Coordinates: 50°24′N 38°59′E
- Country: Russia
- Region: Belgorod Oblast
- District: Alexeyevsky District
- Time zone: UTC+3:00

Shaporevo (Russian: Шапорево) is a rural locality (a selo) in Alexeyevsky District, Belgorod Oblast, Russia. The population was 42 as of 2010. There is 1 street.

== Geography ==
Shaporevo is located 53 km southeast of Alexeyevka (the district's administrative centre) by road. Nikolayevka is the nearest rural locality.
