= Golubino =

Golubino Голубино
- Selo
- Location within Belgorod Oblast Location within Russia
- Coordinates: 50°49′N 37°46′E
- Country: Russia
- Region: Belgorod Oblast
- District: Novooskolsky District
- Time zone: UTC+3:00

Golubino (Russian: Голубино) is a rural locality (a selo) in Novooskolsky District, Belgorod Oblast, Russia. The population was 1,154 as of 2010. There are 5 streets.

== Geography ==
Golubino is located 14 km northwest of Novy Oskol (the district's administrative centre) by road. Miroshniki is the nearest rural locality.
