= Pasechny =

Pasechny Пасечный
- Settlement
- Location within Belgorod Oblast Location within Russia
- Coordinates: 51°17′N 38°17′E
- Country: Russia
- Region: Belgorod Oblast
- District: Starooskolsky District
- Time zone: UTC+3:00

Pasechny (Russian: Пасечный) is a rural locality (a settlement) in Starooskolsky District, Belgorod Oblast, Russia. The population was 34 as of 2010. There are 2 streets.

== Geography ==
Pasechny is located 41 km east of Stary Oskol (the district's administrative centre) by road. Frolov is the nearest rural locality.
