= Prokudino =

Prokudino Прокудино
- Selo
- Location within Belgorod Oblast Location within Russia
- Coordinates: 51°09′N 37°44′E
- Country: Russia
- Region: Belgorod Oblast
- District: Starooskolsky District
- Time zone: UTC+3:00

Prokudino (Russian: Прокудино) is a rural locality (a selo) in Starooskolsky District, Belgorod Oblast, Russia. The population was 458 as of 2010. There are 8 streets.

== Geography ==
Prokudino is located 22 km southwest of Stary Oskol (the district's administrative centre) by road. Dolgaya Polyana is the nearest rural locality.
