= Afanasyevka =

Afanasyevka Афанасьевка
- Selo
- Location within Belgorod Oblast Location within Russia
- Coordinates: 50°47′N 38°35′E
- Country: Russia
- Region: Belgorod Oblast
- District: Alexeyevsky District
- Time zone: UTC+3:00

Afanasyevka (Russian: Афанасьевка) is a rural locality (a selo) and the administrative center of Afanasyevskoye Rural Settlement, Alexeyevsky District, Belgorod Oblast, Russia. The population was 1,265 as of 2010, making it a small town. There are 9 streets.

== Geography ==
Afanasyevka is located 21 km northwest of Alexeyevka (the district's administrative centre) by road. Kamyzino is the nearest rural locality.
