= Gerashchenkovo =

Gerashchenkovo Геращенково
- Settlement
- Location within Belgorod Oblast Location within Russia
- Coordinates: 50°18′N 38°57′E
- Country: Russia
- Region: Belgorod Oblast
- District: Alexeyevsky District
- Time zone: UTC+3:00

Gerashchenkovo (Russian: Геращенково) is a rural locality (a settlement) in Alexeyevsky District, Belgorod Oblast, Russia. The population was 108 as of 2010. There is 1 street.

== Geography ==
Gerashchenkovo is located 50 km southeast of Alexeyevka (the district's administrative centre) by road. Khmyzovka is the nearest rural locality.
