= Khmelevets =

Khmelevets Хмелевец
- Selo
- Location within Belgorod Oblast Location within Russia
- Coordinates: 50°22′N 38°02′E
- Country: Russia
- Region: Belgorod Oblast
- District: Valuysky District
- Time zone: UTC+3:00

Khmelevets (Russian: Хмелевец) is a rural locality (a selo) in Valuysky District, Belgorod Oblast, Russia. The population was 266 as of 2010. There are 16 streets.

== Geography ==
Khmelevets is located 23 km north of Valuyki (the district's administrative centre) by road. Foshchevatovo is the nearest rural locality.
