= Kotenevka =

Kotenevka Котеневка
- Selo
- Location within Belgorod Oblast Location within Russia
- Coordinates: 51°12′N 37°43′E
- Country: Russia
- Region: Belgorod Oblast
- District: Starooskolsky District
- Time zone: UTC+3:00

Kotenevka (Russian: Котеневка) is a rural locality (a selo) in Starooskolsky District, Belgorod Oblast, Russia. The population was 200 as of 2010. There are 7 streets.

== Geography ==
Kotenevka is located 16 km southwest of Stary Oskol (the district's administrative centre) by road. Verkhne-Chufichevo is the nearest rural locality.
