= Aleynikovo =

Aleynikovo Алейниково
- Selo
- Location within Belgorod Oblast Location within Russia
- Coordinates: 50°28′N 38°49′E
- Country: Russia
- Region: Belgorod Oblast
- District: Alexeyevsky District
- Time zone: UTC+3:00

Aleynikovo (Russian: Алейниково) is a rural locality (a selo) and the administrative center of Aleynikovskoye Rural Settlement, Alexeyevsky District, Belgorod Oblast, Russia. The population was 490 as of 2010. There are 11 streets.

== Geography ==
Aleynikovo is located 27 km southeast of Alexeyevka (the district's administrative centre) by road. Novosyolovka is the nearest rural locality.
