= Repenka, Krasnogvardeysky District, Belgorod Oblast =

Repenka Репенка
- Selo
- Location within Belgorod Oblast Location within Russia
- Coordinates: 50°43′N 38°22′E
- Country: Russia
- Region: Belgorod Oblast
- District: Krasnogvardeysky District
- Time zone: UTC+3:00

Repenka (Russian: Репенка) is a rural locality (a selo) in Krasnogvardeysky District, Belgorod Oblast, Russia. The population was 209 as of 2010. There are 2 streets.

== Geography ==
Repenka is located 20 km (12 mi) north of Biryuch (the district's administrative centre) by road. Maryevka is the nearest rural locality.
