= Orlinoye =

Orlinoye Орлиное
- Selo
- Location within Belgorod Oblast Location within Russia
- Coordinates: 50°27′N 37°57′E
- Country: Russia
- Region: Belgorod Oblast
- District: Volokonovsky District
- Time zone: UTC+3:00

Orlinoye (Russian: Орлиное) is a rural locality (a selo) in Volokonovsky District, Belgorod Oblast, Russia. The population was 5 as of 2010. There is 1 street.

== Geography ==
Orlinoye is located 10 km southeast of Volokonovka (the district's administrative centre) by road. Krasnaya Niva is the nearest rural locality.
