= Nizhniye Peny =

Nizhniye Peny Нижние Пены
- Selo
- Location within Belgorod Oblast Location within Russia
- Coordinates: 51°00′N 35°57′E
- Country: Russia
- Region: Belgorod Oblast
- District: Rakityansky District
- Time zone: UTC+3:00

Nizhniye Peny (Russian: Нижние Пены) is a rural locality (a selo) and the administrative center of Nizhnepenskoye Rural Settlement, Rakityansky District, Belgorod Oblast, Russia. The population was 990 as of 2010. There are 8 streets.

== Geography ==
Nizhniye Peny is located 30 km northeast of Rakitnoye (the district's administrative centre) by road. Dragunka is the nearest rural locality.
