= Maximovka, Belgorod Oblast =

Maximovka Максимовка
- Selo
- Location within Belgorod Oblast Location within Russia
- Coordinates: 50°31′N 37°21′E
- Country: Russia
- Region: Belgorod Oblast
- District: Shebekinsky District
- Time zone: UTC+3:00

Maximovka (Russian: Максимовка) is a rural locality (a selo) and the administrative center of Maximovskoye Rural Settlement, Shebekinsky District, Belgorod Oblast, Russia. The population was 850 as of 2010. There are 7 streets.

== Geography ==
Maximovka is located 44 km northeast of Shebekino (the district's administrative centre) by road. Shemrayevka is the nearest rural locality.
