= Tolokonnoye =

Tolokonnoye Толоконное
- Selo
- Location within Belgorod Oblast Location within Russia
- Coordinates: 50°23′N 36°22′E
- Country: Russia
- Region: Belgorod Oblast
- District: Belgorodsky District
- Time zone: UTC+3:00

Tolokonnoye (Russian: Толоконное) is a rural locality (a selo) in Belgorodsky District, Belgorod Oblast, Russia. The population was 68 as of 2010. There are 4 streets.

== Geography ==
Tolokonnoye is located 17 km southwest of Maysky (the district's administrative centre) by road. Solovyevka is the nearest rural locality.
