= Gnezdilovka =

Gnezdilovka Гнездиловка
- Selo
- Location within Belgorod Oblast Location within Russia
- Coordinates: 50°54′N 36°51′E
- Country: Russia
- Region: Belgorod Oblast
- District: Prokhorovsky District
- Time zone: UTC+3:00

Gnezdilovka (Russian: Гнездиловка) is a rural locality (a selo) in Prokhorovsky District, Belgorod Oblast, Russia. The population was 77 as of 2010. There are 3 streets.

== Geography ==
Gnezdilovka is located 28 km southeast of Prokhorovka (the district's administrative centre) by road. Chernovka is the nearest rural locality.
