= Novaya Zarya =

Novaya Zarya Новая Заря
- Khutor
- Location within Belgorod Oblast Location within Russia
- Coordinates: 50°30′N 37°05′E
- Country: Russia
- Region: Belgorod Oblast
- District: Shebekinsky District
- Time zone: UTC+3:00

Novaya Zarya (Russian: Новая Заря) is a rural locality (a khutor) in Shebekinsky District, Belgorod Oblast, Russia. The population was 10 as of 2010. There are 2 streets.

== Geography ==
Novaya Zarya is located 46 km northeast of Shebekino (the district's administrative centre) by road. Zavodtsy is the nearest rural locality.
