= Nagolnoye =

Nagolnoye Нагольное
- Selo
- Location within Belgorod Oblast Location within Russia
- Coordinates: 49°58′N 38°59′E
- Country: Russia
- Region: Belgorod Oblast
- District: Rovensky District
- Time zone: UTC+3:00

Nagolnoye (Russian: Нагольное) is a rural locality (a selo) and the administrative center of Nagolenskoye Rural Settlement, Rovensky District, Belgorod Oblast, Russia. The population was 1,080 as of 2010. There are 8 streets.

== Geography ==
Nagolnoye is located 10 km northeast of Rovenki (the district's administrative centre) by road. Klimenkovo is the nearest rural locality.
