= Anpilovka =

Anpilovka Анпиловка
- Selo
- Location within Belgorod Oblast Location within Russia
- Coordinates: 51°15′N 39°02′E
- Country: Russia
- Region: Belgorod Oblast
- District: Starooskolsky District
- Time zone: UTC+3:00

Anpilovka (Russian: Анпиловка) is a rural locality (a selo) in Starooskolsky District, Belgorod Oblast, Russia. The population was 232 as of 2010. There are 4 streets.

== Geography ==
Anpilovka is located 14 km southeast of Stary Oskol (the district's administrative centre) by road. Neznamovo is the nearest rural locality.
