= Foshchevatovo =

Foshchevatovo Фощеватово
- Selo
- Location within Belgorod Oblast Location within Russia
- Coordinates: 50°25′N 38°03′E
- Country: Russia
- Region: Belgorod Oblast
- District: Volokonovsky District
- Time zone: UTC+3:00

Foshchevatovo (Russian: Фощеватово) is a rural locality (a selo) in Volokonovsky District, Belgorod Oblast, Russia. The population was 1,225 as of 2010. There are 15 streets.

== Geography ==
Foshchevatovo is located 18 km southeast of Volokonovka (the district's administrative centre) by road. Khmelevets is the nearest rural locality.
