= Dubino, Krasnoyaruzhsky District, Belgorod Oblast =

Dubino Дубино
- Settlement
- Location within Belgorod Oblast Location within Russia
- Coordinates: 50°50′N 35°40′E
- Country: Russia
- Region: Belgorod Oblast
- District: Krasnoyaruzhsky District
- Time zone: UTC+3:00

Dubino (Russian: Дубино) is a rural locality (a settlement) in Krasnoyaruzhsky District, Belgorod Oblast, Russia. The population was 5 as of 2010. There is one street.

== Geography ==
Dubino is located 6 km north of Krasnaya Yaruga (the district's administrative centre) by road. Krasnaya Yaruga is the nearest rural locality.
