= Grigoryevka, Volokonovsky District, Belgorod Oblast =

Grigoryevka Григорьевка
- Khutor
- Location within Belgorod Oblast Location within Russia
- Coordinates: 50°26′N 37°33′E
- Country: Russia
- Region: Belgorod Oblast
- District: Volokonovsky District
- Time zone: UTC+3:00

Grigoryevka (Russian: Григорьевка) is a rural locality (a khutor) in Volokonovsky District, Belgorod Oblast, Russia. The population was 10 as of 2010. There is one street.

== Geography ==
Grigoryevka is located 30 km west of Volokonovka (the district's administrative centre) by road. Krinichnoye is the nearest rural locality.
