= Batlukov =

Batlukov Батлуков
- Khutor
- Location within Belgorod Oblast Location within Russia
- Coordinates: 50°34′N 38°50′E
- Country: Russia
- Region: Belgorod Oblast
- District: Alexeyevsky District
- Time zone: UTC+3:00

Batlukov (Russian: Батлуков) is a rural locality (a khutor) in Alexeyevsky District, Belgorod Oblast, Russia. The population was 19 as of 2010. There is 1 street.

== Geography ==
Batlukov is located 14 km southeast of Alexeyevka (the district's administrative centre) by road. Matryono-Gezovo is the nearest rural locality.
