= Foshchevaty =

Foshchevaty Фощеватый
- Khutor
- Location within Belgorod Oblast Location within Russia
- Coordinates: 50°28′N 38°13′E
- Country: Russia
- Region: Belgorod Oblast
- District: Krasnogvardeysky District
- Time zone: UTC+3:00

Foshchevaty (Russian: Фощеватый) is a rural locality (a khutor) in Krasnogvardeysky District, Belgorod Oblast, Russia. The population was 52 as of 2010. There is 1 street.

== Geography ==
Foshchevaty is located 38 km (24 mi) southwest of Biryuch (the district's administrative centre) by road. Livenka is the nearest rural locality.
