= Plotvyanka =

Plotvyanka Плотвянка
- Khutor
- Location within Belgorod Oblast Location within Russia
- Coordinates: 50°21′N 37°34′E
- Country: Russia
- Region: Belgorod Oblast
- District: Volokonovsky District
- Time zone: UTC+3:00

Plotvyanka (Russian: Плотвянка) is a rural locality (a khutor) in Volokonovsky District, Belgorod Oblast, Russia. The population was 104 as of 2010. It has only one street.

== Geography ==
Plotvyanka is located 33 km southwest of Volokonovka (the district's administrative centre) by road. Novoye is the nearest rural locality.
