= Lutsenkovo =

Lutsenkovo Луценково
- Selo
- Location within Belgorod Oblast Location within Russia
- Coordinates: 50°28′N 38°57′E
- Country: Russia
- Region: Belgorod Oblast
- District: Alexeyevsky District
- Time zone: UTC+3:00

Lutsenkovo (Russian: Луцéнково) is a rural locality (a selo) and the administrative center of Lutsenkovskoye Rural Settlement, Alexeyevsky District, Belgorod Oblast, Russia. The population was 580 as of 2010. There are 5 streets.

== Geography ==
Lutsenkovo is located 37 km southeast of Alexeyevka (the district's administrative centre) by road. Babichev is the nearest rural locality.
