= Dvuluchnoye =

Dvuluchnoye Двулучное
- Selo
- Location within Belgorod Oblast Location within Russia
- Coordinates: 50°02′N 38°00′E
- Country: Russia
- Region: Belgorod Oblast
- District: Valuysky District
- Time zone: UTC+3:00

Dvuluchnoye (Russian: Двулучное) is a rural locality (a selo) and the administrative center of Dvuluchenskoye Rural Settlement, Valuysky District, Belgorod Oblast, Russia. The population was 1,430 as of 2010. There are 25 streets.

== Geography ==
Dvuluchnoye is located 25 km southwest of Valuyki (the district's administrative centre) by road. Berezhanka is the nearest rural locality.
