= Kalinin, Krasnensky District, Belgorod Oblast =

Kalinin Калинин
- Khutor
- Location within Belgorod Oblast Location within Russia
- Coordinates: 50°57′N 38°22′E
- Country: Russia
- Region: Belgorod Oblast
- District: Krasnensky District
- Time zone: UTC+3:00

Kalinin (Russian: Калинин) is a rural locality (a khutor) in Krasnensky District, Belgorod Oblast, Russia. The population was 23 as of 2010. There is 1 street.
