= Khlevishche =

Khlevishche Хлевище
- Selo
- Location within Belgorod Oblast Location within Russia
- Coordinates: 50°33′N 38°32′E
- Country: Russia
- Region: Belgorod Oblast
- District: Alexeyevsky District
- Time zone: UTC+3:00

Khlevishche (Russian: Хлевище) is a rural locality (a selo) and the administrative center of Khlevishchensky Rural Settlement, Alexeyevsky District, Belgorod Oblast, Russia. The population was 748 as of 2010. There are 14 streets.

== Geography ==
Khlevishche is located 20 km southwest of Alexeyevka (the district's administrative centre) by road. Solomakhin is the nearest rural locality.
