= Nina, Belgorod Oblast =

Nina Нина
- Khutor
- Location within Belgorod Oblast Location within Russia
- Coordinates: 50°30′N 37°41′E
- Country: Russia
- Region: Belgorod Oblast
- District: Volokonovsky District
- Time zone: UTC+3:00

Nina (Russian: Нина) is a rural locality (a khutor) in Volokonovsky District, Belgorod Oblast, Russia. The population was 60 as of 2010. There is 1 street.

== Geography ==
Nina is located 18 km northwest of Volokonovka (the district's administrative centre) by road. Chapelnoye is the nearest rural locality.
