= Oktyabrskaya Gotnya =

Oktyabrskaya Gotnya Октябрьская Готня
- Selo
- Location within Belgorod Oblast Location within Russia
- Coordinates: 50°39′N 35°53′E
- Country: Russia
- Region: Belgorod Oblast
- District: Borisovsky District
- Time zone: UTC+3:00

Oktyabrskaya Gotnya (Russian: Октябрьская Готня) is a rural locality (a selo) and the administrative center of Oktyabrsko-Gotnyanskoye Rural Settlement, Borisovsky District, Belgorod Oblast, Russia. The population was 334 as of 2010. There are 5 streets.

== Geography ==
Oktyabrskaya Gotnya is located 19 km northwest of Borisovka (the district's administrative centre) by road. Fedoseykin is the nearest rural locality.
