= Krivosheyevka =

Krivosheyevka Кривошеевка
- Selo
- Location within Belgorod Oblast Location within Russia
- Coordinates: 51°04′N 37°02′E
- Country: Russia
- Region: Belgorod Oblast
- District: Prokhorovsky District
- Time zone: UTC+3:00

Krivosheyevka (Russian: Кривошеевка) is a rural locality (a selo) and the administrative center of Krivosheyevskoye Rural Settlement, Prokhorovsky District, Belgorod Oblast, Russia. The population was 542 as of 2010. There are 5 streets.

== Geography ==
Krivosheyevka is located 24 km east of Prokhorovka (the district's administrative centre) by road. Raisovka is the nearest rural locality.
