= Matryono-Gezovo =

Matryono-Gezovo Матрёно-Гезово
- Selo
- Location within Belgorod Oblast Location within Russia
- Coordinates: 50°36′N 38°51′E
- Country: Russia
- Region: Belgorod Oblast
- District: Alexeyevsky District
- Time zone: UTC+3:00

Matryono-Gezovo (Russian: Матрёно-Гезово) is a rural locality (a selo) and the administrative center of Matryonogezovskoye Rural Settlement, Alexeyevsky District, Belgorod Oblast, Russia. The population was 882 as of 2010. There are 7 streets.

== Geography ==
Matryono-Gezovo is located 16 km east of Alexeyevka (the district's administrative centre) by road. Batlukov is the nearest rural locality.
