= Novokhutornoye =

Novokhutornoye Новохуторное
- Selo
- Location within Belgorod Oblast Location within Russia
- Coordinates: 50°33′N 38°11′E
- Country: Russia
- Region: Belgorod Oblast
- District: Krasnogvardeysky District
- Time zone: UTC+3:00

Novokhutornoye (Russian: Новохуторное) is a rural locality (a selo) and the administrative center of Novokhutornoye Rural Settlement, Krasnogvardeysky District, Belgorod Oblast, Russia. The population was 487 as of 2010. There are 3 streets.

== Geography ==
Novokhutornoye is located 21 km (13 mi) southwest of Biryuch (the district's administrative centre) by road. Gorovoye is the nearest rural locality.
