= Niva, Prokhorovsky District, Belgorod Oblast =

Niva Нива
- Khutor
- Location within Belgorod Oblast Location within Russia
- Coordinates: 51°02′N 36°48′E
- Country: Russia
- Region: Belgorod Oblast
- District: Prokhorovsky District
- Time zone: UTC+3:00

Niva (Russian: Нива) is a rural locality (a khutor) in Prokhorovsky District, Belgorod Oblast, Russia. The population was 10 as of 2010. There is 1 street.

== Geography ==
Niva is located 5 km east of Prokhorovka (the district's administrative centre) by road. Tikhaya Padina is the nearest rural locality.
