= Ognishchevo =

Ognishchevo Огнищево
- Selo
- Location within Belgorod Oblast Location within Russia
- Coordinates: 50°27′N 37°06′E
- Country: Russia
- Region: Belgorod Oblast
- District: Shebekinsky District
- Time zone: UTC+3:00

Ognishchevo (Russian: Огнищево) is a rural locality (a selo) in Shebekinsky District, Belgorod Oblast, Russia. The population was 27 as of 2010.

== Geography ==
Ognishchevo is located 25 km northeast of Shebekino (the district's administrative centre) by road. Starovshchina is the nearest rural locality.
