= Bubnovo =

Bubnovo Бубново
- Selo
- Location within Belgorod Oblast Location within Russia
- Coordinates: 50°50′N 37°31′E
- Country: Russia
- Region: Belgorod Oblast
- District: Korochansky District
- Time zone: UTC+3:00

Bubnovo (Russian: Бубново) is a rural locality (a selo) and the administrative center of Bubnovskoye Rural Settlement, Korochansky District, Belgorod Oblast, Russia. The population was 451 as of 2010. There are 7 streets.

== Geography ==
Bubnovo is located 27 km east of Korocha (the district's administrative centre) by road. Loznoye is the nearest rural locality.
