= Novaya Slobodka, Belgorod Oblast =

Novaya Slobodka Новая Слободка
- Selo
- Location within Belgorod Oblast Location within Russia
- Coordinates: 50°49′N 37°00′E
- Country: Russia
- Region: Belgorod Oblast
- District: Korochansky District
- Time zone: UTC+3:00

Novaya Slobodka (Russian: Новая Слободка) is a rural locality (a selo) and the administrative center of Novoslobodskoye Rural Settlement, Korochansky District, Belgorod Oblast, Russia. The population was 846 as of 2010. There are 10 streets.

== Geography ==
Novaya Slobodka is located 17 km west of Korocha (the district's administrative centre) by road. Merkulovka is the nearest rural locality.
