= Nikolayevka, Peschanskoye Rural Settlement, Starooskolsky District, Belgorod Oblast =

Nikolayevka Николаевка
- Selo
- Location within Belgorod Oblast Location within Russia
- Coordinates: 51°18′N 37°41′E
- Country: Russia
- Region: Belgorod Oblast
- District: Starooskolsky District
- Time zone: UTC+3:00

Nikolayevka (Russian: Николаевка) is a rural locality (a selo) in Starooskolsky District, Belgorod Oblast, Russia. The population was 176 as of 2010.
