= Zayachye =

Zayachye Заячье
- Selo
- Location within Belgorod Oblast Location within Russia
- Coordinates: 50°46′N 36°58′E
- Country: Russia
- Region: Belgorod Oblast
- District: Korochansky District
- Time zone: UTC+3:00

Zayachye (Russian: Заячье) is a rural locality (a selo) and the administrative center of Zayachenskoye Rural Settlement, Korochansky District, Belgorod Oblast, Russia. The population was 685 as of 2010. There are 14 streets.

== Geography ==
Zayachye is located 19 km (12 mi) southwest of Korocha (the district's administrative centre) by road. Khryashchevoye is the nearest rural locality.
