= Sagaydachnoye =

Sagaydachnoye Сагайдачное
- Selo
- Location within Belgorod Oblast Location within Russia
- Coordinates: 51°02′N 36°55′E
- Country: Russia
- Region: Belgorod Oblast
- District: Prokhorovsky District
- Time zone: UTC+3:00

Sagaydachnoye (Russian: Сагайдачное) is a rural locality (a selo) in Prokhorovsky District, Belgorod Oblast, Russia. The population was 279 as of 2010. There are 3 streets.

== Geography ==
Sagaydachnoye is located 14 km east of Prokhorovka (the district's administrative centre) by road. Bobrovo is the nearest rural locality.
