= Trostenets, Belgorod Oblast =

Trostenets Тростенец
- Selo
- Location within Belgorod Oblast Location within Russia
- Coordinates: 50°50′N 37°39′E
- Country: Russia
- Region: Belgorod Oblast
- District: Novooskolsky District
- Time zone: UTC+3:00

Trostenets (Russian: Тростенец) is a rural locality (a selo) and the administrative center of Trostenetskoye Rural Settlement, Novooskolsky District, Belgorod Oblast, Russia. The population was 845 as of 2010. There are 15 streets.

== Geography ==
Trostenets is located 24 km northwest of Novy Oskol (the district's administrative centre) by road. Kiselevka is the nearest rural locality.
