= Klimenki =

Klimenki Клименки
- Selo
- Location within Belgorod Oblast Location within Russia
- Coordinates: 50°03′N 38°22′E
- Country: Russia
- Region: Belgorod Oblast
- District: Veydelevsky District
- Time zone: UTC+3:00

Klimenki (Russian: Клименки) is a rural locality (a selo) and the administrative center of Klimenkovskoye Rural Settlement, Veydelevsky District, Belgorod Oblast, Russia. The population was 741 as of 2010. There are 4 streets.

== Geography ==
Klimenki is located 20 km southwest of Veydelevka (the district's administrative centre) by road. Yaropoltsy is the nearest rural locality.
