= Novokladovoye =

Novokladovoye Новокладовое
- Selo
- Location within Belgorod Oblast Location within Russia
- Coordinates: 51°23′N 37°55′E
- Country: Russia
- Region: Belgorod Oblast
- District: Starooskolsky District
- Time zone: UTC+3:00

Novokladovoye (Russian: Новокладовое) is a rural locality (a selo) in Starooskolsky District, Belgorod Oblast, Russia. The population was 452 as of 2010. There are 44 streets.

== Geography ==
Novokladovoye is located 17 km north of Stary Oskol (the district's administrative centre) by road. Nabokino is the nearest rural locality.
