= Nagorye =

Nagorye Нагорье
- Settlement
- Location within Belgorod Oblast Location within Russia
- Coordinates: 50°02′N 39°04′E
- Country: Russia
- Region: Belgorod Oblast
- District: Rovensky District
- Time zone: UTC+3:00

Nagorye (Russian: Нагорье) is a rural locality (a settlement) and the administrative center of Nagoryevskoye Rural Settlement, Rovensky District, Belgorod Oblast, Russia. The population was 848 as of 2010. There are 14 streets.

== Geography ==
Nagorye is located 20 km northeast of Rovenki (the district's administrative centre) by road. Solontsy is the nearest rural locality.
