= Chuzhikovo =

Chuzhikovo Чужиково
- Selo
- Location within Belgorod Oblast Location within Russia
- Coordinates: 51°12′N 38°07′E
- Country: Russia
- Region: Belgorod Oblast
- District: Starooskolsky District
- Time zone: UTC+3:00

Chuzhikovo (Russian: Чужиково) is a rural locality (a selo) in Starooskolsky District, Belgorod Oblast, Russia. The population was 243 as of 2010. There are 7 streets.

== Geography ==
Chuzhikovo is located 30 km southeast of Stary Oskol (the district's administrative centre) by road. Dmitriyevka is the nearest rural locality.
