= Lapygino =

Lapygino Лапыгино
- Selo
- Location within Belgorod Oblast Location within Russia
- Coordinates: 51°21′N 37°57′E
- Country: Russia
- Region: Belgorod Oblast
- District: Starooskolsky District
- Time zone: UTC+3:00

Lapygino (Russian: Лапыгино) is a rural locality (a selo) and the administrative center of Lapyginsky Selsoviet, Starooskolsky District, Belgorod Oblast, Russia. The population was 872 as of 2010. There are 48 streets.

== Geography ==
Lapygino is located 13 km northeast of Stary Oskol (the district's administrative centre) by road. Kurskoye is the nearest rural locality.
