= Korotkoye =

Korotkoye Короткое
- Selo
- Location within Belgorod Oblast Location within Russia
- Coordinates: 50°53′N 37°16′E
- Country: Russia
- Region: Belgorod Oblast
- District: Korochansky District
- Time zone: UTC+3:00

Korotkoye (Russian: Короткое) is a rural locality (a selo) in Korochansky District, Belgorod Oblast, Russia. The population was 610 as of 2010. There are 5 streets.

== Geography ==
Korotkoye is located 12 km north of Korocha (the district's administrative centre) by road. Krivoy is the nearest rural locality.
