= Plotavets =

Plotavets Плотавец
- Selo
- Location within Belgorod Oblast Location within Russia
- Coordinates: 50°54′N 37°12′E
- Country: Russia
- Region: Belgorod Oblast
- District: Korochansky District
- Time zone: UTC+3:00

Plotavets (Russian: Плотавец) is a rural locality (a selo) and the administrative center of Plotavskoye Rural Settlement, Korochansky District, Belgorod Oblast, Russia. The population was 449 as of 2010. There are 5 streets.

== Geography ==
Plotavets is located 14 km north of Korocha (the district's administrative centre) by road. Shlyakh is the nearest rural locality.
