= Baytsury =

Baytsury Байцуры
- Selo
- Location within Belgorod Oblast Location within Russia
- Coordinates: 50°31′N 36°04′E
- Country: Russia
- Region: Belgorod Oblast
- District: Borisovsky District
- Time zone: UTC+3:00

Baytsury (Russian: Байцуры) is a rural locality (a selo) in Borisovsky District, Belgorod Oblast, Russia. The population was 363 as of 2010. There are 6 streets.

== Geography ==
Baytsury is located 18 km southeast of Borisovka (the district's administrative centre) by road. Novoalexandrovka is the nearest rural locality.
