= Varvarovka, Alexeyevsky District, Belgorod Oblast =

Varvarovka Варваровка
- Selo
- Location within Belgorod Oblast Location within Russia
- Coordinates: 50°22′32″N 38°49′58″E
- Country: Russia
- Region: Belgorod Oblast
- District: Alexeyevsky District
- Time zone: UTC+3:00

Varvarovka (Russian: Варваровка) is a rural locality (a selo) and the administrative center of Varvarovskoye Rural Settlement, Alexeyevsky District, Belgorod Oblast, Russia. The population was 665 as of 2010. There are 6 streets.

== Geography ==
Varvarovka is located 35 km southeast of Alexeyevka (the district's administrative centre) by road. Krasnoye is the nearest rural locality.
