= Filippovo, Belgorod Oblast =

Filippovo Филиппово
- Selo
- Location within Belgorod Oblast Location within Russia
- Coordinates: 50°21′N 38°08′E
- Country: Russia
- Region: Belgorod Oblast
- District: Valuysky District
- Time zone: UTC+3:00

Filippovo (Russian: Филиппово) is a rural locality (a selo) in Valuysky District, Belgorod Oblast, Russia. The population was 81 as of 2010. There are 2 streets.

== Geography ==
Filippovo is located 28 km north of Valuyki (the district's administrative centre) by road. Verkhny Moisey is the nearest rural locality.
