= Zmeyevka =

Zmeyevka Змеевка
- Khutor
- Location within Belgorod Oblast Location within Russia
- Coordinates: 51°06′N 38°11′E
- Country: Russia
- Region: Belgorod Oblast
- District: Starooskolsky District
- Time zone: UTC+3:00

Zmeyevka (Russian: Змеевка) is a rural locality (a khutor) in Starooskolsky District, Belgorod Oblast, Russia. The population was 94 as of 2010. There are 6 streets.

== Geography ==
Zmeyevka is located 47 km southeast of Stary Oskol (the district's administrative centre) by road. Glushkovka and Krutoye are the nearest rural localities.
