= Mospanov =

Mospanov Мосьпанов
- Khutor
- Location within Belgorod Oblast Location within Russia
- Coordinates: 50°51′N 38°12′E
- Country: Russia
- Region: Belgorod Oblast
- District: Novooskolsky District
- Time zone: UTC+3:00

Mospanov (Russian: Мосьпанов) is a rural locality (a khutor) in Novooskolsky District, Belgorod Oblast, Russia. The population was 301 as of 2010. There are 3 streets.

== Geography ==
Mospanov is located 32 km northeast of Novy Oskol (the district's administrative centre) by road. Bolshaya Ivanovka is the nearest rural locality.
