= Nizhniye Lubyanki =

Nizhniye Lubyanki Нижние Лубянки
- Selo
- Location within Belgorod Oblast Location within Russia
- Coordinates: 50°27′N 37°49′E
- Country: Russia
- Region: Belgorod Oblast
- District: Volokonovsky District
- Time zone: UTC+3:00

Nizhniye Lubyanki (Russian: Нижние Лубянки) is a rural locality (a selo) in Volokonovsky District, Belgorod Oblast, Russia. The population was 619 as of 2010. There are 5 streets.

== Geography ==
Nizhniye Lubyanki is located 5 km southwest of Volokonovka (the district's administrative centre) by road. Volokonovka is the nearest rural locality.
