= Sokolovka, Korochansky District, Belgorod Oblast =

Sokolovka Соколовка
- Selo
- Location within Belgorod Oblast Location within Russia
- Coordinates: 50°43′N 37°16′E
- Country: Russia
- Region: Belgorod Oblast
- District: Korochansky District
- Time zone: UTC+3:00

Sokolovka (Russian: Соколовка) is a rural locality (a selo) and the administrative center of Sokolovskoye Rural Settlement, Korochansky District, Belgorod Oblast, Russia. The population was 411 as of 2010. There are 6 streets.

== Geography ==
Sokolovka is located 19 km southeast of Korocha (the district's administrative centre) by road. Ivitsa is the nearest rural locality.
