= Valuychik =

Valuychik Валуйчик
- Selo
- Location within Belgorod Oblast Location within Russia
- Coordinates: 50°22′N 38°15′E
- Country: Russia
- Region: Belgorod Oblast
- District: Krasnogvardeysky District
- Time zone: UTC+3:00

Valuychik (Russian: Валуйчик) is a rural locality (a selo) and the administrative center of Valuychanskoye Rural Settlement, Krasnogvardeysky District, Belgorod Oblast, Russia. The population was 698 as of 2010. There are 4 streets.

== Geography ==
Valuychik is located 41 km (25 mi) southwest of Biryuch (the district's administrative centre) by road. Starokozhevo is the nearest rural locality.
