= Svistovka, Rovensky District, Belgorod Oblast =

Svistovka Свистовка
- Selo
- Location within Belgorod Oblast Location within Russia
- Coordinates: 50°05′N 38°57′E
- Country: Russia
- Region: Belgorod Oblast
- District: Rovensky District
- Time zone: UTC+3:00

Svistovka (Russian: Свистовка) is a rural locality (a selo) and the administrative center of Svistovskoye Rural Settlement, Rovensky District, Belgorod Oblast, Russia. The population was 582 as of 2010. There are 4 streets.

== Geography ==
Svistovka is located 24 km north of Rovenki (the district's administrative centre) by road. Yaseny is the nearest rural locality.
