= Karnaukhovka =

Karnaukhovka Карнауховка
- Selo
- Location within Belgorod Oblast Location within Russia
- Coordinates: 50°27′N 36°42′E
- Country: Russia
- Region: Belgorod Oblast
- District: Belgorodsky District
- Time zone: UTC+3:00

Karnaukhovka (Russian: Карнауховка) is a rural locality (a selo) in Belgorodsky District, Belgorod Oblast, Russia. The population was 94 as of 2010. There are 3 streets.

== Geography ==
Karnaukhovka is located in 38 km southeast of Maysky (the district's administrative centre). Maslova Pristan is the nearest rural locality.
