= Kustovoye =

Kustovoye Кустовое
- Selo
- Location within Belgorod Oblast Location within Russia
- Coordinates: 50°39′N 36°10′E
- Country: Russia
- Region: Belgorod Oblast
- District: Yakovlevsky District
- Time zone: UTC+3:00

Kustovoye (Russian: Кустовое) is a rural locality (a selo) and the administrative center of Kustovskoye Rural Settlement, Yakovlevsky District, Belgorod Oblast, Russia. The population was 1,679 as of 2010. There are 8 streets.

== Geography ==
Kustovoye is located 33 km southwest of Stroitel (the district's administrative centre) by road. Seretino is the nearest rural locality.
