= Shelayevo =

Shelayevo Шелаево
- Selo
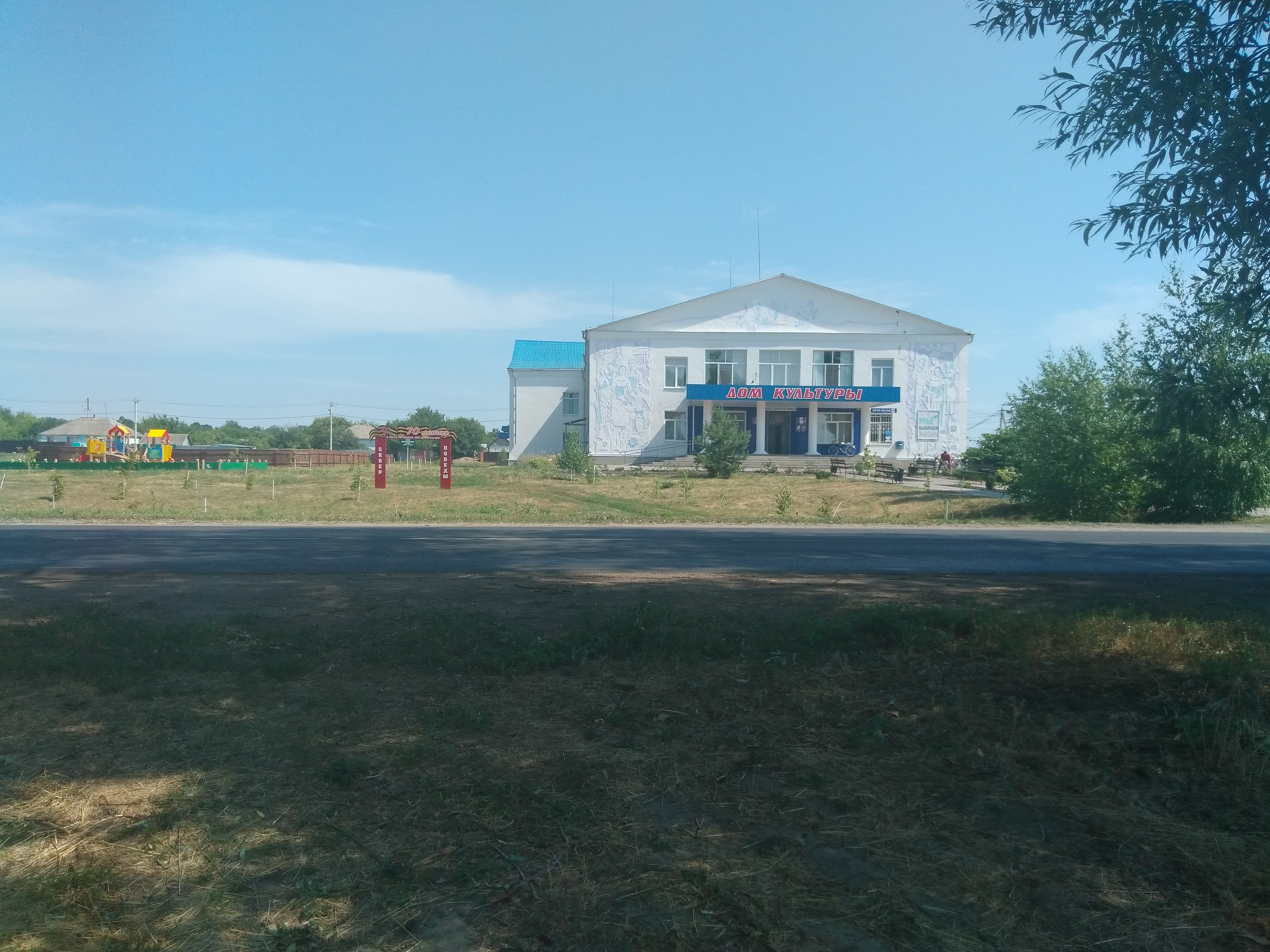

- Location within Belgorod Oblast Location within Russia
- Coordinates: 50°07′N 38°04′E
- Country: Russia
- Region: Belgorod Oblast
- District: Valuysky District
- Time zone: UTC+3:00

Shelayevo (Russian: Шелаево) is a rural locality (a selo) and the administrative center of Shelayevskoye Rural Settlement, Valuysky District, Belgorod Oblast, Russia. The population was 2,233 as of 2010. There are 15 streets.

== Geography ==
Shelayevo is located 12 km south of Valuyki (the district's administrative centre) by road. Kolykhalino is the nearest rural locality.
