= Dronovka =

Dronovka Дроновка
- Village
- Location within Belgorod Oblast Location within Russia
- Coordinates: 50°38′N 35°25′E
- Country: Russia
- Region: Belgorod Oblast
- District: Grayvoronsky District
- Time zone: UTC+3:00

Dronovka (Russian: Дроновка) is a rural locality (a village) in Grayvoronsky District, Belgorod Oblast, Russia. The population was 167 as of 2010. There are 5 streets.

== Geography ==
Dronovka is located 29 km northwest of Grayvoron (the district's administrative centre) by road. Smorodino is the nearest rural locality.
