= Bekhteyevka =

Bekhteyevka Бехтеевка
- Selo
- Location within Belgorod Oblast Location within Russia
- Coordinates: 50°48′N 37°12′E
- Country: Russia
- Region: Belgorod Oblast
- District: Korochansky District
- Time zone: UTC+3:00

Bekhteyevka (Russian: Бехтеевка) is a rural locality (a selo) and the administrative center of Bekhteyevskoye Rural Settlement, Korochansky District, Belgorod Oblast, Russia. Population: 3,259 (2021 census); 3,290 (2010 census). There are 23 streets.

== Geography ==
Bekhteyevka is located 2 km southeast of Korocha (the district's administrative centre) by road. Kazanka is the nearest rural locality.

== History ==
The settlement was founded in 1638 as one of three slobodas that made up the town of Korocha, itself built as a defensive fortress against Crimean and Nogai Tatar raids. Its residents historically worked in agriculture and trade. A three-altar Znamenskaya Church opened in the settlement in 1868 but was dismantled during World War II for building materials. By 1932, the settlement had 4,346 residents across six hamlets; a collective farm formed in 1959 was awarded the Order of the Red Banner of Labour in 1971.
