= Studeny Kolodets =

Studeny Kolodets Студеный Колодец
- Selo
- Location within Belgorod Oblast Location within Russia
- Coordinates: 50°47′N 38°50′E
- Country: Russia
- Region: Belgorod Oblast
- District: Alexeyevsky District
- Time zone: UTC+3:00

Studeny Kolodets (Russian: Студеный Колодец) is a rural locality (a selo) in Alexeyevsky District, Belgorod Oblast, Russia. The population was 211 as of 2010. There are 2 streets.

== Geography ==
Studeny Kolodets is located 27 km northeast of Alexeyevka (the district's administrative centre) by road. Repenka is the nearest rural locality.
