= Pytochny =

Pytochny Пыточный
- Khutor
- Location within Belgorod Oblast Location within Russia
- Coordinates: 50°28′N 37°58′E
- Country: Russia
- Region: Belgorod Oblast
- District: Volokonovsky District
- Time zone: UTC+3:00

Pytochny (Russian: Пыточный) is a rural locality (a khutor) in Volokonovsky District, Belgorod Oblast, Russia. The population was 9 as of 2010. There is 1 street.

== Geography ==
Pytochny is located 14 km east of Volokonovka (the district's administrative centre) by road. Krasnaya Niva is the nearest rural locality.
