= Seymitsa =

Seymitsa Сеймица
- Selo
- Location within Belgorod Oblast Location within Russia
- Coordinates: 51°09′N 36°52′E
- Country: Russia
- Region: Belgorod Oblast
- District: Prokhorovsky District
- Time zone: UTC+3:00

Seymitsa (Russian: Сеймица) is a rural locality (a selo) in Prokhorovsky District, Belgorod Oblast, Russia. The population was 210 as of 2010. There are 2 streets.

== Geography ==
Seymitsa is located 25 km northeast of Prokhorovka (the district's administrative centre) by road. Khimichev is the nearest rural locality.
