= Petrovka, Prokhorovsky District, Belgorod Oblast =

Petrovka Петровка
- Selo
- Location within Belgorod Oblast Location within Russia
- Coordinates: 51°07′N 36°55′E
- Country: Russia
- Region: Belgorod Oblast
- District: Prokhorovsky District
- Time zone: UTC+3:00

Petrovka (Russian: Петровка) is a rural locality (a selo) and the administrative center of Petrovskoye Rural Settlement, Prokhorovsky District, Belgorod Oblast, Russia. The population was 160 as of 2010. There is 1 street.

== Geography ==
Petrovka is located 26 km northeast of Prokhorovka (the district's administrative centre) by road. Radkovka is the nearest rural locality.
