= Bershakovo =

Bershakovo Бершаково
- Selo
- Location within Belgorod Oblast Location within Russia
- Coordinates: 50°32′N 37°25′E
- Country: Russia
- Region: Belgorod Oblast
- District: Shebekinsky District
- Time zone: UTC+3:00

Bershakovo (Russian: Бершаково) is a rural locality (a selo) and the administrative center of Bershakovskoye Rural Settlement, Shebekinsky District, Belgorod Oblast, Russia. The population was 546 as of 2010. There is 1 street.

== Geography ==
Bershakovo is located 49 km northeast of Shebekino (the district's administrative centre) by road. Popovka is the nearest rural locality.
