= Sredniye Lubyanki =

Sredniye Lubyanki Средние Лубянки
- Selo
- Location within Belgorod Oblast Location within Russia
- Coordinates: 50°26′N 37°49′E
- Country: Russia
- Region: Belgorod Oblast
- District: Volokonovsky District
- Time zone: UTC+3:00

Sredniye Lubyanki (Russian: Средние Лубянки) is a rural locality (a selo) in Volokonovsky District, Belgorod Oblast, Russia. The population was 211 as of 2010. There are 6 streets.

== Geography ==
Sredniye Lubyanki is located 8 km southwest of Volokonovka (the district's administrative centre) by road. Pyatnitskoye is the nearest rural locality.
