= Nemenushchy =

Nemenushchy Неменущий
- Khutor
- Location within Belgorod Oblast Location within Russia
- Coordinates: 50°32′N 38°54′E
- Country: Russia
- Region: Belgorod Oblast
- District: Alexeyevsky District
- Time zone: UTC+3:00

Nemenushchy (Russian: Неменущий) is a rural locality (a khutor) in Alexeyevsky District, Belgorod Oblast, Russia. The population was 147 as of 2010. There are 2 streets.

== Geography ==
Nemenushchy is located 21 km southeast of Alexeyevka (the district's administrative centre) by road. Bozhkovo is the nearest rural locality.
