= Pyshnograyev =

Pyshnograyev Пышнограев
- Khutor
- Location within Belgorod Oblast Location within Russia
- Coordinates: 50°30′N 38°49′E
- Country: Russia
- Region: Belgorod Oblast
- District: Alexeyevsky District
- Time zone: UTC+3:00

Pyshnograyev (Russian: Пышнограев) is a rural locality (a khutor) in Alexeyevsky District, Belgorod Oblast, Russia. The population was 8 as of 2010.

== Geography ==
Pyshnograyev is located 23 km southeast of Alexeyevka (the district's administrative centre) by road. Alexeyenkovo is the nearest rural locality.
