= Solomakhin =

Solomakhin Соломахин
- Khutor
- Location within Belgorod Oblast Location within Russia
- Coordinates: 50°34′N 38°31′E
- Country: Russia
- Region: Belgorod Oblast
- District: Alexeyevsky District
- Time zone: UTC+3:00

Solomakhin (Russian: Соломахин) is a rural locality (a khutor) in Alexeyevsky District, Belgorod Oblast, Russia. The population was 9 as of 2010. There is 1 street.

== Geography ==
Solomakhin is located 24 km southwest of Alexeyevka (the district's administrative centre) by road. Yendovitsky is the nearest rural locality.
