= Abalmasov =

Abalmasov Абалмасов
- Khutor
- Location within Belgorod Oblast Location within Russia
- Coordinates: 50°34′N 37°39′E
- Country: Russia
- Region: Belgorod Oblast
- District: Volokonovsky District
- Time zone: UTC+3:00

Abalmasov (Russian: Абалмасов) is a rural locality (a khutor) in Volokonovsky District, Belgorod Oblast, Russia. The population was 11 as of 2010. There is 1 street.

== Geography ==
Abalmasov is located 29 km northwest of Volokonovka (the district's administrative centre) by road. Tolmachev is the nearest rural locality.
