= Smorodino, Yakovlevsky District, Belgorod Oblast =

Smorodino Смородино
- Selo
- Location within Belgorod Oblast Location within Russia
- Coordinates: 50°48′N 36°32′E
- Country: Russia
- Region: Belgorod Oblast
- District: Yakovlevsky District
- Time zone: UTC+3:00

Smorodino (Russian: Смородино) is a rural locality (a selo) and the administrative center of Smorodinskoye Rural Settlement, Yakovlevsky District, Belgorod Oblast, Russia. The population was 517 as of 2010. There are 10 streets.

== Geography ==
Smorodino is located 7 km northeast of Stroitel (the district's administrative centre) by road. Kamensky is the nearest rural locality.
