= Sadki, Belgorod Oblast =

Sadki Садки
- Selo
- Location within Belgorod Oblast Location within Russia
- Coordinates: 50°38′N 38°18′E
- Country: Russia
- Region: Belgorod Oblast
- District: Krasnogvardeysky District
- Time zone: UTC+3:00

Sadki (Russian: Садки) is a rural locality (a selo) in Krasnogvardeysky District, Belgorod Oblast, Russia. The population was 180 as of 2010. There are 2 streets.

== Geography ==
Sadki is located 7 km (4.3 mi) west of Biryuch (the district's administrative centre) by road. Biryuch is the nearest rural locality.
