= Konovalovo =

Rural locality in Belgorod Oblast, Russia

Konovalovo Коновалово
- Selo
- Location within Belgorod Oblast Location within Russia
- Coordinates: 50°18′20″N 37°41′44″E
- Country: Russia
- Region: Belgorod Oblast
- District: Volokonovsky District
- Time zone: UTC+3:00

Konovalovo (Russian: Коновалово) is a rural locality (a selo) in Volokonovsky District, Belgorod Oblast, Russia. The population was 236 as of 2010. There are 4 streets.

== Geography ==
Konovalovo is located 30 km southwest of Volokonovka (the district's administrative centre) by road. Plotovka is the nearest rural locality.
