= Kolomytsevo, Prokhorovsky District, Belgorod Oblast =

Kolomytsevo Коломыцево
- Selo
- Location within Belgorod Oblast Location within European Russia Location within Russia
- Coordinates: 50°56′N 37°06′E
- Country: Russia
- Region: Belgorod Oblast
- District: Prokhorovsky District
- Time zone: UTC+3:00

Kolomytsevo (Russian: Коломыцево) is a rural locality (a selo) and the administrative center of Kolomytsevskoye Rural Settlement, Prokhorovsky District, Belgorod Oblast, Russia. The population was 333 as of 2010. There are 6 streets.

== Geography ==
Kolomytsevo is located 34 km southeast of Prokhorovka (the district's administrative centre) by road. Novoselovka is the nearest rural locality.
