= Bolshiye Lipyagi =

Bolshiye Lipyagi Большие Липяги
- Selo
- Location within Belgorod Oblast Location within Russia
- Coordinates: 50°12′N 38°25′E
- Country: Russia
- Region: Belgorod Oblast
- District: Veydelevsky District
- Time zone: UTC+3:00

Bolshiye Lipyagi (Russian: Большие Липяги) is a rural locality (a selo) and the administrative center of Bolshelipyagovsky Rural Settlement, Veydelevsky District, Belgorod Oblast, Russia. The population was 608 as of 2010. There are 6 streets.

== Geography ==
Bolshiye Lipyagi is located 10 km north of Veydelevka (the district's administrative centre) by road. Gapleyevka is the nearest rural locality.
