= Klimov, Belgorod Oblast =

Klimov Климов
- Khutor
- Location within Belgorod Oblast Location within Russia
- Coordinates: 50°26′N 38°34′E
- Country: Russia
- Region: Belgorod Oblast
- District: Alexeyevsky District
- Time zone: UTC+3:00

Klimov (Russian: Климов) is a rural locality (a khutor) in Alexeyevsky District, Belgorod Oblast, Russia. The population was 173 as of 2010. There is 1 street.

== Geography ==
Klimov is located 30 km southwest of Alexeyevka (the district's administrative centre) by road. Khreshchaty is the nearest rural locality.
