= Novodevichy, Belgorod Oblast =

Novodevichy Новодевичий
- Khutor
- Location within Belgorod Oblast Location within Russia
- Coordinates: 50°29′N 37°35′E
- Country: Russia
- Region: Belgorod Oblast
- District: Volokonovsky District
- Time zone: UTC+3:00

Novodevichy (Russian: Новодевичий) is a rural locality (a khutor) in Volokonovsky District, Belgorod Oblast, Russia. The population was 35 as of 2010. There is 1 street.

== Geography ==
Novodevichy is located 24 km west of Volokonovka (the district's administrative centre) by road. Volchya Alexandrovka is the nearest rural locality.
