= Kupriyanov, Belgorod Oblast =

Kupriyanov Куприянов
- Khutor
- Location within Belgorod Oblast Location within Russia
- Coordinates: 50°31′N 38°30′E
- Country: Russia
- Region: Belgorod Oblast
- District: Alexeyevsky District
- Time zone: UTC+3:00

Kupriyanov (Russian: Куприянов) is a rural locality (a khutor) in Alexeyevsky District, Belgorod Oblast, Russia. The population was 68 as of 2010. There is 1 street.

== Geography ==
Kupriyanov is located 27 km southwest of Alexeyevka (the district's administrative centre) by road. Popasnoye is the nearest rural locality.
