= Dudchin =

Dudchin Дудчин
- Selo
- Location within Belgorod Oblast Location within Russia
- Coordinates: 50°29′N 38°46′E
- Country: Russia
- Region: Belgorod Oblast
- District: Alexeyevsky District
- Time zone: UTC+3:00

Dudchin (Russian: Дудчин) is a rural locality (a selo) and the administrative center of Glukhovskoye Rural Settlement, Alexeyevsky District, Belgorod Oblast, Russia. The population was 5 as of 2010. There is 1 street.

== Geography ==
Dudchin is located 19 km southeast of Alexeyevka (the district's administrative centre) by road. Pyshnograyev is the nearest rural locality.
