= Dalneye Chesnochnoye =

Dalneye Chesnochnoye Дальнее Чесночное
- Selo
- Location within Belgorod Oblast Location within Russia
- Coordinates: 50°40′N 38°49′E
- Country: Russia
- Region: Belgorod Oblast
- District: Alexeyevsky District
- Time zone: UTC+3:00

Dalneye Chesnochnoye (Russian: Дальнее Чесночное) is a rural locality (a selo) in Alexeyevsky District, Belgorod Oblast, Russia. The population was 131 as of 2010. There are 7 streets.

== Geography ==
Dalneye Chesnochnoye is located 12 km northeast of Alexeyevka (the district's administrative centre) by road. Blizhneye Chesnochnoye is the nearest rural locality.
