= Menyaylovo =

Menyaylovo Меняйлово
- Selo
- Location within Belgorod Oblast Location within Russia
- Coordinates: 50°31′N 38°45′E
- Country: Russia
- Region: Belgorod Oblast
- District: Alexeyevsky District
- Time zone: UTC+3:00

Menyaylovo (Russian: Меняйлово) is a rural locality (a selo) and the administrative center of Menyaylovskoye Rural Settlement, Alexeyevsky District, Belgorod Oblast, Russia. The population was 424 as of 2010. There are 10 streets.

== Geography ==
Menyaylovo is located 14 km south of Alexeyevka (the district's administrative centre) by road. Shaposhnikov is the nearest rural locality.
