= Verkhnyaya Pokrovka =

Verkhnyaya Pokrovka Верхняя Покровка
- Selo
- Location within Belgorod Oblast Location within Russia
- Coordinates: 50°47′N 38°26′E
- Country: Russia
- Region: Belgorod Oblast
- District: Krasnogvardeysky District
- Time zone: UTC+3:00

Verkhnyaya Pokrovka (Russian: Верхняя Покровка) is a rural locality (a selo) and the administrative center of Verkhnepokrovskoye Rural Settlement, Krasnogvardeysky District, Belgorod Oblast, Russia. The population was 575 as of 2010. There are 3 streets.

== Geography ==
Verkhnyaya Pokrovka is located 25 km (16 mi) north of Biryuch (the district's administrative centre) by road. Chermenevka is the nearest rural locality.
