= Lutovinovo =

Lutovinovo Лутовиново
- Selo
- Location within Belgorod Oblast Location within Russia
- Coordinates: 50°34′N 37°57′E
- Country: Russia
- Region: Belgorod Oblast
- District: Volokonovsky District
- Time zone: UTC+3:00

Lutovinovo (Russian: Лутовиново) is a rural locality (a selo) in Volokonovsky District, Belgorod Oblast, Russia. The population was 162 as of 2010. There are 5 streets.

== Geography ==
Lutovinovo is situated 17 km northeast of Volokonovka, the administrative center of the district, accessible by road. The nearest rural locality is Repyevka.
