= Zelyonaya Polyana, Belgorod Oblast =

Zelyonaya Polyana Зелёная Поляна
- Selo
- Location within Belgorod Oblast Location within Russia
- Coordinates: 50°38′N 36°37′E
- Country: Russia
- Region: Belgorod Oblast
- District: Belgorodsky District
- Time zone: UTC+3:00

Zelyonaya Polyana (Russian: Зелёная Поляна) is a rural locality (a selo) in Belgorodsky District, Belgorod Oblast, Russia. The population was 1,276 as of 2010. There are 44 streets.
