= Maryevka, Belgorod Oblast =

Maryevka Марьевка
- Selo
- Location within Belgorod Oblast Location within Russia
- Coordinates: 50°43′N 38°22′E
- Country: Russia
- Region: Belgorod Oblast
- District: Krasnogvardeysky District
- Time zone: UTC+3:00

Maryevka (Russian: Марьевка) is a rural locality (a selo) and the administrative center of Maryevskoye Rural Settlement, Krasnogvardeysky District, Belgorod Oblast, Russia. The population was 526 as of 2010. There are 4 streets.

== Geography ==
Maryevka is located 20 km (12 mi) north of Biryuch (the district's administrative centre) by road. Repenka is the nearest rural locality.
