= Priolskoye =

Priolskoye Приосколье
- Selo
- Location within Belgorod Oblast Location within Russia
- Coordinates: 51°05′N 37°50′E
- Country: Russia
- Region: Belgorod Oblast
- District: Starooskolsky District
- Time zone: UTC+3:00

Priolskoye (Russian: Приосколье) is a rural locality (a selo) in Starooskolsky District, Belgorod Oblast, Russia. The population was 183 as of 2010. There are 4 streets.

== Geography ==
Priolskoye is located 33 km south of Stary Oskol (the district's administrative centre) by road. Nikolayevka is the nearest rural locality.
