= Pogrebitsky =

Pogrebitsky Погребицкий
- Khutor
- Location within Belgorod Oblast Location within Russia
- Coordinates: 50°20′N 38°35′E
- Country: Russia
- Region: Belgorod Oblast
- District: Veydelevsky District
- Time zone: UTC+3:00

Pogrebitsky (Russian: Погребицкий) is a rural locality (a khutor) in Veydelevsky District, Belgorod Oblast, Russia. The population was 741 as of 2010.

== Geography ==
Pogrebitsky is located 41 kilometres (25 mi) northeast of Veydelevka (the district's administrative centre) by road. Lugovoye is the nearest rural locality.
