= Dunayka =

Dunayka Дунайка
- Selo
- Location within Belgorod Oblast Location within Russia
- Coordinates: 50°32′N 35°32′E
- Country: Russia
- Region: Belgorod Oblast
- District: Grayvoronsky District
- Time zone: UTC+3:00

Dunayka (Russian: Дунайка) is a rural locality (a selo) and the administrative center of Dunaysky Rural Settlement, Grayvoronsky District, Belgorod Oblast, Russia. The population was 527 as of 2010. There are 13 streets.

== Geography ==
Dunayka is located 14 km northwest of Grayvoron (the district's administrative centre) by road. Moshchenoye is the nearest rural locality.
