= Plota, Starooskolsky District, Belgorod Oblast =

Plota Плота
- Selo
- Location within Belgorod Oblast Location within Russia
- Coordinates: 51°07′N 38°16′E
- Country: Russia
- Region: Belgorod Oblast
- District: Starooskolsky District
- Time zone: UTC+3:00

Plota (Russian: Плота) is a rural locality (a selo) in Starooskolsky District, Belgorod Oblast, Russia. The population was 71 as of 2010. There are 2 streets.

== Geography ==
Plota is located 49 km southeast of Stary Oskol (the district's administrative centre) by road. Zmeyevka is the nearest rural locality.
