= Veliky Perevoz =

Veliky Perevoz Великий Перевоз
- Selo
- Location within Belgorod Oblast Location within Russia
- Coordinates: 51°10′N 37°52′E
- Country: Russia
- Region: Belgorod Oblast
- District: Starooskolsky District
- Time zone: UTC+3:00

Veliky Perevoz (Russian: Великий Перевоз) is a rural locality (a selo) in Starooskolsky District, Belgorod Oblast, Russia. The population was 45 as of 2010. There are 3 streets.

== Geography ==
Veliky Perevoz is located 18 km south of Stary Oskol (the district's administrative centre) by road. Sumarokov is the nearest rural locality.
