= Krasny Vyselok =

Krasny Vyselok Красный Выселок
- Settlement
- Location within Belgorod Oblast Location within Russia
- Coordinates: 50°57′N 37°46′E
- Country: Russia
- Region: Belgorod Oblast
- District: Chernyansky District
- Time zone: UTC+3:00

Krasny Vyselok (Russian: Красный Выселок) is a rural locality (a settlement) in Chernyansky District, Belgorod Oblast, Russia. The population was 50 as of 2010. There is 1 street.

== Geography ==
Krasny Vyselok is located 7 km northwest of Chernyanka (the district's administrative centre) by road. Krasny Ostrov is the nearest rural locality.
