= Lesnoye Ukolovo =

Lesnoye Ukolovo Лесное Уколово
- Selo
- Location within Belgorod Oblast Location within Russia
- Coordinates: 50°54′N 38°49′E
- Country: Russia
- Region: Belgorod Oblast
- District: Krasnensky District
- Time zone: UTC+3:00

Lesnoye Ukolovo (Russian: Лесное Уколово) is a rural locality (a selo) and the administrative center of Lesnoukolovskoye Rural Settlement, Krasnensky District, Belgorod Oblast, Russia. The population was 864 as of 2010. There are 22 streets.

== Geography ==
Lesnoye Ukolovo is located 13 km east of Krasnoye (the district's administrative centre) by road. Goncharovka is the nearest rural locality.
