= Podseredneye =

Podseredneye Подсереднее
- Selo
- Location within Belgorod Oblast Location within Russia
- Coordinates: 50°42′N 38°33′E
- Country: Russia
- Region: Belgorod Oblast
- District: Alexeyevsky District
- Time zone: UTC+3:00

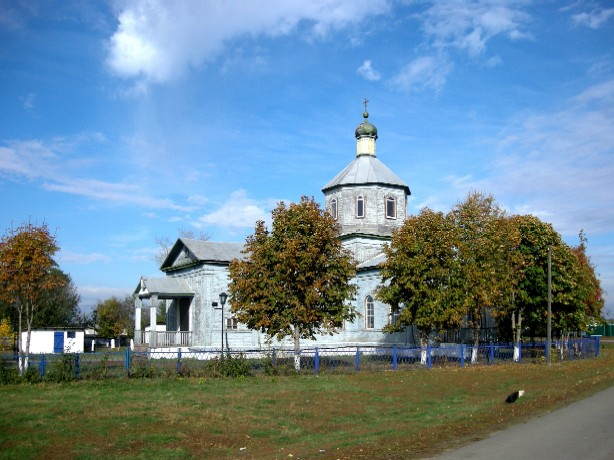
Podseredneye

Podseredneye (Russian: Подсереднее) is a rural locality (a selo) and the administrative center of Podserednenskoye Rural Settlement, Alexeyevsky District, Belgorod Oblast, Russia. The population was 1,284 as of 2010. There are nine streets.

== Geography ==
Podseredneye is located 18 km northwest of Alexeyevka (the district's administrative centre) by road. Ilovka is the nearest rural locality.
