= Sumovsky =

Sumovsky Сумовский
- Settlement
- Location within Belgorod Oblast Location within Russia
- Coordinates: 50°47′N 35°54′E
- Country: Russia
- Region: Belgorod Oblast
- District: Rakityansky District
- Time zone: UTC+3:00

Sumovsky (Russian: Сумовский) is a rural locality (a settlement) in Rakityansky District, Belgorod Oblast, Russia. The population was 101 as of 2010.

== Geography ==
Sumovsky is located 9 km southeast of Rakitnoye (the district's administrative centre) by road. Chistopolye is the nearest rural locality.
