= Bolshoye Gorodishche =

Bolshoye Gorodishche Большое Городище
- Selo
- Location within Belgorod Oblast Location within Russia
- Coordinates: 50°38′N 37°05′E
- Country: Russia
- Region: Belgorod Oblast
- District: Shebekinsky District
- Time zone: UTC+3:00

Bolshoye Gorodishche (Russian: Большое Городище) is a rural locality (a selo) and the administrative center of Bolshegorodishchenskoye Rural Settlement, Shebekinsky District, Belgorod Oblast, Russia. The population was 724 as of 2010. There are 9 streets.

== Geography ==
Bolshoye Gorodishche is located 42 km northeast of Shebekino (the district's administrative centre) by road. Strelitsa-Vtoraya is the nearest rural locality.
