= Urayevo =

Urayevo Ураево
- Selo
- Location within Belgorod Oblast Location within Russia
- Coordinates: 50°06′N 38°13′E
- Country: Russia
- Region: Belgorod Oblast
- District: Valuysky District
- Time zone: UTC+3:00

Urayevo (Russian: Ураево) is a rural locality (a selo) in Valuysky District, Belgorod Oblast, Russia. The population was 338 as of 2010. There are 6 streets.

== Geography ==
Urayevo is located 23 km southeast of Valuyki (the district's administrative centre) by road. Salovka is the nearest rural locality.
