= Krasnaya Niva =

Krasnaya Niva Красная Нива
- Selo
- Location within Belgorod Oblast Location within Russia
- Coordinates: 50°27′N 37°58′E
- Country: Russia
- Region: Belgorod Oblast
- District: Volokonovsky District
- Time zone: UTC+3:00

Krasnaya Niva (Russian: Красная Нива) is a rural locality (a selo) in Volokonovsky District, Belgorod Oblast, Russia. The population was 227 as of 2010. There is 1 street.

== Geography ==
Krasnaya Niva is located 13 km southeast of Volokonovka (the district's administrative centre) by road. Orlinoye is the nearest rural locality.
