= Bytsenkov =

Bytsenkov Быценков
- Settlement
- Location within Belgorod Oblast Location within Russia
- Coordinates: 50°44′N 35°39′E
- Country: Russia
- Region: Belgorod Oblast
- District: Krasnoyaruzhsky District
- Time zone: UTC+3:00

Bytsenkov (Russian: Быценков) is a rural locality (a settlement) in Krasnoyaruzhsky District, Belgorod Oblast, Russia. The population was 267 as of 2010. There are 6 streets.

== Geography ==
Bytsenkov is located 10 km north of Krasnaya Yaruga (the district's administrative centre) by road. Sergiyevka is the nearest rural locality.

== History ==
In 1968. by the decree of the Presidium of the Armed Forces of the RSFSR, the village of the Sergiev branch of the Krasnoyaruzhsky breeding plant was renamed Bytsevkov.
