= Biryuch (inhabited locality) =

Biryuch (Russian: Бирюч) is the name of several inhabited localities in Russia.

Urban localities

- Biryuch, a town in Krasnogvardeysky District of Belgorod Oblast

Rural localities

- Biryuch, Kolomytsevskoye Rural Settlement, Krasnogvardeysky District, Belgorod Oblast, a settlement in Krasnogvardeysky District of Belgorod Oblast
- Biryuch, Valuysky District, Belgorod Oblast, a selo in Valuysky District of Belgorod Oblast
- Biryuch, Voronezh Oblast, a selo in Biryuchenskoye Rural Settlement of Talovsky District in Voronezh Oblast
