= Cherepov, Belgorod Oblast =

Cherepov Черепов
- Khutor
- Location within Belgorod Oblast Location within Russia
- Coordinates: 50°23′N 38°43′E
- Country: Russia
- Region: Belgorod Oblast
- District: Alexeyevsky District
- Time zone: UTC+3:00

Cherepov (Russian: Черепов) is a rural locality (a khutor) in Alexeyevsky District, Belgorod Oblast, Russia. The population was 100 as of 2010. There is one street.

== Geography ==
Cherepov is located 33 km south of Alexeyevka (the district's administrative centre) by road. Bublikovo is the nearest rural locality.
