= Podgorskoye =

Podgorskoye Подгорское
- Selo
- Location within Belgorod Oblast Location within Russia
- Coordinates: 50°40′N 38°09′E
- Country: Russia
- Region: Belgorod Oblast
- District: Krasnogvardeysky District
- Time zone: UTC+3:00

Podgorskoye (Russian: Подгорское) is a rural locality (a selo) in Krasnogvardeysky District, Belgorod Oblast, Russia. The population was 138 as of 2010. There is 1 street.

== Geography ==
Podgorskoye is located 19 km (12 mi) west of Biryuch (the district's administrative centre) by road. Vesyoloye is the nearest rural locality.
