= Grechanikov =

Grechanikov Гречаников
- Khutor
- Location within Belgorod Oblast Location within Russia
- Coordinates: 50°34′N 38°35′E
- Country: Russia
- Region: Belgorod Oblast
- District: Alexeyevsky District
- Time zone: UTC+3:00

Grechanikov (Russian: Гречаников) is a rural locality (a khutor) in Alexeyevsky District, Belgorod Oblast, Russia. The population was 12 as of 2010. There is 1 street in the locality.

== Geography ==
Grechanikov is located 13 km southwest of Alexeyevka (the district's administrative centre) by road. Sidorkin is the nearest rural locality.
