= Papushin =

Papushin Папушин
- Khutor
- Location within Belgorod Oblast Location within Russia
- Coordinates: 50°27′N 38°36′E
- Country: Russia
- Region: Belgorod Oblast
- District: Alexeyevsky District
- Time zone: UTC+3:00

Papushin (Russian: Папушин) is a rural locality (a khutor) in Alexeyevsky District, Belgorod Oblast, Russia. The population was 173 as of 2010. There are 2 streets.

== Geography ==
Papushin is located 34 km south of Alexeyevka (the district's administrative centre) by road. Vlasov is the nearest rural locality.
