= Kirichenkov =

Kirichenkov Кириченков
- Khutor
- Location within Belgorod Oblast Location within Russia
- Coordinates: 50°31′N 38°57′E
- Country: Russia
- Region: Belgorod Oblast
- District: Alexeyevsky District
- Time zone: UTC+3:00

Kirichenkov (Russian: Кириченков) is a rural locality (a khutor) in Alexeyevsky District, Belgorod Oblast, Russia. The population was 85 as of 2010. There are 2 streets.

== Geography ==
Kirichenkov is located 25 km southeast of Alexeyevka (the district's administrative centre) by road. Kuleshov is the nearest rural locality.
