= Nizhnyaya Pokrovka =

Nizhnyaya Pokrovka Нижняя Покровка
- Selo
- Location within Belgorod Oblast Location within Russia
- Coordinates: 50°45′N 38°28′E
- Country: Russia
- Region: Belgorod Oblast
- District: Krasnogvardeysky District
- Time zone: UTC+3:00

Nizhnyaya Pokrovka (Russian: Нижняя Покровка) is a rural locality (a selo) in Krasnogvardeysky District, Belgorod Oblast, Russia. The population was 582 as of 2010. There are 4 streets.

== Geography ==
Nizhnyaya Pokrovka is located 21 km (13 mi) northeast of Biryuch (the district's administrative centre) by road. Sorokino is the nearest rural locality.
