= Vlasov, Alexeyevsky District, Belgorod Oblast =

Vlasov Власов
- Khutor
- Location within Belgorod Oblast Location within Russia
- Coordinates: 50°26′N 38°36′E
- Country: Russia
- Region: Belgorod Oblast
- District: Alexeyevsky District
- Time zone: UTC+3:00

Vlasov (Russian: Власов) is a rural locality (a khutor) in Alexeyevsky District, Belgorod Oblast, Russia. The population was 173 as of 2010. There are 2 streets.

== Geography ==
Vlasov is located 32 km south of Alexeyevka (the district's administrative centre) by road. Zhukovo is the nearest rural locality.
