= Khreshchyaty =

Khreshchyaty Хрещатый
- Khutor
- Location within Belgorod Oblast Location within Russia
- Coordinates: 50°26′N 38°33′E
- Country: Russia
- Region: Belgorod Oblast
- District: Alexeyevsky District
- Time zone: UTC+3:00

Khreshchyaty (Russian: Хрещатый) is a rural locality (a khutor) in Alexeyevsky District, Belgorod Oblast, Russia. The population was 305 as of 2010. There are 6 streets.

== Geography ==
Khreshchyaty is located 28 km southwest of Alexeyevka (the district's administrative centre) by road. Klimov is the nearest rural locality.
