= Kamyshevatoye =

Kamyshevatoye Камышеватое
- Selo
- Location within Belgorod Oblast Location within Russia
- Coordinates: 50°28′N 38°33′E
- Country: Russia
- Region: Belgorod Oblast
- District: Alexeyevsky District
- Time zone: UTC+3:00

Kamyshevatoye (Russian: Камышеватое) is a rural locality (a village/ selo) in Alexeyevsky District, Belgorod Oblast, Russia. The population was 383 as of 2010. There are 6 streets.

== Geography ==
Kamyshevatoye is located 24 km southwest of Alexeyevka (the district's administrative centre) by road. Stanichnoye is the nearest rural locality.
