= Kolomytsevo =

Kolomytsevo Коломыцево
- Selo
- Location within Belgorod Oblast Location within Russia
- Coordinates: 50°32′N 38°22′E
- Country: Russia
- Region: Belgorod Oblast
- District: Krasnogvardeysky District
- Time zone: UTC+3:00

Kolomytsevo (Russian: Коломыцево) is a rural locality (a selo) and the administrative center of Kolomytsevskoye Rural Settlement, Krasnogvardeysky District, Belgorod Oblast, Russia. The population was 384 as of 2010. There are 3 streets.

== Geography ==
Kolomytsevo is located 17 km (11 mi) south of Biryuch (the district's administrative centre) by road. Kravtsov is the nearest rural locality.
