= Razdornoye =

Razdornoye Раздорное
- Selo
- Location within Belgorod Oblast Location within Russia
- Coordinates: 50°37′N 38°12′E
- Country: Russia
- Region: Belgorod Oblast
- District: Krasnogvardeysky District
- Time zone: UTC+3:00

Razdornoye (Russian: Раздорное) is a rural locality (a selo) in Krasnogvardeysky District, Belgorod Oblast, Russia. The population was 635 as of 2010. There are 4 streets.

== Geography ==
Razdornoye is located 26 km (16 mi) west of Biryuch (the district's administrative centre) by road. Gredyakino is the nearest rural locality.
