= Syrovatsky =

Syrovatsky Сыроватский
- Khutor
- Location within Belgorod Oblast Location within Russia
- Coordinates: 50°29′N 38°35′E
- Country: Russia
- Region: Belgorod Oblast
- District: Alexeyevsky District
- Time zone: UTC+3:00

Syrovatsky (Russian: Сыроватский) is a rural locality (a khutor) in Alexeyevsky District, Belgorod Oblast, Russia. The population was 15 as of 2010. There is 1 street.

== Geography ==
Syrovatsky is located 21 km southwest of Alexeyevka (the district's administrative centre) by road. Kamyshevatoye is the nearest rural locality.
