= Utochka =

Utochka Уточка
- Selo
- Location within Belgorod Oblast Location within Russia
- Coordinates: 50°49′N 38°19′E
- Country: Russia
- Region: Belgorod Oblast
- District: Krasnogvardeysky District
- Time zone: UTC+3:00

Utochka (Russian: Уточка) is a rural locality (a selo) and the administrative center of Utyanskoye Rural Settlement, Krasnogvardeysky District, Belgorod Oblast, Russia. The population was 236 as of 2010. There are 4 streets.

== Geography ==
Utochka is located 34 km (21 mi) northwest of Biryuch (the district's administrative centre) by road. Plyukhino is the nearest rural locality.
