= Chuprinino =

Chuprinino Чупринино
- Selo
- Location within Belgorod Oblast Location within Russia
- Coordinates: 50°22′N 38°46′E
- Country: Russia
- Region: Belgorod Oblast
- District: Alexeyevsky District
- Time zone: UTC+3:00

Chuprinino (Russian: Чупринино) is a rural locality (a selo) in Alexeyevsky District, Belgorod Oblast, Russia. The population was 126 as of 2010. There is 1 street.

== Geography ==
Chuprinino is located 37 km south of Alexeyevka (the district's administrative centre) by road. Varvarovka is the nearest rural locality.
