= Gezov =

Gezov Гезов
- Khutor
- Location within Belgorod Oblast Location within Russia
- Coordinates: 50°32′N 38°38′E
- Country: Russia
- Region: Belgorod Oblast
- District: Alexeyevsky District
- Time zone: UTC+3:00

Gezov (Russian: Гезов) is a rural locality (a khutor) in Alexeyevsky District, Belgorod Oblast, Russia. The population was 305 as of 2010. There are 4 streets.

== Geography ==
Gezov is located 12 km southwest of Alexeyevka (the district's administrative centre) by road. Shcherbakovo is the nearest rural locality.
