= Alexeyenkovo =

Alexeyenkovo Алексеенково
- Selo
- Location within Belgorod Oblast Location within Russia
- Coordinates: 50°31′N 38°49′E
- Country: Russia
- Region: Belgorod Oblast
- District: Alexeyevsky District
- Time zone: UTC+3:00

Alexeyenkovo (Russian: Алексеенково) is a rural locality (a selo) in Alexeyevsky District, Belgorod Oblast, Russia. The population was 292 as of 2010. There are 6 streets.

== Geography ==
Alexeyenkovo is located 20 km southeast of Alexeyevka (the district's administrative centre) by road. Pyshnograyev is the nearest rural locality.
