= Koltunovka =

Koltunovka Колтуновка
- Selo
- Location within Belgorod Oblast Location within Russia
- Coordinates: 50°39′N 38°46′E
- Country: Russia
- Region: Belgorod Oblast
- District: Alexeyevsky District
- Time zone: UTC+3:00

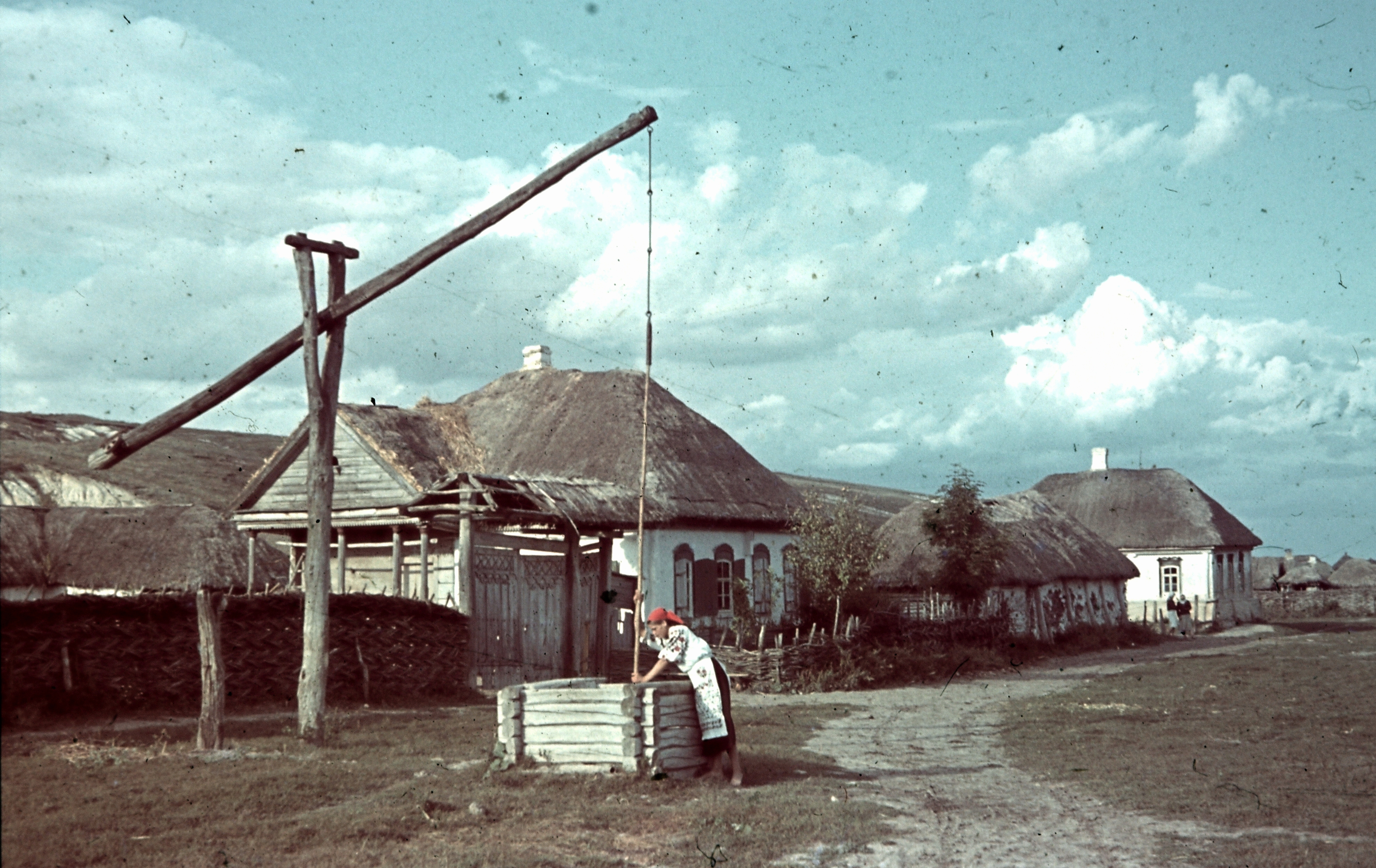

Koltunovka (Russian: Колтуновка) is a rural locality (a selo) in Alexeyevsky District, Belgorod Oblast, Russia. The population was 388 as of 2010. There are 12 streets.

== Geography ==
Koltunovka is located 8 km northeast of Alexeyevka (the district's administrative centre) by road. Alexeyevka is the nearest rural locality.
