= Palatovo, Belgorod Oblast =

Palatovo Палатово
- Selo
- Location within Belgorod Oblast Location within Russia
- Coordinates: 50°24′N 38°09′E
- Country: Russia
- Region: Belgorod Oblast
- District: Krasnogvardeysky District
- Time zone: UTC+3:00

Palatovo (Russian: Палатово) is a rural locality (a selo) and the administrative center of Palatovskoye Rural Settlement, Krasnogvardeysky District, Belgorod Oblast, Russia. The population was 924 as of 2010. There are 17 streets.

== Geography ==
Palatovo is located 43 km (27 mi) southwest of Biryuch (the district's administrative centre) by road. Podles is the nearest rural locality.
