= Blizhneye Chesnochnoye =

Blizhneye Chesnochnoye Ближнее Чесночное
- Selo
- Location within Belgorod Oblast Location within Russia
- Coordinates: 50°41′N 38°50′E
- Country: Russia
- Region: Belgorod Oblast
- District: Alexeyevsky District
- Time zone: UTC+3:00

Blizhneye Chesnochnoye (Russian: Ближнее Чесночное) is a rural locality (a selo) in Alexeyevsky District, Belgorod Oblast, Russia. The population was 125 as of 2010. There are 4 streets.

== Geography ==
Blizhneye Chesnochnoye is located 14 km northeast of Alexeyevka (the district's administrative centre) by road. Dalneye Chesnochnoye is the nearest rural locality.
