= Arnautovo =

Arnautovo Арнаутово
- Selo
- Location within Belgorod Oblast Location within Russia
- Coordinates: 50°24′N 38°25′E
- Country: Russia
- Region: Belgorod Oblast
- District: Krasnogvardeysky District
- Time zone: UTC+3:00

Arnautovo (Russian: Арнаутово) is a rural locality (a selo) in Krasnogvardeysky District, Belgorod Oblast, Russia. The population was 526 as of 2010. There are 6 streets.

== Geography ==
Arnautovo is located 17 km (11 mi) south of Biryuch (the district's administrative centre) by road. Nikitovka is the nearest rural locality.
