= Belozorovo =

Belozorovo Белозорово
- Selo
- Location within Belgorod Oblast Location within Russia
- Coordinates: 50°25′N 38°46′E
- Country: Russia
- Region: Belgorod Oblast
- District: Alexeyevsky District

Population (2010)
  - Total: 199
- Time zone: UTC+3:00

Belozorovo (Russian: Белозорово) is a rural locality (a selo) in Alexeyevsky District, Belgorod Oblast, Russia. The population was 199 as of 2010. There are 2 streets.

== Geography ==
Belozorovo is located 29 km south of Alexeyevka (the district's administrative centre) by road. Kovalevo is the nearest rural locality.
