= Kuleshov, Belgorod Oblast =

Kuleshov Кулешов
- Khutor
- Location within Belgorod Oblast Location within Russia
- Coordinates: 50°32′N 38°57′E
- Country: Russia
- Region: Belgorod Oblast
- District: Alexeyevsky District
- Time zone: UTC+3:00

Kuleshov (Russian: Кулешов) is a rural locality (a khutor) in Alexeyevsky District, Belgorod Oblast, Russia.

== Demographics ==
The population was 5 as of 2010. There is 1 street.

== Geography ==
Kuleshov is located 26 km southeast of Alexeyevka (the district's administrative centre) by road. Kirichenkov is the nearest rural locality.
