= Pokladov =

Pokladov Покладов
- Khutor
- Location within Belgorod Oblast Location within Russia
- Coordinates: 50°29′N 38°43′E
- Country: Russia
- Region: Belgorod Oblast
- District: Alexeyevsky District
- Time zone: UTC+3:00

Pokladov (Russian: Покладов) is a rural locality (a khutor) in Alexeyevsky District, Belgorod Oblast, Russia. The population was 83 as of 2010. There is 1 street.

== Geography ==
Pokladov is located 18 km south of Alexeyevka (the district's administrative centre) by road. Garbuzovo is the nearest rural locality.
