= Khmyzovka =

Khmyzovka Хмызовка
- Settlement
- Location within Belgorod Oblast Location within Russia
- Coordinates: 50°19′N 38°57′E
- Country: Russia
- Region: Belgorod Oblast
- District: Alexeyevsky District
- Time zone: UTC+3:00

Khmyzovka (Russian: Хмызовка) is a rural locality (a settlement) in Alexeyevsky District, Belgorod Oblast, Russia. The population was 132 as of 2010. There are 2 streets.

== Geography ==
Khmyzovka is located 44 km southeast of Alexeyevka (the district's administrative centre) by road. Kalitva is the nearest rural locality.
