= Sidorkin, Belgorod Oblast =

Sidorkin Сидоркин
- Khutor
- Location within Belgorod Oblast Location within Russia
- Coordinates: 50°35′N 38°35′E
- Country: Russia
- Region: Belgorod Oblast
- District: Alexeyevsky District
- Time zone: UTC+3:00

Sidorkin (Russian: Сидоркин) is a rural locality (a khutor) in Alexeyevsky District, Belgorod Oblast, Russia. The population was 96 as of 2010. There are 2 streets.

== Geography ==
Sidorkin is located 10 km southwest of Alexeyevka (the district's administrative centre) by road. Grechanikov is the nearest rural locality.
