= Gorovoye =

Gorovoye Горовое
- Selo
- Location within Belgorod Oblast Location within Russia
- Coordinates: 50°34′N 38°14′E
- Country: Russia
- Region: Belgorod Oblast
- District: Krasnogvardeysky District
- Time zone: UTC+3:00

Gorovoye (Russian: Горовое) is a rural locality (a selo) in Krasnogvardeysky District, Belgorod Oblast, Russia. The population was 352 as of 2010. There is one street.

== Geography ==
Gorovoye is located 16 km (9.9 mi) southwest of Biryuch (the district's administrative centre) by road. Novokhutornoye is the nearest rural locality.
