= Kushchino =

Kushchino Кущино
- Selo
- Location within Belgorod Oblast Location within Russia
- Coordinates: 50°31′N 38°39′E
- Country: Russia
- Region: Belgorod Oblast
- District: Alexeyevsky District
- Time zone: UTC+3:00

Kushchino (Russian: Кущино) is a rural locality (a selo) and the administrative center of Kushchinskoye Rural Settlement, Alexeyevsky District, Belgorod Oblast, Russia. The population was 569 as of 2010. There are 8 streets.

== Geography ==
Kushchino is located 15 km south of Alexeyevka (the district's administrative centre) by road. Shcherbakovo is the nearest rural locality.
