= Reznikov, Belgorod Oblast =

Reznikov Резников
- Khutor
- Location within Belgorod Oblast Location within Russia
- Coordinates: 50°35′N 38°48′E
- Country: Russia
- Region: Belgorod Oblast
- District: Alexeyevsky District
- Time zone: UTC+3:00

Reznikov (Russian: Резников) is a rural locality (a khutor) in Alexeyevsky District, Belgorod Oblast, Russia. The population was 1 as of 2010. There is 1 street.

== Geography ==
Reznikov is located 12 km southeast of Alexeyevka (the district's administrative centre) by road. Batlukov is the nearest rural locality.
