= Gredyakino =

Gredyakino Гредякино
- Selo
- Location within Belgorod Oblast Location within Russia
- Coordinates: 50°37′N 38°14′E
- Country: Russia
- Region: Belgorod Oblast
- District: Krasnogvardeysky District
- Time zone: UTC+3:00

Gredyakino (Russian: Гредякино) is a rural locality (a selo) in Krasnogvardeysky District, Belgorod Oblast, Russia. The population was 632 as of 2010. There are 2 streets.

== Geography ==
Gredyakino is located 29 km (18 mi) west of Biryuch (the district's administrative centre) by road. Razdrornoye is the nearest rural locality.
