= Redkodub =

Redkodub Редкодуб
- Khutor
- Location within Belgorod Oblast Location within Russia
- Coordinates: 50°30′N 39°05′E
- Country: Russia
- Region: Belgorod Oblast
- District: Alexeyevsky District
- Time zone: UTC+3:00

Redkodub (Russian: Редкодуб) is a rural locality (a khutor) in Alexeyevsky District, Belgorod Oblast, Russia. The population was 33 as of 2010. There is 1 street.

== Geography ==
Redkodub is located 40 km southeast of Alexeyevka (the district's administrative centre) by road. Tyutyunikovo is the nearest rural locality.
