= Seroshtanov =

Khutor in Belgorod Oblast, Russia

Seroshtanov Сероштанов
- Khutor
- Location within Belgorod Oblast Location within Russia
- Coordinates: 50°32′N 38°43′E
- Country: Russia
- Region: Belgorod Oblast
- District: Alexeyevsky District
- Time zone: UTC+3:00

Seroshtanov (Russian: Сероштанов) is a rural locality (a khutor) in Alexeyevsky District, Belgorod Oblast, Russia. The population was 7 as of 2010. There are 5 streets.

== Geography ==
Seroshtanov is located 12 km south of Alexeyevka (the district's administrative centre) by road. Orlov is the nearest rural locality.
