= Kovalevo =

Kovalevo Ковалево
- Selo
- Location within Belgorod Oblast Location within Russia
- Coordinates: 50°25′N 38°47′E
- Country: Russia
- Region: Belgorod Oblast
- District: Alexeyevsky District
- Time zone: UTC+3:00

Kovalevo (Russian: Ковалево) is a rural locality (a selo) in Alexeyevsky District, Belgorod Oblast, Russia. The population was 338 as of 2010. There are 3 streets.

== Geography ==
Kovalevo is located 28 km south of Alexeyevka (the district's administrative centre) by road. Belozorovo is the nearest rural locality.
