= Stanichnoye =

Stanichnoye Станичное
- Selo
- Location within Belgorod Oblast Location within Russia
- Coordinates: 50°30′N 38°32′E
- Country: Russia
- Region: Belgorod Oblast
- District: Alexeyevsky District
- Time zone: UTC+3:00

Stanichnoye (Russian: Станичное) is a rural locality (a selo) in Alexeyevsky District, Belgorod Oblast, Russia. The population was 217 as of 2010. There are 4 streets.

== Geography ==
Stanichnoye is located 25 km southwest of Alexeyevka (the district's administrative centre) by road. Kamyshevatoye is the nearest rural locality.
