= Bozhkovo =

Bozhkovo Божково
- Selo
- Location within Belgorod Oblast Location within Russia
- Coordinates: 50°32′N 38°55′E
- Country: Russia
- Region: Belgorod Oblast
- District: Alexeyevsky District
- Time zone: UTC+3:00

Bozhkovo (Russian: Божково) is a rural locality (a selo) in Alexeyevsky District, Belgorod Oblast, Russia. The population was 116 in 2010. There are five streets.

== Geography ==
Bozhkovo is located 23 km southeast of Alexeyevka (the district's administrative centre) by road. Shkuropatov and Nemenushchy are the nearest rural localities.
