= Golubinsky =

Golubinsky Голубинский
- Settlement
- Location within Belgorod Oblast Location within Russia
- Coordinates: 50°18′N 38°51′E
- Country: Russia
- Region: Belgorod Oblast
- District: Alexeyevsky District
- Time zone: UTC+3:00

Golubinsky (Russian: Голубинский) is a rural locality (a settlement) in Alexeyevsky District, Belgorod Oblast, Russia. The population was 16 as of 2010. There is 1 street.

== Geography ==
Golubinsky is located 45 km south of Alexeyevka (the district's administrative centre) by road. Krasnoye is the nearest rural locality.
