= Nadezhdovka =

Nadezhdovka Надеждовка
- Selo
- Location within Belgorod Oblast Location within Russia
- Coordinates: 50°37′N 39°06′E
- Country: Russia
- Region: Belgorod Oblast
- District: Alexeyevsky District
- Time zone: UTC+3:00

Nadezhdovka (Russian: Надеждовка) is a rural locality (a selo) in Alexeyevsky District, Belgorod Oblast, Russia. The population was 1 as of 2010.

== Geography ==
Nadezhdovka is located 86 km east of Alexeyevka (the district's administrative centre) by road. Palenin is the nearest rural locality.
