= Rostov railway drawbridge =

Rostov railway drawbridge Ростовский подвижный (подъёмный) железнодорожный мост
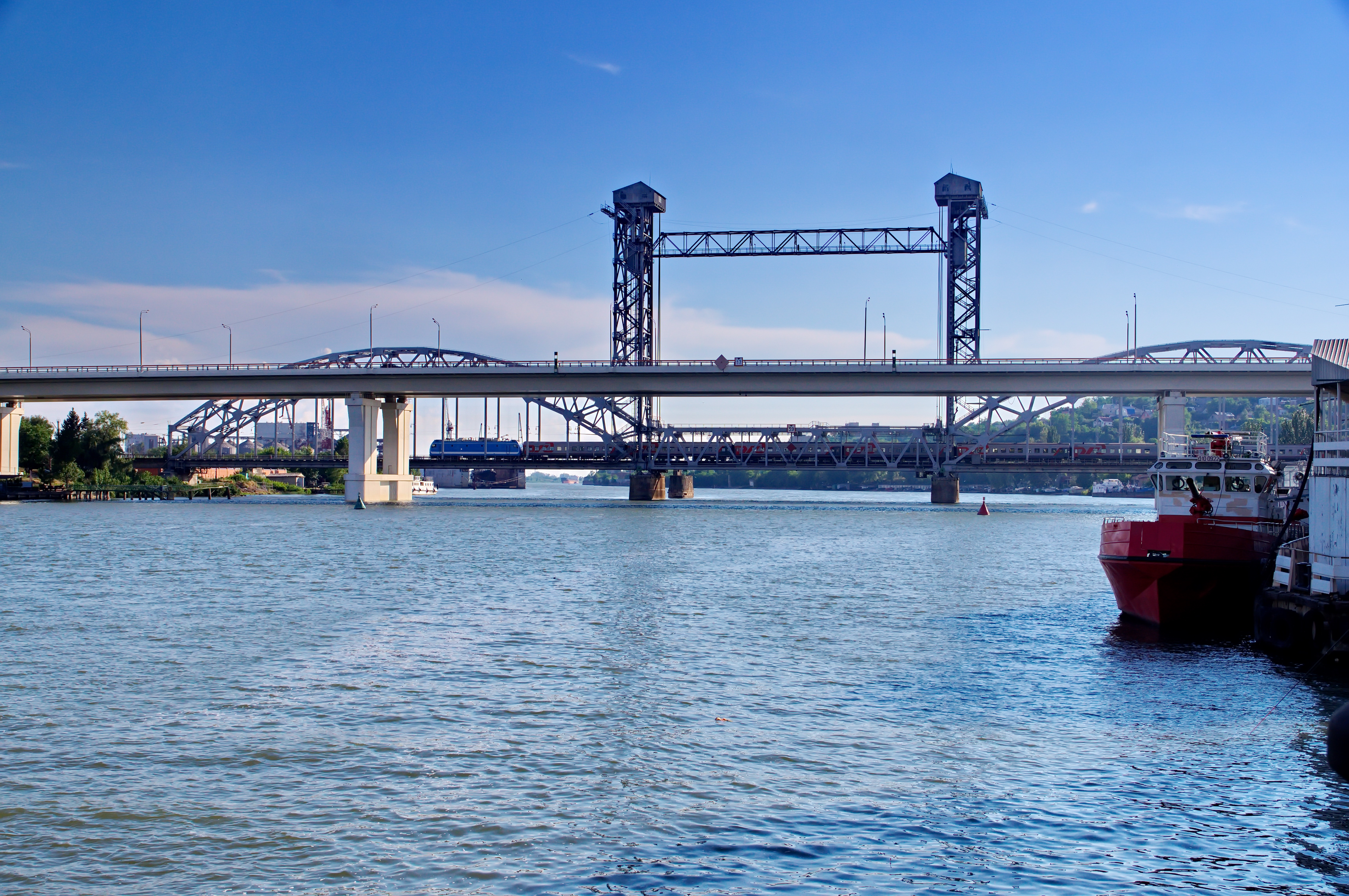
- Coordinates: 47°12′36″N 39°42′07″E
- Crosses: Don River (Russia)
- Locale: Rostov-on-Don, Rostov Oblast, Russia

Characteristics
- Total length: 300m
- Width: 11m

History
- Construction start: 1873
- Opened: 1874
- Rebuilt: 1912—1917, 1941, 1945, 1949—1952

Location
- Interactive map of Rostov railway drawbridge

Rostov movable railway bridge (Russian: Ростовский разводной железнодорожный мост) is a three-span arched double track bridge with a lifting middle part through the Don River. It is situated in Rostov-on-Don near the river Temernik’s mouth between the stations Rostov Glavny and Zarechnaya of North Caucasus Railway. The majority of passenger trains traveling through Rostov and a small amount of freight trains go through the bridge.

== History ==
=== The bridge of 1874 ===
The first bridge at this place was built in 1873-1874 according to E. Zubov’s project, while the building of the Vladikavkaz Railway. It was a single-track five-span bridge with original construction: the middle platform turned to 90 degrees standing along the river for the passing of vessels.

However the passing of ships was difficult, crashes to the bridge supports happened often. Special launching barge had been built by 1879 because of the Don Girlby committee’s initiative for the help in passing. During all navigation the barge was standing on anchors in front of the navigable span higher adrift, marine cables were brought from the barge to passing vessels and then the vessel was carefully pulled up with the help of steam winch or was pulled down adrift.

=== The bridge of 1917 ===
Because of these inconveniences and the insufficient capacity of the single-track bridge, in 1912 it was decided to build a new double track bridge 40-50 meters lower downstream, . Three-span bridge with a vertically rising middle truss was engineered by professors Nikolay Belelyubskiy, Grigori Perederiy and S. Belzetskiy, it was the first bridge with this construction in Russia. It had been erected by 1917 and was called “American bridge” by Rostovites because such bridges had been built in North America since the end of the 19th century. The old bridge was disassembled in 1920's, its constructions were used in them building of the Sochi-Adler railway.

=== Years of the WWII ===
In the first months of the war a temporary “littered” bridge was built at the place of the old one. During the first occupation of Rostov on November 21, 1941, while the retreat of The Red Army, the south span of American bridge and littered bridge were undermined by soviet sappers. However, Rostov had already been released on November 28, after that the littered bridge was recovered. During the second occupation of Rostov the littered bridge was undermined again, but subsequently it was recovered by Germans. While the release of Rostov in 1943 both bridges were almost completely destroyed.

=== Postwar period ===
In 1945 a temporary fixed bridge was built on the supports of the American bridge. In 1949-1952 the new bridge, which is being used even now, was built at the place of littered one. It slightly differed from the old American bridge in its construction. The bridge of 1945 was disassembled soon, its supports are standing still.

== Gallery ==
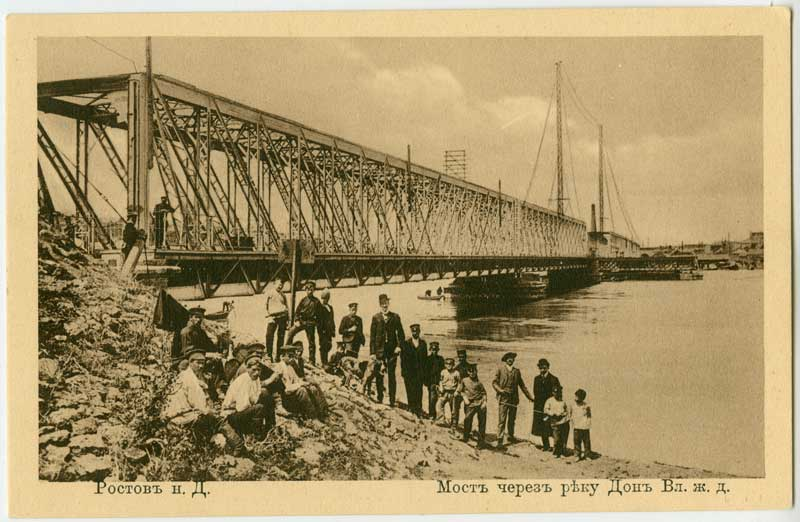
Postcard: Rostov-on-Don, bridge crossing the Don river of The Vladikavkaz railway

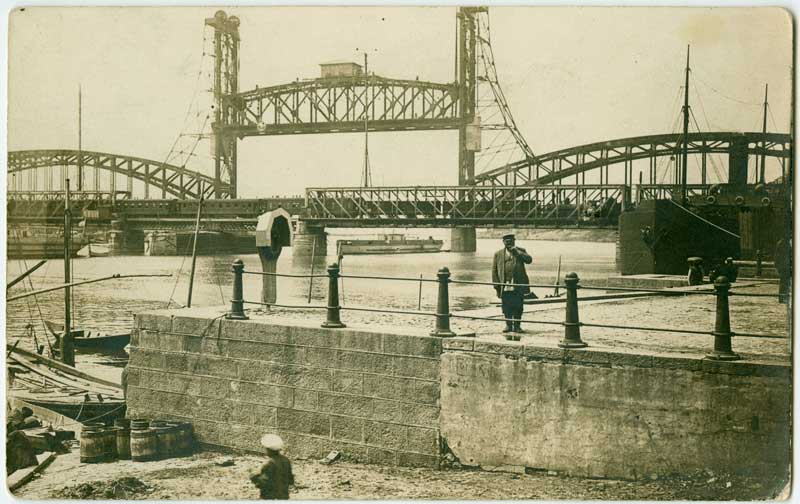
The first two of Rostov railway bridges

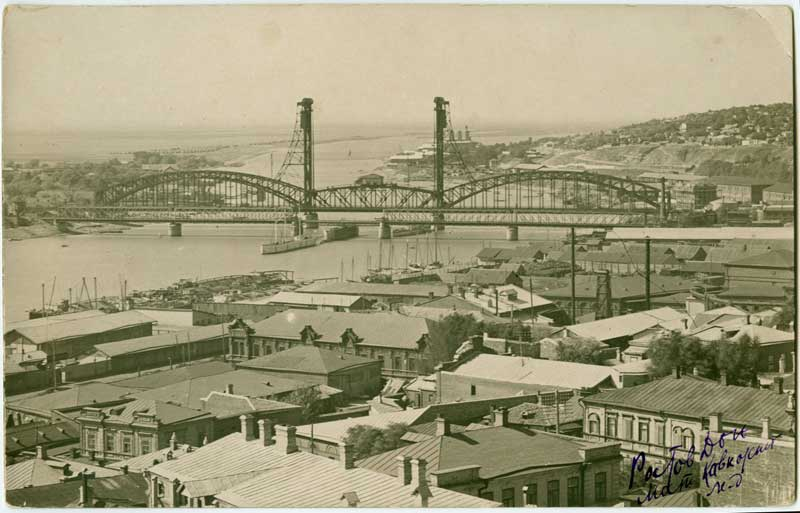
New "American bridge" is on the background

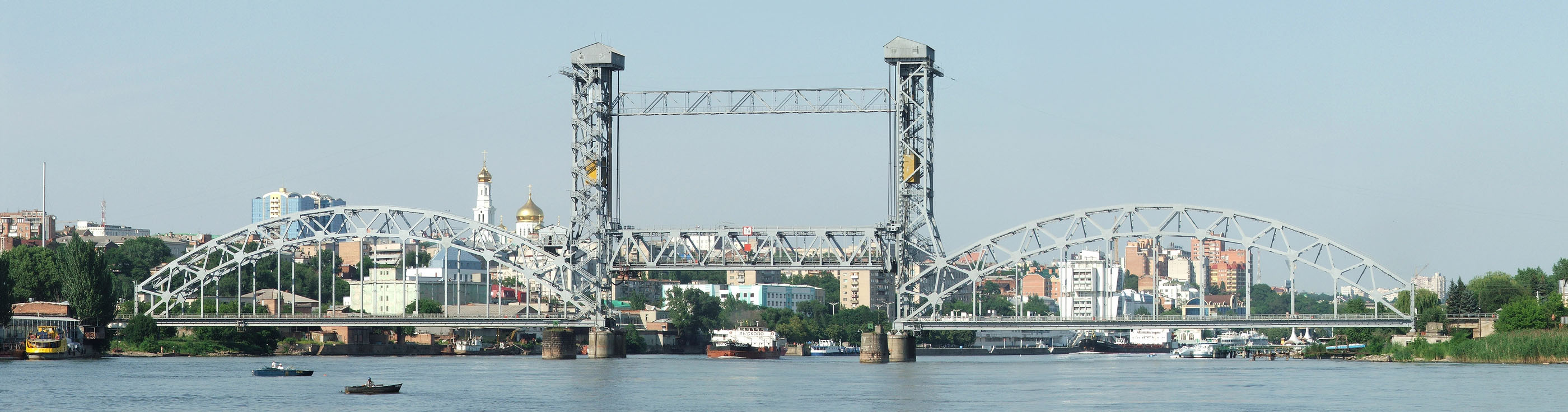
Panorama of the drawbridge
