= Baikovsky Bridge =

- Байковский мост
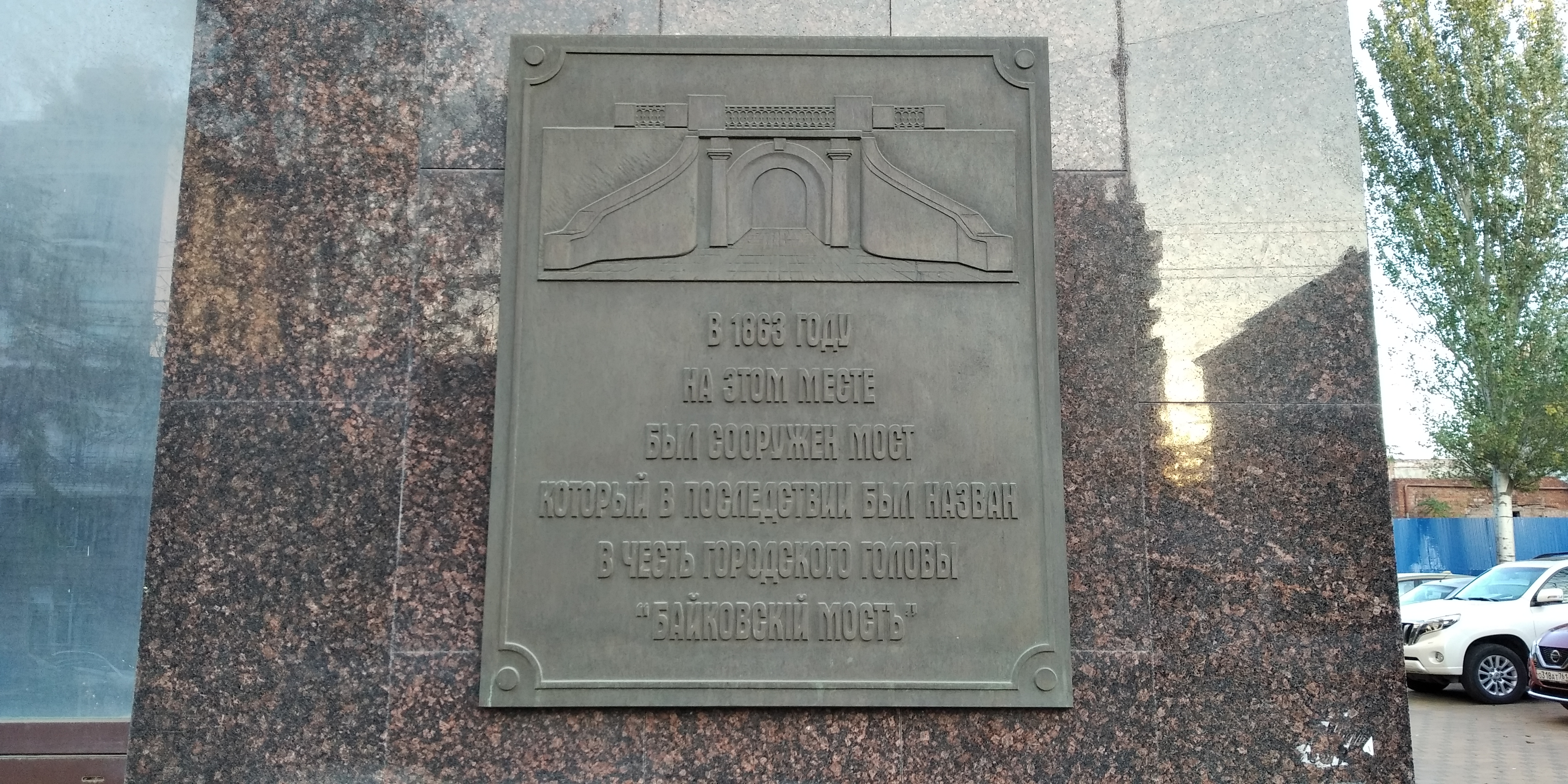
- Interactive map of the Baikovsky Bridge area

General information
- Type: bridge
- Location: Rostov-on-Don, Russia
- Coordinates: 47°07′54″N 39°25′21″E
- Completed: 1864

Baikovsky Bridge (Russian: Байковский мост) was a bridge in Rostov-on-Don constructed in 1864. It hasn't been preserved until our days and it was named after Rostov-on-Don governor Andrei Baykov.

== History ==
In 1840 Andrei Romanovich Yashchenko, who was then the governor of Rostov-on-Don, took an initiative to build a bridge that would lead through Generalnaya Gully. Such a bridge was vital, because, given usual bad weather, or a crowded September fair, it was quite problematic for local dwellers to reach the other side of the gully and transport their goods.

Rostov-on-Don City Duma also admitted that instead of already existing wooden bridges it was necessary to construct a stone bridge, since the former would have need to be constantly repaired. In 1857, all expenses were recorded and drafted by architect Lykov. When Andrei Matveyevich Baykov became the city's head, he began to work again on the issue of the bridge, but the materials had risen in price by that moment. Now the city authorities thought whether it would have been appropriate to build a stone bridge at all, and would it have not probably been better to build an arch instead. Nevertheless the bridge was built. Its solemn consecration took place on 30 August, 1864. On the railings there were installed memorial plaques with the inscription: "Baikovsky Bridge" and "Opened on August 30, 1864". This significant event happened almost simultaneously with another one: 20 days later the laying of the foundations of Petropavlovskaya Poorhouse took place in Rostov-on-Don. In 1867 it was decided to re-arrange the bottom of Baikov Bridge pipe.

The width of the bridge was 20 sazhen and the span was 2 sazhen. It was built of brick.

As of March 2013, the plaques on the bridge, the pipe did not survive, as the bridge itself.
