= Biryuch, Kolomytsevskoye Rural Settlement, Krasnogvardeysky District, Belgorod Oblast =

Biryuch Бирюч
- Settlement
- Location within Belgorod Oblast Location within Russia
- Coordinates: 50°31′N 38°25′E
- Country: Russia
- Region: Belgorod Oblast
- District: Krasnogvardeysky District
- Time zone: UTC+3:00

Biryuch (Russian: Бирюч) is a rural locality (a settlement) in Krasnogvardeysky District, Belgorod Oblast, Russia. The population was 303 as of 2010. There are 5 streets.

== Geography ==
Biryuch is located 13 km (8.1 mi) southwest of Biryuch (the district's administrative centre) by road. Valuy is the nearest rural locality.
