= Schepkinsky Forest =

Forest plantation in Rostov-on-Don, Russia

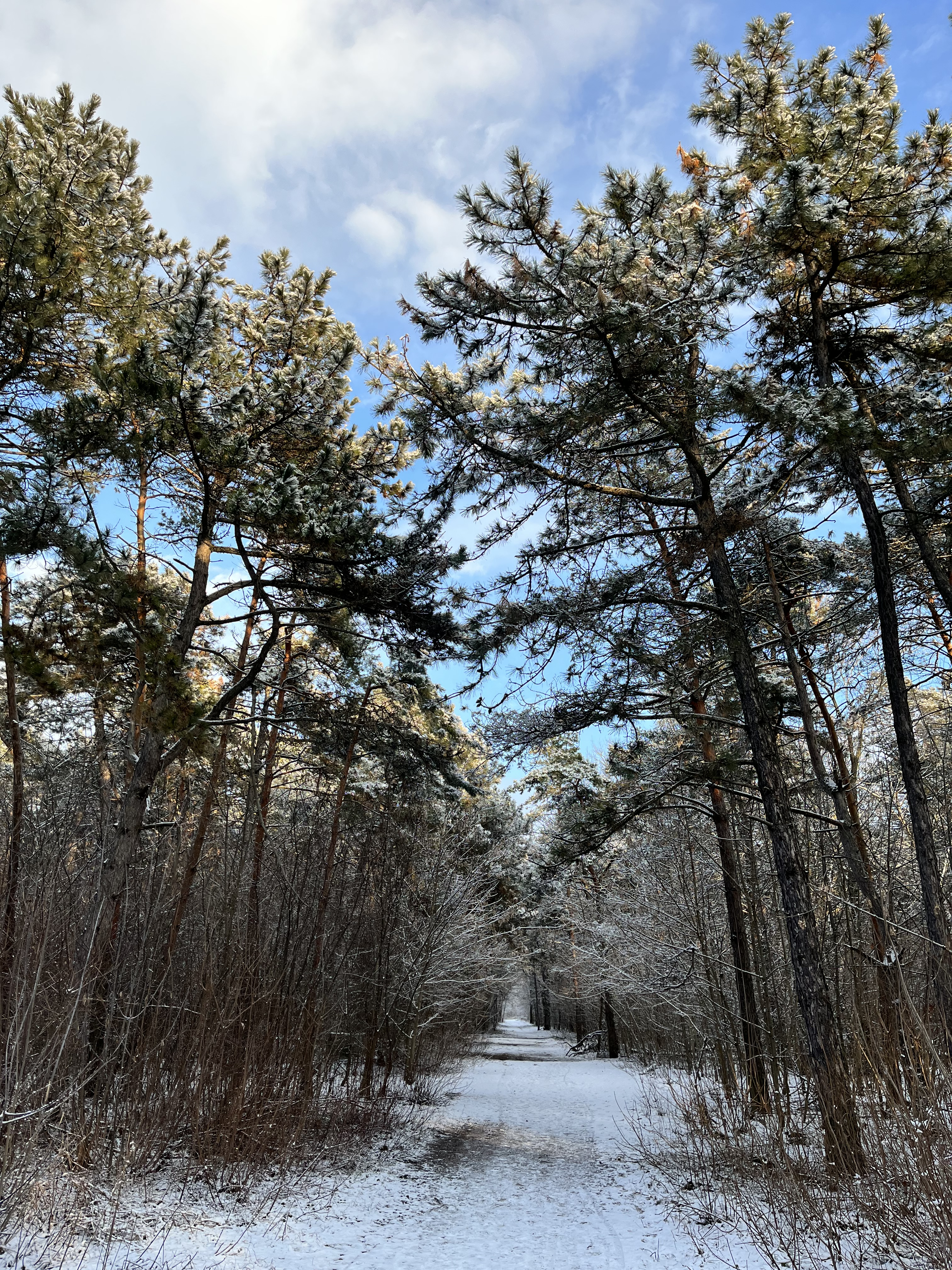
- Interactive map of Schepkinsky Forest
- Location: Rostov-on-Don, Russia
- Coordinates: 47.1950°N 39.4649°E
- Area: 1600 hectares

Schepkinsky Forest (Russian: Щепкинский лес) is a protected area and the biggest forest plantation in Rostov-on-Don. It was named after Schepkinskaya Gully, which is situated at the site of the forest.

== History ==
At the beginning of the 20th century, in the territory near Shchepkino village it was decided to establish a forest plantation, which was later transformed into zakaznik. It is known that the zakaznik was created for breeding of various kinds of animals on its territory, but the initiative failed and all activity in this field was ceased.

== Geography ==
Schepkinsky Forest is situated in the north-east of Rostov-on-Don. The terrain is made up of alluvial deposits. On the territory of the reserve there are two quarries, one of which is filled with water. In the central part of the forest there is a pond with standing water; bathing there is prohibited. In the eastern part of the forest plantation there is an artificial lake formed by the tributaries of the Bolshaya Kamyshevakha and Temernik rivers.

The natural lands of the Schepkinsky forest are home to many river and forest species. In a flooded quarry there are Prussian carp, monkey goby and crayfish. Roe deer, foxes, hares, wild boars, pheasants, partridges, herons and other species of animals common in southern Russia are habitat in the forest. Hunting in the Schepkinsky forest is prohibited, but a permission for fishing is not required.
