= Rostov-on-Don Fair =

The Fair in Rostov-on-Don (Russian: Ярмарка в Ростове-на-Дону) was a regularly held trade event in Rostov-on-Don in the 19th century. It was traditionally organized at the same place and used to attract a large number of merchants and other visitors. Usually three major fairs were held in Rostov-on-Don every year.

== History ==
=== 1850s ===
In the 1850s, Rostov-on-Don was a city where livestock, manufactured goods and grocery items that were brought from Moscow, Taganrog, Kharkov, and Odessa were traded. Here the salt from the Crimea was also brought, which was then sent to other Russian cities. Fish were bought which was sent to Voronezh, Moscow and Kharkov. Local flour, resin and various metals also enjoyed great popularity among merchants. Goods from the Caucasus (wool, lard, bread, flaxseed) were of particular interest to the inhabitants of Rostov-on-Don. In many respects the expansion of trade in Rostov-on-Don was promoted by the fairs that were held here in the 1840s—1850s. The fairs begin to be organized simultaneously with the appearance of the first settlements near Temernik River. In Autumn, a trade congress was organized here, which attracted the attention of local merchants and guests from the Ottoman Empire and Greece and from the residents of Zadonsk and Kuban steppes. The popularity of the fairs was explained simply: the villages in Russia were at great distances from each other, so coming to fairs and buying goods there was really beneficial.

=== 1860s ===
In the 1860s, fairs were held in Rostov-on-Don twice a year. The Ascension Fair was considered a fair of local importance, because there were traded only agricultural goods, livestock and horses. It lasted 3 days. At Christmas-Dormition Fair came people from all over Russia and traded woollen and silk fabrics, metal and leather products and porcelain. Foreign trade was also conducted there. According to statistical information, in 1866, goods worth in total 95,800 rubles were brought to the Ascension Fair, and sold for 42,000 rubles. At the Christmas-Dormition fair in this year were brought goods worth 3 289 000 rubles which were sold for 2 005 000 rubles. At the beginning of the 20th century, Rostov fairs were still held, but were not so large. Merchants began to buy goods throughout the year, so there was no need to make large reserves anymore.

At the fairs there were the goods from Russian, Asian and European markets. There were sold wine, tobacco and tea were. Officers from cavalry regiments bought their horses there. It is known that in the middle of the 19th century fairs were held at the very same place as in the beginning of the XX century. For the organization of fairs a large plot of land was allocated, which provided space for retail and wholesale trade for products manufactured in Moscow and in other cities. There were also established hotels for visiting merchants were organized.

In 1862, the city's head of Rostov-on-Don became Andrei Matveyevich Baykov, who during his time in this office greatly improved the city and also made a significant contribution to the development of fair trade. On 18 March 1863, he filed a motion for the establishment of special trade shops in the city. They were to be installed in place of awkward tents, so that the view of urban space would have been more pleasant. This decision was supported by the citizens. In order to facilitate access to the fair, a large stone bridge was built, which led through Generalnaya Gully. It was opened on 30 August 30, 1864 and subsequently received the name of Baikov Bridge in honor of the city's governor.

In November Baikov began to petition for the postponement of the Three Saints' (Three Holy Hierarchs') Fair up to 25 December, which instead had been traditionally held in late January and in early February. He sent his letters to the Ekaterinoslav Provincial Zemstvo Board, asking it to hold the fair until January 10 and call it Christmas Fair. He argued that Rostov merchants would have been pleased with this decision, because January and February had been the most suitable months for conducting trading operations. The profit from the fairs could have increased, because it could have been visited by those who live in distant places where fairs hadn't been held. His other good argument that in Rostov-on-Don there had been many traditional "winter" products, such as wool, fish or bread, which were better sold in Winter.

The Three Saints' Fair was renamed The Christmas Fair and was to start annually on 25 December and to end on 10 January. The Minister of Finance and the Minister of the Interior decided to abolish the Three Saints's, given the loss of its relevance. It was still held for some time in late January-early February. The Three Saints' Fair was the third and one of the main fairs held in Rostov-on-Don in the middle of the 19th century. The largest one was the Christmas-Dormition Fair, which was held from 21 August to 15 September. In June, the Ascension Fair was organized for the Feast of the Ascension, but it was characterized by smaller trade turnover than these of the Christmas-Dormition. And the third one was the Christmas Fair, held in winter and which featured a large trade turnover. There merchants traded for several weeks. Traditionally, fairs were not only trade, but also an entertaining event. There were arranged a farcical presentation, toured theatrical companies and worked carousels. Bagels and fish were one of the permanent and popular fair products.

=== Decline ===
Gradually the fairs began to lose their importance for the city and became less interesting and popular. Trade congress organizations were becoming less importantant and merchants had less trade. A possible reason for this could be a lack of advertising and improper storage of products. Also among the main factors was the development of rail and steamship communications.
