= Ilovlya (river) =

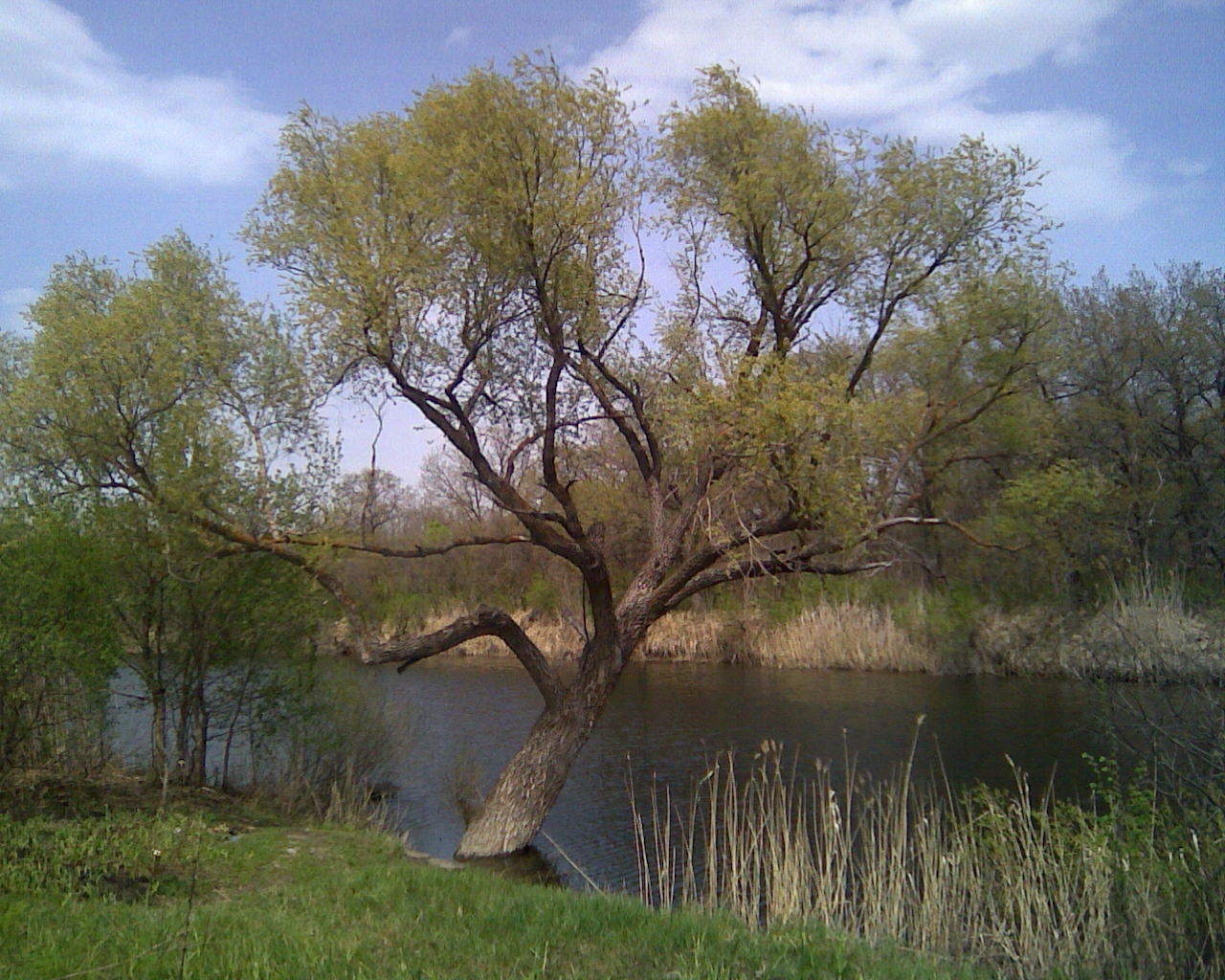
- Native name: Иловля (Russian)

Location
- Country: Russia

Physical characteristics
- Mouth: Don
  - coordinates: 49°13′39″N 43°55′07″E
- Length: 358 km (222 mi)
- Basin size: 9,250 km^{2} (3,570 sq mi)

Basin features
- Progression: Don→ Sea of Azov

The Ilovlya (Russian: Иловля) is a river in Saratov and Volgograd Oblasts of Russia. It is a left tributary of the Don, and is 358 kilometres (222 mi) long, with a drainage basin of 9,250 square kilometres (3,570 mi^{2}).

The average discharge is 9.6 cubic metres per second (340 cu ft/s). The river is frozen over from December to March. In earlier times there was a portage here, between the watersheds of the Volga River and Don River.
