= Mayerberg Album =

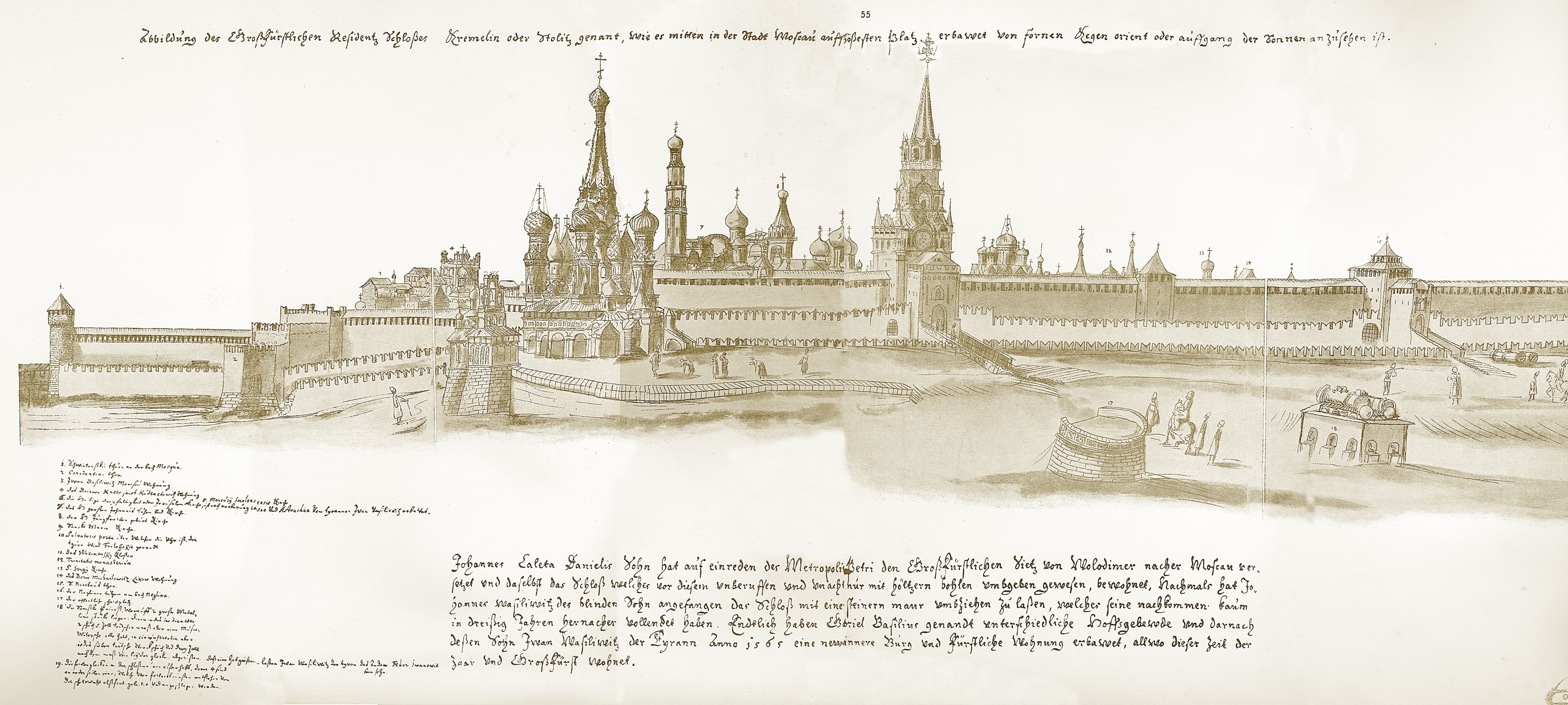
Mayerberg's drawing of the Moscow Kremlin

The Mayerberg Album is a collection of drawings and descriptions of the 17th-century Tsardom of Russia, made by Augustin von Mayerberg (also Meyerberg), a German baron (Freiherr), who together with Horatio Gugliemo Clavuccio was sent on an embassy Muscovy by emperor Leopold I in February 1661.

Mayerberg travelled in Muscovy for almost a year, arriving on 25 May (15 May O.S.) and departing on 5 May 1662 (26 April O.S.). He wrote two Latin accounts of the embassy. Mayerberg also supervised the production of numerous drawings, collected in the so-called Mayerberg Album. The drawings primarily by one Johann Rudolf Storn, although Mayerberg also was accompanied by a painter called Puman. The album also includes often extensive annotations of the pictures in German. The original album was kept in the Royal Library in Dresden.

The Mayerberg Album was edited by Friedrich von Adelung in two volumes in 1827 (including engravings based on the drawings). The work was translated into Russian in 1873 by A. N. Shemiakin, as Puteshestvie v Moskoviiu barona Augstiona Maierberga. The first publication of actual facsimiles of the drawings (in black and white) was edited by A. S. Suvorina (1903).
