= Don (river) =

Fifth-longest river in Europe (Russia)

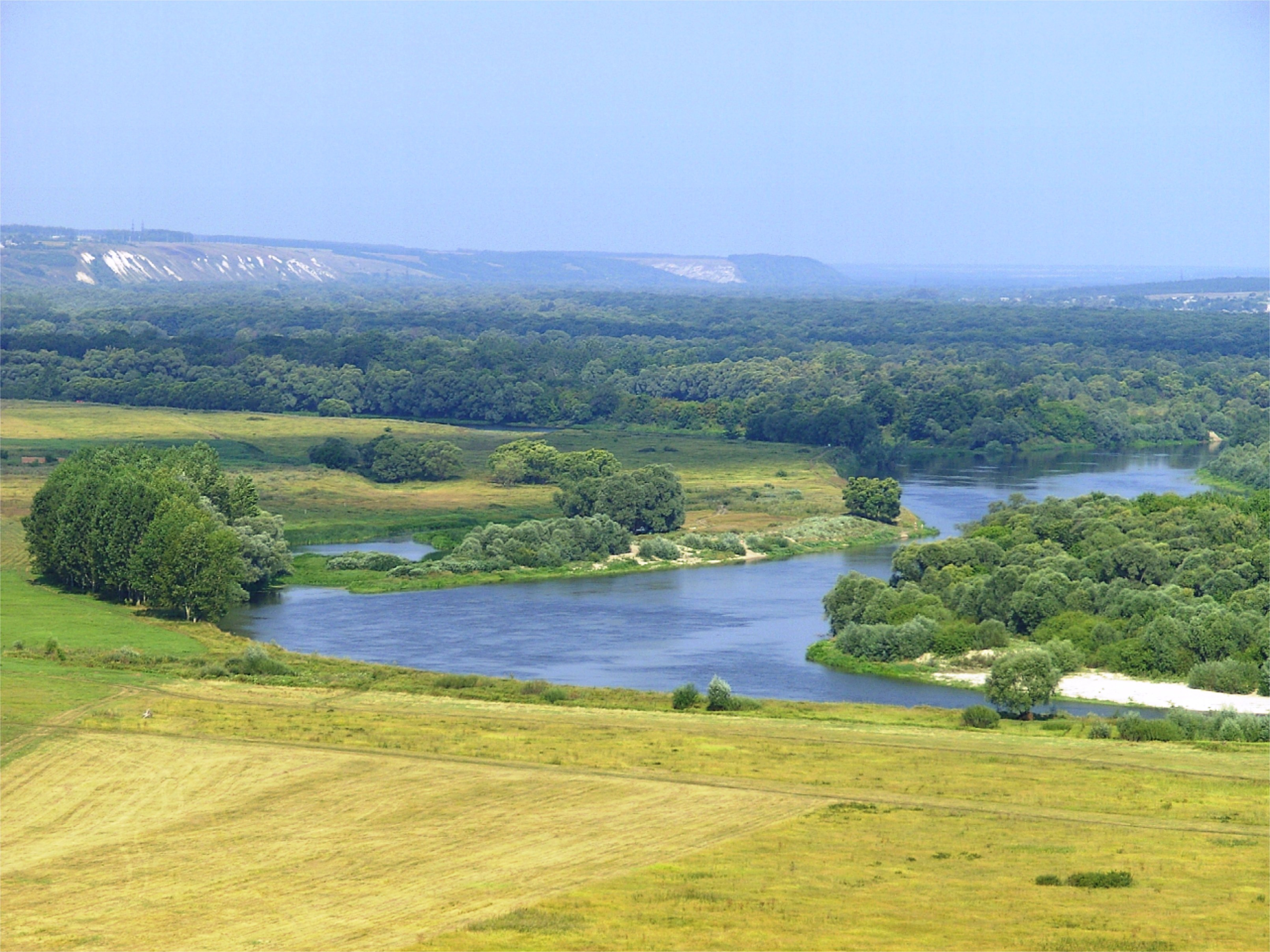
- The Don in Voronezh Oblast.

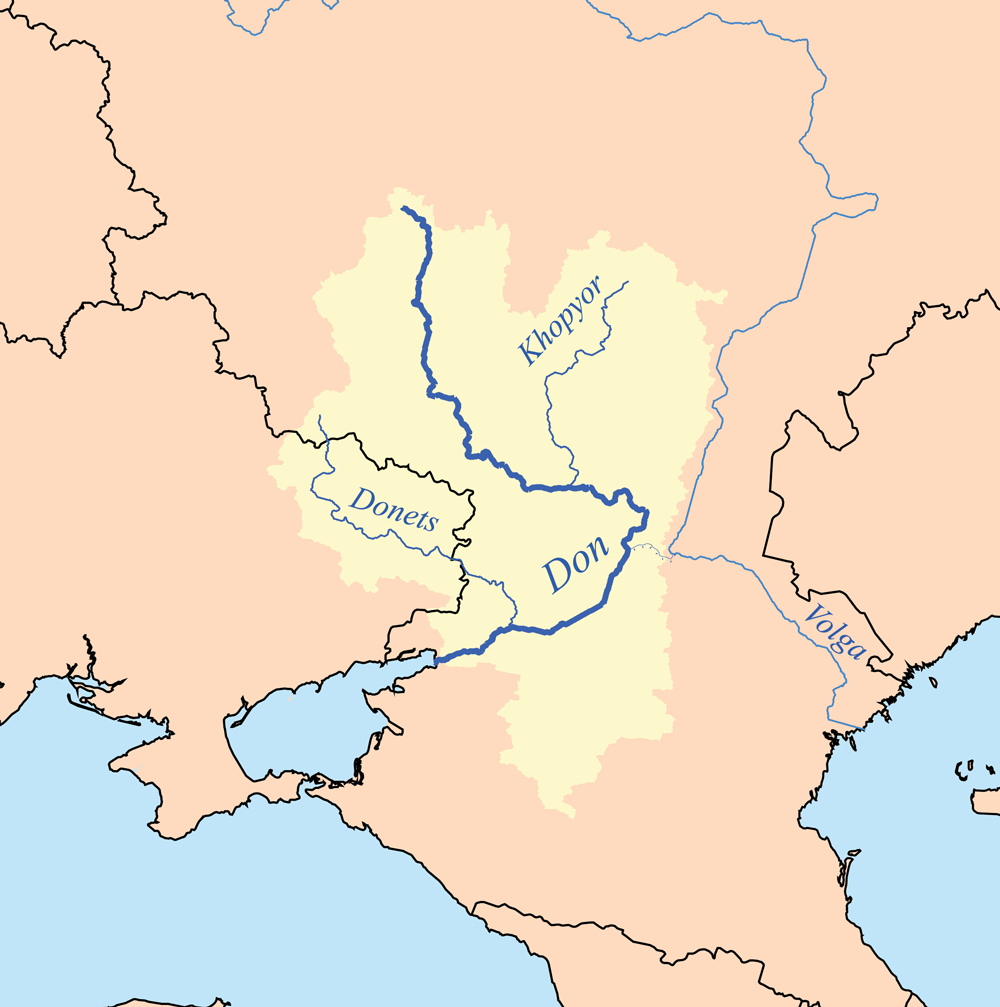
- Catchment of the Don
- Native name: Дон (Russian)

Location
- Country: Russia
- Region: Tula Oblast; Ryazan Oblast; Lipetsk Oblast; Voronezh Oblast; Volgograd Oblast; Rostov Oblast
- Cities: Voronezh, Rostov-on-Don

Physical characteristics
- Source
  - location: Novomoskovsk, Tula Oblast
  - coordinates: 54°00′43″N 38°16′41″E
  - elevation: 238 m (781 ft)
- Mouth: Sea of Azov
  - location: Kagal'nik, Rostov Oblast
  - coordinates: 47°05′11″N 39°14′19″E
  - elevation: 0 m (0 ft)
- Length: 1,870 km (1,160 mi)
- Basin size: 443,167.7 km^{2} (171,108.0 mi^{2})
- Discharge
  - location: Don Delta
  - average: (Period: 1971–2000) 987.8 m^{3}/s (34,880 cu ft/s)
- Discharge
  - location: Rostov-on-Don
  - average: (Period: 1971–2000) 955.2 m^{3}/s (33,730 cu ft/s)
- Discharge
  - location: Voronezh
  - average: (Period: 1971–2000) 138.6 m^{3}/s (4,890 cu ft/s)

Basin features
- Progression: Sea of Azov
- River system: Don River
- Tributaries
  - left: Voronezh, Bityug, Khopyor, Medveditsa, Ilovlya, Sal, Manych
  - right: Krasivaya Mecha, Bystraya Sosna, Tikhaya Sosna, Chyornaya Kalitva, Chir, Seversky Donets

The Don (Russian: Дон) is the fifth-longest river in Europe. Flowing from Central Russia to the Sea of Azov in Southern Russia, it is one of Russia's largest rivers and played an important role for traders from the Byzantine Empire.

Its basin is between the Dnieper basin to the west, the lower Volga basin immediately to the east, and the Oka basin (tributary of the Volga) to the north. Native to much of the basin were Slavic nomads.

The Don rises in the town of Novomoskovsk 60 kilometres (37 mi) southeast of Tula (in turn 193 kilometres (120 mi) south of Moscow), and flows 1,870 kilometres to the Sea of Azov. The river's upper half meanders subtly south; however, its lower half consists of a great eastern curve, including Voronezh, making its final stretch, an estuary, run west south-west. The main city on the river is Rostov-on-Don. Its main tributary is the Seversky Donets, centred on the mid-eastern end of Ukraine, thus the other country in the overall basin. To the east of a series of three great ship locks and associated ponds forms the 101-kilometre (63 mi) Volga–Don Canal.

== History ==
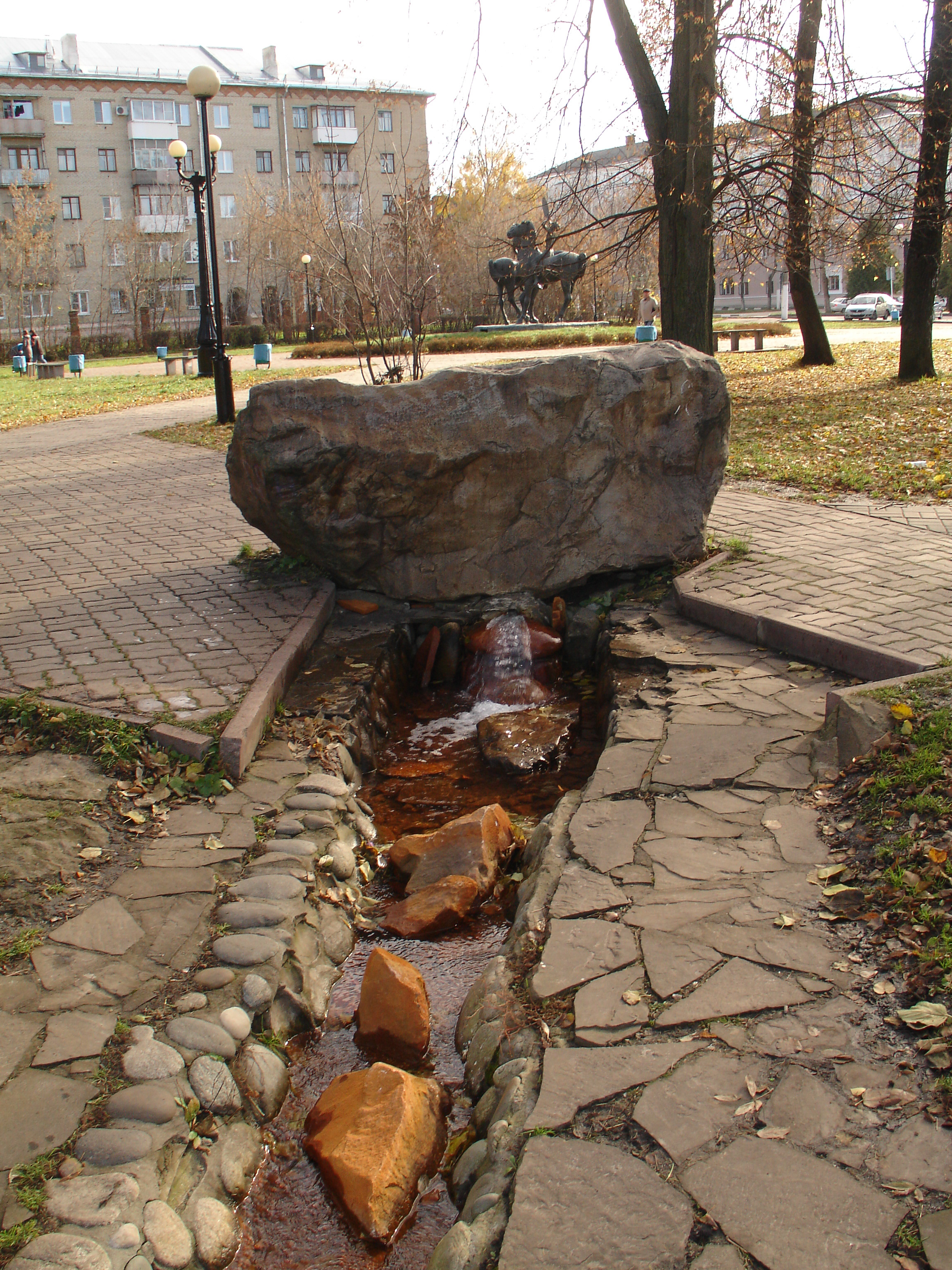
Source of the Don in Novomoskovsk, Tula Oblast

The name Don derives from the Avestan and Rigveda word dānu. According to the Kurgan hypothesis, the Volga-Don river region was the homeland of the Proto-Indo-Europeans around 4,000 BC. The Don river functioned as a fertile cradle of civilization where the Neolithic farmer culture of the Near East fused with the hunter-gatherer culture of Siberian groups, resulting in the nomadic pastoralism of the Proto-Indo-Europeans. The east Slavic tribe of the Antes inhabited the Don and other areas of Southern and Central Russia. The area around the Don was influenced by the Byzantine Empire because the river was important for traders from Byzantium.

In antiquity, the river was viewed as the border between Europe and Asia by some ancient Greek geographers. In the Book of Jubilees, it is mentioned as being part of the border, beginning with its easternmost point up to its mouth, between the allotments of the sons of Noah, that of Japheth to the north and that of Shem to the south. (Note: Later works, as the 7th-century T and O map, also depict the Don as the border between Europe and Asia) During the times of the old Scythians it was known in Greek as the Tanaïs (Τάναϊς) and has been a major trading route ever since. Tanais appears in ancient Greek sources as both the name of the river and of a city on it, situated in the Maeotian marshes. (Note: e.g. Strabo, Geographica) Greeks also called the river Iazartes (Ἰαζάρτης). Pliny gives the Scythian name of the Tanais as Silys.

According to an anonymous Greek source, which historically (but not certainly) has been attributed to Plutarch, the Don was home to the legendary Amazons of Greek mythology.

In the Early Middle Ages, much of the lower Don was controlled by the Khazar Khaganate which built on its left bank a large limestone fortress, Sarkel, to defend a vital portage between the Don and the Volga. Further north the area was settled by the so-called Don Slavs. After the Mongol conquests most of the Don basin was incorporated into the Golden Horde, which established an important trade outpost, Azak, in the Don estuary. This estuary area has been speculated to be the source of the Black Death in the mid-14th century.

The Don Cossacks, who settled the fertile valley of the river in the 16th and 17th centuries, were named after the river. While the lower Don was well known to ancient geographers, its middle and upper reaches were not mapped with any accuracy before the gradual conquest of the area by the Tsardom of Russia in the 16th century.

The fort of Donkov was founded by the princes of Ryazan in the late 14th century. The fort stood on the left bank of the Don, about 34 kilometres (21 mi) from the modern town of Dankov, until 1568, when it was destroyed by the Crimean Tatars, but was soon restored at a better fortified location. It is shown as Donko in Mercator's Atlas (1596). Donkov was again relocated in 1618, appearing as Donkagorod in Joan Blaeu's map of 1645.

Both Blaeu and Mercator follow the 16th-century cartographic tradition of letting the Don originate in a great lake, labeled Resanskoy ozera by Blaeu. Mercator follows Giacomo Gastaldo (1551) in showing a waterway connecting this lake (by Gastaldo labeled Ioanis Lago, by Mercator Odoium lac. Iwanowo et Jeztoro) to Ryazan and the Oka River. Mercator shows Mtsensk (Msczene) as a great city on this waterway, suggesting a system of canals connecting the Don with the Zusha (Schat) and Upa (Uppa) centered on a settlement Odoium, reported as Odoium lacum (Juanow ozero) in the map made by Baron Augustin von Mayerberg, leader of an embassy to the Tsardom of Russia in 1661.

In modern literature, the Don region was featured in the work And Quiet Flows the Don by Mikhail Aleksandrovich Sholokhov, a Nobel-prize winning writer from the stanitsa of Veshenskaya.

== Dams and canals ==
At its easternmost point, the Don comes within 100 kilometres (62 mi) of the Volga. The Volga–Don Canal, 101 kilometres (65 mi), connects the two. It is a broad, deep waterway capable of transporting oil tanker size vessels. It is one of two which enables ships to depart the Caspian Sea, the other, a series, connected to the Baltic Sea. The level of the Don where connected is raised by the Tsimlyansk Dam, forming the Tsimlyansk Reservoir.

For the next 130 kilometres (81 mi) below the Tsimlyansk Dam, the sufficient depth of the Don is maintained by the sequence of three dam-and-ship-lock complexes: the Nikolayevsky Ship Lock (Николаевский гидроузел), Konstantinovsk Ship Lock (Константиновский гидроузел), and the best known of the three, the Kochetovsky Ship Lock (Кочетовский гидроузел). The Kochetovsky Lock, built in 1914–19 and doubled in 2004–08, is 7.5 kilometres (4.7 mi) downstream of the discharge of the Seversky Donets and 131 kilometres (81 mi) upstream of Rostov-on-Don. It is at 47°34′07″N 40°51′10″E. This facility, with its dam, maintains a navigable head of water locally and into the lowermost stretch of the Seversky Donets. This is presently the last lock on the Don; below it, deep-draught navigation is maintained by dredging.

In order to improve shipping conditions in the lower reaches of the Don, the waterway authorities support plans for one or two more low dams with locks. These will be in Bagayevsky District and possibly Aksaysky District.

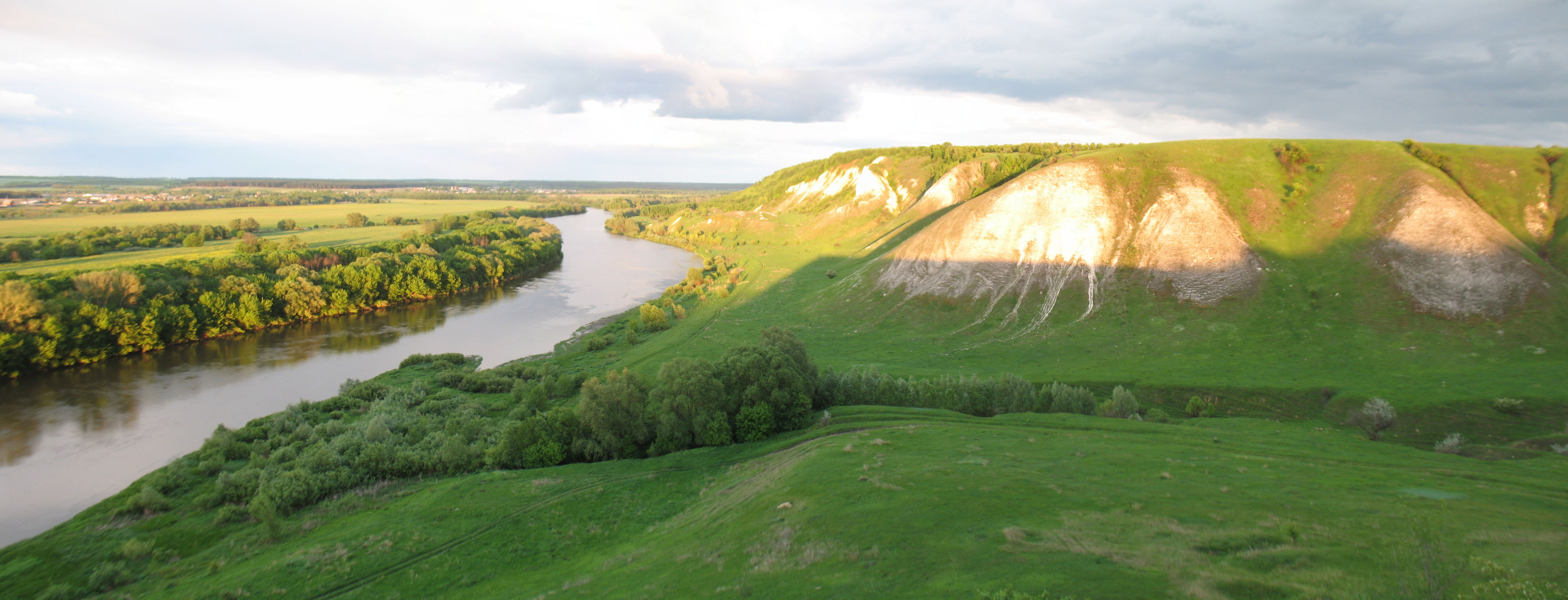
Don river in Voronezh Oblast

== Tributaries ==
Main tributaries from source to mouth:

- Nepryadva
- Krasivaya Mecha
- Bystraya Sosna
- Veduga
- Voronezh
- Tikhaya Sosna
- Bityug
- Osered
- Chyornaya Kalitva
- Khopyor – 1,010 kilometres (630 mi)
- Medveditsa
- Ilovlya
- Chir
- Seversky Donets – 1,053 kilometres (654 mi)
  - Aidar – 264 kilometres (164 mi)
- Sal
- Manych
- Aksay
- Temernik

== See also ==
- And Quiet Flows the Don by Mikhail Sholokov
- Don goat
- Rostov railway drawbridge
