= Chyornaya Kalitva =

River in Belgorod and Voronezh, Russia

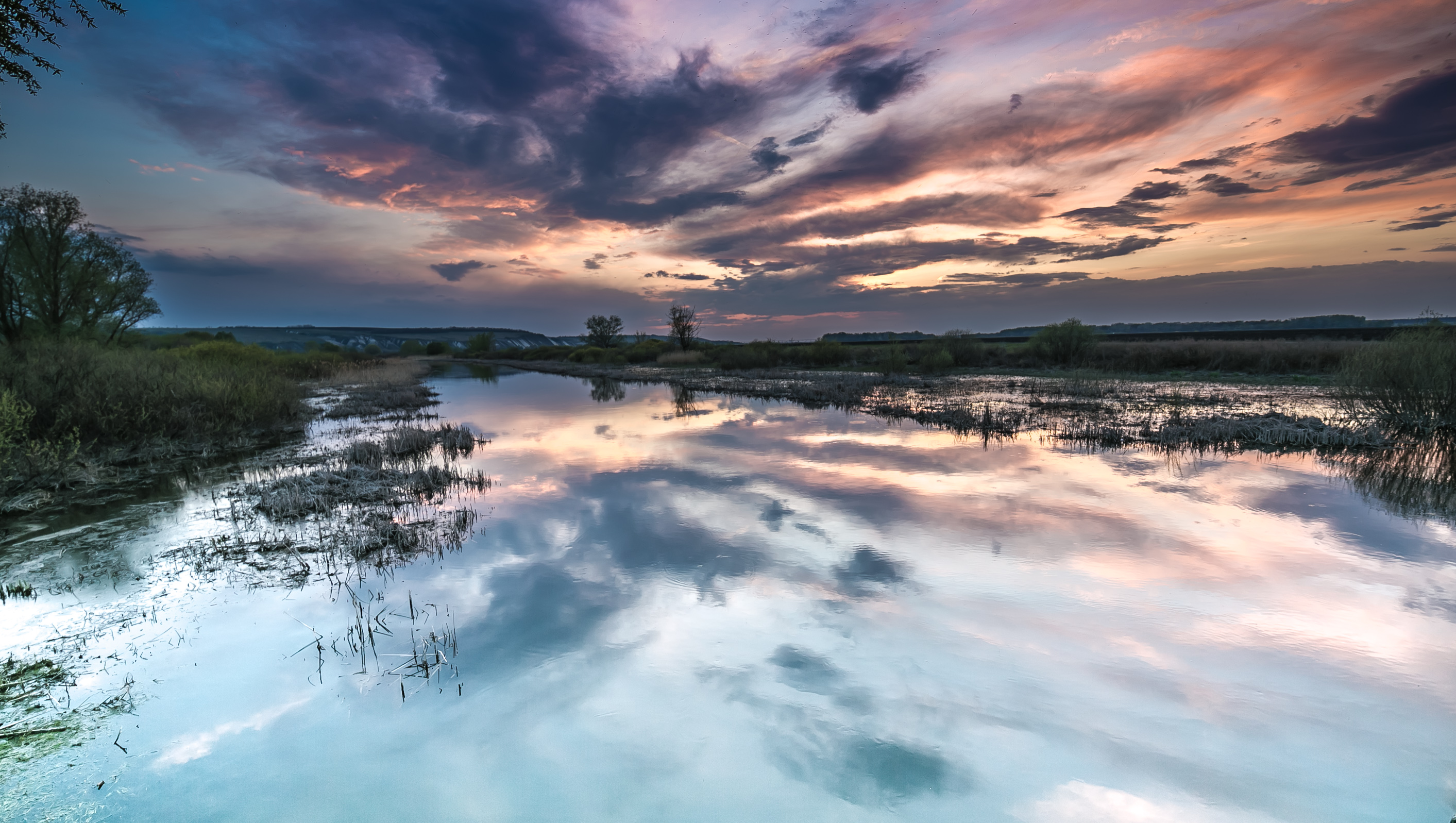

Location
- Country: Russia

Physical characteristics
- Source
  - location: Belgorod Oblast
  - elevation: 360 m (1,180 ft)
- Mouth: Don
  - coordinates: 50°05′16″N 40°00′06″E
- Length: 162 km (101 mi)
- Basin size: 5,750 km^{2} (2,220 sq mi)
- Discharge
  - average: 124 cubic metres per second (4,400 cu ft/s)

Basin features
- Progression: Don→ Sea of Azov

The Chyornaya Kalitva or Chernaya Kalitva ("Black Kalitva"; Russian: Чёрная Калитва) is a river in the Belgorod and Voronezh regions in Russia. It is a right, east-flowing, tributary of Don River. It enters the Don about 185 km south of Voronezh. It is 162 kilometres (101 mi) long, and has a drainage basin of 5,750 square kilometres (2,220 sq mi).

About 225 km south the Belaya (White) Kalitva flows south to join the Donets at the town of Belaya Kalitva.
