= Tikhaya Sosna =

River in Russia (Don tributary)

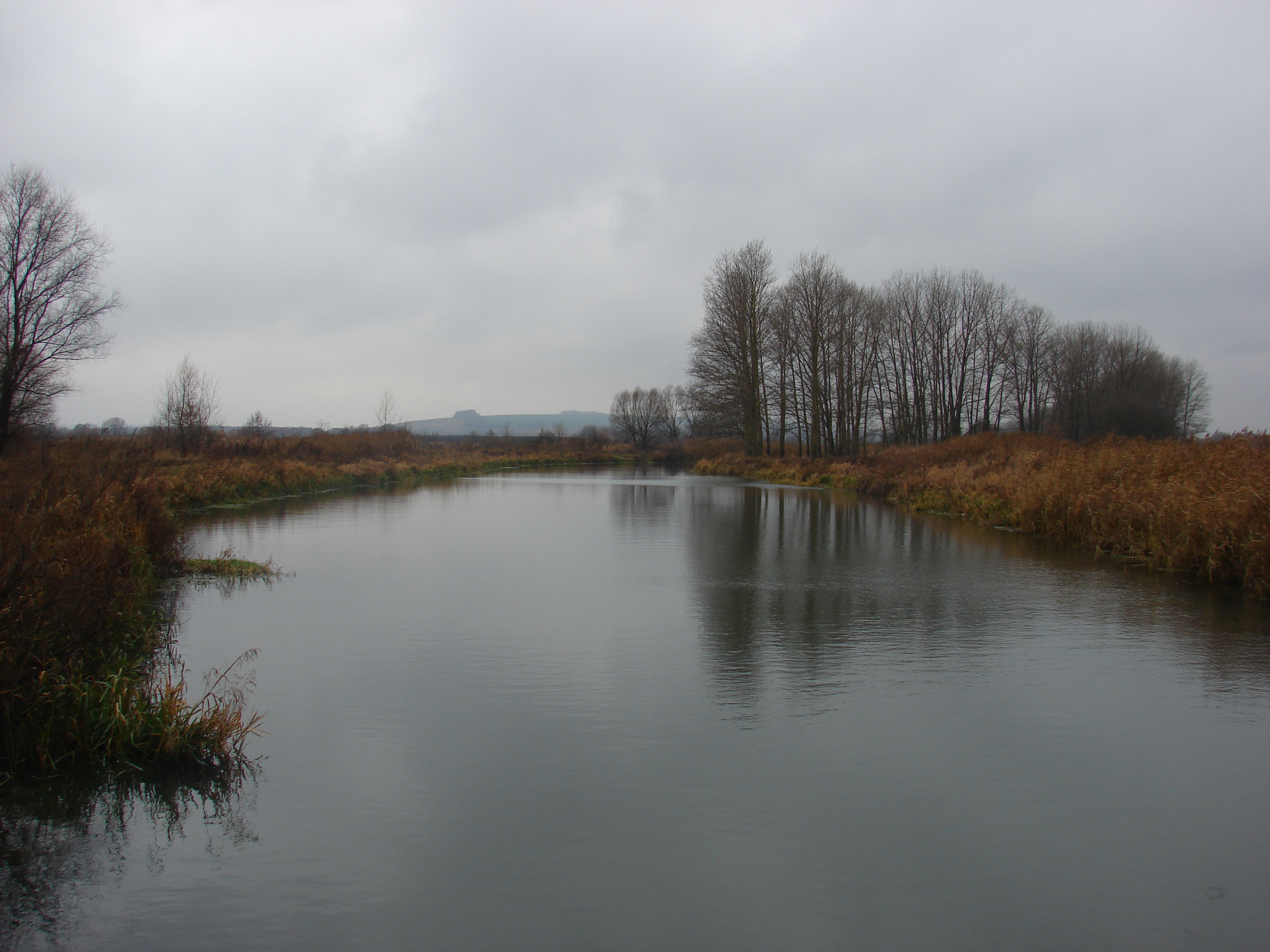
- Native name: Тихая Сосна (Russian)

Location
- Country: Russia

Physical characteristics
- Mouth: Don
  - coordinates: 50.9828°N 39.3071°E
- Length: 161 km (100 mi)
- Basin size: 4,350 km^{2} (1,680 sq mi)

Basin features
- Progression: Don→ Sea of Azov

Tikhaya Sosna (Russian: Ти́хая Сосна́) is a river in Belgorod and Voronezh oblasts of Russia. It is a right tributary of the river Don. It is 161 kilometres (100 mi) long, with a drainage basin of 4,350 square kilometres (1,680 mi^{2}).

The river has its sources in the eastern part of Belgorod Oblast, on the southeastern slopes of the Central Russian Upland. It flows in a northeasterly direction, and joins the Don some 15 kilometres (9 mi) west of the town of Liski in Voronezh Oblast.

Along the Tikhaya Sosna lie the towns of Biryuch, Alexeyevka and Ostrogozhsk.
