= Biryuch, Voronezh Oblast =

Biryuch Бирюч
- Selo
- Location within Voronezh Oblast Location within Russia
- Coordinates: 51°20′N 40°42′E
- Country: Russia
- Region: Voronezh Oblast
- District: Talovsky District
- Time zone: UTC+3:00

Biryuch (Russian: Бирюч) is a rural locality (a selo) in Tishanskoye Rural Settlement, Talovsky District, Voronezh Oblast, Russia. The population was 509 as of 2015. There are 6 streets.

== Geography ==
Biryuch is located on the left bank of the Sukhaya Tishanka River, 39 km north of Talovaya (the district's administrative centre) by road. Novaya Zhizn is the nearest rural locality.
