= Biryuch, Valuysky District, Belgorod Oblast =

Biryuch Бирюч
- Selo
- Location within Belgorod Oblast Location within Russia
- Coordinates: 50°15′N 37°43′E
- Country: Russia
- Region: Belgorod Oblast
- District: Valuysky District
- Time zone: UTC+3:00

Biryuch (Russian: Бирюч) is a rural locality (a selo) and the administrative center of Biryuchanskoye Rural Settlement, Valuysky District, Belgorod Oblast, Russia. The population was 221 as of 2010. There are 4 streets.

== Geography ==
Biryuch is located 32 km west of Valuyki (the district's administrative centre) by road. Dubrovka is the nearest rural locality.
