= Petropavlovskaya Poorhouse =

- Petropavlovskaya Poorhouse
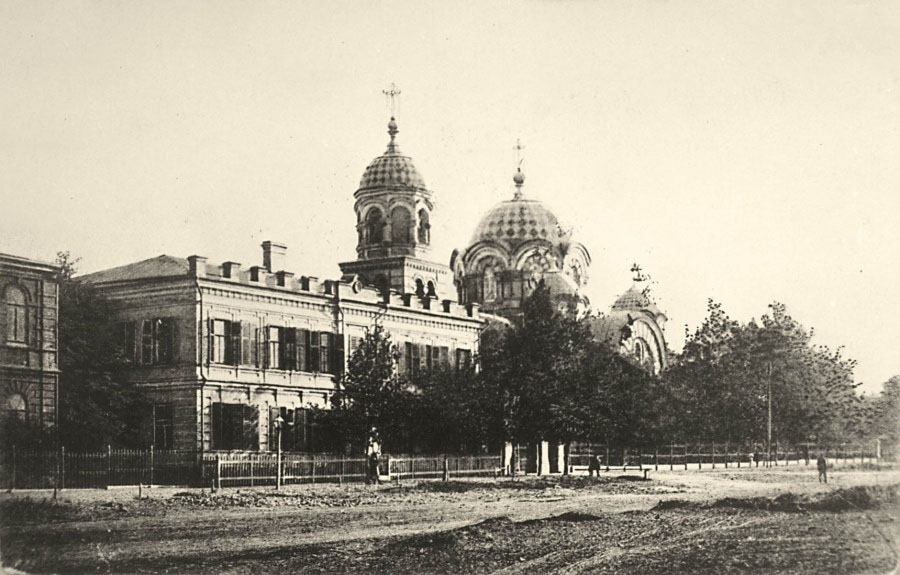
- Petropavlovskaya Poorhouse on a postcard, between 1893 and 1917
- Interactive map of the Petropavlovskaya Poorhouse area

General information
- Type: Poorhouse
- Location: Rostov-on-Don, Russia
- Coordinates: 47°13′15″N 39°42′11″E
- Construction started: 1864
- Completed: late 1860s

Design and construction
- Architect: Senior architect Savitsky

The Petropavlovskaya Poorhouse (Russian: Петропавловская богадельня) was a poorhouse in Rostov-on-Don constructed in the 1860s.

== History and description ==
Andrey Matveyevich Baykov, who was appointed Governor of Rostov-on-Don in 1862, petitioned for the construction of a new poorhouse. The one that existed at that time was small and was situated far from the city. A new poorhouse in the city was anticipated to cost less to maintain, and to increase the influx of donations. On 10 March 1864, the draft and the facade plan of the poorhouse were approved, which were compiled by the senior architect Savitsky. Baykov's petition was approved by the Governor-General of Novorossiisk and Bessarabia in June 1864.

In order to build a poorhouse, a loan of amount of 15 thousand rubles was granted by the Ministry of Finance, with an annual repayment of a thousand rubles. To solve the financial troubles, a city committee was formed, which included Andrey Baykov and other prominent individuals. It was decided to name the poorhouse Petropavlovsksya, in honour of the Governor-General of Novorossiysk and Bessarabia Pavel Yevstafyevich Kotsebu, who contributed to the development of the city and the construction of the poorhouse. Kotsebu also became the Chief Trustee of the Rostov Petropavlovsk Poorhouse.

On 20 September 1864 the construction started. The building was demolished in the 1920s.
