= Temernik =

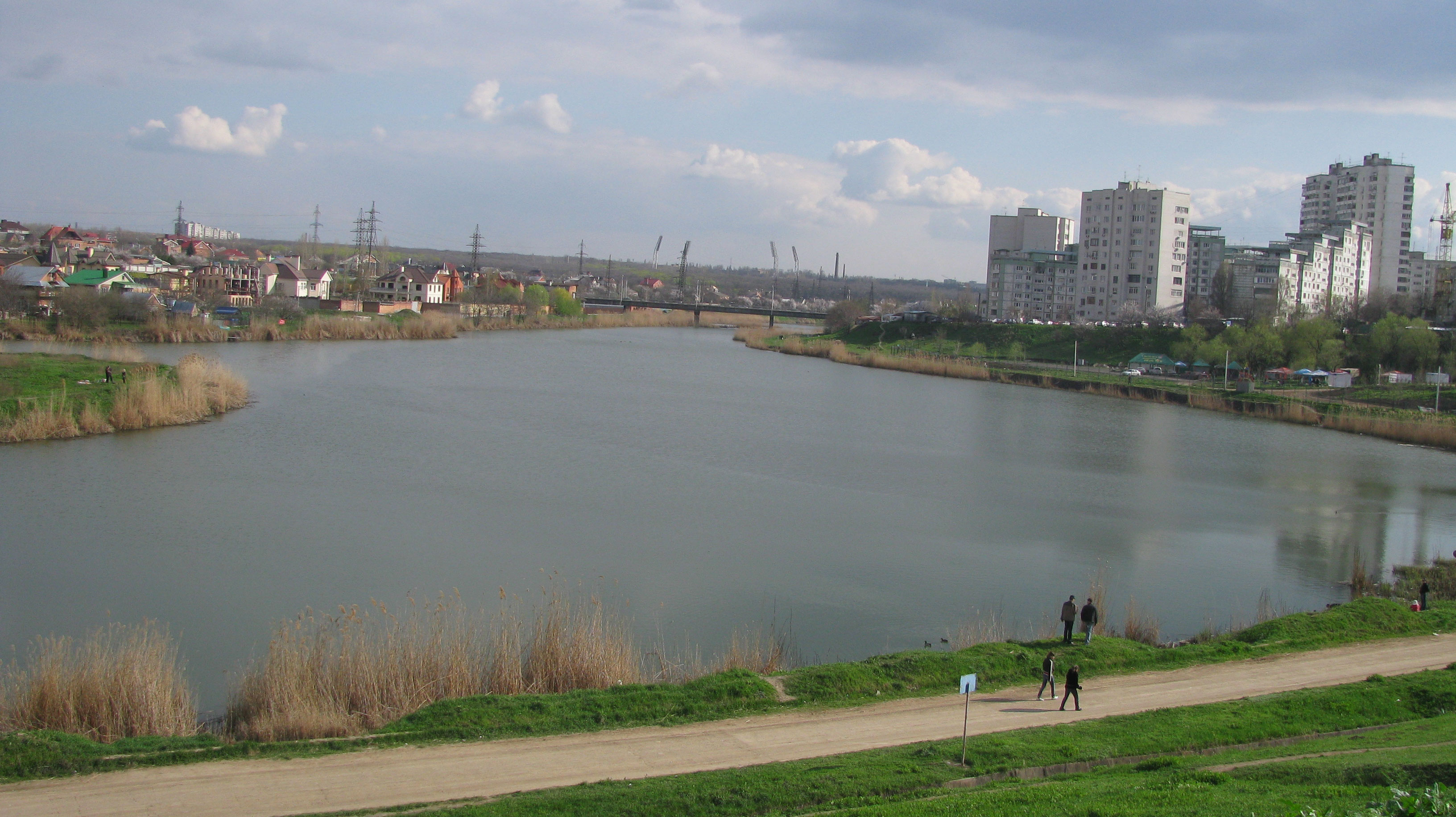
- Temernik in the northern part of Rostov-on-Don

Location
- Country: Russia

Physical characteristics
- Mouth: Don
  - location: Rostov-on-Don
  - coordinates: 47°12′40″N 39°42′05″E
- Length: 33 km (21 mi)
- Basin size: 293 km^{2} (113 sq mi)

Basin features
- Progression: Don→ Sea of Azov

The Temernik (Russian: Темерник, also Temernichka Russian: Темерничка) is a small river in Rostov Oblast of Russia. It is a right tributary of the Don, and is 33 km long, with a drainage basin of 293 km^{2}. Temernik is very polluted.
