= Biryuch =

Biryuch Бирюч
- Town
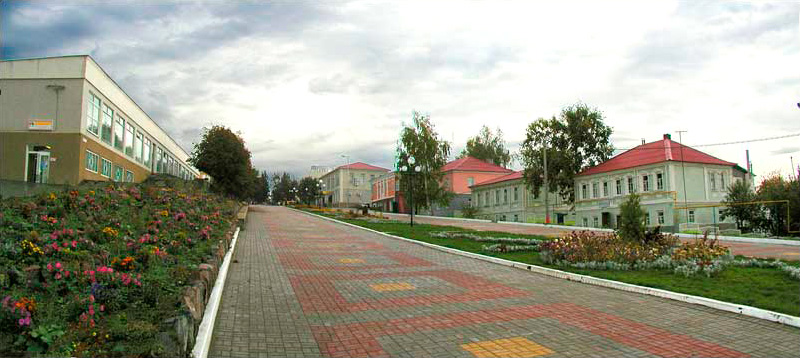
- A pedestrian street in Biryuch

- Flag Coat of arms
- Interactive map of Biryuch
- Location of Biryuch Biryuch (Belgorod Oblast)
- Coordinates: 50°39′N 38°24′E
- Country: Russia
- Federal subject: Belgorod Oblast
- Administrative district: Krasnogvardeysky District
- Founded: March 7, 1705
- Town status since: 2005
- Elevation: 130 m (430 ft)

Population (2010 Census)
  - Total: 7,846
  - Estimate (2021): 7,114 (−9.3%)

Administrative status
  - Capital of: Krasnogvardeysky District

Municipal status
  - Municipal district: Krasnogvardeysky Municipal District
  - Urban settlement: Biryuch Urban Settlement
  - Capital of: Krasnogvardeysky Municipal District, Biryuch Urban Settlement
- Time zone: UTC+3 (MSK)
- Postal code: 309920
- Dialing code: +7 47247
- OKTMO ID: 14642151001
- Website: biryuch.ru

Biryuch (Russian: Бирю́ч) is a town and the administrative center of Krasnogvardeysky District in Belgorod Oblast, Russia, located on the bank of the Tikhaya Sosna River. Its population was 7,114 (2021 census); 7,846 (2010 census); 8,079 (2002 census); 8,526 (1989 Soviet census)..

It was previously known as Biryuchenskoye Komissarstvo (until January 27, 1919), Budyonny (until 1958), Krasnogvardeyskoye (until January 30, 2007).

== History ==
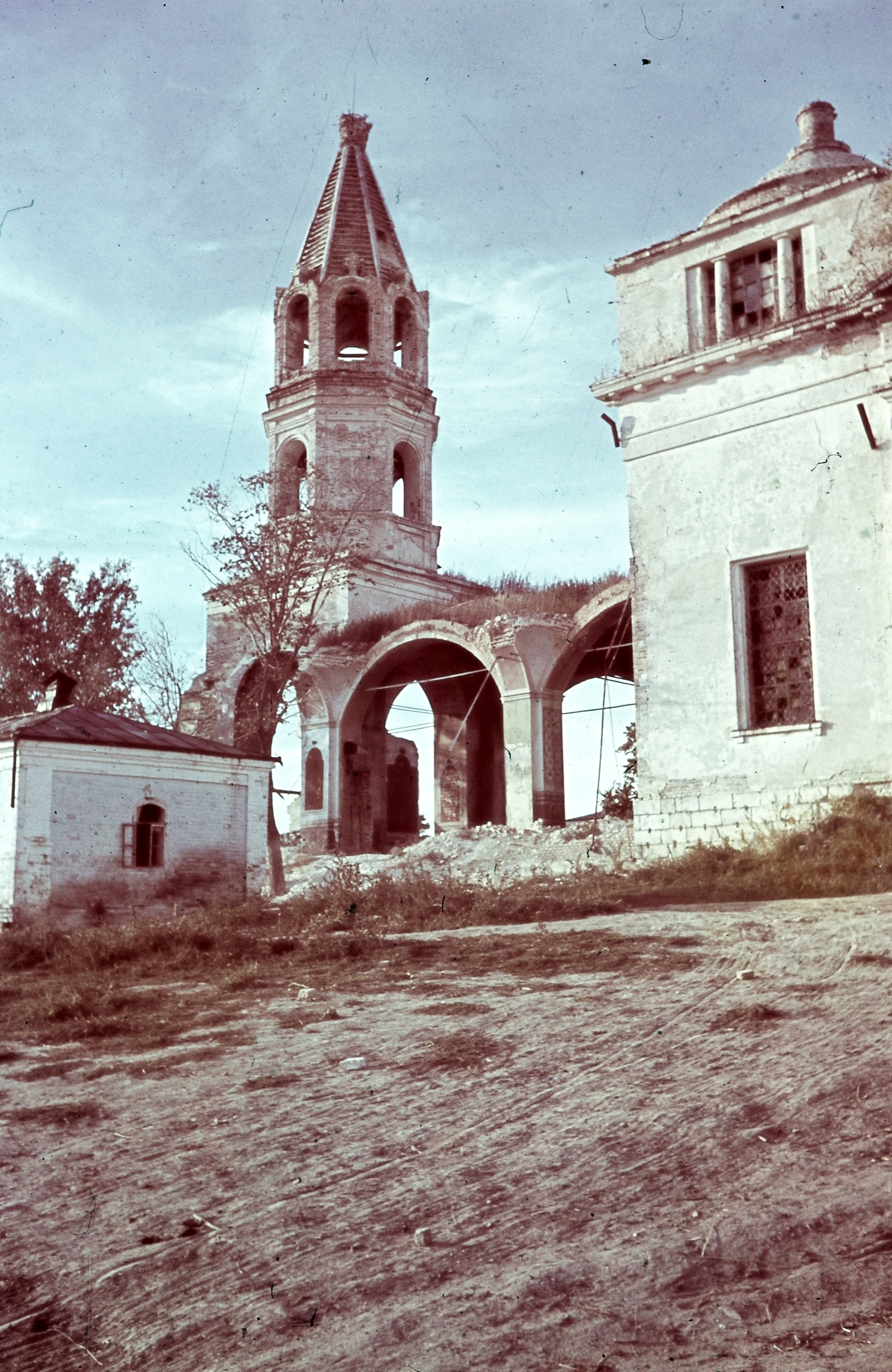
Biryuch in 1942

It was founded on March 7, 1705 by Ivan Medkov, a Cossack sotnik, as Biryuchenskoye Komissarstvo (Бирю́ченское Комисса́рство), and was granted town status in 1779. According to a 1897 census, the town had a population of 13,081, of which 82.3% were Ukrainians, 16.9% were Russians, 0.4% were Jews and 0.16% were Romani. On January 27, 1919, it was renamed Budyonny (Будённый), after Semyon Budyonny. In 1958, it was renamed Krasnogvardeyskoye (Красногварде́йское) and demoted in status to that of a rural locality. It was granted urban-type settlement status in 1975, and in 2005 it was again granted town status. On January 30, 2007, the town's original name of Biryuch was restored.

== Administrative and municipal status ==
Within the framework of administrative divisions, Biryuch serves as the administrative center of Krasnogvardeysky District, to which it is directly subordinated. As a municipal division, the town of Biryuch, together with two rural localities in Krasnogvardeysky District, is incorporated within Krasnogvardeysky Municipal District as Biryuch Urban Settlement.

== Transportation ==
There is a railway station in Biryuch.
