= Krasnogvardeysky District, Belgorod Oblast =

Krasnogvardeysky District Красногвардейский район (Russian)
- District
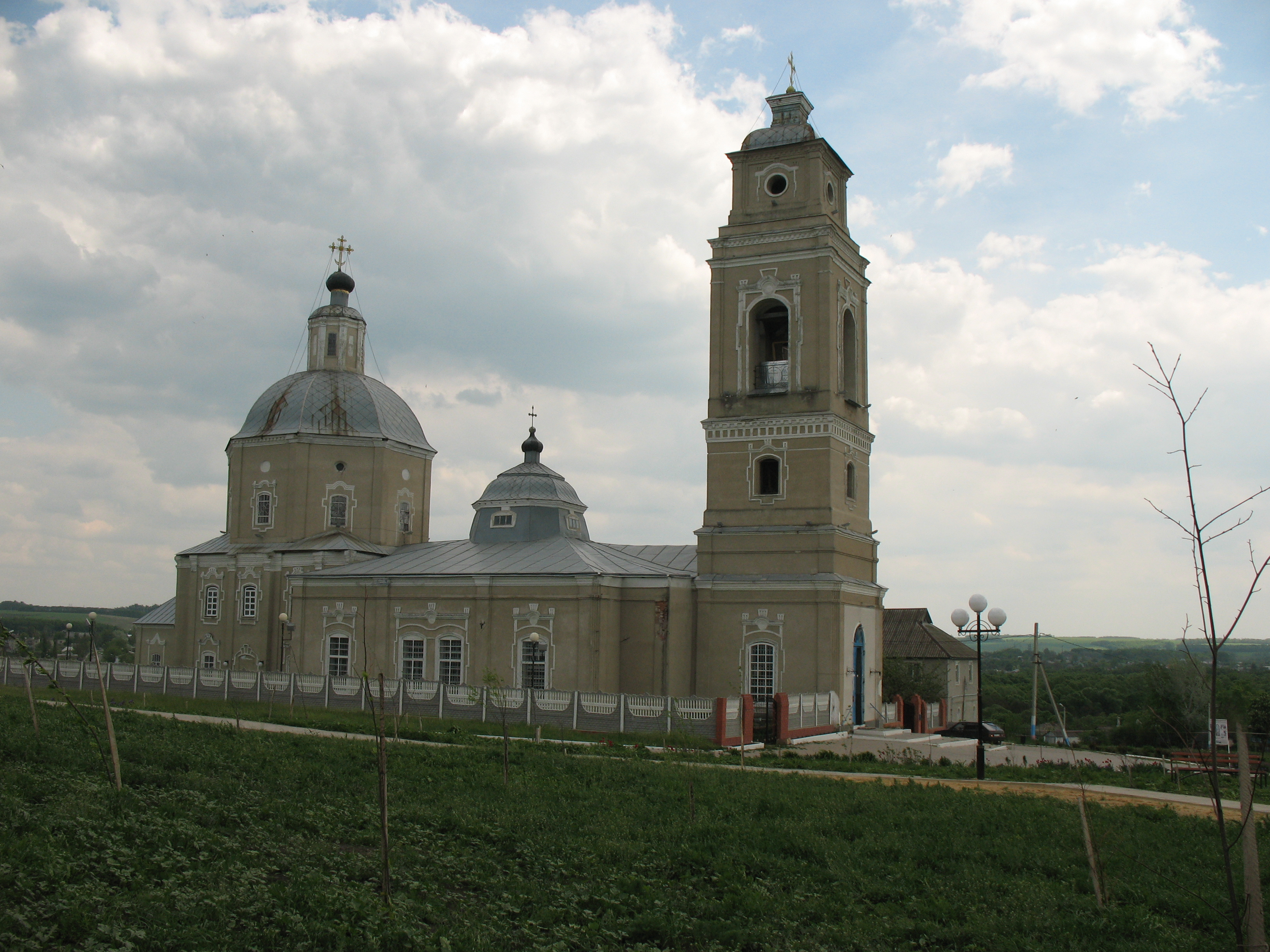
- Church in Krasnogvardeysky District

- Flag Coat of arms
- Location of Krasnogvardeysky District in Belgorod Oblast
- Coordinates: 50°39′N 38°24′E
- Country: Russia
- Federal subject: Belgorod Oblast
- Established: July 1928
- Administrative center: Biryuch

Area
  - Total: 1,762.6 km^{2} (680.5 sq mi)

Population (2010 Census)
  - Total: 40,636
  - Density: 23.055/km^{2} (59.711/sq mi)
  - Urban: 19.3%
  - Rural: 80.7%

Administrative structure
  - Inhabited localities: 1 urban-type settlements, 85 rural localities

Municipal structure
  - Municipally incorporated as: Krasnogvardeysky Municipal District
  - Municipal divisions: 1 urban settlements, 14 rural settlements
- Time zone: UTC+3 (MSK)
- OKTMO ID: 14642000
- Website: http://www.biryuch.ru/

Krasnogvardeysky District (Russian: Красногварде́йский райо́н) is an administrative district (raion), one of the twenty-one in Belgorod Oblast, Russia. Municipally, it is incorporated as Krasnogvardeysky Municipal District. It is located in the eastern central part of the oblast. The area of the district is 1,762.6 square kilometers (680.5 sq mi). Its administrative center is the town of Biryuch. Population: 32,242 (2021 census); 40,636 (2010 census); 44,156 (2002 Census); 47,916 (1989 Soviet census). The population of Biryuch accounts for 22.1% of the district's total population.

== History ==
The district was established in July 1928.
