= Alexeyevsky District, Belgorod Oblast =

Alexeyevsky District Алексеевский район (Russian)
- District
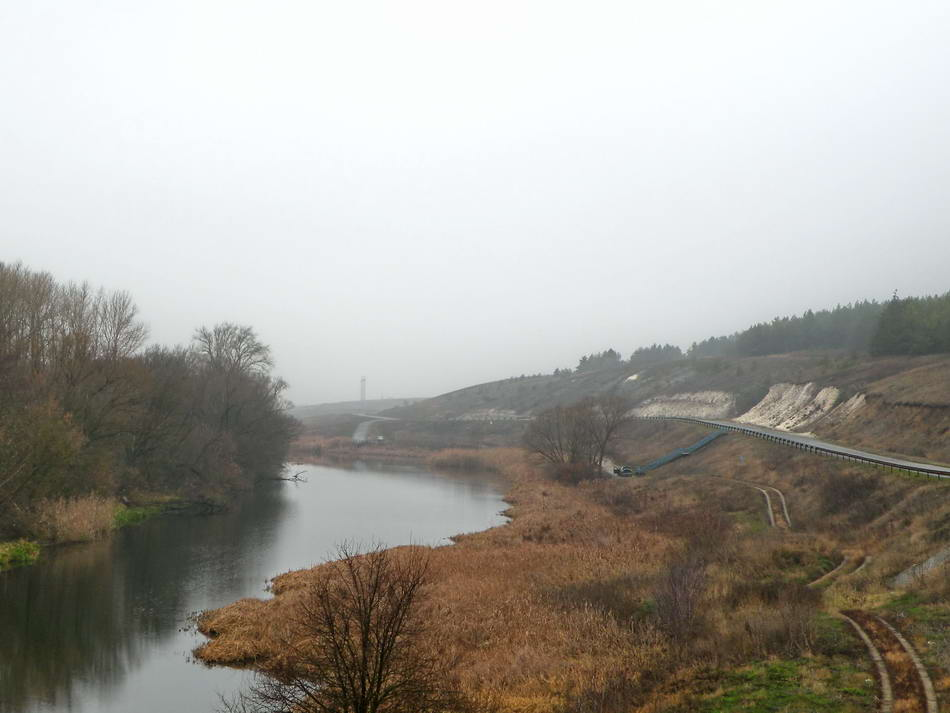
- Scene in Aleexeyasky District

- Flag Coat of arms
- Location of Alexeyevsky District in Belgorod Oblast
- Coordinates: 50°38′N 38°41′E
- Country: Russia
- Federal subject: Belgorod Oblast
- Established: 1928
- Administrative center: Alexeyevka

Area
  - Total: 1,765 km^{2} (681 sq mi)

Population (2010 Census)
  - Total: 25,425
  - Estimate (2018): 61,370 (+141.4%)
  - Density: 14.41/km^{2} (37.31/sq mi)
  - Urban: 0%
  - Rural: 100%

Administrative structure
  - Inhabited localities: 89 rural localities

Municipal structure
  - Municipally incorporated as: Alexeyevsky Municipal District
  - Municipal divisions: 1 urban settlements, 20 rural settlements
- Time zone: UTC+3 (MSK)
- OKTMO ID: 14605000
- Website: http://www.adm-alekseevka.ru/adm/

Alexeyevsky District (Russian: Алексе́евский райо́н) is an administrative district (raion), one of the twenty-one in Belgorod Oblast, Russia. As a municipal division, it is incorporated as Alexeyevsky Municipal District. It is located in the east of the oblast. The area of the district is 1,765 square kilometers (681 sq mi). Its administrative center is the town of Alexeyevka (which is not administratively a part of the district). Population: 24,425 (2010 census); 27,493 (2002 Census); 45,304 (1989 Soviet census).

== Geography ==
Alexeyevsky District sits on the eastern edge of Belgorod Oblast, on the border with Voronezh Oblast. It is bordered on the south by Veydelevsky District and Roveskoy District, on the west by Krasnogvardeysky District, on the north by Krasnensky District, and on the east by three districts in Voronezh Oblast: Kamensky District, Olhovatsky District, and Ostrogozhsky District. The administrative center of the district is the town of Alexeyevka, which occupies 40 square kilometres (15 sq mi) in the north-central region of the district (of which the town itself is not part). the district is 300 kilometres (190 mi) east of the city of Belgorod.

The terrain is steppe and hilly plain; the district lies on the southeast edge of the Central Russian Upland. The two main rivers through the district are the Tikhaya Sosna River, which runs northeast into Voronezh Oblast and into the Don River basin, and the Chyornaya Kalitva River, another right tributary of the Don. Because it is in Central Black Earth area, Alexeyevsky has soil and climate suited to agriculture.

== Administrative and municipal status ==
Within the framework of administrative divisions, Alexeyevsky District is one of the twenty-one in the oblast. The town of Alexeyevka serves as its administrative center, despite being incorporated separately as a town of oblast significance—an administrative unit with the status equal to that of the districts.

As a municipal division, the district is incorporated as Alexeyevsky Municipal District, with the town of oblast significance of Alexeyevka being incorporated within it as Alexeyevka Urban Settlement.
