= Alexeyevka, Belgorod Oblast =

Town in Belgorod Oblast, Russia

Alexeyevka Алексеевка
- Town
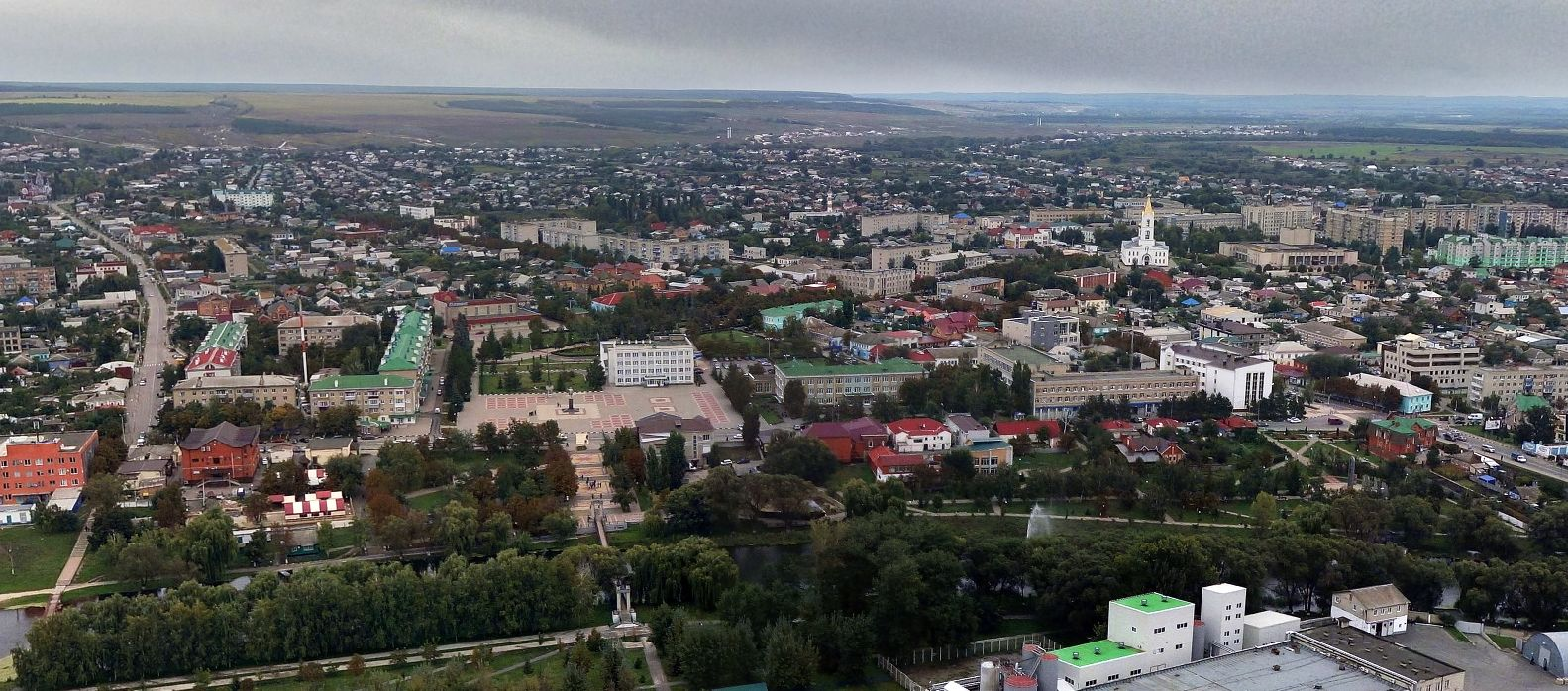

- Flag Coat of arms
- Interactive map of Alexeyevka
- Location of Alexeyevka Alexeyevka (European Russia) Alexeyevka (Russia)
- Coordinates: 50°38′N 38°42′E
- Country: Russia
- Federal subject: Belgorod Oblast
- Founded: 1685
- Town status since: 1954
- Elevation: 120 m (390 ft)

Population
  - Estimate (2026): ~35,500 )

Administrative status
  - Subordinated to: town of oblast significance of Alexeyevka
  - Capital of: town of oblast significance of Alexeyevka, Alexeyevsky District

Municipal status
  - Municipal district: Alexeyevsky Municipal District
  - Urban settlement: Alexeyevka Urban Settlement
  - Capital of: Alexeyevsky Municipal District, Alexeyevka Urban Settlement
- Time zone: UTC+3 (MSK)
- Postal code: 309850
- OKTMO ID: 14710000001

Alexeyevka (Russian: Алексе́евка; Ukrainian: Алексєєвка) is a town in Belgorod Oblast, Russia, located on the Tikhaya Sosna River (Don's basin) 306 kilometers (190 mi) east of Belgorod. Population: 36,578 (2021 census); 39,026 (2010 census); 39,312 (2002 census); 36,641 (1989 Soviet census). It is located in the historic region of Sloboda Ukraine.

== History ==
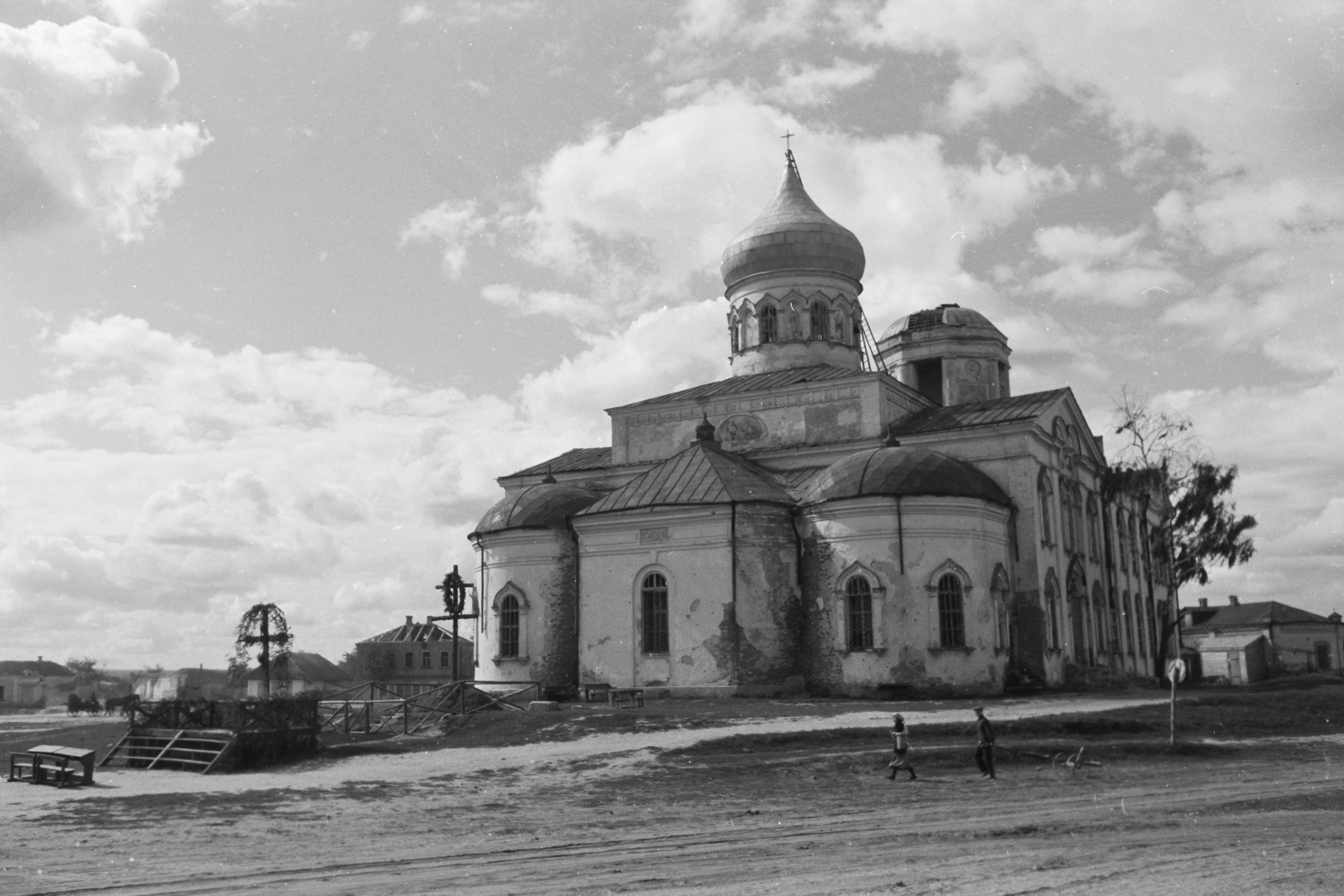
Holy Trinity Cathedral in 1942

It was founded by Ukrainian Cossacks from Bohuslav in 1685 as Alexeyevka (or Alexeyevskaya) sloboda, named after Alexey Cherkassky, its first owner. It was administratively located in the Ostrogozhsk Regiment of Sloboda Ukraine until 1765. The settlement suffered a fire in 1826 and cholera epidemics in 1831, 1847, and 1892. A horse-drawn oil mill was built in 1833, and then a steam-powered oil mill was built in 1886. In 1895, a railway station was opened on the line. In 1897, it had some 13,600 mainly Ukrainian inhabitants.

In 1918, it was part of the Ukrainian State, and then passed to the Soviets. According to the 1926 census, Ukrainians made up 64.5% of the population. During World War II, Alexeyevka was occupied by the German Army from 1942 until 1943. Town status was granted in 1954.

== Administrative and municipal status ==
Within the framework of administrative divisions, Alexeyevka serves as the administrative center of Alexeyevsky District, even though it is not a part of it. As an administrative division, it is incorporated separately as the town of oblast significance of Alexeyevka—an administrative unit with the status equal to that of the districts. As a municipal division, the town of oblast significance of Alexeyevka is incorporated within Alexeyevsky Municipal District as Alexeyevka Urban Settlement.

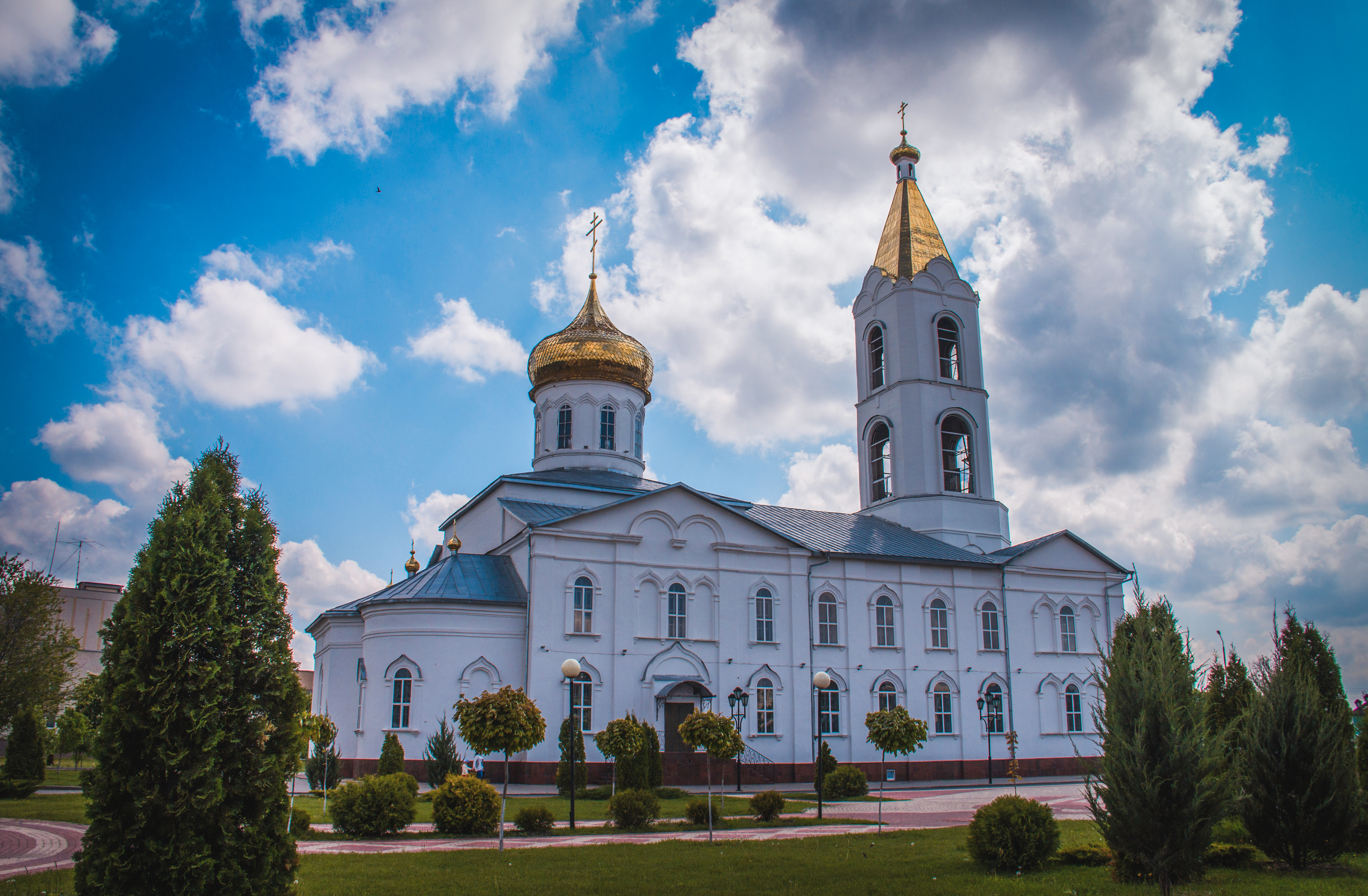
Holy Trinity Cathedral

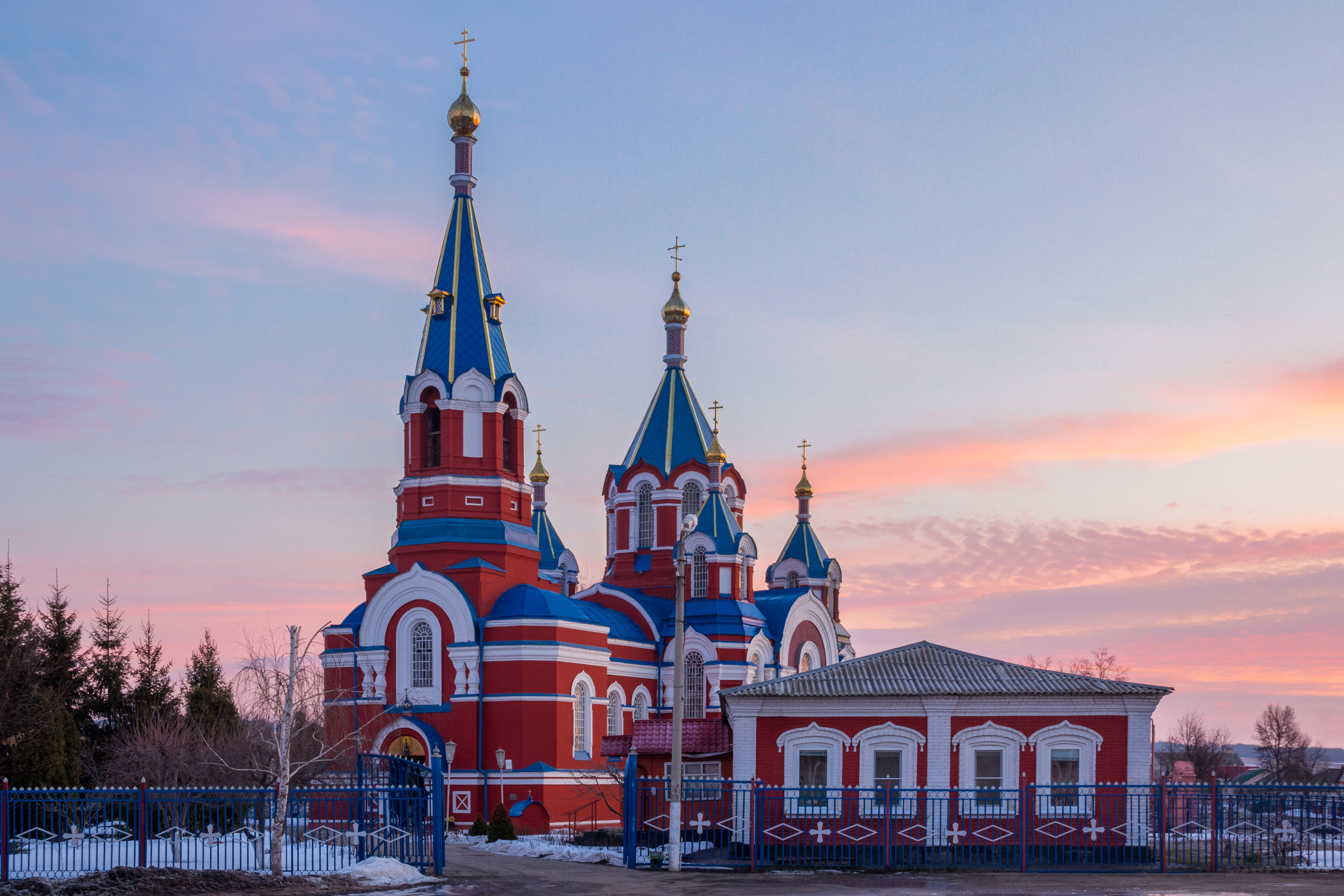
Saint Demetrius Church

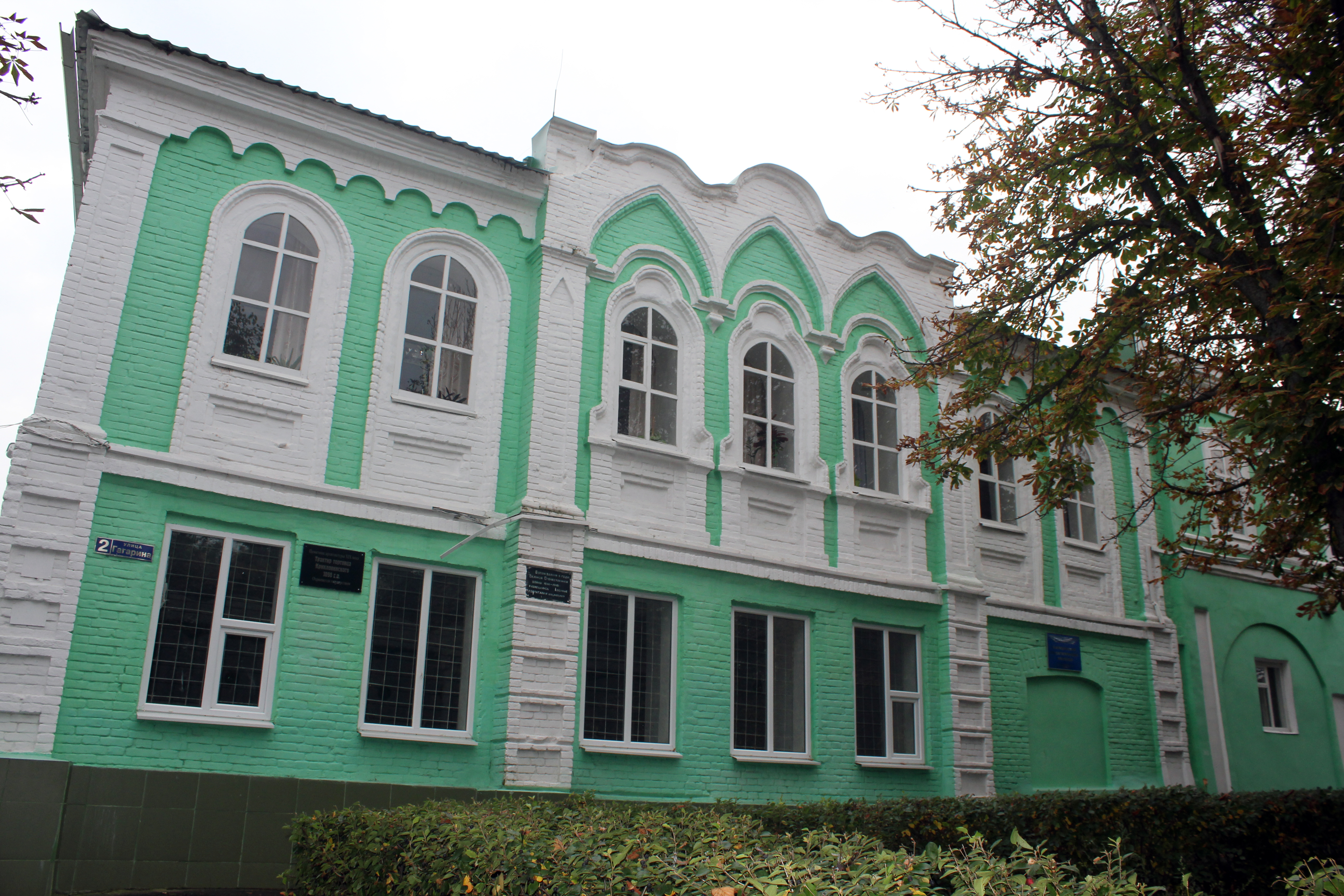
Former merchant's tavern

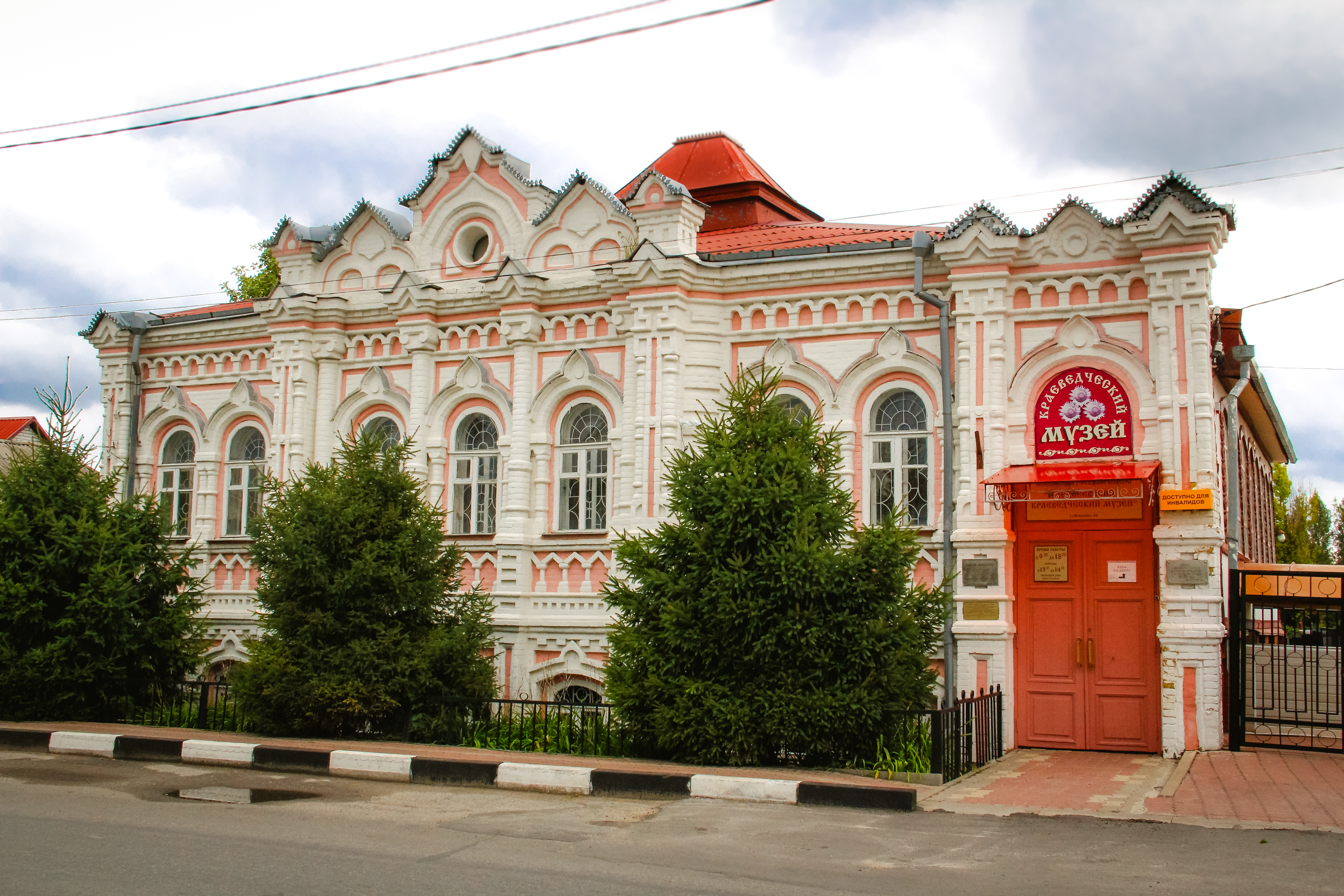
Local museum
