= Borisovka =

Borisovka (Russian: Бори́совка) is the name of several inhabited localities in Russia.

== Altai Krai ==
As of 2010, two rural localities in Altai Krai bear this name:

- Borisovka, Uglovsky District, Altai Krai, a selo in Laptevsky Selsoviet of Uglovsky District
- Borisovka, Yegoryevsky District, Altai Krai, a selo in Kruglo-Sementsovsky Selsoviet of Yegoryevsky District

== Republic of Bashkortostan ==
As of 2010, three rural localities in the Republic of Bashkortostan bear this name:

- Borisovka, Aurgazinsky District, Republic of Bashkortostan, a village in Ibrayevsky Selsoviet of Aurgazinsky District
- Borisovka, Sharansky District, Republic of Bashkortostan, a village in Michurinsky Selsoviet of Sharansky District
- Borisovka, Sterlibashevsky District, Republic of Bashkortostan, a village in Bakeyevsky Selsoviet of Sterlibashevsky District

== Belgorod Oblast ==
As of 2013, four inhabited localities in Belgorod Oblast bear this name:

Urban localities

- Borisovka, Borisovsky District, Belgorod Oblast, a settlement in Borisovsky District

Rural localities

- Borisovka, Krasnogvardeysky District, Belgorod Oblast, a khutor in Krasnogvardeysky District
- Borisovka, Shebekinsky District, Belgorod Oblast, a selo in Shebekinsky District
- Borisovka, Volokonovsky District, Belgorod Oblast, a selo in Borisovsky Rural Okrug of Volokonovsky District

== Chelyabinsk Oblast ==
As of 2010, three rural localities in Chelyabinsk Oblast bear this name:

- Borisovka, Kunashaksky District, Chelyabinsk Oblast, a village in Kunashaksky Selsoviet of Kunashaksky District
- Borisovka, Plastovsky District, Chelyabinsk Oblast, a selo in Borisovsky Selsoviet of Plastovsky District
- Borisovka, Yemanzhelinsky District, Chelyabinsk Oblast, a settlement under the administrative jurisdiction of the town of Yemanzhelinsk, Yemanzhelinsky District

== Ivanovo Oblast ==
As of 2010, one rural locality in Ivanovo Oblast bears this name:

- Borisovka, Ivanovo Oblast, a village in Palekhsky District

== Kaluga Oblast ==
As of 2010, one rural locality in Kaluga Oblast bears this name:

- Borisovka, Kaluga Oblast, a village in Peremyshlsky District

== Kostroma Oblast ==
As of 2010, one rural locality in Kostroma Oblast bears this name:

- Borisovka, Kostroma Oblast, a village in Chapayevskoye Settlement of Krasnoselsky District

== Krasnodar Krai ==
As of 2010, one rural locality in Krasnodar Krai bears this name:

- Borisovka, Krasnodar Krai, a selo in Primorsky Rural Okrug under the administrative jurisdiction of the City of Novorossiysk

== Kursk Oblast ==
As of 2010, three rural localities in Kursk Oblast bear this name:

- Borisovka, Khomutovsky District, Kursk Oblast, a village in Maleyevsky Selsoviet of Khomutovsky District
- Borisovka, Lgovsky District, Kursk Oblast, a selo in Borisovsky Selsoviet of Lgovsky District
- Borisovka, Shchigrovsky District, Kursk Oblast, a village in Okhochevsky Selsoviet of Shchigrovsky District

== Lipetsk Oblast ==
As of 2010, one rural locality in Lipetsk Oblast bears this name:

- Borisovka, Lipetsk Oblast, a selo in Borisovsky Selsoviet of Dobrovsky District

== Moscow Oblast ==
As of 2010, three rural localities in Moscow Oblast bear this name:

- Borisovka, Podolsky District, Moscow Oblast, a village in Strelkovskoye Rural Settlement of Podolsky District
- Borisovka, Shakhovskoy District, Moscow Oblast, a village in Stepankovskoye Rural Settlement of Shakhovskoy District
- Borisovka, Shchyolkovsky District, Moscow Oblast, a village in Trubinskoye Rural Settlement of Shchyolkovsky District

== Nizhny Novgorod Oblast ==
As of 2010, four rural localities in Nizhny Novgorod Oblast bear this name:

- Borisovka, Bor, Nizhny Novgorod Oblast, a village in Sitnikovsky Selsoviet of the city of oblast significance of Bor
- Borisovka, Sechenovsky District, Nizhny Novgorod Oblast, a village in Verkhnetalyzinsky Selsoviet of Sechenovsky District
- Borisovka, Sergachsky District, Nizhny Novgorod Oblast, a selo in Andreyevsky Selsoviet of Sergachsky District
- Borisovka, Voskresensky District, Nizhny Novgorod Oblast, a village in Bogorodsky Selsoviet of Voskresensky District

== Novgorod Oblast ==
As of 2010, one rural locality in Novgorod Oblast bears this name:

- Borisovka, Novgorod Oblast, a village in Okhonskoye Settlement of Pestovsky District

== Omsk Oblast ==
As of 2010, one rural locality in Omsk Oblast bears this name:

- Borisovka, Omsk Oblast, a village in Staromalinovsky Rural Okrug of Nizhneomsky District

== Orenburg Oblast ==
As of 2010, one rural locality in Orenburg Oblast bears this name:

- Borisovka, Orenburg Oblast, a selo in Borisovsky Selsoviet of Ponomaryovsky District

== Oryol Oblast ==
As of 2010, two rural localities in Oryol Oblast bear this name:

- Borisovka, Kromskoy District, Oryol Oblast, a village in Gostomlsky Selsoviet of Kromskoy District
- Borisovka, Sverdlovsky District, Oryol Oblast, a village in Krasnoarmeysky Selsoviet of Sverdlovsky District

== Penza Oblast ==
As of 2010, one rural locality in Penza Oblast bears this name:

- Borisovka, Penza Oblast, a village in Pavlo-Kurakinsky Selsoviet of Gorodishchensky District

== Primorsky Krai ==
As of 2010, one rural locality in Primorsky Krai bears this name:

- Borisovka, Primorsky Krai, a selo under the administrative jurisdiction of Ussuriysk City Under Krai Jurisdiction

== Pskov Oblast ==
As of 2010, one rural locality in Pskov Oblast bears this name:

- Borisovka, Pskov Oblast, a village in Pechorsky District

== Rostov Oblast ==
As of 2010, one rural locality in Rostov Oblast bears this name:

- Borisovka, Rostov Oblast, a khutor in Skosyrskoye Rural Settlement of Tatsinsky District

== Ryazan Oblast ==
As of 2010, two rural localities in Ryazan Oblast bear this name:

- Borisovka, Alexandro-Nevsky District, Ryazan Oblast, a village in Borisovsky Rural Okrug of Alexandro-Nevsky District
- Borisovka, Ukholovsky District, Ryazan Oblast, a village in Yasenovsky Rural Okrug of Ukholovsky District

== Saratov Oblast ==
As of 2010, one rural locality in Saratov Oblast bears this name:

- Borisovka, Saratov Oblast, a selo in Bazarno-Karabulaksky District

== Smolensk Oblast ==
As of 2010, one rural locality in Smolensk Oblast bears this name:

- Borisovka, Smolensk Oblast, a village in Novoselskoye Rural Settlement of Smolensky District

== Tambov Oblast ==
As of 2010, two rural localities in Tambov Oblast bear this name:

- Borisovka, Mordovsky District, Tambov Oblast, a selo in Karpelsky Selsoviet of Mordovsky District
- Borisovka, Petrovsky District, Tambov Oblast, a village in Krutovsky Selsoviet of Petrovsky District

== Tula Oblast ==
As of 2010, three rural localities in Tula Oblast bear this name:

- Borisovka, Belyovsky District, Tula Oblast, a village in Novodoletsky Rural Okrug of Belyovsky District
- Borisovka, Shchyokinsky District, Tula Oblast, a village in Kostomarovskaya Rural Administration of Shchyokinsky District
- Borisovka, Tyoplo-Ogaryovsky District, Tula Oblast, a village in Bolshe-Ogarevsky Rural Okrug of Tyoplo-Ogaryovsky District

== Tver Oblast ==
As of 2010, two rural localities in Tver Oblast bear this name:

- Borisovka, Selizharovsky District, Tver Oblast, a village in Selizharovsky District
- Borisovka, Toropetsky District, Tver Oblast, a village in Toropetsky District

== Tyumen Oblast ==
As of 2010, one rural locality in Tyumen Oblast bears this name:

- Borisovka, Tyumen Oblast, a village in Butusovsky Rural Okrug of Ishimsky District

== Ulyanovsk Oblast ==
As of 2010, one rural locality in Ulyanovsk Oblast bears this name:

- Borisovka, Ulyanovsk Oblast, a settlement in Bryandinsky Rural Okrug of Cherdaklinsky District

== Vladimir Oblast ==
As of 2010, one rural locality in Vladimir Oblast bears this name:

- Borisovka, Vladimir Oblast, a village in Yuryev-Polsky District

== Yaroslavl Oblast ==
As of 2010, three rural localities in Yaroslavl Oblast bear this name:

- Borisovka, Breytovsky District, Yaroslavl Oblast, a village in Filimonovsky Rural Okrug of Breytovsky District
- Borisovka, Myshkinsky District, Yaroslavl Oblast, a village in Bogorodsky Rural Okrug of Myshkinsky District
- Borisovka, Rybinsky District, Yaroslavl Oblast, a village in Nazarovsky Rural Okrug of Rybinsky District
