= Kuganakbash =

Kuganakbash Куганакбаш
- Selo
- Location within Bashkortostan Location within Russia
- Coordinates: 53°34′N 55°21′E
- Country: Russia
- Region: Bashkortostan
- District: Sterlibashevsky District
- Time zone: UTC+5:00

Kuganakbash (Russian: Куганакбаш; Bashkir: Ҡуғанаҡбаш, Quğanaqbaş) is a rural locality (a selo) and the administrative centre of Kuganakbashevsky Selsoviet, Sterlibashevsky District, Bashkortostan, Russia. The population was 835 as of 2010. There are 10 streets.

== Geography ==
Kuganakbash is located 22 km northeast of Sterlibashevo (the district's administrative centre) by road. Yumaguzino is the nearest rural locality.
