= Pervomaysky, Sterlibashevsky District, Republic of Bashkortostan =

Pervomaysky Первомайский
- Selo
- Location within Bashkortostan Location within Russia
- Coordinates: 53°27′N 55°17′E
- Country: Russia
- Region: Bashkortostan
- District: Sterlibashevsky District
- Time zone: UTC+5:00

Pervomaysky (Russian: Первомайский) is a rural locality (a selo) in Sterlibashevsky Selsoviet, Sterlibashevsky District, Bashkortostan, Russia. The population was 716 as of 2010. There are 10 streets.

== Geography ==
Pervomaysky is located 4 km northeast of Sterlibashevo (the district's administrative centre) by road. Sterlibashevo is the nearest rural locality.
