= Kabakush =

Kabakush Кабакуш
- Selo
- Location within Bashkortostan Location within Russia
- Coordinates: 53°16′N 55°20′E
- Country: Russia
- Region: Bashkortostan
- District: Sterlibashevsky District
- Time zone: UTC+5:00

Kabakush (Russian: Кабакуш; Bashkir: Ҡабыҡҡыуыш, Qabıqqıwış) is a rural locality (a selo) and the administrative centre of Kabakushsky Selsoviet, Sterlibashevsky District, Bashkortostan, Russia. The population was 589 as of 2010. There are 14 streets.

== Geography ==
Kabakush is located 23 km south of Sterlibashevo (the district's administrative centre) by road. Novy Mir is the nearest rural locality.
