= Umetbayevo, Sterlibashevsky District, Bashkortostan =

Umetbayevo Уметбаево
- Village
- Location within Bashkortostan Location within Russia
- Coordinates: 53°22′N 55°39′E
- Country: Russia
- Region: Bashkortostan
- District: Sterlibashevsky District
- Time zone: UTC+5:00

Umetbayevo (Russian: Уметбаево; Bashkir: Өмөтбай, Ömötbay) is a rural locality (a village) in Saraysinsky Selsoviet, Sterlibashevsky District, Bashkortostan, Russia. The population was 113 as of 2010. There are 4 streets.

== Geography ==
Umetbayevo is located 43 km southeast of Sterlibashevo (the district's administrative centre) by road. Yelmbetovo is the nearest rural locality.
