= Yumaguzino, Sterlibashevsky District, Republic of Bashkortostan =

Yumaguzino Юмагузино
- Village
- Location within Bashkortostan Location within Russia
- Coordinates: 53°32′N 55°18′E
- Country: Russia
- Region: Bashkortostan
- District: Sterlibashevsky District
- Time zone: UTC+5:00

Yumaguzino (Russian: Юмагузино; Bashkir: Йомағужа, Yomağuja) is a rural locality (a village) in Kuganakbashevsky Selsoviet, Sterlibashevsky District, Bashkortostan, Russia. The population was 164 as of 2010. There are 4 streets.

== Geography ==
Yumaguzino is located 20 km northeast of Sterlibashevo (the district's administrative centre) by road. Novoivanovka is the nearest rural locality.
