= Rodionovka, Republic of Bashkortostan =

Rodionovka Родионовка
- Village
- Location within Bashkortostan Location within Russia
- Coordinates: 53°24′N 55°04′E
- Country: Russia
- Region: Bashkortostan
- District: Sterlibashevsky District
- Time zone: UTC+5:00

Rodionovka (Russian: Родионовка) is a rural locality (a village) in Aydaralinsky Selsoviet, Sterlibashevsky District, Bashkortostan, Russia. The population was 16 as of 2010. There is 1 street.

== Geography ==
Rodionovka is located 16 km southwest of Sterlibashevo (the district's administrative centre) by road. Ivanovka is the nearest rural locality.
