= Buzat, Sterlibashevsky District, Republic of Bashkortostan =

Buzat Бузат
- Selo
- Location within Bashkortostan Location within Russia
- Coordinates: 53°18′N 54°41′E
- Country: Russia
- Region: Bashkortostan
- District: Sterlibashevsky District
- Time zone: UTC+5:00

Buzat (Russian: Бузат; Bashkir: Буҙат, Buźat) is a rural locality (a selo) and the administrative centre of Buzatovsky Selsoviet, Sterlibashevsky District, Bashkortostan, Russia. The population was 722 as of 2010. There are 9 streets.

== Geography ==
Buzat is located 46 km southwest of Sterlibashevo (the district's administrative centre) by road. Maly Buzat is the nearest rural locality.
