= Nizhny Allaguvat =

Nizhny Allaguvat Нижний Аллагуват
- Village
- Location within Bashkortostan Location within Russia
- Coordinates: 53°13′N 55°31′E
- Country: Russia
- Region: Bashkortostan
- District: Sterlibashevsky District
- Time zone: UTC+5:00

Nizhny Allaguvat (Russian: Нижний Аллагуват; Bashkir: Түбәнге Аллағыуат, Tübänge Allağıwat) is a rural locality (a village) and the administrative centre of Allaguvatsky Selsoviet, Sterlibashevsky District, Bashkortostan, Russia. The population was 295 as of 2010. There are 4 streets.

== Geography ==
Nizhny Allaguvat is located 36 km southeast of Sterlibashevo (the district's administrative centre) by road. Verkhny Allaguvat is the nearest rural locality.
