= Lugavushka =

Lugavushka Лугавушка
- Village
- Location within Bashkortostan Location within Russia
- Coordinates: 53°28′N 55°29′E
- Country: Russia
- Region: Bashkortostan
- District: Sterlibashevsky District
- Time zone: UTC+5:00

Lugavushka (Russian: Лугавушка) is a rural locality (a village) in Starokalkashevsky Selsoviet, Sterlibashevsky District, Bashkortostan, Russia. The population was 2 as of 2010. There is 1 street.

== Geography ==
Lugavushka is located 20 km east of Sterlibashevo (the district's administrative centre) by road. Korneyevka is the nearest rural locality.
