= Yasherganovo =

Yasherganovo Яшерганово
- Selo
- Location within Bashkortostan Location within Russia
- Coordinates: 53°19′N 54°50′E
- Country: Russia
- Region: Bashkortostan
- District: Sterlibashevsky District
- Time zone: UTC+5:00

Yasherganovo (Russian: Яшерганово; Bashkir: Йәшергән, Yäşergän) is a rural locality (a selo) and the administrative centre of Yasherganovsky Selsoviet, Sterlibashevsky District, Bashkortostan, Russia. The population was 620 as of 2010. There are 8 streets.

== Geography ==
Yasherganovo is located 35 km southwest of Sterlibashevo (the district's administrative centre) by road. Nizhneibrayevo is the nearest rural locality.
