= Novy Mir, Sterlibashevsky District, Republic of Bashkortostan =

Novy Mir Новый Мир
- Village
- Location within Bashkortostan Location within Russia
- Coordinates: 53°16′N 55°18′E
- Country: Russia
- Region: Bashkortostan
- District: Sterlibashevsky District
- Time zone: UTC+5:00

Novy Mir (Russian: Новый Мир) is a rural locality (a village) in Kabakushsky Selsoviet, Sterlibashevsky District, Bashkortostan, Russia. The population was 28 as of 2010. There is 1 street.

== Geography ==
Novy Mir is located 23 km south of Sterlibashevo (the district's administrative centre) by road. Kabakush is the nearest rural locality.
