= Akulinovka =

Akulinovka Акулиновка
- Selo
- Location within Belgorod Oblast Location within Russia
- Coordinates: 50°38′N 35°51′E
- Country: Russia
- Region: Belgorod Oblast
- District: Borisovsky District
- Time zone: UTC+3:00

Akulinovka (Russian: Акулиновка) is a rural locality (a selo) and the administrative center of Akulinovskoye Rural Settlement, Borisovsky District, Belgorod Oblast, Russia. The population was 462 as of 2010. There are 6 streets.

== Geography ==
Akulinovka is located 22 km northwest of Borisovka (the district's administrative centre) by road. Kulinovka is the nearest rural locality.
