= Karamaly-Buzat =

Karamaly-Buzat Карамалы-Бузат
- Village
- Location within Bashkortostan Location within Russia
- Coordinates: 53°14′N 54°40′E
- Country: Russia
- Region: Bashkortostan
- District: Sterlibashevsky District
- Time zone: UTC+5:00

Karamaly-Buzat (Russian: Карамалы-Бузат; Bashkir: Ҡарамалы-Буҙат, Qaramalı-Buźat) is a rural locality (a village) in Buzatovsky Selsoviet, Sterlibashevsky District, Bashkortostan, Russia. The population was 10 as of 2010. There are 2 streets.

== Geography ==
Karamaly-Buzat is located 54 km southwest of Sterlibashevo (the district's administrative centre) by road. Galey-Buzat is the nearest rural locality.
