= Sary-Yelga =

Sary-Yelga Сары-Елга
- Village
- Location within Bashkortostan Location within Russia
- Coordinates: 53°21′N 55°15′E
- Country: Russia
- Region: Bashkortostan
- District: Sterlibashevsky District
- Time zone: UTC+5:00

Sary-Yelga (Russian: Сары-Елга; Bashkir: Һарыйылға, Harıyılğa) is a rural locality (a village) in Khalikeyevsky Selsoviet, Sterlibashevsky District, Bashkortostan, Russia. The population was 6 as of 2010. There is 1 street.

== Geography ==
Sary-Yelga is located 10 km south of Sterlibashevo (the district's administrative centre) by road. Khalikeyevo is the nearest rural locality.
