= Maxyutovo, Sterlibashevsky District, Republic of Bashkortostan =

Maxyutovo Максютово
- Village
- Location within Bashkortostan Location within Russia
- Coordinates: 53°27′N 55°18′E
- Country: Russia
- Region: Bashkortostan
- District: Sterlibashevsky District
- Time zone: UTC+5:00

Maxyutovo (Russian: Максютово; Bashkir: Мәҡсүт, Mäqsüt) is a rural locality (a village) in Sterlibashevsky Selsoviet, Sterlibashevsky District, Bashkortostan, Russia. The population was 153 as of 2010. There are 2 streets.

== Geography ==
Maxyutovo is located 4 km northeast of Sterlibashevo (the district's administrative centre) by road. Pervomaysky is the nearest rural locality.
