= Bulyak, Sterlibashevsky District, Republic of Bashkortostan =

Bulyak Буляк
- Village
- Location within Bashkortostan Location within Russia
- Coordinates: 53°20′N 55°34′E
- Country: Russia
- Region: Bashkortostan
- District: Sterlibashevsky District
- Time zone: UTC+5:00

Bulyak (Russian: Буляк; Bashkir: Бүләк, Büläk) is a rural locality (a village) in Saraysinsky Selsoviet, Sterlibashevsky District, Bashkortostan, Russia. The population was 33 as of 2010. There is 1 street.

== Geography ==
Bulyak is located 38 km southeast of Sterlibashevo (the district's administrative centre) by road. Saraysino is the nearest rural locality.
