= Stary Kalkash =

Stary Kalkash Старый Калкаш
- Village
- Location within Bashkortostan Location within Russia
- Coordinates: 53°29′N 55°23′E
- Country: Russia
- Region: Bashkortostan
- District: Sterlibashevsky District
- Time zone: UTC+5:00

Stary Kalkash (Russian: Старый Калкаш; Bashkir: Иҫке Ҡалҡаш, İśke Qalqaş) is a rural locality (a village) and the administrative centre of Starokalkashevsky Selsoviet, Sterlibashevsky District, Bashkortostan, Russia. The population was 349 as of 2010. There are 5 streets.

== Geography ==
Stary Kalkash is located 10 km northeast of Sterlibashevo (the district's administrative centre) by road. Novy Kalkash is the nearest rural locality.
