= Tyater-Araslanovo =

Tyater-Araslanovo Тятер-Арасланово
- Selo
- Location within Bashkortostan Location within Russia
- Coordinates: 53°20′N 54°57′E
- Country: Russia
- Region: Bashkortostan
- District: Sterlibashevsky District
- Time zone: UTC+5:00

Tyater-Araslanovo (Russian: Тятер-Арасланово; Bashkir: Тәтер-Арыҫлан, Täter-Arıślan) is a rural locality (a selo) in Tyater-Araslanovsky Selsoviet, Sterlibashevsky District, Bashkortostan, Russia. The population was 996 as of 2010. There are 9 streets.

== Geography ==
Tyater-Araslanovo is located 27 km southwest of Sterlibashevo (the district's administrative centre) by road. Yasherganovo is the nearest rural locality.
