= Verkhny Gulyum =

Verkhny Gulyum Верхний Гулюм
- Village
- Location within Bashkortostan Location within Russia
- Coordinates: 53°32′N 55°07′E
- Country: Russia
- Region: Bamshkortostan
- District: Sterlibashevsky District
- Time zone: UTC+5:00

Verkhny Gulyum (Russian: Верхний Гулюм; Bashkir: Үрге Гөлөм, Ürge Gölöm) is a rural locality (a village) in Yangurchinsky Selsoviet, Sterlibashevsky District, Bashkortostan, Russia. The population was 218 as of 2010. There are 4 streets.

== Geography ==
Verkhny Gulyum is located 25 km northwest of Sterlibashevo (the district's administrative centre) by road. Verkhotsenko is the nearest rural locality.
