= Bakhcha, Sterlibashevsky District, Republic of Bashkortostan =

Bakhcha Бахча
- Village
- Location within Bashkortostan Location within Russia
- Coordinates: 53°18′N 55°16′E
- Country: Russia
- Region: Bashkortostan
- District: Sterlibashevsky District
- Time zone: UTC+5:00

Bakhcha (Russian: Бахча; Bashkir: Баҡса, Baqsa) is a rural locality (a village) in Karagushsky Selsoviet, Sterlibashevsky District, Bashkortostan, Russia. The population was 92 as of 2010. There are 2 streets.

== Geography ==
Bakhcha is located 16 km south of Sterlibashevo (the district's administrative centre) by road. Karagush is the nearest rural locality.
