= Tabulda =

Tabulda Табулда
- Village
- Location within Bashkortostan Location within Russia
- Coordinates: 53°17′N 55°26′E
- Country: Russia
- Region: Bashkortostan
- District: Sterlibashevsky District
- Time zone: UTC+5:00 (CET)

Tabulda (Russian: Табулда; Bashkir: Табылды, Tabıldı) is a rural locality (a village) in Kundryaksky Selsoviet, Sterlibashevsky District, Bashkortostan, Russia. The population was 306 as of 2010. There are 4 streets.

== Geography ==
Tabulda is located 22 km southeast of Sterlibashevo (the district's administrative centre) by road. Kundryak is the nearest rural locality.
