= Aytugan, Sterlibashevsky District, Republic of Bashkortostan =

Aytugan Айтуган
- Selo
- Location within Bashkortostan Location within Russia
- Coordinates: 53°17′N 54°50′E
- Country: Russia
- Region: Bashkortostan
- District: Sterlibashevsky District

Population (2010)
  - Total: 203
- Time zone: UTC+5:00

Aytugan (Russian: Айтуган; Bashkir: Айтуған, Aytuğan) is a rural locality (a selo) in Yasherganovsky Selsoviet, Sterlibashevsky District, Bashkortostan, Russia. The population was 203 as of 2010. There are 5 streets.

== Geography ==
Aytugan is located 36 km southwest of Sterlibashevo (the district's administrative centre) by road. Nizhneibrayevo is the nearest rural locality.
