= Verkhny Allaguvat =

Verkhny Allaguvat Верхний Аллагуват
- Village
- Location within Bashkortostan Location within Russia
- Coordinates: 53°12′N 55°31′E
- Country: Russia
- Region: Bashkortostan
- District: Sterlibashevsky District
- Time zone: UTC+5:00

Verkhny Allaguvat (Russian: Верхний Аллагуват; Bashkir: Үрге Аллағыуат, Ürge Allağıwat) is a rural locality (a village) in Allaguvatsky Selsoviet, Sterlibashevsky District, Bashkortostan, Russia. The population was 154 as of 2010. There are 3 streets.

== Geography ==
Verkhny Allaguvat is located 38 km southeast of Sterlibashevo (the district's administrative centre) by road. Nizhny Allaguvat is the nearest rural locality.
