= Akchishma =

Akchishma Акчишма
- Village
- Location within Bashkortostan Location within Russia
- Coordinates: 53°20′N 55°10′E
- Country: Russia
- Region: Bashkortostan
- District: Sterlibashevsky District

Population (2010)
  - Total: 41
- Time zone: UTC+5:00

Akchishma (Russian: Акчишма; Bashkir: Аҡшишмә, Aqşişmä) is a rural locality (a village) in Khalikeyevsky Selsoviet, Sterlibashevsky District, Bashkortostan, Russia. The population was 41 as of 2010. There are 3 streets.

== Geography ==
Akchishma is located 16 km southwest of Sterlibashevo (the district's administrative centre) by road. Amirovo is the nearest rural locality.
