= Aydarali =

Aydarali Айдарали
- Selo
- Location within Bashkortostan Location within Russia
- Coordinates: 53°22′N 55°01′E
- Country: Russia
- Region: Bashkortostan
- District: Sterlibashevsky District
- Time zone: UTC+5:00

Aydarali (Russian: Айдарали; Bashkir: Айҙарәле, Ayźaräle) is a rural locality (a selo) and the administrative centre of Aydaralinsky Selsoviet, Sterlibashevsky District, Bashkortostan, Russia. The population was 711 as of 2010. There are 5 streets.

== Geography ==
Aydarali is located 20 km southwest of Sterlibashevo (the district's administrative centre) by road. Artyukhovka is the nearest rural locality.
