= Nizhneshakarovo =

Nizhneshakarovo Нижнешакарово
- Village
- Location within Bashkortostan Location within Russia
- Coordinates: 53°18′N 55°32′E
- Country: Russia
- Region: Bashkortostan
- District: Sterlibashevsky District

Population (2010)
  - Total: 74
- Time zone: UTC+5:00

Nizhneshakarovo (Russian: Нижнешакарово; Bashkir: Түбәнге Шәкәр, Tübänge Şäkär) is a rural locality (a village) in Saraysinsky Selsoviet, Sterlibashevsky District, Bashkortostan, Russia. The population was 74 as of 2010. There are 2 streets.

== Geography ==
Nizhneshakarovo is located 33 km southeast of Sterlibashevo (the district's administrative centre) by road. Verkhneshakarovo is the nearest rural locality.
