= Worskla Forest =

Forest in Russia

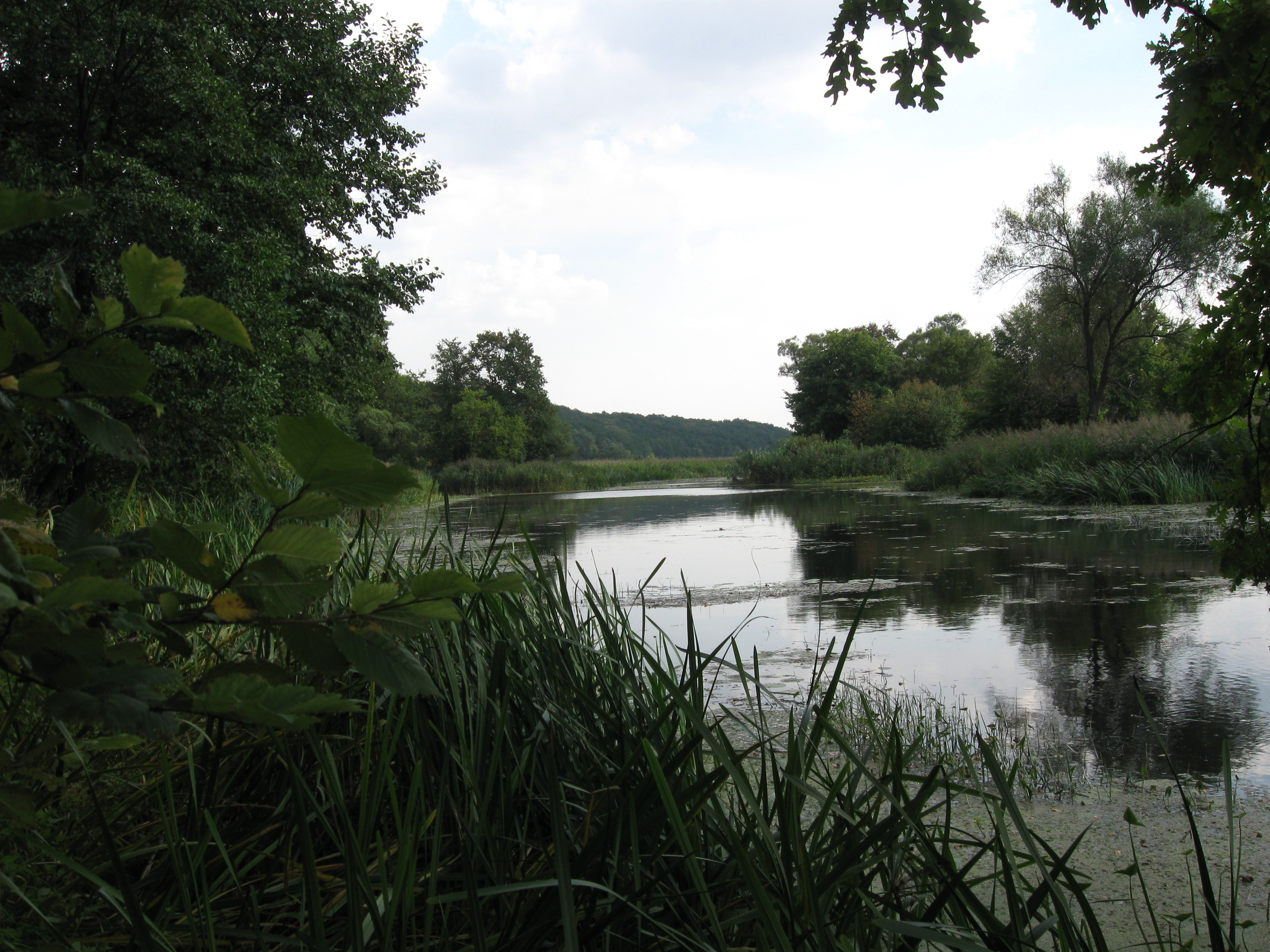
Worskla

The Worskla Forest (на Ворскле) is in the Belgorod Oblast of Russia. It is part of the (Sapowednik) Belogorye Nature Reserve.

It lies on the high right side of the Worskla river, between the Worskla and the Gotnja rivers. It covers an area of 1,038 hectares (2,560 acres). Geographically the area belongs to the southern part of the forest-steppe zone. The nature reserve is bordered to the north-west by the village of Krasny Kutok, to the southeast by Borisovka, and in the north and the south and west by the Worsklatal. On the left bank of the Vorskla, is the village of Dubino (Landsgemeinde Belenkoje). The territory of the forest itself is part of the rural community Kryukovo.

== Geography ==
The western, northwestern and southern edges form the river terraces and slopes of Woskla and Loknjatal Rivers. The highest point in the forest at 217 metres (712 ft) is located in the northeastern part of the forest. The lowest point (137 metres (449 ft)) is located in Worsklatal. Through the forest run numerous small gullies that are called in this region "Jar".

In the forest there are no springs and watercourses although the forest is quite wet at the beginning of spring, after the snow melts, flowing rivulets at the bottom of canyons. The rivers Vorskla, Gotnja and Loknja flow along the forest edge for a distance of 10 to 900 metres (33 to 2,953 ft).

On the territory of the forest there is no natural pond. Only in the protection zone of the nature reserve, in the Worsklatalaue, there are small backwaters. In the 20th century, ponds were built in the Klosterrunse whose dams broke through snow meltwater. Only a pond remained at the top of the gully.

== Soils ==
The soils of the forest at the Vorskla developed on different parent materials, especially on the loam, which is found in the eastern half of the forest. In the northwestern part of the forest, old alluvium sands play a role. They are distributed on the river terraces of Gotnja and Loknja. At the southern and south-eastern edge of the forest an oligozänischer sandy loam is common parent rock. In some places in the southern part of the forest, a rust-colored clay comes out. The oligozänische sandy loam and the rust-colored clay are the starting materials of soil formation, where erosion has removed the loess. Under the oligozänischen clay are rocks from the Cretaceous, which do not appear on the surface in the territory of the forest.

Here 20 different soil types are distinguished. They differ on the degree of podsolisation and the humus content. All floors of the Forest on the Vorskla are based on the Russian soil classification from 1977 about the types of gray forest soils. According to the USDA soil classification they belong to the Alfi sols, after the German soil classification if they were classified as Luvisols.

== History ==
Until the 17th century, the Worskla forest was a part of an undivided oak forest that stretched along the high right bank of the Vorskla River. Forest was used as a natural barrier against depredations of the Tartars. Therefore, logging of the woods was strictly forbidden. At the end of the 17th century, however, the Tartar threat had diminished.

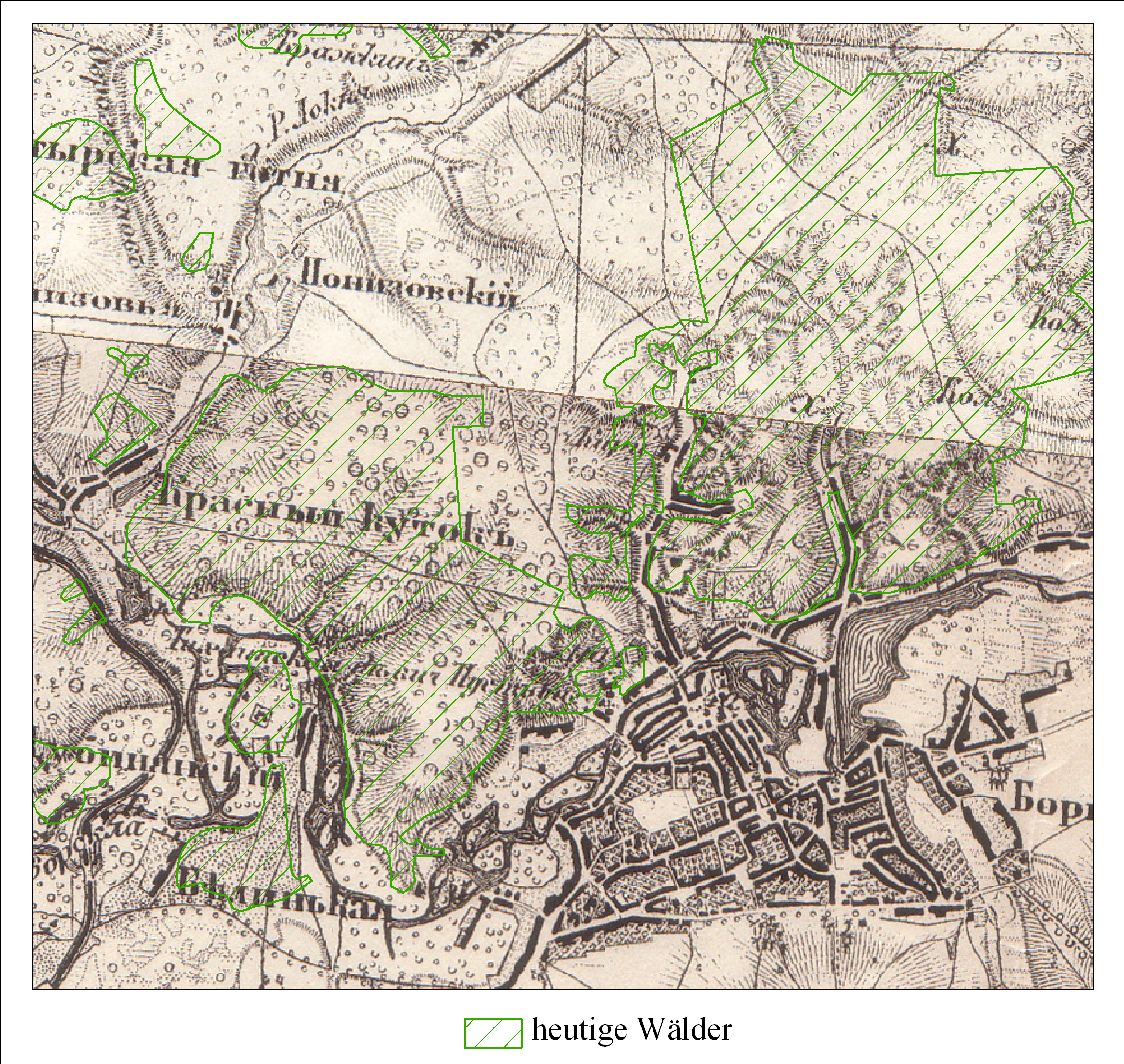
Forest in the 18–19th century

In the Early 18th century the forest was protected from being cut down by regulations of Peter I. In 1701, the deforestation along the rivers was banned, then in 1703, the ban was extended to the small rivers. The edict included a ban on grazing and oaks, pines, maples and elms with trunk thicknesses of more than 54 centimetres (21 in) were excluded from felling.

In 1705 the forest was owned by Count Boris Sheremetev who created a conservation area and hunting reserve. In 1714 Count Sheremetev founded a nunnery in Borisovka on the edge of the forest, today it is a nature reserve.

In the 1880s and 1890s the first major deforestation in the fourth section of the forest and in the northern part of the tenth section the deforestation continued into the 20th century.

After the October Revolution, the forest on the Vorskla was in danger with felling beginning in 1917, with grazing and vegetable gardens being introduced. Larger native animals almost disappeared.

It fell to the entomologist Malyshev to begin a movement to save the forest. He knew the forest at the Vorskla from the time before the revolution when as a student he undertook entomological research there. In 1919 he wrote appeals to various authorities. He also appeared in the People's Assembly of the residents of Borisovka and made propaganda work for forest conservation in schools and village libraries. His efforts were successful, and after the establishment of Zoopsychologischen Station (in 1922) the forest was made a nature reserve in 1924. Malyshev organized the protection of forests. In the nature reserve began scientific research, the nature reserve, the Natural History Museum was founded. In Russian and Germany scientific journals first article on the forest at the Vorskla were published. However, Malyshev was subject to a political witch-hunt under Joseph Stalin and he was dismissed from his role at the Nature Reserve and in 1934, Malyshev was transported to Leningrad.

In 1934 the forest was transferred to control of Leningrad University. During World War II, the forest fell under German occupation who felled tens of thousands of trees. During the Battle of Kursk, trenches were laid out in the forest, causing soil erosion, which can be seen to this day.

In 1994, the Nature Reserve of the University of St. Petersburg was handed over to the Ministry of Natural Resources. Today an area of 160 hectares (400 acres), is the only forest with 300-year-old oak trees to have survived in the European part of the former Soviet Union.

== Gallery ==
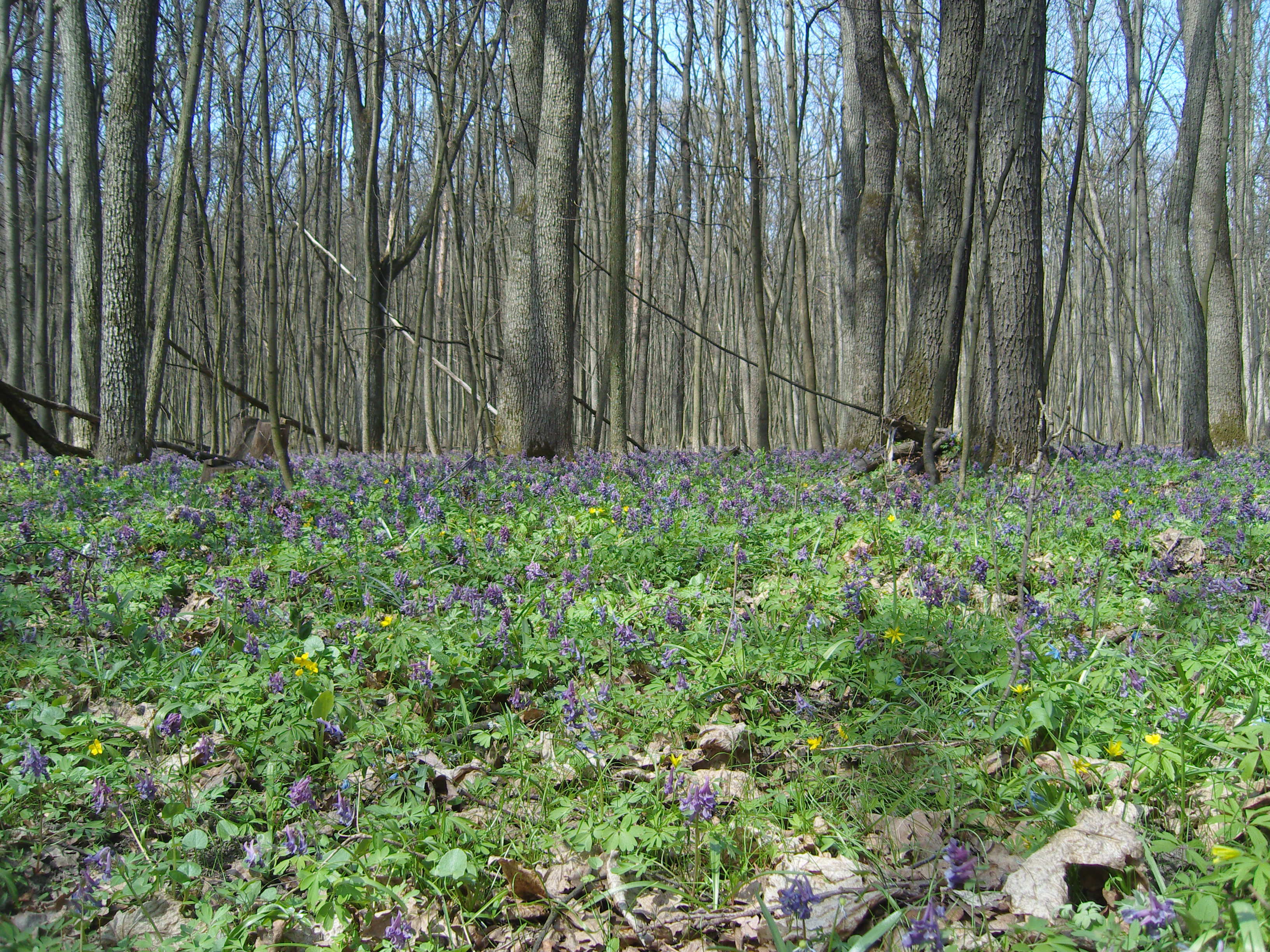
Oaks In Worskla Forest

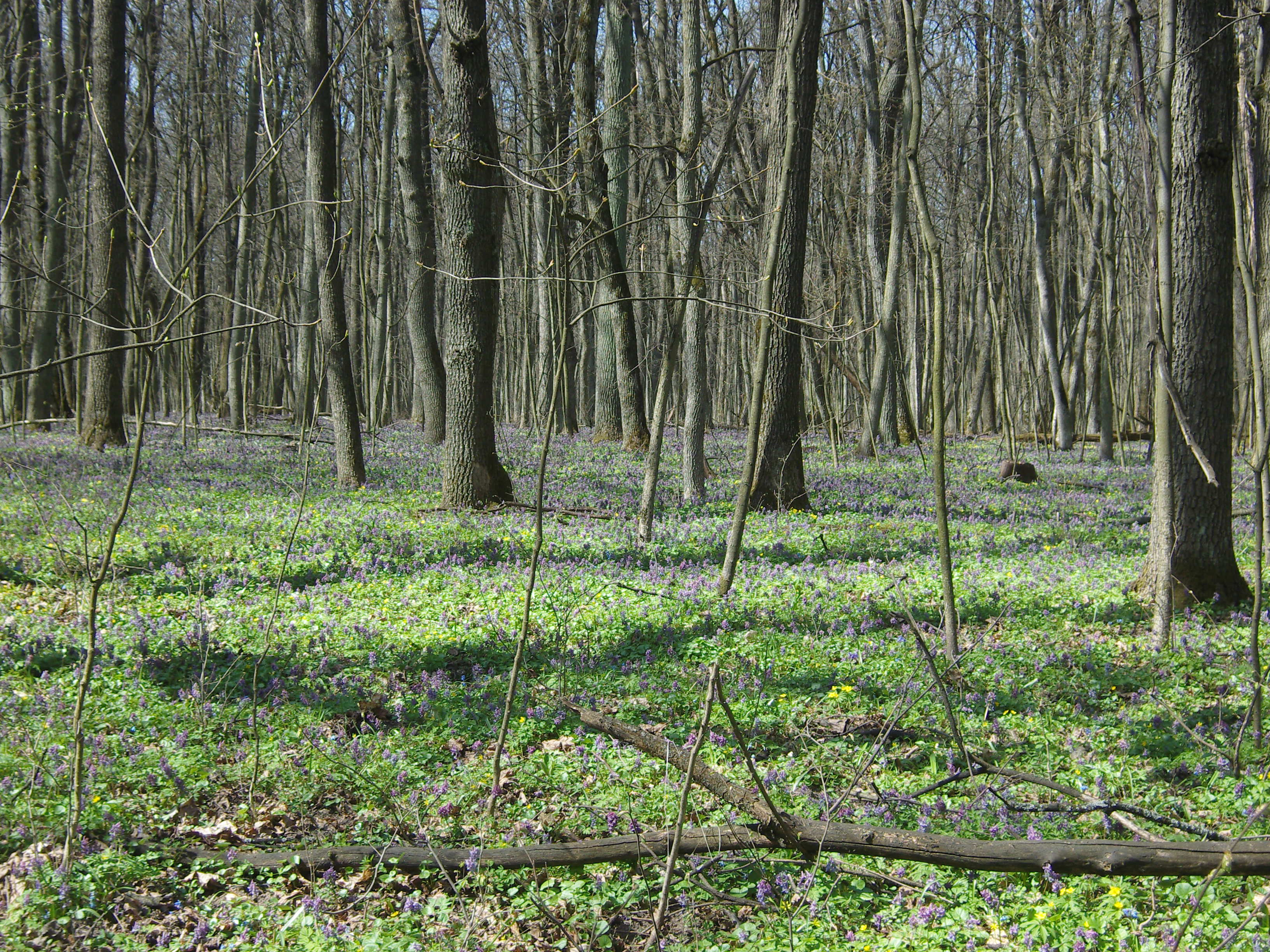
Worska Forest

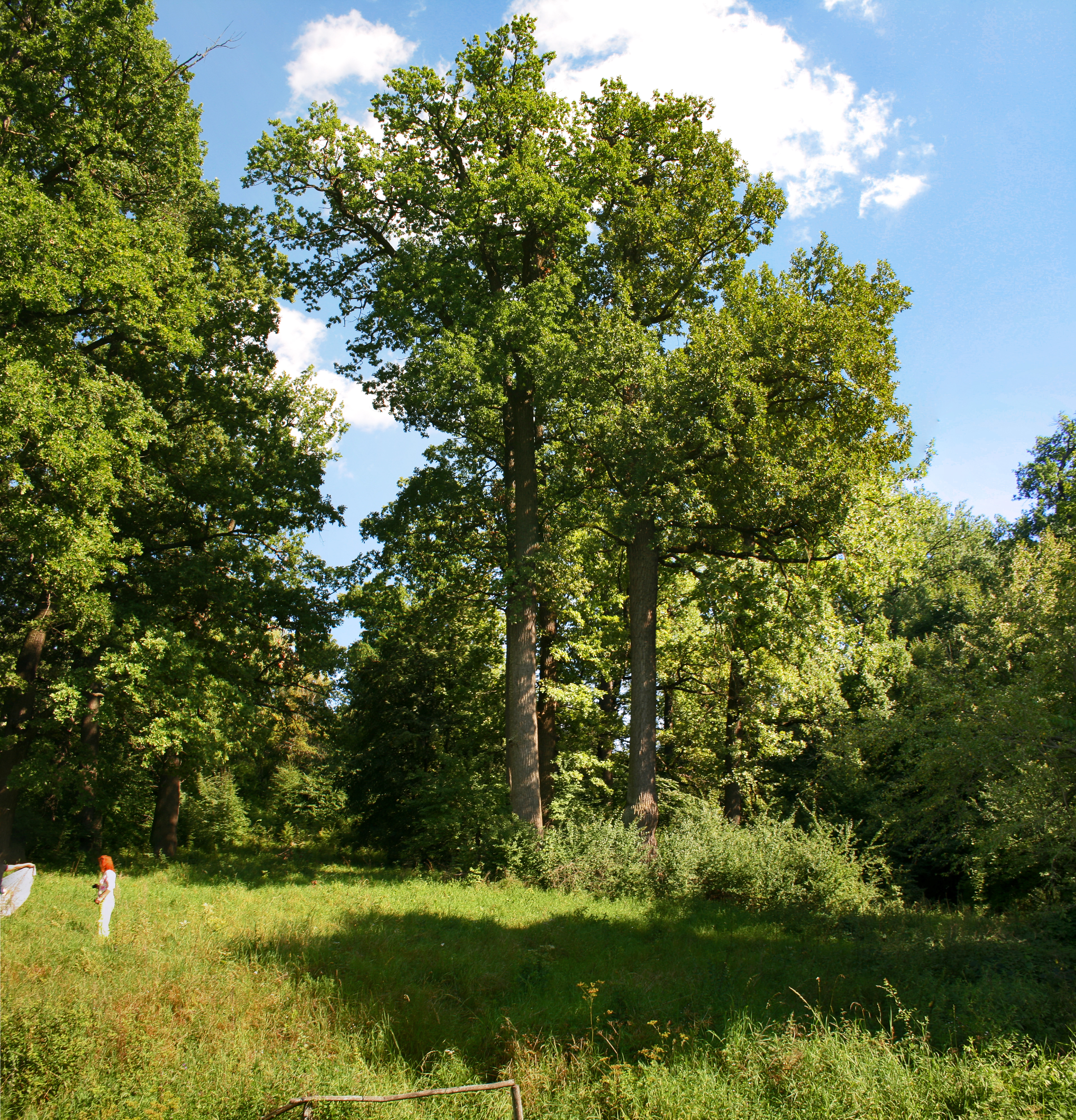
Worska Forest (Summer)

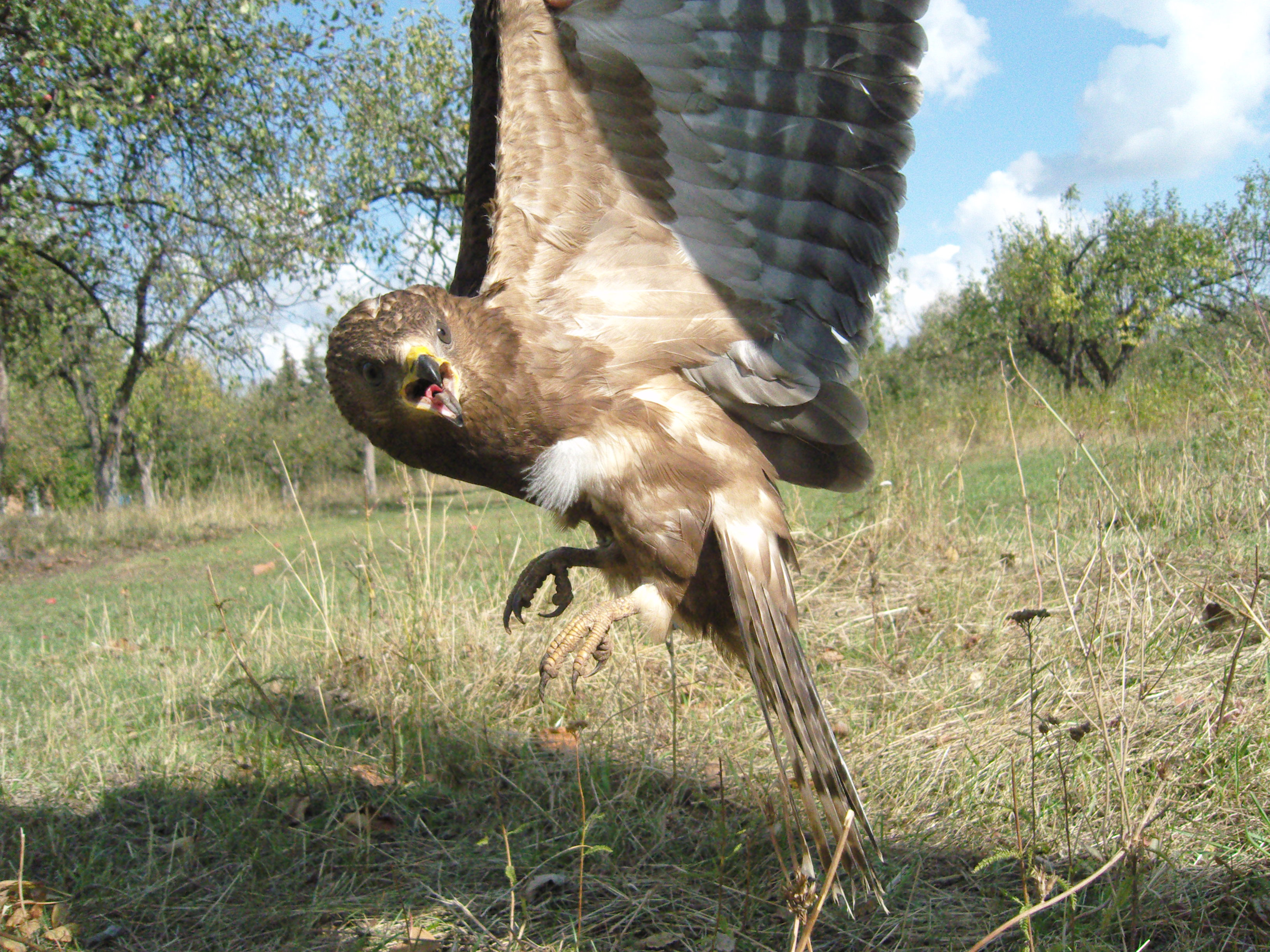
Fauna in the Reserve

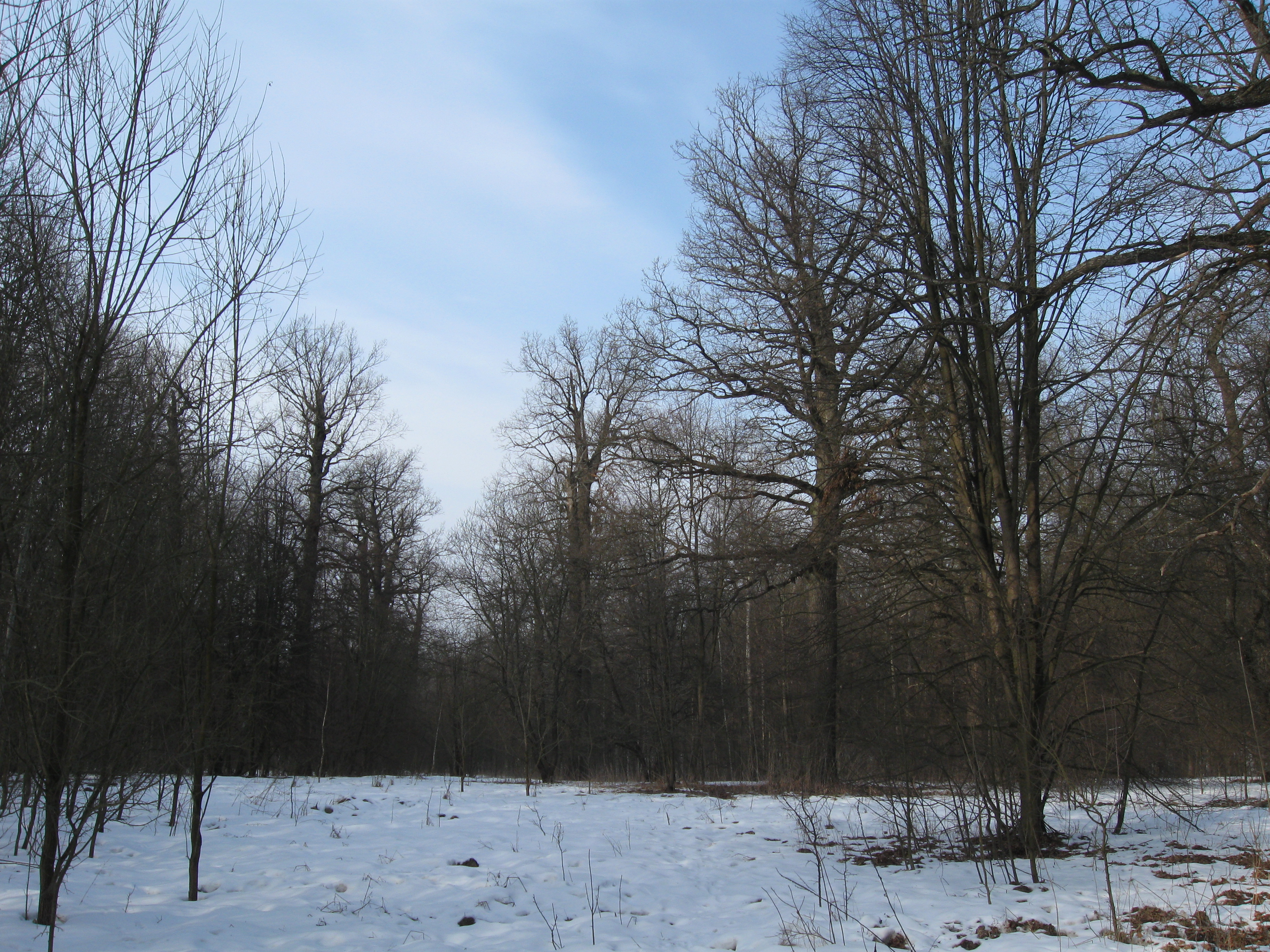
forest in Winter

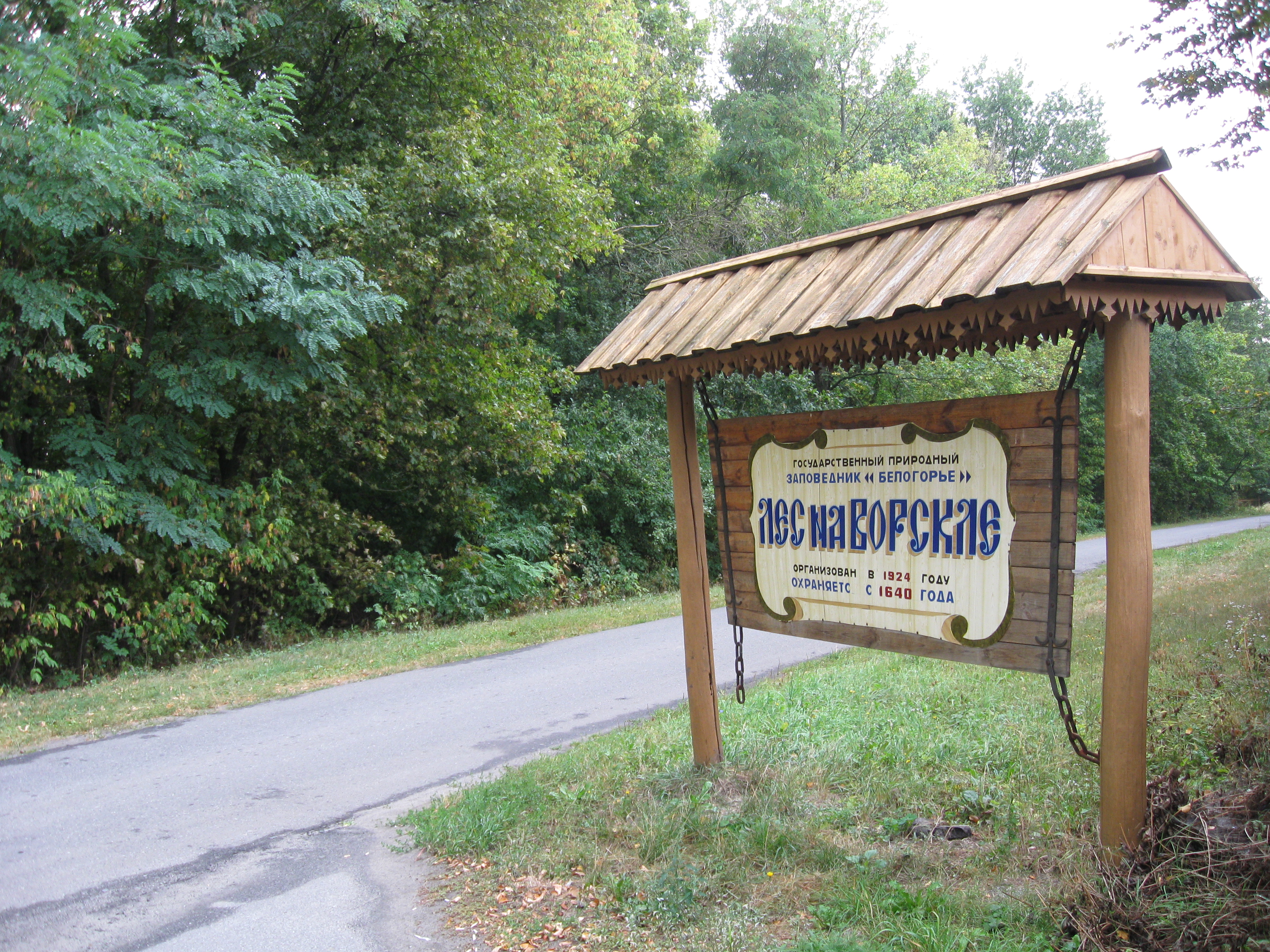
park entry

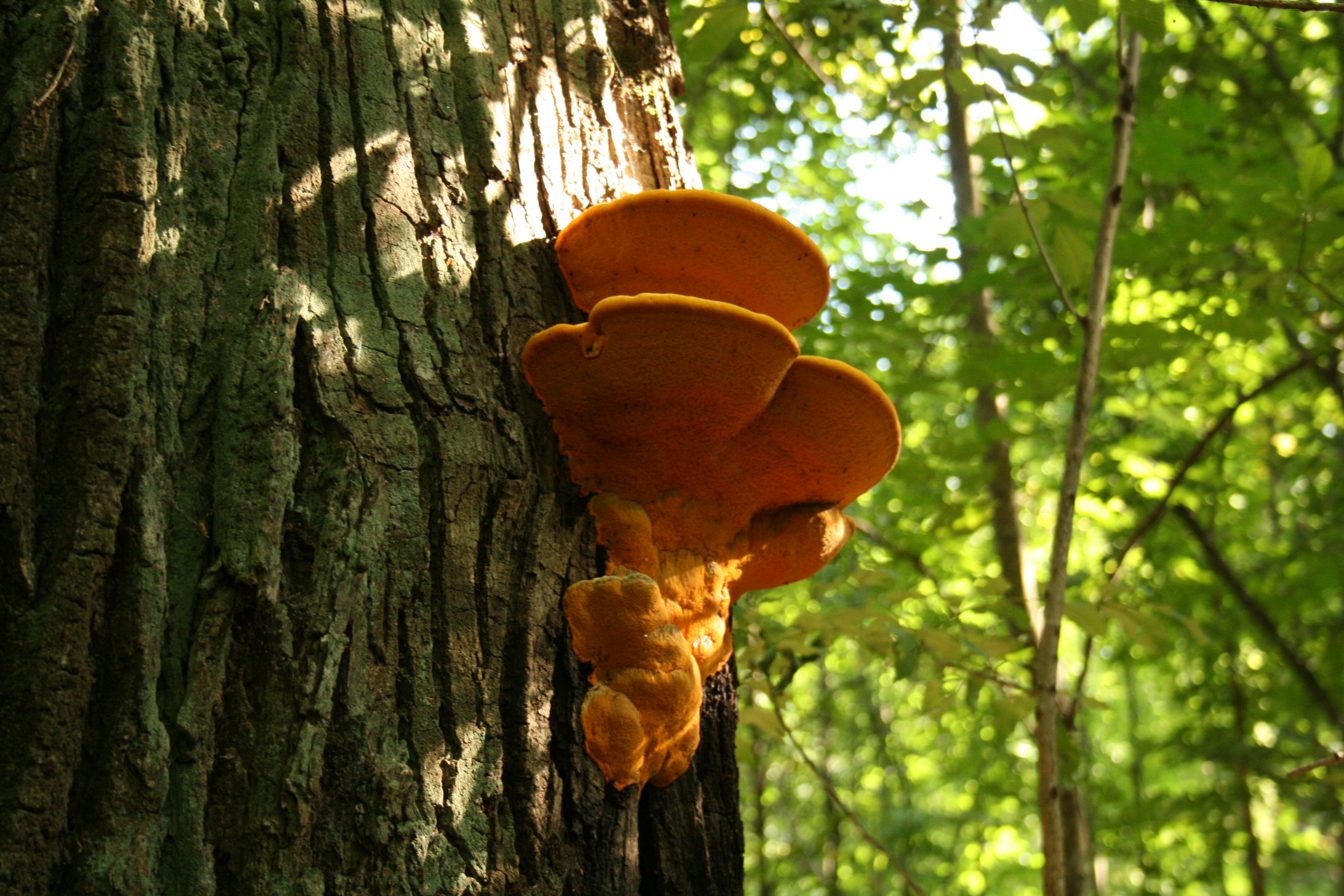
Fungi in the park

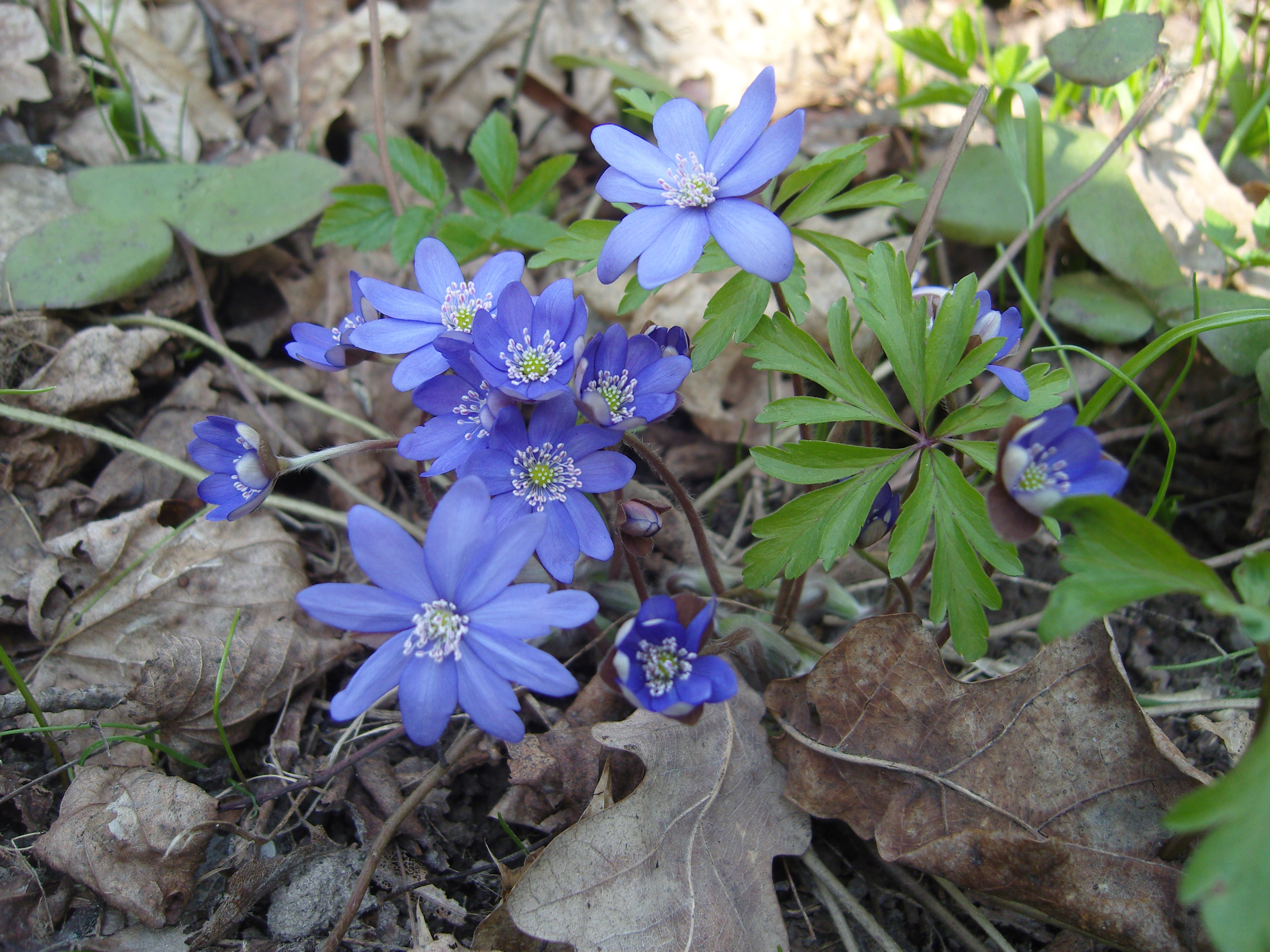
Wild flowers in the reserve

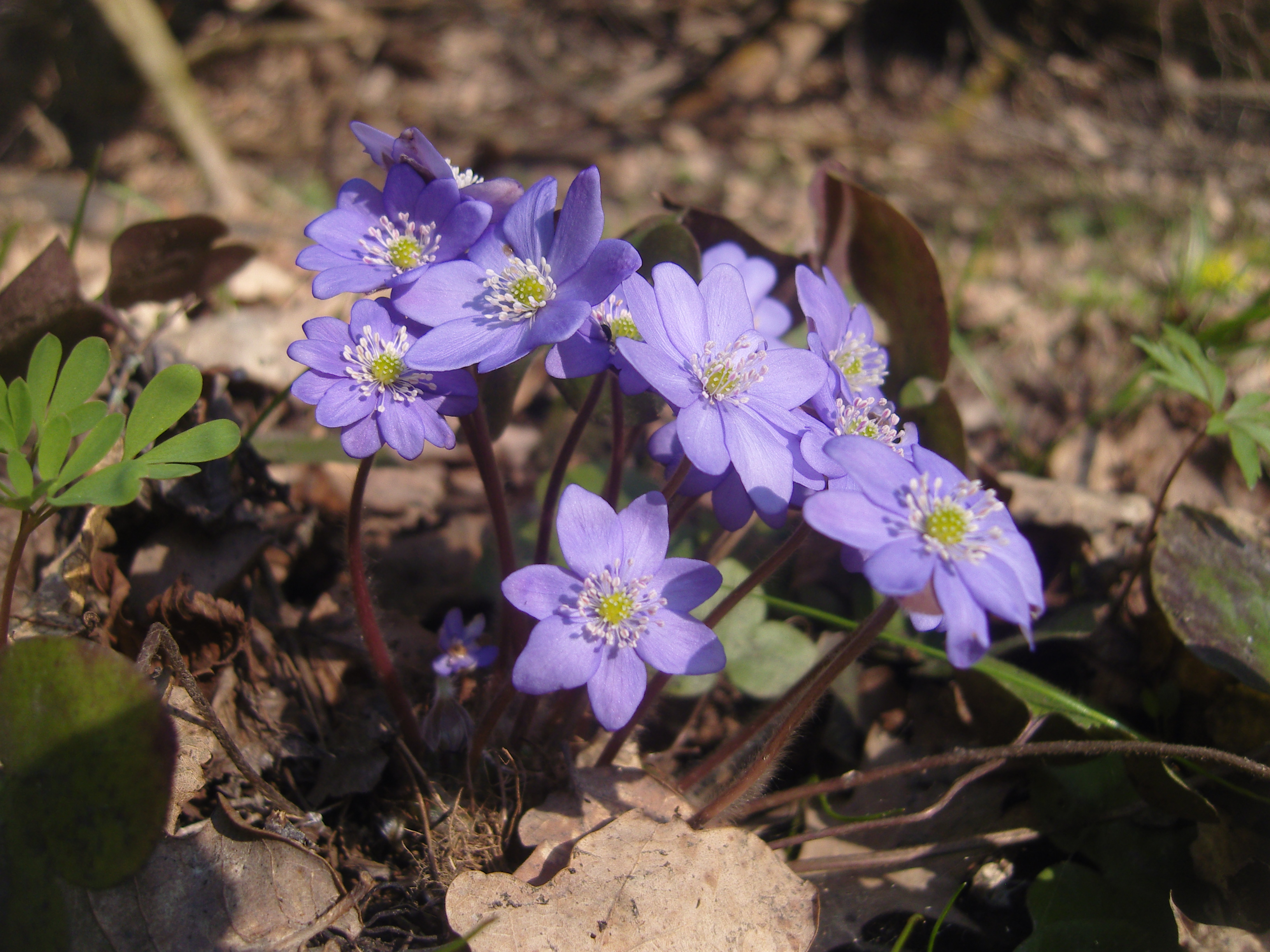
Wild flowers in the reserve
