= Kyzyl-Yar, Sterlibashevsky District, Republic of Bashkortostan =

Kyzyl-Yar Кызыл-Яр
- Village
- Location within Bashkortostan Location within Russia
- Coordinates: 53°19′N 54°45′E
- Country: Russia
- Region: Bashkortostan
- District: Sterlibashevsky District
- Time zone: UTC+5:00

Kyzyl-Yar (Russian: Кызыл-Яр; Bashkir: Ҡыҙылъяр, Qıźılyar) is a rural locality (a village) in Yasherganovsky Selsoviet, Sterlibashevsky District, Bashkortostan, Russia. The population was 71 as of 2010. There is 1 street.

== Geography ==
Kyzyl-Yar is located 41 km southwest of Sterlibashevo (the district's administrative centre) by road. Maly Buzat is the nearest rural locality.
