= Chegodayevka =

Chegodayevka Чегодаевка
- Village
- Location within Bashkortostan Location within Russia
- Coordinates: 53°27′N 55°29′E
- Country: Russia
- Region: Bashkortostan
- District: Sterlibashevsky District
- Time zone: UTC+5:00

Chegodayevka (Russian: Чегодаевка) is a rural locality (a village) in Starokalkashevsky Selsoviet, Sterlibashevsky District, Bashkortostan, Russia. The population was 60 as of 2010. There is 1 street.

== Geography ==
Chegodayevka is located 18 km east of Sterlibashevo (the district's administrative centre) by road. Korneyevka is the nearest rural locality.
