= Maly Buzat =

Maly Buzat Малый Бузат
- Village
- Location within Bashkortostan Location within Russia
- Coordinates: 53°19′N 54°43′E
- Country: Russia
- Region: Bashkortostan
- District: Sterlibashevsky District
- Time zone: UTC+5:00

Maly Buzat (Russian: Малый Бузат; Bashkir: Кесе Буҙат, Kese Buźat) is a rural locality (a village) in Buzatovsky Selsoviet, Sterlibashevsky District, Bashkortostan, Russia. The population was 50 as of 2010. There are 2 streets.

== Geography ==
Maly Buzat is located 44 km southwest of Sterlibashevo (the district's administrative centre) by road. Kyzyl-Yar is the nearest rural locality.
