= Rayevka, Sterlibashevsky District, Republic of Bashkortostan =

Rayevka Раевка
- Village
- Location within Bashkortostan Location within Russia
- Coordinates: 53°15′N 55°25′E
- Country: Russia
- Region: Bashkortostan
- District: Sterlibashevsky District
- Time zone: UTC+5:00

Rayevka (Russian: Раевка) is a rural locality (a village) in Sterlibashevsky District, Bashkortostan, Russia. The population was 53 as of 2010. There is 1 street.

== Geography ==
Rayevka is located 28 km southeast of Sterlibashevo (the district's administrative centre) by road. Kundryak is the nearest rural locality.
