= Uchugan-Asanovo =

Uchugan-Asanovo Учуган-Асаново
- Village
- Location within Bashkortostan Location within Russia
- Coordinates: 53°18′N 54°36′E
- Country: Russia
- Region: Bashkortostan
- District: Sterlibashevsky District
- Time zone: UTC+5:00

Uchugan-Asanovo (Russian: Учуган-Асаново; Bashkir: Өсөгән-Әсән, Ösögän-Äsän) is a rural locality (a village) in Buzatovsky Selsoviet, Sterlibashevsky District, Bashkortostan, Russia. The population was 264 as of 2010. There are 2 streets.

== Geography ==
Uchugan-Asanovo is located 51 km southwest of Sterlibashevo (the district's administrative centre) by road. Buzat is the nearest rural locality.
