= Turmayevo =

Turmayevo Турмаево
- Selo
- Location within Bashkortostan Location within Russia
- Coordinates: 53°31′N 55°12′E
- Country: Russia
- Region: Bashkortostan
- District: Sterlibashevsky District
- Time zone: UTC+5:00

Turmayevo (Russian: Турмаево; Bashkir: Тормай, Tormay) is a rural locality (a selo) in Yangurchinsky Selsoviet, Sterlibashevsky District, Bashkortostan, Russia. The population was 378 as of 2010. There are 4 streets.

== Geography ==
Turmayevo is located 16 km northwest of Sterlibashevo (the district's administrative centre) by road. Bankovka is the nearest rural locality.
