= Novy Kalkash =

Novy Kalkash Новый Калкаш
- Village
- Location within Bashkortostan Location within Russia
- Coordinates: 53°28′N 55°26′E
- Country: Russia
- Region: Bashkortostan
- District: Sterlibashevsky District
- Time zone: UTC+5:00

Novy Kalkash (Russian: Новый Калкаш; Bashkir: Яңы Ҡалҡаш, Yañı Qalqaş) is a rural locality (a village) in Starokalkashevsky Selsoviet, Sterlibashevsky District, Bashkortostan, Russia. The population was 226 as of 2010. There are 5 streets.

== Geography ==
Novy Kalkash is located 14 km northeast of Sterlibashevo (the district's administrative centre) by road. Stary Kalkash is the nearest rural locality.
