= Nizhneibrayevo =

Nizhneibrayevo Нижнеибраево
- Village
- Location within Bashkortostan Location within Russia
- Coordinates: 53°17′N 54°49′E
- Country: Russia
- Region: Bashkortostan
- District: Sterlibashevsky District
- Time zone: UTC+5:00

Nizhneibrayevo (Russian: Нижнеибраево; Bashkir: Түбәнге Ибрай, Tübänge İbray) is a rural locality (a village) in Yasherganovsky Selsoviet, Sterlibashevsky District, Bashkortostan, Russia. The population was 287 as of 2010. There are 5 streets.

== Geography ==
Nizhneibrayevo is located 37 km southwest of Sterlibashevo (the district's administrative centre) by road. Aytugan is the nearest rural locality.
