= Starolyubino =

Starolyubino Старолюбино
- Village
- Location within Bashkortostan Location within Russia
- Coordinates: 53°14′N 54°43′E
- Country: Russia
- Region: Bashkortostan
- District: Sterlibashevsky District
- Time zone: UTC+5:00

Starolyubino (Russian: Старолюбино) is a rural locality (a village) in Buzatovsky Selsoviet, Sterlibashevsky District, Bashkortostan, Russia. The population was 14 as of 2010. There is 1 street.

== Geography ==
Starolyubino is located 55 km southwest of Sterlibashevo (the district's administrative centre) by road. Galey-Buzat is the nearest rural locality.
