= Verkhneshakarovo =

Verkhneshakarovo Верхнешакарово
- Village
- Location within Bashkortostan Location within Russia
- Coordinates: 53°17′N 55°30′E
- Country: Russia
- Region: Bashkortostan
- District: Sterlibashevsky District
- Time zone: UTC+5:00

Verkhneshakarovo (Russian: Верхнешакарово; Bashkir: Үрге Шәкәр, Ürge Şäkär) is a rural locality (a village) in Saraysinsky Selsoviet, Sterlibashevsky District, Bashkortostan, Russia. The population was 168 as of 2010. There is 1 street.

== Geography ==
Verkhneshakarovo is located 33 km southeast of Sterlibashevo (the district's administrative centre) by road. Nizhneshakarovo is the nearest rural locality.
