= Saraysino =

Saraysino Сарайсино
- Village
- Location within Bashkortostan Location within Russia
- Coordinates: 53°21′N 55°35′E
- Country: Russia
- Region: Bashkortostan
- District: Sterlibashevsky District
- Time zone: UTC+5:00

Saraysino (Russian: Сарайсино; Bashkir: Һарайҫа, Harayśa) is a rural locality (a village) in Saraysinsky Selsoviet, Sterlibashevsky District, Bashkortostan, Russia. The population was 283 as of 2010. There are 7 streets.

== Geography ==
Saraysino is located 43 km southeast of Sterlibashevo (the district's administrative centre) by road. Bulyak is the nearest rural locality.
