= Nizhniye Karamaly =

Nizhniye Karamaly Нижние Карамалы
- Village
- Location within Bashkortostan Location within Russia
- Coordinates: 53°21′N 55°28′E
- Country: Russia
- Region: Bashkortostan
- District: Sterlibashevsky District

Population (2010)
  - Total: 29
- Time zone: UTC+5:00

Nizhniye Karamaly (Russian: Нижние Карамалы; Bashkir: Түбәнге Ҡарамалы, Tübänge Qaramalı) is a rural locality (a village) in Bakeyevsky Selsoviet, Sterlibashevsky District, Bashkortostan, Russia. The population was 29 as of 2010. There is 1 street.

== Geography ==
Nizhniye Karamaly is located 23 km southeast of Sterlibashevo (the district's administrative centre) by road. Novonikolayevka is the nearest rural locality.
