= Amirovo, Sterlibashevsky District, Republic of Bashkortostan =

Amirovo Амирово
- Selo
- Location within Bashkortostan Location within Russia
- Coordinates: 53°20′N 55°12′E
- Country: Russia
- Region: Bashkortostan
- District: Sterlibashevsky District

Population (2010)
  - Total: 483
- Time zone: UTC+5:00

Amirovo (Russian: Амирово; Bashkir: Әмир, Ämir) is a rural locality (a selo) in Khalikeyevsky Selsoviet, Sterlibashevsky District, Bashkortostan, Russia. The population was 483 as of 2010. There are 4 streets.

== Geography ==
Amirovo is located 13 km south of Sterlibashevo (the district's administrative centre) by road. Akchishma is the nearest rural locality.
