= Novoivanovka, Sterlibashevsky District, Republic of Bashkortostan =

Novoivanovka Новоивановка
- Village
- Location within Bashkortostan Location within Russia
- Coordinates: 53°32′N 55°21′E
- Country: Russia
- Region: Bashkortostan
- District: Sterlibashevsky District
- Time zone: UTC+5:00

Novoivanovka (Russian: Новоивановка) is a rural locality (a village) in Kuganakbashevsky Selsoviet, Sterlibashevsky District, Bashkortostan, Russia. The population was 6 as of 2010. There is 1 street.

== Geography ==
Novoivanovka is located 17 km northeast of Sterlibashevo (the district's administrative centre) by road. Yumaguzino is the nearest rural locality.
