= Yangurcha =

Yangurcha Янгурча
- Selo
- Location within Bashkortostan Location within Russia
- Coordinates: 53°33′N 55°10′E
- Country: Russia
- Region: Bashkortostan
- District: Sterlibashevsky District
- Time zone: UTC+5:00

Yangurcha (Russian: Янгурча; Bashkir: Ямғырсы, Yamğırsı) is a rural locality (a selo) and the administrative centre of Yangurchinsky Selsoviet, Sterlibashevsky District, Bashkortostan, Russia. The population was 388 as of 2010. There are 4 streets.

== Geography ==
Yangurcha is located 22 km northwest of Sterlibashevo (the district's administrative centre) by road. Verkhny Gulyum is the nearest rural locality.
