= Karanayevo, Sterlibashevsky District, Republic of Bashkortostan =

Karanayevo Каранаево
- Village
- Location within Bashkortostan Location within Russia
- Coordinates: 53°35′N 55°13′E
- Country: Russia
- Region: Bashkortostan
- District: Sterlibashevsky District
- Time zone: UTC+5:00

Karanayevo (Russian: Каранаево; Bashkir: Ҡаранай, Qaranay) is a rural locality (a village) in Yangurchinsky Selsoviet, Sterlibashevsky District, Bashkortostan, Russia. The population was 82 as of 2010. There are 3 streets.

== Geography ==
Karanayevo is located 26 km north of Sterlibashevo (the district's administrative centre) by road. Yangurcha is the nearest rural locality.
