= Yelimbetovo, Sterlibashevsky District, Republic of Bashkortostan =

Yelimbetovo Елимбетово
- Selo
- Location within Bashkortostan Location within Russia
- Coordinates: 53°21′N 55°38′E
- Country: Russia
- Region: Bashkortostan
- District: Sterlibashevsky District
- Time zone: UTC+5:00

Yelimbetovo (Russian: Елимбетово; Bashkir: Йәлембәт, Yälembät) is a rural locality (a selo) and the administrative centre of Saraysinsky Selsoviet, Sterlibashevsky District, Bashkortostan, Russia. The population was 373 as of 2010. There are 7 streets.

== Geography ==
Yelimbetovo is located 41 km southeast of Sterlibashevo (the district's administrative centre) by road. Umetbayevo is the nearest rural locality.
