= Khalikeyevo =

Khalikeyevo Халикеево
- Selo
- Location within Bashkortostan Location within Russia
- Coordinates: 53°22′N 55°14′E
- Country: Russia
- Region: Bashkortostan
- District: Sterlibashevsky District
- Time zone: UTC+5:00

Khalikeyevo (Russian: Халикеево; Bashkir: Хәлекәй, Xälekäy) is a rural locality (a selo) and the administrative centre of Khalikeyevsky Selsoviet, Sterlibashevsky District, Bashkortostan, Russia. The population was 350 as of 2010. There are 7 streets.

== Geography ==
Khalikeyevo is located 8 km south of Sterlibashevo (the district's administrative centre) by road. Sary-Yelga is the nearest rural locality.
