= Ibrakayevo =

Ibrakayevo Ибракаево
- Village
- Location within Bashkortostan Location within Russia
- Coordinates: 53°28′N 55°21′E
- Country: Russia
- Region: Bashkortostan
- District: Sterlibashevsky District
- Time zone: UTC+5:00

Ibrakayevo (Russian: Ибракаево; Bashkir: Ибраҡай, İbraqay) is a rural locality (a village) in Sterlibashevsky Selsoviet, Sterlibashevsky District, Bashkortostan, Russia. The population was 404 as of 2010. There are 5 streets.

== Geography ==
Ibrakayevo is located 7 km northeast of Sterlibashevo (the district's administrative centre) by road. Stary Kalkash is the nearest rural locality.
