= Karayar, Sterlibashevsky District, Republic of Bashkortostan =

Karayar Караяр
- Village
- Location within Bashkortostan Location within Russia
- Coordinates: 53°16′N 55°30′E
- Country: Russia
- Region: Bashkortostan
- District: Sterlibashevsky District
- Time zone: UTC+5:00

Karayar (Russian: Караяр; Bashkir: Ҡараяр, Qarayar) is a rural locality (a village) in Allaguvatsky Selsoviet, Sterlibashevsky District, Bashkortostan, Russia. The population was 64 as of 2010. There are 2 streets.

== Geography ==
Karayar is located 28 km southeast of Sterlibashevo (the district's administrative centre) by road. Oktyabrevka is the nearest rural locality.
