= Kordon Lesnoy =

Kordon Lesnoy Кордон Лесной
- Village
- Location within Bashkortostan Location within Russia
- Coordinates: 53°27′N 55°13′E
- Country: Russia
- Region: Bashkortostan
- District: Sterlibashevsky District
- Time zone: UTC+5:00

Kordon Lesnoy (Russian: Кордон Лесной) is a rural locality (a village) in Sterlibashevsky Selsoviet, Sterlibashevsky District, Bashkortostan, Russia. The population was 32 as of 2010. There are 2 streets.

== Geography ==
Kordon Lesnoy is located 4 km northwest of Sterlibashevo (the district's administrative centre) by road. Sterlibashevo is the nearest rural locality.
