= Kundryak =

Kundryak Кундряк
- Selo
- Location within Bashkortostan Location within Russia
- Coordinates: 53°15′N 55°26′E
- Country: Russia
- Region: Bashkortostan
- District: Sterlibashevsky District
- Time zone: UTC+5:00

Kundryak (Russian: Кундряк; Bashkir: Күндерәк, Künderäk) is a rural locality (a selo) and the administrative centre of Kundryaksky Selsoviet, Sterlibashevsky District, Bashkortostan, Russia. The population was 321 as of 2010. There are 5 streets.

== Geography ==
Kundryak is located 25 km southeast of Sterlibashevo (the district's administrative centre) by road. Rayevka is the nearest rural locality.
