= Karagush =

Karagush Карагуш
- Selo
- Location within Bashkortostan Location within Russia
- Coordinates: 53°17′N 55°16′E
- Country: Russia
- Region: Bashkortostan
- District: Sterlibashevsky District
- Time zone: UTC+5:00

Karagush (Russian: Карагуш; Bashkir: Ҡарағош, Qarağoş) is a rural locality (a selo) and the administrative centre of Karagushsky Selsoviet, Sterlibashevsky District, Bashkortostan, Russia. The population was 567 as of 2010. There are 472 streets.

== Geography ==
Karagush is located 20 km south of Sterlibashevo (the district's administrative centre) by road. Bakhcha is the nearest rural locality.
