= Bankovka =

Bankovka Банковка
- Village
- Location within Bashkortostan Location within Russia
- Coordinates: 53°32′N 55°13′E
- Country: Russia
- Region: Bashkortostan
- District: Sterlibashevsky District
- Time zone: UTC+5:00

Bankovka (Russian: Банковка) is a rural locality (a village) in Yangurchinsky Selsoviet, Sterlibashevsky District, Bashkortostan, Russia. The population was 26 as of 2010. There is 1 street.

== Geography ==
Bankovka is located 18 km north of Sterlibashevo (the district's administrative centre) by road. Turmayevo is the nearest rural locality.
