= Murtaza, Sterlibashevsky District, Republic of Bashkortostan =

Murtaza Муртаза
- Village
- Location within Bashkortostan Location within Russia
- Coordinates: 53°30′N 55°16′E
- Country: Russia
- Region: Bashkortostan
- District: Sterlibashevsky District
- Time zone: UTC+5:00

Murtaza (Russian: Муртаза; Bashkir: Мортаҙа, Mortaźa) is a rural locality (a village) in Sterlibashevsky Selsoviet, Sterlibashevsky District, Bashkortostan, Russia. The population was 165 as of 2010. There are 7 streets.

== Geography ==
Murtaza is located 10 km north of Sterlibashevo (the district's administrative centre) by road. Nikolskoye is the nearest rural locality.
