= Artyukhovka =

Artyukhovka Артюховка
- Village
- Location within Bashkortostan Location within Russia
- Coordinates: 53°23′N 55°02′E
- Country: Russia
- Region: Bashkortostan
- District: Sterlibashevsky District

Population (2010)
  - Total: 52
- Time zone: UTC+5:00

Artyukhovka (Russian: Артюховка) is a rural locality (a village) in Aydaralinsky Selsoviet, Sterlibashevsky District, Bashkortostan, Russia. The population was 52 as of 2010. There is 1 street.

== Geography ==
Artyukhovka is located 18 km southwest of Sterlibashevo (the district's administrative centre) by road. Aydarali is the nearest rural locality.
