= Bulazh =

Bulazh Булаж
- Village
- Location within Bashkortostan Location within Russia
- Coordinates: 53°24′N 55°10′E
- Country: Russia
- Region: Bashkortostan
- District: Sterlibashevsky District
- Time zone: UTC+5:00

Bulazh (Russian: Булаж; Bashkir: Булаш, Bulaş) is a rural locality (a village) in Sterlibashevsky Selsoviet, Sterlibashevsky District, Bashkortostan, Russia. The population was 62 as of 2010. There are 2 streets.

== Geography ==
Bulazh is located 10 km (6.2 mi) southwest of Sterlibashevo (the district's administrative centre) by road. Mukhametdaminovo is the nearest rural locality.
