= Oktyabrevka =

Oktyabrevka Октябревка
- Village
- Location within Bashkortostan Location within Russia
- Coordinates: 53°16′N 55°30′E
- Country: Russia
- Region: Bashkortostan
- District: Sterlibashevsky District
- Time zone: UTC+5:00

Oktyabrevka (Russian: Октябревка) is a rural locality (a village) in Allaguvatsky Selsoviet, Sterlibashevsky District, Bashkortostan, Russia. The population was 20 as of 2010. There is 1 street.

== Geography ==
Oktyabrevka is located 28 km southeast of Sterlibashevo (the district's administrative centre) by road. Karayar is the nearest rural locality.
