= Baimovo, Sterlibashevsky District, Republic of Bashkortostan =

Baimovo Баимово
- Village
- Location within Bashkortostan Location within Russia
- Coordinates: 53°30′N 55°31′E
- Country: Russia
- Region: Bashkortostan
- District: Sterlibashevsky District

Population (2010)
  - Total: 62
- Time zone: UTC+5:00

Baimovo (Russian: Баимово; Bashkir: Байым, Bayım) is a rural locality (a village) in Starokalkashevsky Selsoviet, Sterlibashevsky District, Bashkortostan, Russia. The population was 62 as of 2010. There is 1 street.

== Geography ==
Baimovo is located 20 km northeast of Sterlibashevo (the district's administrative centre) by road. Pokrovka is the nearest rural locality.
