= Korneyevka, Sterlibashevsky District, Republic of Bashkortostan =

Korneyevka Корнеевка
- Village
- Location within Bashkortostan Location within Russia
- Coordinates: 53°27′N 55°29′E
- Country: Russia
- Region: Bashkortostan
- District: Sterlibashevsky District
- Time zone: UTC+5:00

Korneyevka (Russian: Корнеевка) is a rural locality (a village) in Starokalkashevsky Selsoviet, Sterlibashevsky District, Bashkortostan, Russia. The population was 101 as of 2010. There is 1 street.

== Geography ==
Korneyevka is located 18 km east of Sterlibashevo (the district's administrative centre) by road. Chegodayevka is the nearest rural locality.
