= Krasny Kutok =

Krasny Kutok Красный Куток
- Selo
- Location within Belgorod Oblast Location within Russia
- Coordinates: 50°37′N 35°55′E
- Country: Russia
- Region: Belgorod Oblast
- District: Borisovsky District
- Time zone: UTC+3:00

Krasny Kutok (Russian: Красный Куток) is a rural locality (a selo) and the administrative center of Krasnokutskoye Rural Settlement, Borisovsky District, Belgorod Oblast, Russia. The population was 556 as of 2010. There are 8 streets.

== Geography ==
Krasny Kutok is located 13 km northwest of Borisovka (the district's administrative centre) by road. Vakovshchina is the nearest rural locality.
