= Tri Klyucha =

Tri Klyucha Три Ключа
- Village
- Location within Bashkortostan Location within Russia
- Coordinates: 54°58′N 54°18′E
- Country: Russia
- Region: Bashkortostan
- District: Sharansky District
- Time zone: UTC+5:00

Tri Klyucha (Russian: Три Ключа) is a rural locality (a village) in Michurinsky Selsoviet, Sharansky District, Bashkortostan, Russia. The population was 107 as of 2010. There are 3 streets.

== Geography ==
Tri Klyucha is located 29 km northeast of Sharan (the district's administrative centre) by road. Borisovka is the nearest rural locality.
