= Gumbazy =

Gumbazy Гумбазы
- Village
- Location within Bashkortostan Location within Russia
- Coordinates: 53°25′N 55°18′E
- Country: Russia
- Region: Bashkortostan
- District: Sterlibashevsky District
- Time zone: UTC+5:00

Gumbazy (Russian: Гумбазы; Bashkir: Гөмбаҙы, Gömbaźı) is a rural locality (a village) in Sterlibashevsky Selsoviet, Sterlibashevsky District, Bashkortostan, Russia. The population was 27 as of 2010. There is 1 street.

== Geography ==
Gumbazy is located 4 km southeast of Sterlibashevo (the district's administrative centre) by road. Sterlibashevo is the nearest rural locality.
