= Mukhametdaminovo =

Mukhametdaminovo Мухаметдаминово
- Village
- Location within Bashkortostan Location within Russia
- Coordinates: 53°24′N 55°12′E
- Country: Russia
- Region: Bashkortostan
- District: Sterlibashevsky District
- Time zone: UTC+5:00

Mukhametdaminovo (Russian: Мухаметдаминово; Bashkir: Мөхәмәтдәмин, Möxämätdämin) is a rural locality (a village) in Sterlibashevsky Selsoviet, Sterlibashevsky District, Bashkortostan, Russia. The population was 110 as of 2010. There are 3 streets.

== Geography ==
Mukhametdaminovo is located 6 km southwest of Sterlibashevo (the district's administrative centre) by road. Sterlibashevo is the nearest rural locality.
