= Borisovka, Sterlibashevsky District, Republic of Bashkortostan =

Borisovka Борисовка
- Village
- Location within Bashkortostan Location within Russia
- Coordinates: 53°19′N 55°23′E
- Country: Russia
- Region: Bashkortostan
- District: Sterlibashevsky District
- Time zone: UTC+5:00

Borisovka (Russian: Борисовка) is a rural locality (a village) in Bakeyevsky Selsoviet, Sterlibashevsky District, Bashkortostan, Russia. The population was 35 as of 2010. There is 1 street.

== Geography ==
Borisovka is located 18 km southeast of Sterlibashevo (the district's administrative centre) by road. Novonikolayevka is the nearest rural locality.
