= Tyaterbash =

Tyaterbash Тятербаш Тәтербаш (Tatar)
- Rural locality

Other transcription(s)
  - Chuvash: Тетерпуς
  - Tatar: Тәтербаш
- Interactive map of Tyaterbash
- Location of Tyaterbash Tyaterbash (Bashkortostan)
- Coordinates: 53°29′28″N 55°12′45″E
- Country: Russia
- Federal subject: Bashkortostan
- Administrative district: Sterlibashevsky District

Population
  - Estimate (2010): 331 )
- Time zone: UTC+5 (MSK+2)
- Postal code: 453194
- Dialing code: +7 34739
- OKTMO ID: 80648445111

Tyaterbash (Russian: Тятербаш; Bashkir: Тәтербаш, Täterbaş; Chuvash: Тетерпуς, Teterpuś) is a rural locality in Sterlibashevsky District of the Republic of Bashkortostan, Russia. It belongs to Sterlibashevsky rural soviet. For January 1, 2009, the population was about 413 people. Postal index – 453194, Russian Classification on Objects of Administrative Division code – 80248845009. The previous name of the village is Tyaterbashevo.

== History ==
The population migrated from Chuvashia in about the 17th century and originally settled in Artukhovsky volost of Belebeevsky county of Orenburg province (now it is Sterlibashevsky rajon of the Republic of Bashkortostan), it is about 3-4 kilometers from village Smorodinovka, in the lands of a landowner from Saint Petersburg, not so far from a not existing currently village Baranovka. The Orenburg province in 1865 was divided into two provinces: Ufa and Oregburg. The village Tyater’bash (the name used to be written with soft sign) became a part of the Ufa province Sterlitamak county Artukhovsky volost.

=== Location history ===
==== Fire ====
There was a fire and the whole village burned away. The inhabitants had no wish to construct the new houses at the place of hearth and home, and decided to migrate to another place.

The version is supported by some inhabitants of today's Tyaterbash, which insist that that year the summer was really hot. The majority of the village was on haymaking and could not take part in fighting a fire. When they returned from haymaking there were only dying embers instead of their houses. And, insofar as according to ancient Chuvash belief it is not good to build houses at the place of fire, so, people decided to move to a new place.

Today, there is no documentary proof of the version. Nevertheless, it is the version of the migration of the village to the current location that was told by the great-grandfather and great-grandmother of village inhabitant Mr. A.G. Petrov.
