= Belogorye Nature Reserve =

Nature reserve in Belgorod Oblast, Russia

- Russian: Белогорье заповедник (Also: Belogor'e)
- IUCN category Ia (strict nature reserve)
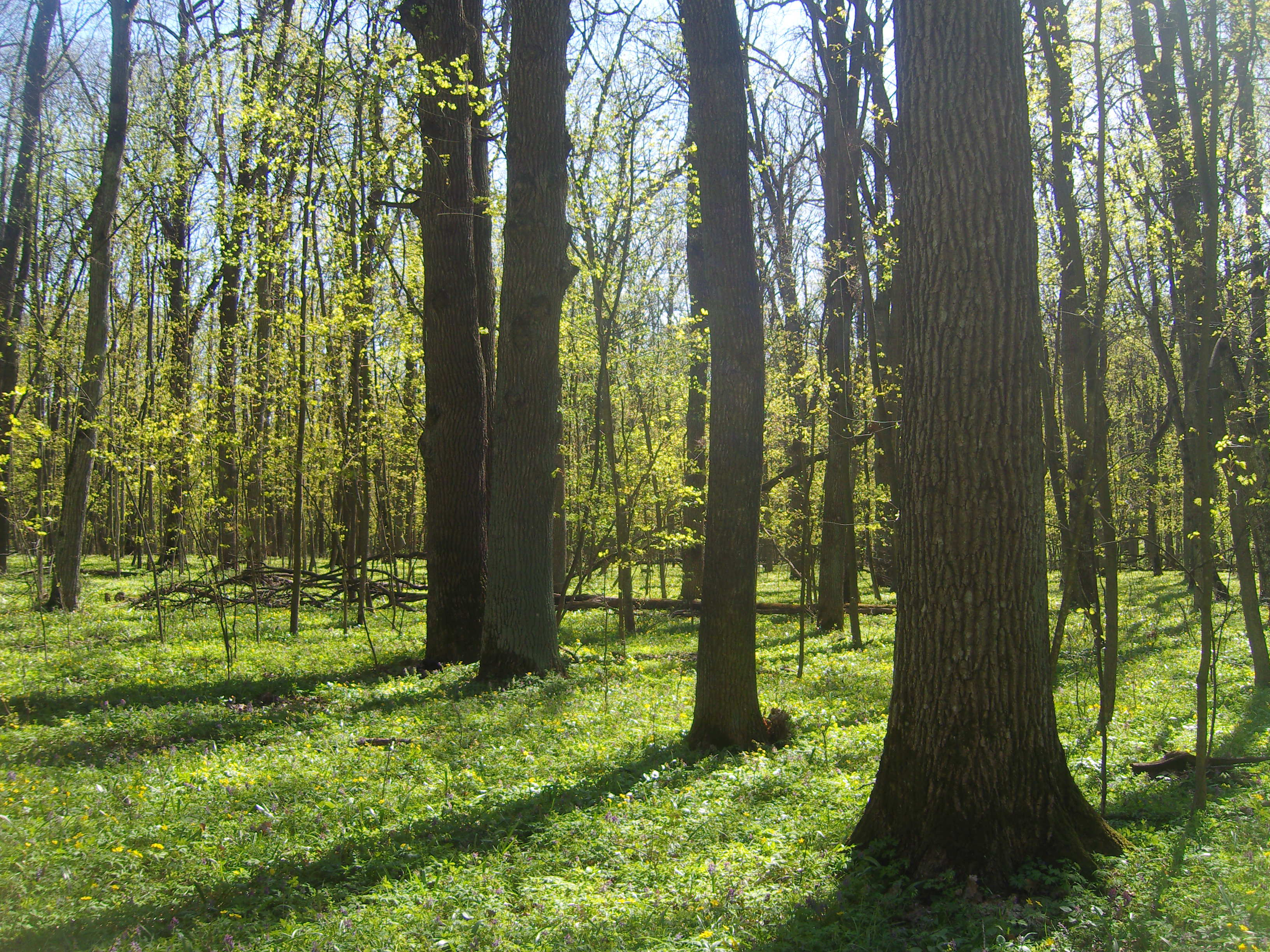
- Belogorye Zapovednik

- Location within Russia
- Location: Belgorod Oblast
- Nearest city: Belgorod
- Coordinates: 50°37′12″N 35°58′12″E
- Area: 2,131 hectares (5,266 acres; 8 sq mi)
- Established: 1935
- Governing body: Ministry of Natural Resources and Environment (Russia)
- Website: http://www.zapovednik-belogorye.ru/

Belogorye Nature Reserve (Russian: Белогорье заповедник) (also Belogor'e) is a Russian "zapovednik" (strict nature reserve), one of the last intact riverine old-growth oak forests (some oaks being over 300 years old), which was once representative of the East European forest-steppe. The reserve is one of the oldest and smallest nature reserves in Russia, first formed in 1924 but reorganized several times since. It is on the southwestern slope of the Central Hills on the western edge of Russia. The reserve is situated in the Belgorodsky District of Belgorod Oblast. The reserve was created in 1935, and covers an area of 2,131 ha (8.23 sq mi).

== Topography ==
The Belogorye Reserve is actually a collection of five separate sectors that are 10 to 75 km apart. The western two are in the basin of the Dnieper River, the other two in the basin of the Don River.

- "Worskla Forest" (1,038 ha), a forested section near the village of Borisov, 30 km west of Belgorod. Upland oak forest, surrounded on three sides by the Vorskla River.
- "Ostrasevy" (90 ha), a network of gullies and ravines, 3 km long and 200–300 meters wide, along Gostenki River, with forb meadow steppe vegetation on 45 degree slopes, and 35 species of rare and vulnerable steppe plants.
- "Bald Mountain" (170 hectares, with a 1 km security buffer) and "Yamskaya Steppe" (Tselinnaya feather-forb steppes), near the town of Stary Oskol. Black-soil slopes over limestone create a complex soil terrain that supports a scientifically important botanical site: over 570 species of vascular plants are found in a very small area.
- "Izgorya Walls" (267 ha), a notable limestone formation of chalk hills near Novooskolsky, on the Oskol River. Very complex terrain and soil habitats in a very small area supporting 710 species of vascular plants.

The overall clusters is on the southwestern edge of the Central Highlands, about 650 km south of Moscow, with two of the sectors are about 15 km from the border with Ukraine.

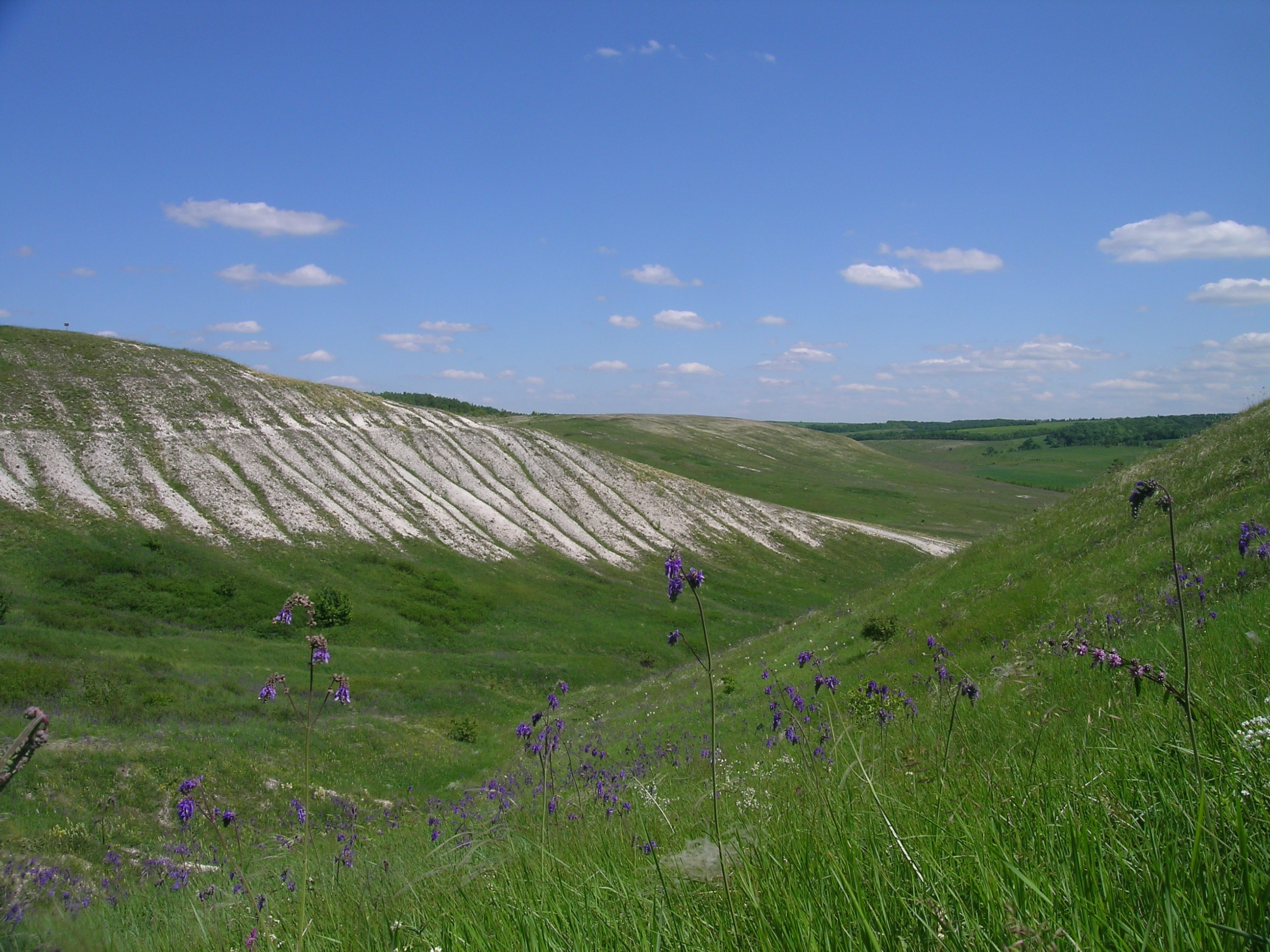
Izgorya Walls

The terrain sits on Cretaceous deposits of limestone; the resulting karst topography is one of ravines, hills, and caves which appear as "steppe saucers" on the surface. Elevations range between 100 meters to 230 meters above sea level.

== Climate and ecoregion ==
Belogorye is located in the East European forest steppe ecoregion, a transition zone between the broadleaf forests of the north and the grasslands to the south.. This ecoregion is characterized by a mosaic of forests, steppe, and riverine wetlands. The average temperature in January +8.1 C, and in July +19.9 C.

The climate of Belogorye is Humid continental climate, warm summer (Köppen climate classification (Dfb)). This climate is characterized by large swings in temperature, both diurnally and seasonally, with mild summers and cold, snowy winters.

== Flora and fauna ==
The Forest on the Vorskla sector is over 20 meters above the water table, lower than the tree roots can reach, so the forest is an upland community depending on precipitation: English oak, European ash, Norway maple, small-leaved lime, and Ulmus glabra. The old-growth forest is particularly important for the 60-70 nesting species of birds, over half which are Passerine (perching songbirds), with many that dwell in shrubs and hollow trees.

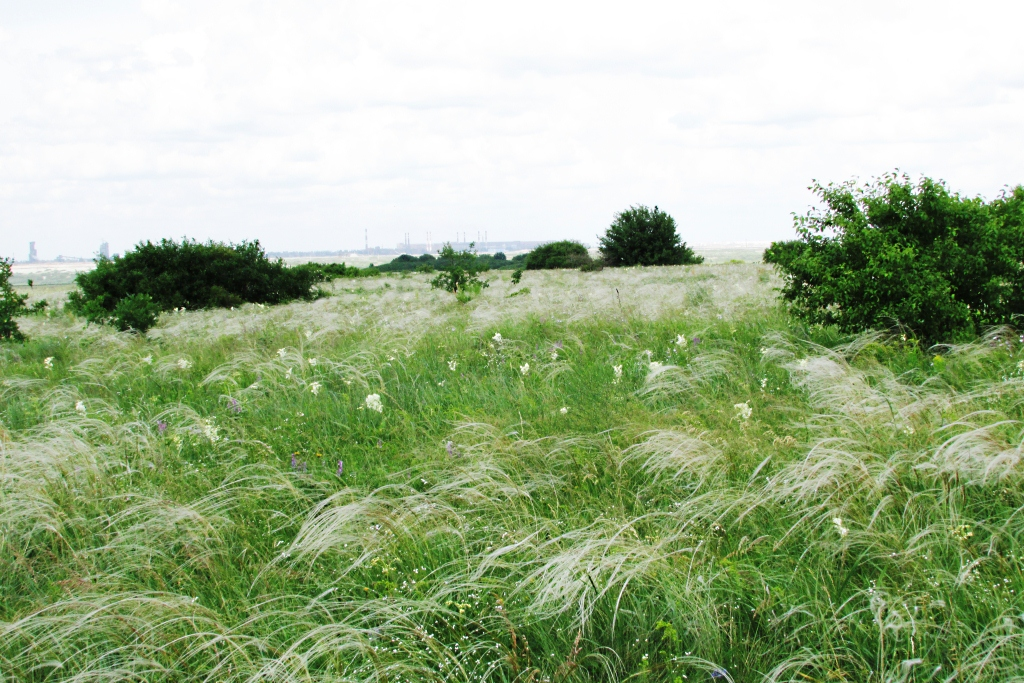
Feather Forb Meadow on Yamskaya Steppe

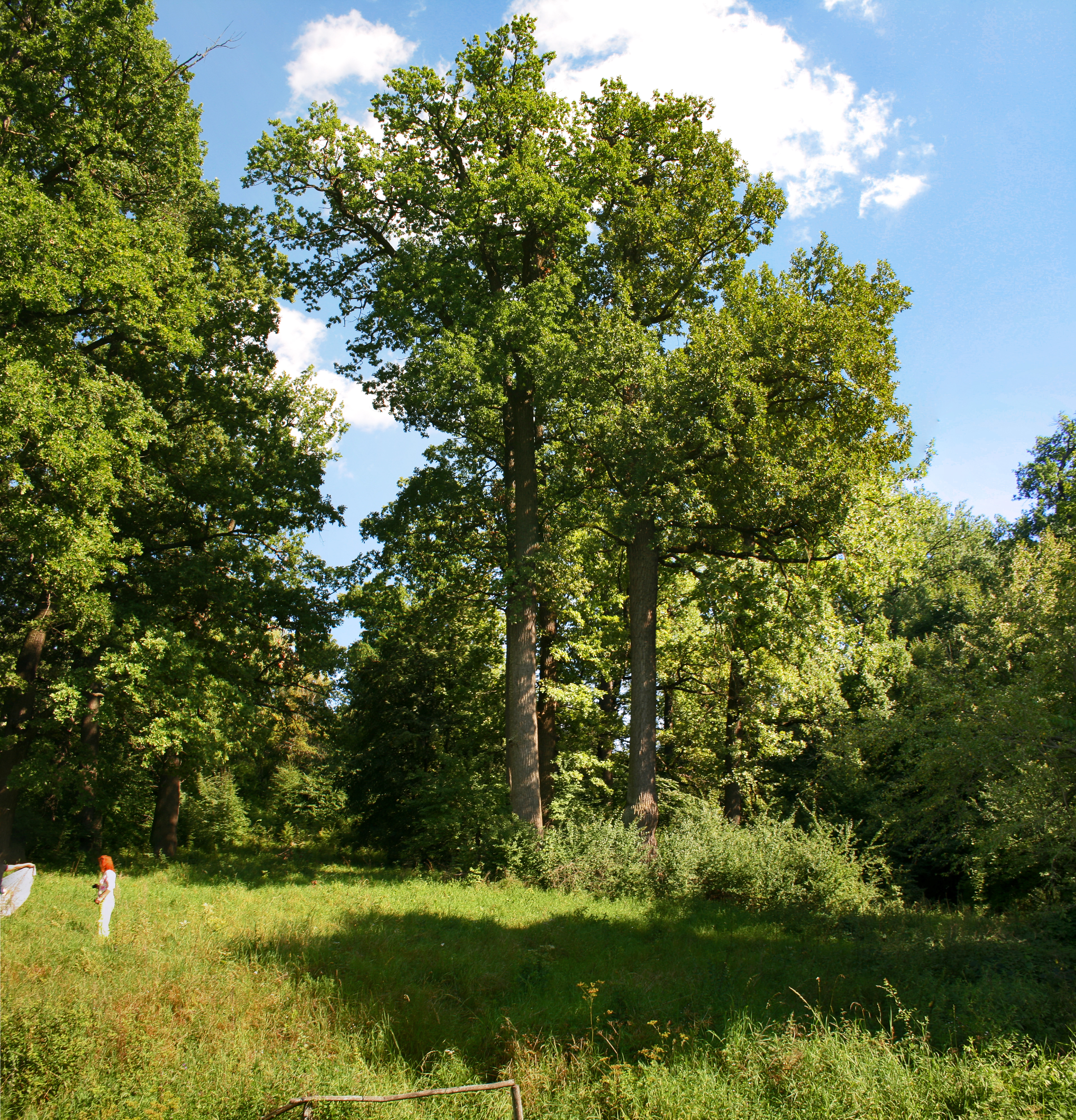
English Oak, new Borisov

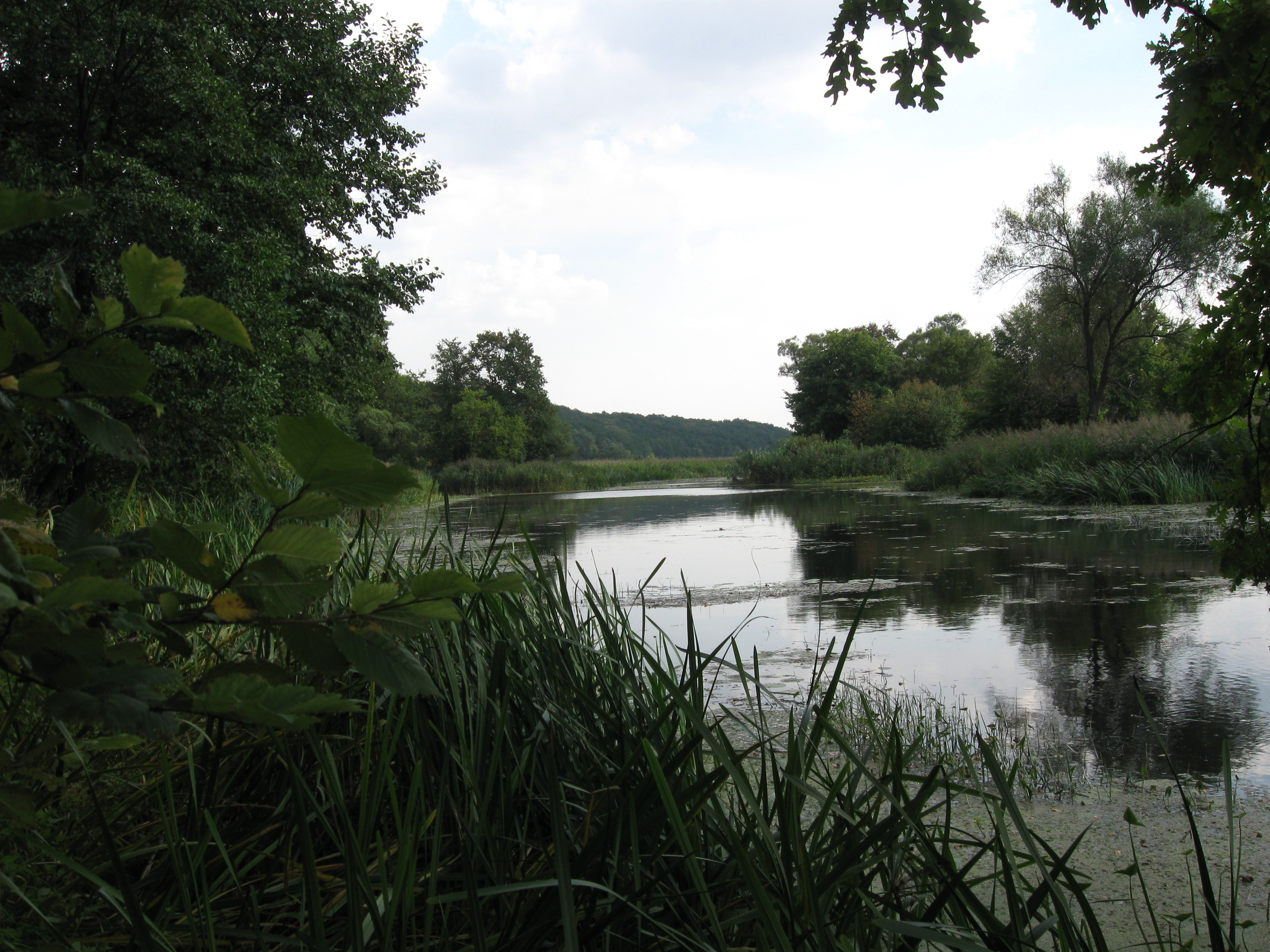
Vorskla River

== Ecotourism ==
There is a nature museum and arboretum run by the reserve in the village of Borisovka. The Belgorye Reserve is mostly closed to the general public, although scientists and those with "environmental education" purposes can make arrangements with park management for visits. For the public, guided tours can be arranged for groups by contacting reserve management in advance. Public access is also available in groups of 5–20 with reserve guides for a fee – the typical hike is 1.5 to 2 hours. Public access for school group tours are free.

== See also ==
- List of Russian Nature Reserves (class 1a 'zapovedniks')
