= Borisovka, Uglovsky District, Altai Krai =

Borisovka Борисовка
- Selo
- Location within Altai Krai Location within Russia
- Coordinates: 51°07′N 80°13′E
- Country: Russia
- Region: Altai Krai
- District: Uglovsky District
- Time zone: UTC+7:00

Borisovka (Russian: Борисовка) is a rural locality (a selo) in Laptevsky Selsoviet, Uglovsky District, Altai Krai, Russia. The population was 232 as of 2013. It was founded in 1923. There are 3 streets.

== Geography ==
Borisovka is located 47 km south of Uglovskoye (the district's administrative centre) by road. Laptev Log is the nearest rural locality.
