= Borisovka, Sharansky District, Republic of Bashkortostan =

Borisovka Борисовка
- Village
- Location within Bashkortostan Location within Russia
- Coordinates: 54°57′N 54°19′E
- Country: Russia
- Region: Bashkortostan
- District: Sharansky District
- Time zone: UTC+5:00

Borisovka (Russian: Борисовка) is a rural locality (a village) in Michurinsky Selsoviet, Sharansky District, Bashkortostan, Russia. The population was 82 as of 2010. There are 2 streets.

== Geography ==
Borisovka is located 31 km northeast of Sharan (the district's administrative centre) by road. Novopetrovka is the nearest rural locality.
