= Borisovka, Volokonovsky District, Belgorod Oblast =

Borisovka Борисовка
- Selo
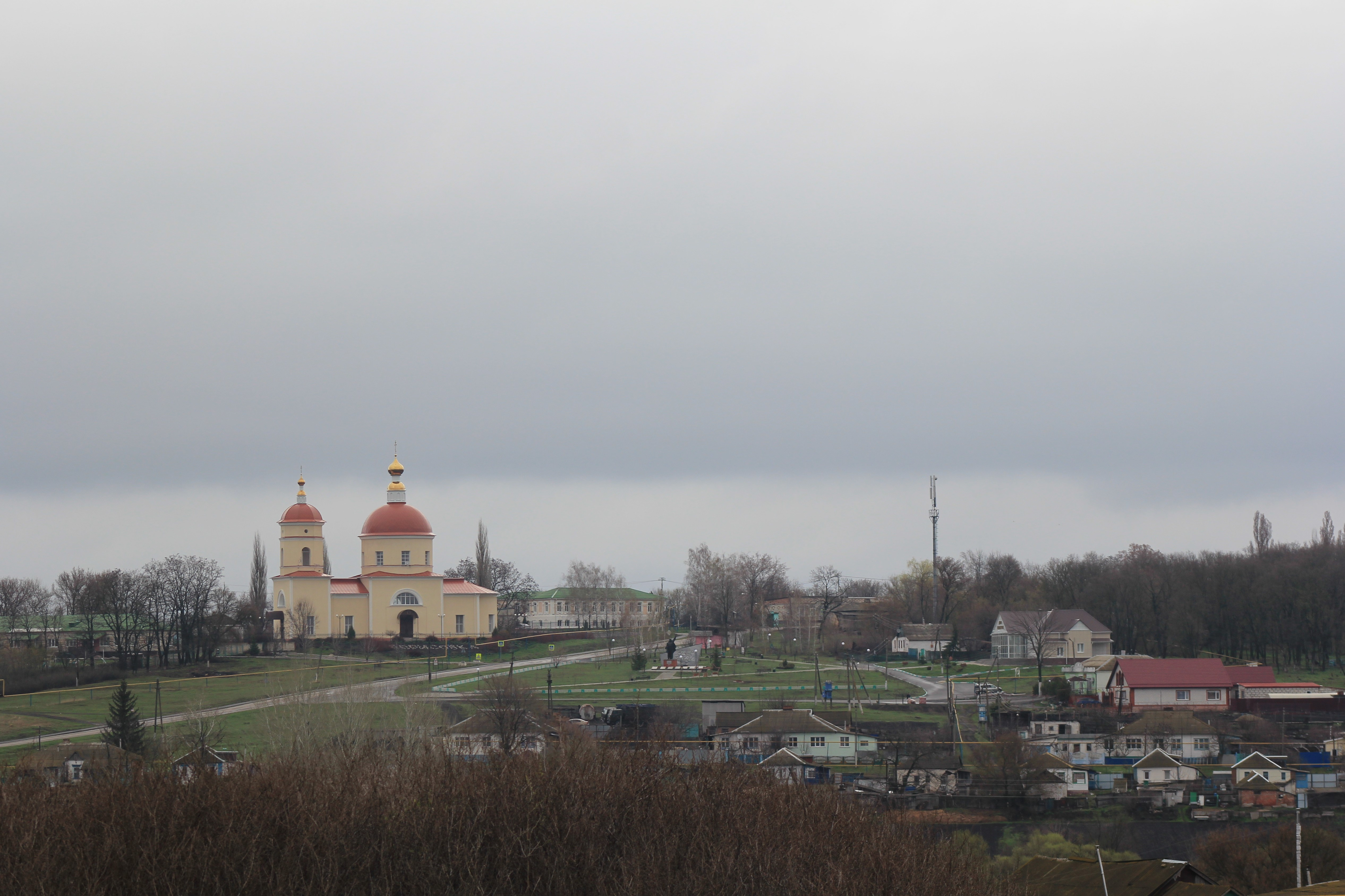
- Interactive map of Borisovka
- Location of Borisovka Borisovka (Russia)
- Coordinates: 50°21′N 37°38′E
- Country: Russia
- Federal subject: Belgorod Oblast

Population
  - Estimate (2010): 673 )
- Time zone: UTC+3 (MSK)
- Postal code: 309675
- OKTMO ID: 14630404101

Borisovka (Russian: Борисовка) is a rural locality (a selo) in Volokonovsky District, Belgorod Oblast, Russia. The population was 673 as of 2010. There are 5 streets.

== Geography ==
Borisovka is located 28 km southwest of Volokonovka (the district's administrative centre) by road. Kiselev is the nearest rural locality.
