= Kardagushevo =

Kardagushevo Кардагушево
- Village
- Location within Bashkortostan Location within Russia
- Coordinates: 56°16′N 55°36′E
- Country: Russia
- Region: Bashkortostan
- District: Tatyshlinsky District
- Time zone: UTC+5:00

Kardagushevo (Russian: Кардагушево; Bashkir: Ҡарҙағош, Qarźağoş) is a rural locality (a village) in Kudashevsky Selsoviet, Tatyshlinsky District, Bashkortostan, Russia. The population was 214 as of 2010. There are 4 streets.

== Geography ==
Kardagushevo is located 18 km west of Verkhniye Tatyshly (the district's administrative centre) by road. 1-y Yanaul is the nearest rural locality.
