= Borisovka, Yegoryevsky District, Altai Krai =

Borisovka Борисовка
- Selo
- Location within Altai Krai Location within Russia
- Coordinates: 51°33′N 80°46′E
- Country: Russia
- Region: Altai Krai
- District: Yegoryevsky District
- Time zone: UTC+7:00

Borisovka (Russian: Борисовка) is a rural locality (a selo) in Kruglo-Sementsovsky Selsoviet, Yegoryevsky District, Altai Krai, Russia. The population was 200 as of 2013. There are 3 streets.

== Geography ==
Borisovka is located 26 km south of Novoyegoryevskoye (the district's administrative centre) by road. Shubinka is the nearest rural locality.
