= Borisovka, Aurgazinsky District, Republic of Bashkortostan =

Borisovka Борисовка
- Village
- Location within Bashkortostan Location within Russia
- Coordinates: 54°05′N 56°00′E
- Country: Russia
- Region: Bashkortostan
- District: Aurgazinsky District
- Time zone: UTC+5:00

Borisovka (Russian: Борисовка) is a rural locality (a village) in Ibrayevsky Selsoviet, Aurgazinsky District, Bashkortostan, Russia. The population was 5 as of 2010. There is 1 street.

== Geography ==
Borisovka is located 19 km northeast of Tolbazy (the district's administrative centre) by road. Berlek is the nearest rural locality.
