= Borisovsky District =

Borisovsky District Борисовский район (Russian)
- District
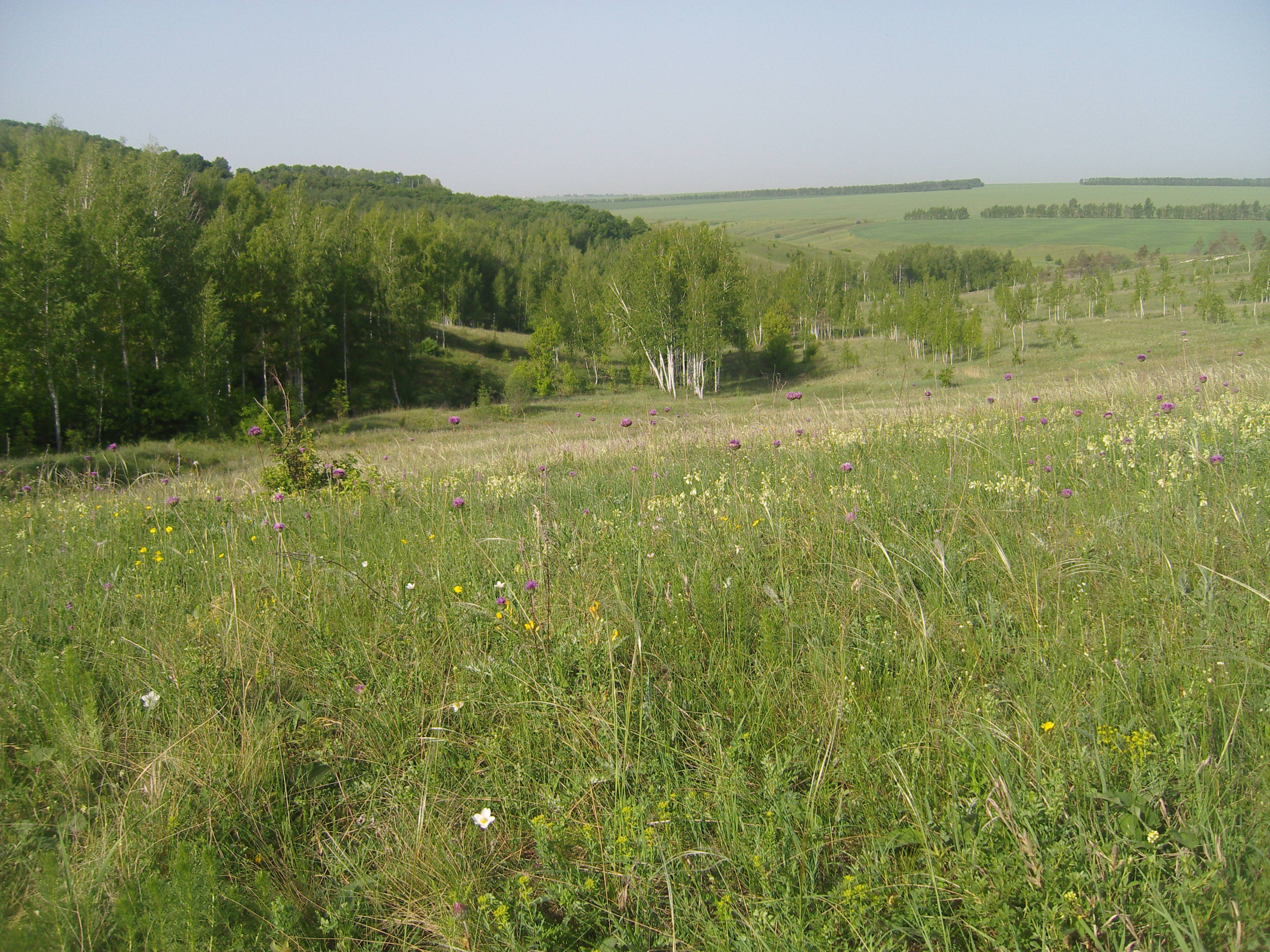
- Scene in Belogorye Nature Reserve, in Borisovsky District

- Flag Coat of arms
- Location of Borisovsky District in Belgorod Oblast
- Coordinates: 50°36′15″N 36°00′56″E
- Country: Russia
- Federal subject: Belgorod Oblast
- Established: 30 July 1928
- Administrative center: Borisovka

Area
  - Total: 650.30 km^{2} (251.08 sq mi)

Population (2010 Census)
  - Total: 26,252
  - Estimate (2015): 25,638
  - Density: 40.369/km^{2} (104.56/sq mi)
  - Urban: 52.9%
  - Rural: 47.1%

Administrative structure
  - Inhabited localities: 1 urban-type settlements, 33 rural localities

Municipal structure
  - Municipally incorporated as: Borisovsky Municipal District
  - Municipal divisions: 1 urban settlements, 9 rural settlements
- Time zone: UTC+3 (MSK)
- OKTMO ID: 14615000
- Website: http://borisovka.info/

Borisovsky District (Russian: Бори́совский райо́н) is an administrative district (raion), one of the twenty-one in Belgorod Oblast, Russia. As a municipal division, it is incorporated as Borisovsky Municipal District. It is located in the west of the oblast. The area of the district is 650.3 square kilometers (251.1 sq mi). Its administrative center is the urban locality (a settlement) of Borisovka. Population: 23,904 (2021 census); 26,252 (2010 census); 26,282 (2002 Census); 52,261 (1989 Soviet census). The population of Borisovka accounts for 52.5% of the district's total population.

== Geography ==
Borisovsky District is in the southwest of Belgorod Oblast, on the border with Ukraine. It is bordered on the south by Bohodukhiv Raion, Kharkiv Oblast of Ukraine, on the west by Grayvoronsky District, on the north by Rakityansky District, and on the east by Yakovlevsky District and Belgorodsky District. The administrative center of the district is the town of Borisovka, Belgorod Oblast. The district is 25 kilometres (16 mi) west of the city of Belgorod, and is 45 kilometres (28 mi) north of the Ukrainian city of Kharkiv.

The terrain is hilly plain averaging 200 metres (660 ft) above sea level; the district lies on the Orel-Kursk plateau of the Central Russian Upland. The major river through the district is the Vorskla River, which flows east to west through the district, with grey soils to the north of the river and black earth soils to the south of the river. The forest of the Vorskla River is partially protected by Belogorye Nature Reserve.
