= Yumaguzino =

Yumaguzino Юмагузино
- Selo
- Location within Bashkortostan Location within Russia
- Coordinates: 52°53′N 56°23′E
- Country: Russia
- Region: Bashkortostan
- District: Kugarchinsky District
- Time zone: UTC+5:00

Yumaguzino (Russian: Юмагузино; Bashkir: Йомағужа, Yomağuja) is a rural locality (a selo) and the administrative centre of Yumaguzinsky Selsoviet, Kugarchinsky District, Bashkortostan, Russia. The population was 4,564 as of 2010. There are 37 streets.

== Geography ==
Yumaguzino is located 35 km northwest of Mrakovo (the district's administrative centre) by road. Ulutup is the nearest rural locality.
