= Borisovka, Borisovsky District, Belgorod Oblast =

Borisovka Борисовка
- Town
- Flag Coat of arms
- Interactive map of Borisovka
- Location of Borisovka Borisovka (Belgorod Oblast)
- Coordinates: 50°35′00″N 36°01′00″E
- Country: Russia
- Federal subject: Belgorod Oblast
- Founded: 1695
- Elevation: 140 m (460 ft)

Population (2010 Census)
  - Total: 13,896
  - Estimate (2021): 12,553 (−9.7%)

Administrative status
  - Capital of: Town of oblast significance of Borisovka, Borisovsky District<

Municipal status
  - Municipal district: Alexeyevsky Municipal District
  - Urban settlement: Borisovka Urban Settlement
  - Capital of: Borisovsky Municipal District, Borisovka Urban Settlement
- Time zone: UTC+3 (MSK)
- Postal code: 309340
- OKTMO ID: 14615151051

Borisovka (Russian: Бори́совка) is an urban locality (a settlement) in Belgorod Oblast, Russia. It is the administrative center of Borisovsky District.

The settlement is included in the list of historical cities of Russia in 2002. Population: 12,553 (2021 census); 13,896 (2010 census); 13,083 (2002 census); 13,002 (1989 Soviet census).

== Geography ==
Located on the Vorskla River (a tributary of the Dnieper), 7 kilometres (4.3 mi) to the east of the railway station Novoborisovka (in Lgov - Kharkov line).

In the town of Borisovka there are widespread natural landscapes. On the northern outskirts of the settlement there are two large forest areas - Forest on the Vorskla (section Belogorie Reserve, adjacent to the streets Kovalevka, Rudy, Sovkhoznaya) and Small Forest (adjacent to the streets October and Forestry). Inside Borisovka village located fen reed-sedge marsh area of 48 hectares. Also passes through the village of Vorskla River floodplain.

== History ==
Sloboda Borisovka known since 1695, was part of the Hotmyzhskogo County. In 1705 it becomes the domain of Boris Sheremetev. It was here that he founded one of the largest musical theater, later translated in Kuskovo. During the preparation of the Battle of Poltava Hotmyzhsk along with Belgorod was the rear base of Russian troops. According to the census of 1877, the town had population of 17,502 residents.

After the October revolution of 1917 settlement was transformed into Borisovka Village, which was a part of Graivoronsky District in Kursk Oblast.

It was granted status of urban-type settlement in 1959.

On December 20, 2004, in accordance with the Law of the Belgorod Oblast number 159 the town was designated as a municipality Borisovka with urban settlement status.
