= Sterlibashevsky District =

Sterlibashevsky District Стерлибашевский район (Russian)
- District

Other transcription(s)
  - Bashkir: Стәрлебаш районы
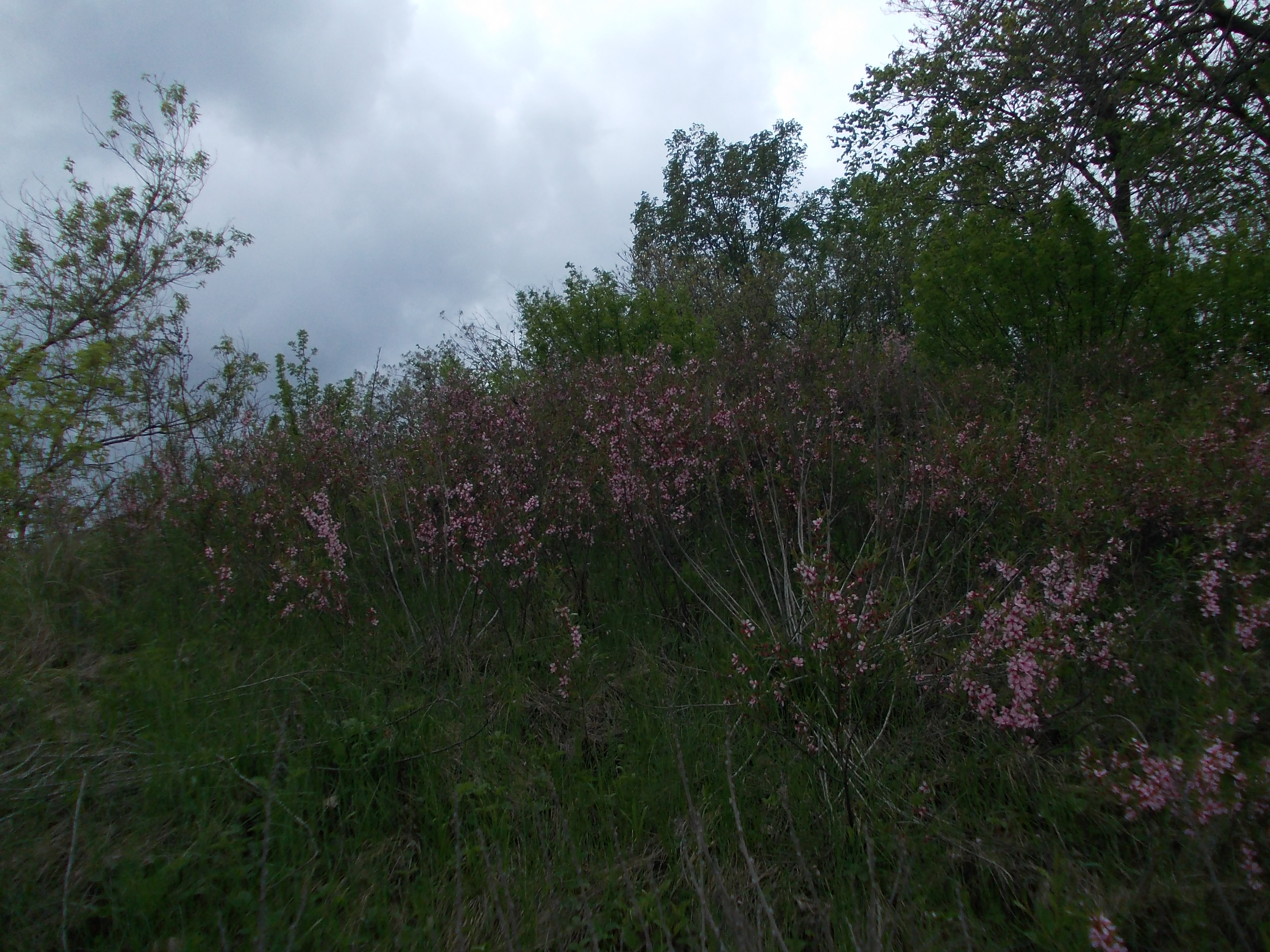
- Thickets of steppe cherry, Sterlibashevsky District

- Flag Coat of arms
- Location of Sterlibashevsky District in the Republic of Bashkortostan
- Coordinates: 53°26′N 55°16′E
- Country: Russia
- Federal subject: Republic of Bashkortostan
- Established: August 20, 1930 (first); March 3, 1964 (second)
- Administrative center: Sterlibashevo

Area
  - Total: 1,609 km^{2} (621 sq mi)

Population (2010 Census)
  - Total: 20,217
  - Estimate (2018): 17,911 (−11.4%)
  - Density: 12.56/km^{2} (32.54/sq mi)
  - Urban: 0%
  - Rural: 100%

Administrative structure
  - Administrative divisions: 15 Selsoviets
  - Inhabited localities: 69 rural localities

Municipal structure
  - Municipally incorporated as: Sterlibashevsky Municipal District
  - Municipal divisions: 0 urban settlements, 15 rural settlements
- Time zone: UTC+5 (MSK+2)
- OKTMO ID: 80648000
- Website: http://www.admsterlibash.ru

Population of Sterlibashevsky District
- 2010 Census: 20,217
- 2002 Census: 22,007
- 1989 Census: 21,599
- 1979 Census: 26,573

Sterlibashevsky District (Russian: Стерлиба́шевский райо́н; Bashkir and Tatar: Стәрлебаш районы, Stärlebaş rayonı) is an administrative and municipal district (raion), one of the fifty-four in the Republic of Bashkortostan, Russia. It is located in the west of the republic and borders with Miyakinsky District in the north, Sterlitamaksky District in the northeast and east, Meleuzovsky District in the southeast, Fyodorovsky District in the south, and with Orenburg Oblast in the west. The area of the district is 1,609 square kilometers (621 sq mi). Its administrative center is the rural locality (a selo) of Sterlibashevo. As of the 2010 Census, the total population of the district was 20,217, with the population of Sterlibashevo accounting for 29.3% of that number.

== History ==
The district was established on August 20, 1930 as Karagushevsky District (Карагушевский район) with the administrative center in the selo of Kardagushevo. On February 20, 1932, the administrative center was moved to Sterlibashevo, and the district was consequently renamed Sterlibashevsky. On February 1, 1963, the district was split between Sterlitamaksky and Meleuzovsky Rural Districts, but was restored on March 3, 1964.

== Population ==
According to the forecast of the Ministry of Economic Development of Russia, the population will be:

- 2024 - 17.48 thousand people
- 2035 - 15.72 thousand people

The population of district by the year
2002	2008	2009	2010	2012	2013	2014	2015	2016	2017
22007	20628	20583	20217	19926	19551	19115	18670	18414	18207

According to the Russian Census 2010: Tatars - 54.3%, Bashkirs - 36.2%, Russians - 5.9%, Chuvash people - 2.3%, others - 1.3%.

== Administrative and municipal status ==
Within the framework of administrative divisions, Sterlibashevsky District is one of the fifty-four in the Republic of Bashkortostan. The district is divided into fifteen selsoviets, comprising sixty-nine rural localities. As a municipal division, the district is incorporated as Sterlibashevsky Municipal District. Its fifteen selsoviets are incorporated as fifteen rural settlements within the municipal district. The selo of Sterlibashevo serves as the administrative center of both the administrative and municipal district.

== Localities in sterlibashevsky ==
- Sterlibashevo is a rural locality serving as the administrative center of Sterlibashevsky District, located in the Republic of Bashkortostan, Russia. It is the central hub for governance and services within the district. It latitude and longitude are 53.44048489999999, 55.2588033, respectively.
- Mukhametdaminovo is another rural locality within the Sterlibashevsky Selsoviet of Sterlibashevsky District, Bashkortostan. It contributes to the local agricultural and community life of the district. It exact geographical coordinates, latitude 53.4144571 and longitude 55.2094059.
- Gumbazy is a rural settlement also situated in Sterlibashevsky Selsoviet, within Sterlibashevsky District. It lies approximately 3.5 km east of the district center, Sterlibashevo, maintaining close proximity to the administrative hub. It exact geographical coordinates, latitude 53.419444 and longitude 55.301111.

These areas makes up part of the interconnected rural landscape of Sterlibashevsky District, with Sterlibashevo as the central administrative point and surrounding villages contributing to the region's rural economy and lifestyle.

== Location ==
Sterlibashevsky District is located in the Republic of Bashkortostan, within the Ural region of Russia. This area lies in the eastern part of European Russia, forming a key part of the broader Urals, which serve as the natural divide between Europe and Asia. Geographically, Sterlibashevsky District is positioned in Eastern Europe, contributing to the diverse cultural and natural landscape of the Ural region and Europe as a whole.

== Mountains ==
There are 4 named mountains in Sterlibashevsky District. In terms of the highest peaks in the region, Gora Biiktau stands as the tallest, with an elevation of 447 meters and a prominence of 139 meters. Following it is Gora Saryyeogatau, which reaches 379 meters with a prominence of 56 meters. Iskimudyak comes next with an elevation of 275 meters and a modest prominence of 8 meters. Finally, Yangisagil has an elevation of 258 meters and a prominence of 18 meters. Together, these peaks contribute to the varied topography of the region.
