= Sterlibashevo =

Sterlibashevo Стерлибашево
- Selo
- Flag Coat of arms
- Interactive map of Sterlibashevo
- Location of Sterlibashevo Sterlibashevo (Bashkortostan)
- Coordinates: 53°26′14″N 55°15′31″E
- Country: Russia
- Federal subject: Bashkortostan
- Administrative district: Sterlibashevsky District
- Founded: 1680

Population (2010 Census)
  - Total: 5,930
  - Estimate (2010): 5,930 (0%)

Administrative status
  - Capital of: Sterlibashevsky District
- Time zone: UTC+5 (MSK+2)
- OKTMO ID: 80648445101

Sterlibashevo (Russian: Стерлиба́шево; Bashkir: Стәрлебаш, Stärlebaş) is a rural locality (a selo) and the administrative center of Sterlibashevsky District in the Republic of Bashkortostan, Russia. Population: 5,930 (2010 census); 5,775 (2002 census); 5,546 (1989 Soviet census).
