= Zimovnoye =

Zimovnoye Зимовное
- Selo
- Location within Belgorod Oblast Location within Russia
- Coordinates: 50°32′N 37°12′E
- Country: Russia
- Region: Belgorod Oblast
- District: Shebekinsky District
- Time zone: UTC+3:00

Zimovnoye (Russian: Зимовное) is a rural locality (a selo) in Shebekinsky District, Belgorod Oblast, Russia. The population was 407 as of 2010.

== Geography ==
Zimovnoye is located 49 km northeast of Shebekino (the district's administrative centre) by road. Verkhneberyozovo is the nearest rural locality.
