= Bulanovka, Belgorod Oblast =

Bulanovka Булановка
- Selo
- Location within Belgorod Oblast Location within Russia
- Coordinates: 50°36′N 37°26′E
- Country: Russia
- Region: Belgorod Oblast
- District: Shebekinsky District
- Time zone: UTC+3:00

Bulanovka (Russian: Булановка) is a rural locality (a selo) in Shebekinsky District, Belgorod Oblast, Russia. The population was 673 as of 2010. There are 12 streets.

== Geography ==
Bulanovka is located 59 km northeast of Shebekino (the district's administrative centre) by road. Popovka is the nearest rural locality.
