= Rzhevka, Shebekinsky District, Belgorod Oblast =

Rzhevka Ржевка
- Selo
- Location within Belgorod Oblast Location within Russia
- Coordinates: 50°26′N 36°59′E
- Country: Russia
- Region: Belgorod Oblast
- District: Shebekinsky District
- Time zone: UTC+3:00

Rzhevka (Russian: Ржевка) is a rural locality (a selo) in Shebekinsky District, Belgorod Oblast, Russia. The population was 2,715 as of 2010. There are 21 streets.

== Geography ==
Rzhevka is located 10 km northeast of Shebekino (the district's administrative centre) by road. Nezhegol is the nearest rural locality.
