= Popovka, Shebekinsky District, Belgorod Oblast =

Popovka Поповка
- Selo
- Location within Belgorod Oblast Location within Russia
- Coordinates: 50°33′N 37°27′E
- Country: Russia
- Region: Belgorod Oblast
- District: Shebekinsky District
- Time zone: UTC+3:00

Popovka (Russian: Поповка) is a rural locality (a selo) in Shebekinsky District, Belgorod Oblast, Russia. The population was 510 as of 2010. There is 1 street.

== Geography ==
Popovka is located 53 km northeast of Shebekino (the district's administrative centre) by road. Bershakovo is the nearest rural locality.
