= Strelitsa-Pervaya =

Strelitsa-Pervaya Стрелица-Первая
- Selo
- Location within Belgorod Oblast Location within Russia
- Coordinates: 50°39′N 37°22′E
- Country: Russia
- Region: Belgorod Oblast
- District: Shebekinsky District
- Time zone: UTC+3:00

Strelitsa-Pervaya (Russian: Стрелица-Первая) is a rural locality (a selo) in Shebekinsky District, Belgorod Oblast, Russia. The population was 297 as of 2010. There are 2 streets.

== Geography ==
Strelitsa-Pervaya is located 57 km northeast of Shebekino (the district's administrative centre) by road. Zalomnoye is the nearest rural locality.
