= Verkhneye Beryozovo =

Verkhneye Beryozovo Верхнее Берёзово
- Selo
- Location within Belgorod Oblast Location within Russia
- Coordinates: 50°34′N 37°13′E
- Country: Russia
- Region: Belgorod Oblast
- District: Shebekinsky District
- Time zone: UTC+3:00

Verkhneye Beryozovo (Russian: Верхнее Берёзово) is a rural locality (a selo) in Shebekinsky District, Belgorod Oblast, Russia. The population was 648 as of 2010. There are 12 streets.

== Geography ==
Verkhneye Beryozovo is located 52 km northeast of Shebekino (the district's administrative centre) by road. Titovka is the nearest rural locality.
