= Arkhangelskoye, Shebekinsky District, Belgorod Oblast =

Arkhangelskoye Архангельское
- Selo
- Location within Belgorod Oblast Location within Russia
- Coordinates: 50°21′N 36°47′E
- Country: Russia
- Region: Belgorod Oblast
- District: Shebekinsky District

Population (2010)
  - Total: 623
- Time zone: UTC+3:00

Arkhangelskoye (Russian: Архангельское) is a rural locality (a selo), Shebekinsky urban district, Shebekinsky District, Belgorod Oblast, Russia. The population was 623 as of 2010. There are 5 streets.

== Geography ==
Arkhangelskoye is located 13 km southwest of Shebekino (the district's administrative centre) by road. Novaya Tavolzhanka is the nearest rural locality.

== History ==
Arkhangelskoye was part of the Novotavolzhanskoye Rural Settlement (a type of municipality) from 20 December 2004 to 19 April 2018. Today it is part of the Shebekinsky urban district, which is congruent with the Shebekinsky District.
