= Malomikhaylovka =

Malomikhaylovka Маломихайловка
- Selo
- Location within Belgorod Oblast Location within Russia
- Coordinates: 50°25′N 37°04′E
- Country: Russia
- Region: Belgorod Oblast
- District: Shebekinsky District
- Time zone: UTC+3:00

Malomikhaylovka (Russian: Маломихайловка) is a rural locality (a selo) in Shebekinsky District, Belgorod Oblast, Russia. The population was 758 as of 2010. There are 9 streets.

== Geography ==
Malomikhaylovka is located 20 km east of Shebekino (the district's administrative centre) by road. Shchigorevka is the nearest rural locality.
