= Zhelobok =

Zhelobok Желобок
- Khutor
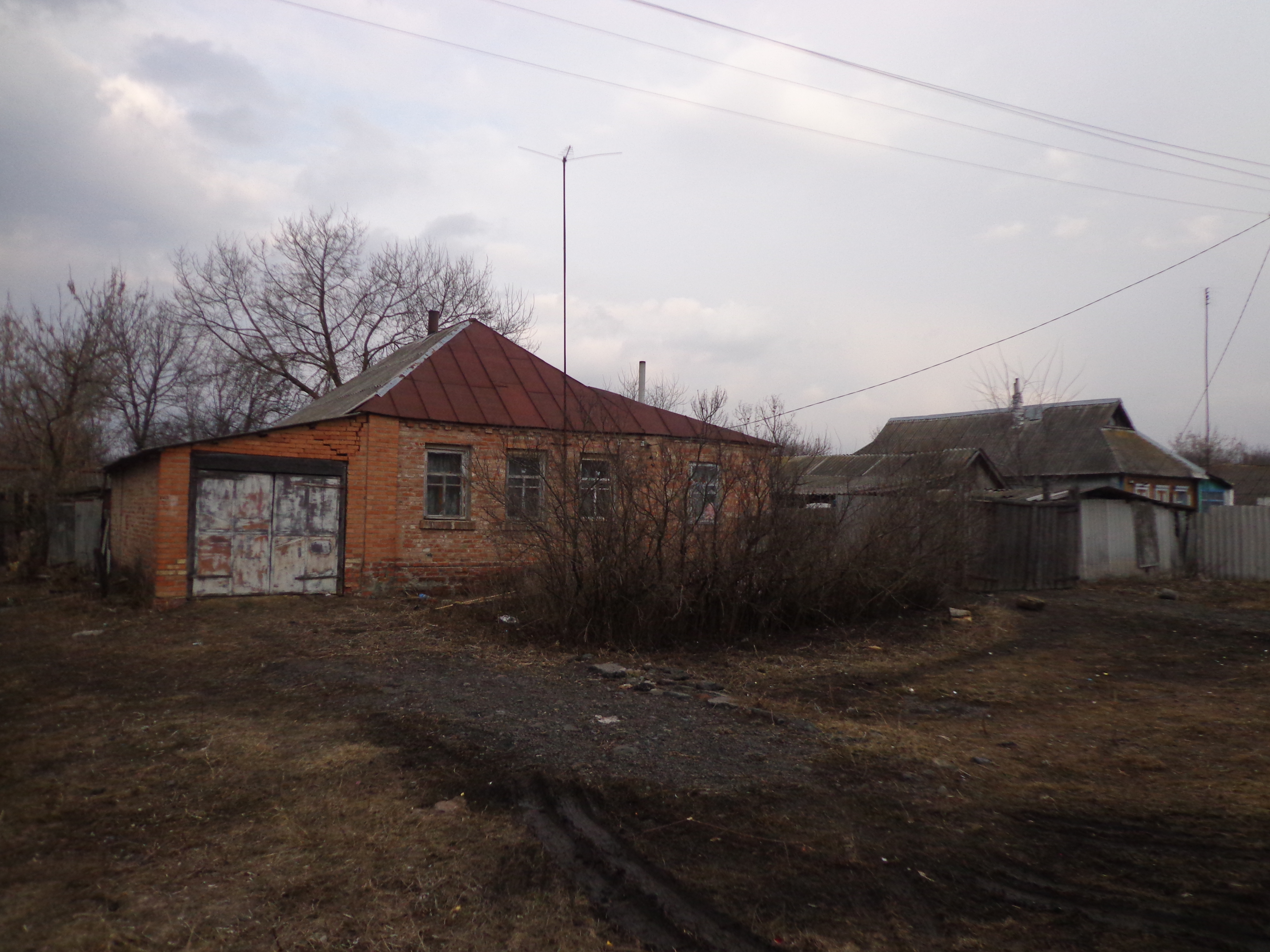
- Building in Zhelobok

- Location within Belgorod Oblast Location within Russia
- Coordinates: 50°30′N 37°25′E
- Country: Russia
- Region: Belgorod Oblast
- District: Shebekinsky District
- Time zone: UTC+3:00

Zhelobok (Russian: Желобок) is a rural locality (a khutor) in Shebekinsky District, Belgorod Oblast, Russia. The population was 21 as of 2010. There is 1 street.

== Geography ==
Zhelobok is located 52 km northeast of Shebekino (the district's administrative centre) by road. Babenkov is the nearest rural locality.
