= Kozmodemyanovka, Belgorod Oblast =

Kozmodemyanovka Козьмодемьяновка
- Selo
- Location within Belgorod Oblast Location within Russia
- Coordinates: 50°27′N 37°07′E
- Country: Russia
- Region: Belgorod Oblast
- District: Shebekinsky District
- Time zone: UTC+3:00

Kozmodemyanovka (Russian: Козьмодемьяновка) is a rural locality (a selo) in Shebekinsky District, Belgorod Oblast, Russia. The population was 365 as of 2010. There are 9 streets.

== Geography ==
Kozmodemyanovka is located 26 km northeast of Shebekino (the district's administrative centre) by road. Starovshchina is the nearest rural locality.
