= Ziborovka =

Ziborovka Зиборовка
- Selo
- Location within Belgorod Oblast Location within Russia
- Coordinates: 50°22′N 36°40′E
- Country: Russia
- Region: Belgorod Oblast
- District: Shebekinsky District
- Time zone: UTC+3:00

Ziborovka (Russian: Зиборовка) is a rural locality (a selo) in Shebekinsky District, Belgorod Oblast, Russia. The population was 329 as of 2010. There are six streets.

== Geography ==
Ziborovka is located 31 km southwest of Shebekino (the district's administrative centre) by road. Nechayevka is the nearest rural locality.
