= Krapivny =

Rural localities in Russia

Krapivny (Russian: Крапивный; masculine), Krapivnaya (Крапивная; feminine), or Krapivnoye (Крапивное; neuter) is the name of several rural localities in Russia:

- Krapivnoye, Shebekinsky District, Belgorod Oblast, a selo in Shebekinsky District, Belgorod Oblast
- Krapivnoye, Yakovlevsky District, Belgorod Oblast, a selo in Yakovlevsky District, Belgorod Oblast
- Krapivnaya, a village in Serovsky District of Sverdlovsk Oblast
