= Surkovo =

Surkovo Сурково
- Selo
- Location within Belgorod Oblast Location within Russia
- Coordinates: 50°29′N 37°13′E
- Country: Russia
- Region: Belgorod Oblast
- District: Shebekinsky District
- Time zone: UTC+3:00

Surkovo (Russian: Сурково) is a rural locality (a selo) in Shebekinsky District, Belgorod Oblast, Russia. The population was 727 as of 2010. There are 4 streets.

== Geography ==
Surkovo is located 33 km northeast of Shebekino (the district's administrative centre) by road. Pervoye Tseplyayevo is the nearest rural locality.
