= Alexandrovka, Shebekinsky District, Belgorod Oblast =

Alexandrovka Александровка
- Selo
- Location within Belgorod Oblast Location within Russia
- Coordinates: 50°31′N 37°31′E
- Country: Russia
- Region: Belgorod Oblast
- District: Shebekinsky District
- Time zone: UTC+3:00

Alexandrovka (Russian: Александровка) is a rural locality (a selo) in Shebekinsky District, Belgorod Oblast, Russia. The population was 379 as of 2010. There are 2 streets.

== Geography ==
Alexandrovka is located 58 km northeast of Shebekino (the district's administrative centre) by road. Petrovka is the nearest rural locality.
