= Novaya Tavolzhanka =

Novaya Tavolzhanka Новая Таволжанка
- Selo
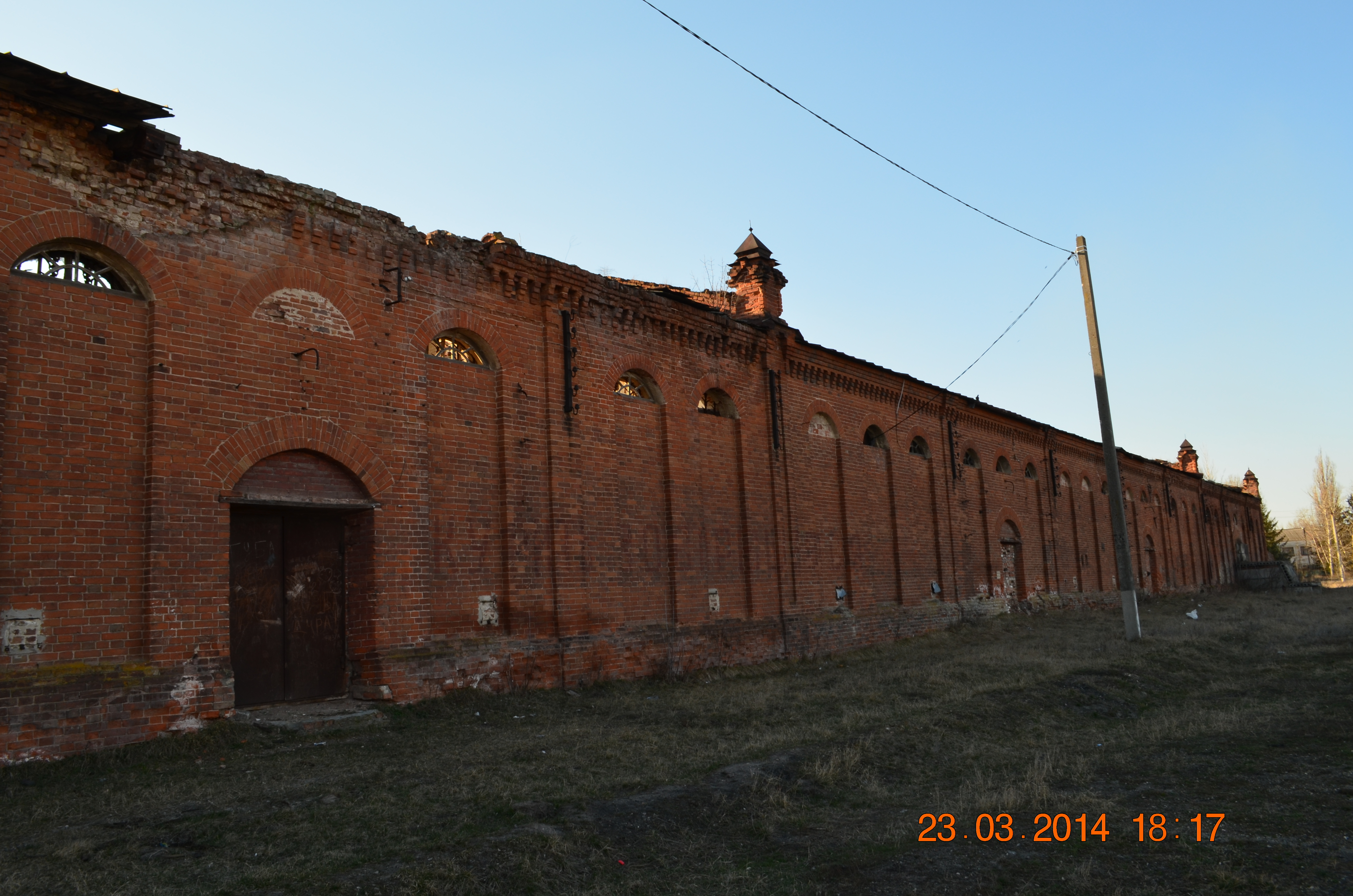
- Old sugar warehouses at the Botkino station

- Location within Belgorod Oblast Location within Russia
- Coordinates: 50°21′N 36°49′E
- Country: Russia
- Region: Belgorod Oblast
- District: Shebekinsky District

Population (2021)
  - Total: 5,288
- Time zone: UTC+3:00

Novaya Tavolzhanka (Russian: Новая Таволжанка) is a rural locality (a selo) in Shebekinsky District, Belgorod Oblast, Russia. Population: 5,288 (2021 census); 5,324 (2010 census); 4,989 (2002 census); There are 67 streets.

== Geography ==
Novaya Tavolzhanka is located 10 km (6.2 mi) northeast of Shebekino (the district's administrative centre) by road. Arkhangelskoye is the nearest rural locality.

== History ==
Novaya Tavolzhanka was the administrative centre of the Novotavolzhanskoye Rural Settlement (a type of municipality) from 20 December 2004 to 19 April 2018. Today it is part of the Shebekinsky urban district, which is congruent with the Shebekinsky District.

On December 16, 2022, the village came under fire, seemingly by Ukraine, during the invasion of the country by Russia. One of the shells hit the basement of the school, but, according to the governor of Belgorod Oblast, Vyacheslav Gladkov, there were no casualties or deaths. On February 19 and 20, 2023, repeated shelling of the village led to the deaths of 2 people (a woman and a 12-year-old girl).

On 5 June 2023, during the Belgorod Oblast incursions, the opposition Russian Volunteer Corps claimed to have captured the village from the Russian government. Governor Gladkov admitted that it was not possible for Russian government units to enter the village due to shelling and that about 100 people remained in the village.
