= Bely Kolodez, Shebekinsky District, Belgorod Oblast =

Bely Kolodez Белый Колодезь
- Selo
- Location within Belgorod Oblast Location within Russia
- Coordinates: 50°37′N 37°18′E
- Country: Russia
- Region: Belgorod Oblast
- District: Shebekinsky District
- Time zone: UTC+3:00

Bely Kolodez (Russian: Белый Колодезь) is a rural locality (a selo) and the administrative center of Belokolodezyanskoye Rural Settlement, Shebekinsky District, Belgorod Oblast, Russia. The population was 420 as of 2010. There are 5 streets.

== Geography ==
Bely Kolodez is located 52 km northeast of Shebekino (the district's administrative centre) by road. Artelnoye is the nearest rural locality.
