= Shebekinsky =

Shebekinsky (masculine), Shebekinskaya (feminine), or Shebekinskoye (neuter) may refer to:

- Shebekinsky District, a district of Belgorod Oblast, Russia
- Shebekinsky (rural locality), a rural locality (a settlement) in Belgorod Oblast, Russia
