= Bely Kolodez (disambiguation) =

Bely Kolodez (Russian: Белый Колодезь), rural localities in Russia, may refer to:

Belgorod Oblast

- Bely Kolodez, Novooskolsky District, Belgorod Oblast, a khutor
- Bely Kolodez, Shebekinsky District, Belgorod Oblast, a selo
- Bely Kolodez, Veydelevsky District, Belgorod Oblast, a selo

Bryansk Oblast

- Bely Kolodez, Bryansk Oblast, a selo

Kursk Oblast

- Bely Kolodez, Dmitriyevsky District, Kursk Oblast, a settlement
- Bely Kolodez, Manturovsky District, Kursk Oblast, a village
- Bely Kolodez, Medvensky District, Kursk Oblast, a selo
- Bely Kolodez, Shchigrovsky District, Kursk Oblast, a settlement
- Bely Kolodez, Zolotukhinsky District, Kursk Oblast, a selo

Orjol Oblast

- Bely Kolodez Pervy, a village
- Bely Kolodez Vtoroy, a village

Rostov Oblast

- Bely Kolodez, Rostov Oblast, a khutor

Tula Oblast

- Bely Kolodez, Arsenyevsky District, Tula Oblast, a selo
- Bely Kolodez, Volovsky District, Tula Oblast, a settlement

Voronezh Oblast

- Bely Kolodez, Voronezh Oblast, a khutor
