= Krapivnoye, Shebekinsky District, Belgorod Oblast =

Krapivnoye Крапивное
- Selo
- Location within Belgorod Oblast Location within Russia
- Coordinates: 50°27′N 36°52′E
- Country: Russia
- Region: Belgorod Oblast
- District: Shebekinsky District
- Time zone: UTC+3:00

Krapivnoye (Russian: Крапивное) is a rural locality (a selo) in Shebekinsky District, Belgorod Oblast, Russia. The population was 684 as of 2010. There are 42 streets.

== Geography ==
Krapivnoye is located 7 km north of Shebekino (the district's administrative centre) by road. Shebekinsky is the nearest rural locality.
