= Nezhegol (river) =

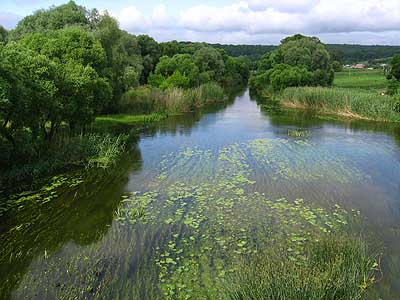
- At the mouth of Nezhegol
- Native name: Нежеголь (Russian)

Location
- Country: Russia

Physical characteristics
- Mouth: Donets
  - coordinates: 50°22′14″N 36°48′25″E
- Length: 75 km (47 mi)
- Basin size: 2,940 km (1,830 mi)

Basin features
- Progression: Donets→ Don→ Sea of Azov

Nezhegol (Russian: Нежеголь) is a river in Belgorod Oblast in Russia. It is a left tributary of the Seversky Donets. It is 75 kilometres (47 mi) long, with a drainage basin of 2,940 square kilometres (1,140 sq mi). The average discharge is 8.3 m^{3}/sek (3 kilometres (1.9 mi) from its mouth).

Five kilometres (3 mi) before its mouth in the Seversky Donets lies the town of Shebekino.
