= Shebekino =

Town in Belgorod Oblast, Russia

Shebekino Шебекино
- Town
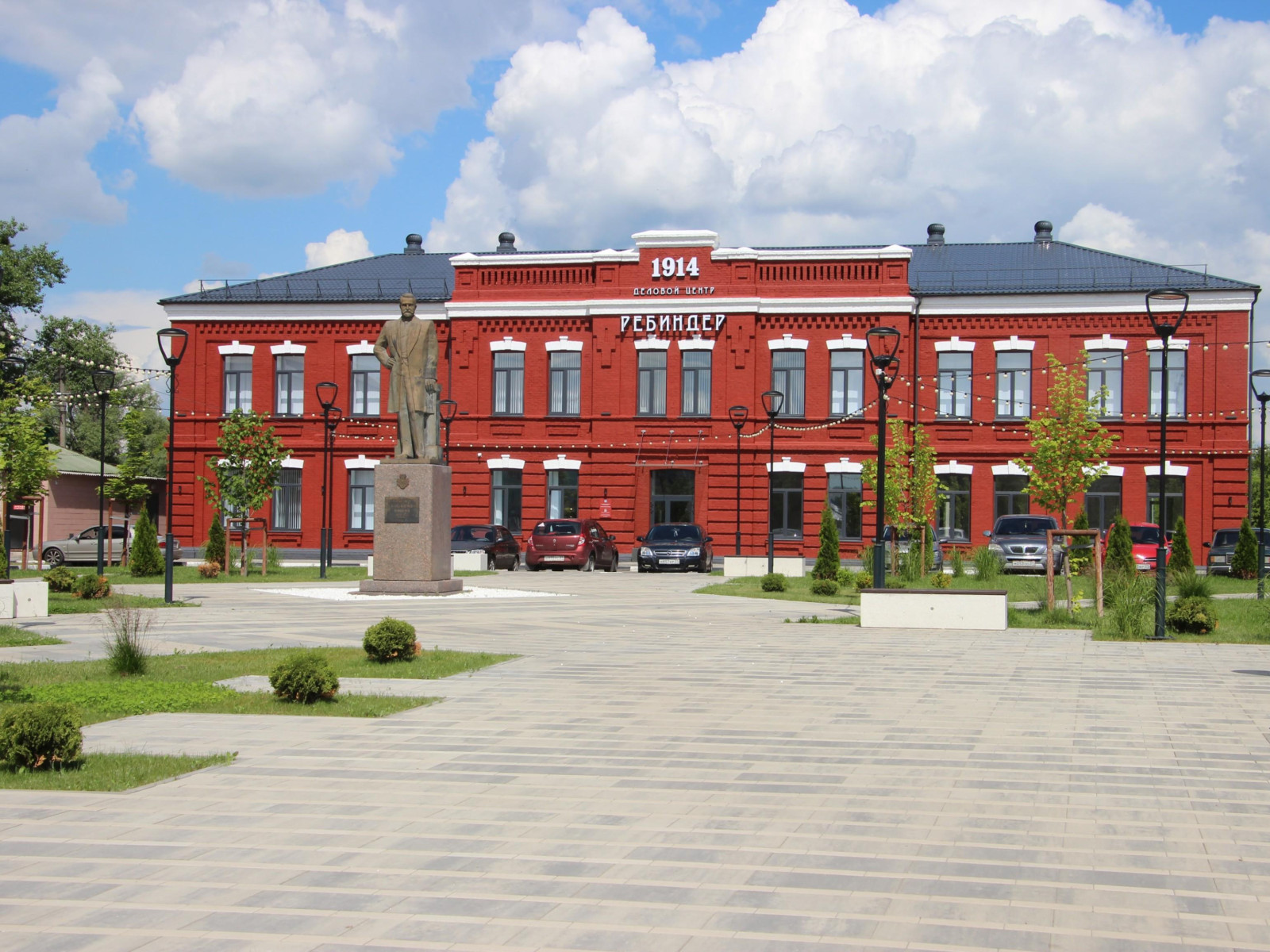

- Flag Coat of arms
- Interactive map of Shebekino
- Location of Shebekino Shebekino (European Russia) Shebekino (Russia)
- Coordinates: 50°25′N 36°54′E
- Country: Russia
- Federal subject: Belgorod Oblast
- First mentioned: 1713
- Town status since: 1938
- Elevation: 110 m (360 ft)

Population (2010 Census)
  - Total: 44,279
  - Estimate (1 January 2023): 38,925 (−12.1%)

Administrative status
  - Subordinated to: town of oblast significance of Shebekino
  - Capital of: town of oblast significance of Shebekino, Shebekinsky District

Municipal status
  - Municipal district: Shebekinsky Municipal District
  - Urban settlement: Shebekino Urban Settlement
  - Capital of: Shebekinsky Municipal District, Shebekino Urban Settlement
- Time zone: UTC+3 (MSK)
- Postal code: 309290
- OKTMO ID: 14750000001

Shebekino (Russian: Шебе́кино) is a town in Belgorod Oblast, Russia, located on the Nezhegol River, 30 kilometers (19 mi) southeast of Belgorod. Population: 39,680 (2021 census); 44,277 (2010 census); 45,119 (2002 census); 44,552 (1989 Soviet census). It is the administrative center, though not part of, Shebekinsky District.

In June 2023, during the Russian invasion of Ukraine, Shebekino was the site of ground raids by pro-Ukrainian militias, with residents describing it as "destroyed" after heavy shelling.

== Geography ==
Shebekino is located at the confluence of the Koren and Korocha rivers, 35 kilometres (22 mi) from the oblast center Belgorod. Additionally, the Nezhegol river flows through the town, dividing it into two parts. It is located a little over 4 miles (6.4 km) from the Russia–Ukraine border.

Within the framework of administrative divisions, Shebekino serves as the administrative center of Shebekinsky District, even though it is not a part of it. As an administrative division, it is incorporated separately as the town of oblast significance of Shebekino—an administrative unit with the status equal to that of the districts. As a municipal division, the town of oblast significance of Shebekino is incorporated within Shebekinsky Municipal District as Shebekino Urban Settlement.

== History ==
=== Early history ===
In 1654, near the site of modern Shebekino, the Nezhegolsk fortress was built, part of the Belgorod defensive line. Since then, the site of Shebekino began to be populated by workers, peasants, and Ukrainians.

Shebekino proper first appears in Russian maps in 1713. The name of the settlement originates from the original owner of the land, Ivan Dmitrievich Shibeko. Shibeko was a soldier who fought in the Battle of Poltava, who bought the land and settled there with his serfs. Shibeko died childless in 1716, leading to protracted ownership disputes over the land.

=== Industrial development ===
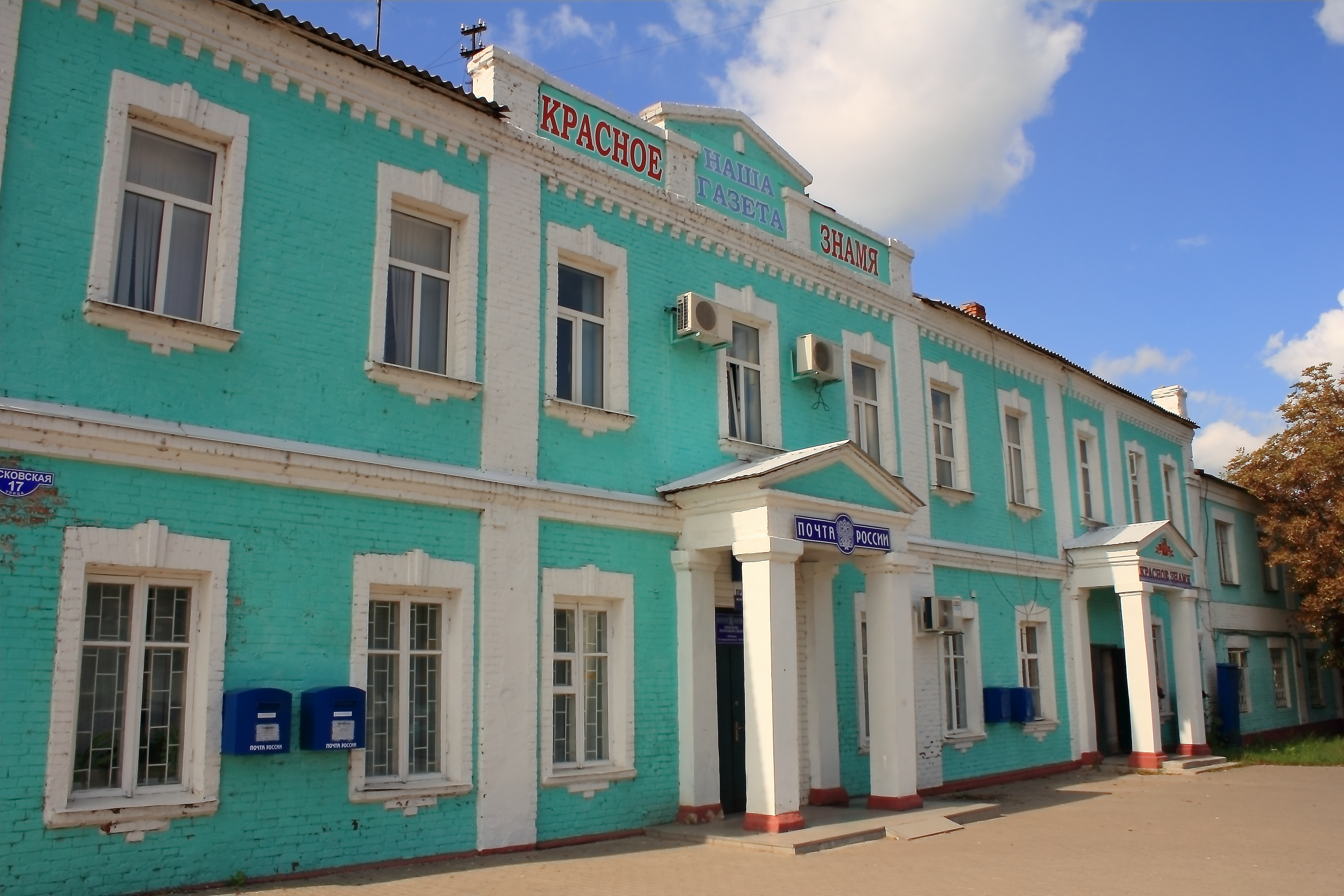
Old merchant house, now post office

In 1836, Shebekino was bought by military officer Alexei Rehbinder. Rehbinder built several factories in the area, including a sugar factory on the river Nezhegol, which specifically is credited with beginning the industrial development of Shebekino. In 1890, construction began on a railway line from Shebekino to Kupiansk. In 1905, Alexei Rehbinder's son Alexander Rehbinder built an electric power plant near the sugar factory, which provided the factory as well as residential houses with electricity.

In 1928, Shebekino became the center of the newly created Shebekinsky District. It received town/city status in 1938. During World War II, the town was located on the frontline between opposing forces and was heavily damaged. It was occupied by Nazi Germany between 14 June 1942 and 9 February 1943. By the end of the occupation, the industry of the town was reduced to ruins.

In the postwar period, Shebekino developed a chemical industry. On 6 January 1954, Shebekinsky District was transferred to the newly created Belgorod Oblast. By 1993, Shebekino had a population of 45,100 inhabitants.

=== Russian invasion of Ukraine ===
On June 1, 2023, during the Russian invasion of Ukraine, Shebekino was reportedly hit by shelling from Ukrainian territory. Shebekino was described by journalists as effectively becoming a "frontline city", with little-to-no help from Russian authorities. Residents of the town described it as "destroyed" by heavy shelling. Mass evacuations took place. The shelling was the prelude to a full ground raid into Russian territory by two pro-Ukrainian militias: the Russian Volunteer Corps (RVC) and the Freedom of Russia Legion (FRL).

According to the Institute for the Study of War, the FRL and RVC reached Shebekino and Novaya Tavolzhanka on 1 June. The ISW described the attacks as raids, defining them as "small scale assault operations involving swift entry into hostile territory to secure information, disrupt hostile forces, or destroy installations". Belgorod Oblast Governor Vyacheslav Gladkov said residents were being evacuated from the settlements and claimed that all "Ukrainian" forces had withdrawn from Belgorod Oblast by the end of the day.

On 4 June, the FRL posted a video online calling for Governor Gladkov to meet them "to discuss the current situation in the region and the future of Russia," in exchange for releasing two Russian soldiers they had captured. Gladkov said he would be willing to meet the group in Shebekino. The FRL leadership arrived at the checkpoint outside Shebekino at the agreed time, but Gladkov did not, claiming that the POWs had been executed. In response, the FRL said it would send the POWs to Kyiv.

As late as 17 June, there were still reports of anti-government forces sporadically operating in Belgorod Oblast, shelling pro-government positions. The number of evacuations of civilians from border regions was estimated at 6,500, with most of the civilians from Shebekino having left.

== Notable people ==
- David Kirakosyan, Armenian football player

== Sources ==
- Perkova, Margarita; Zaikina, Anastasiia (September 12, 2016). "Historical peculiarities of formation of small town of Shebekino structure". Architecture and Engineering. 1 (3). Belgorod State Technological University named after V. G. Shukhov, Kostyukov str. 46, Belgorod, 308012, Russia. doi:10.23968/2500-0055-2016-1-3-18-23.
- Белгородская областная Дума. Закон №248 от 15 декабря 2008 г. «Об административно-территориальном устройстве Белгородской области», в ред. Закона №213 от 4 июля 2013 г. «О внесении изменения в Закон Белгородской области "Об административно-территориальном устройстве Белгородской области"». Вступил в силу по истечении 10 дней со дня официального опубликования за исключением положений, для которых предусмотрены иные сроки вступления в силу. Опубликован: "Белгородские известия", №219-220, 19 декабря 2008 г. (Belgorod Oblast Duma. Law #248 of December 15, 2008 On the Administrative-Territorial Structure of Belgorod Oblast, as amended by the Law #213 of July 4, 2013 On Amending the Law of Belgorod Oblast "On the Administrative-Territorial Structure of Belgorod Oblast". Effective as of 10 days after the day of the official publication; except for the portions for which other effective dates are specified.).
- Белгородская областная Дума. Закон №159 от 20 декабря 2004 г. «Об установлении границ муниципальных образований и наделении их статусом городского, сельского поселения, городского округа, муниципального района», в ред. Закона №244 от 4 декабря 2013 г. «О внесении изменения в статью 12 Закона Белгородской области "Об установлении границ муниципальных образований и наделении их статусом городского, сельского поселения, городского округа, муниципального района"». Вступил в силу по истечении 10 дней со дня официального опубликования. Опубликован: "Белгородские известия", №218–220, 24 декабря 2004 г. (Belgorod Oblast Duma. Law #159 of December 20, 2004 On Establishing the Borders of the Municipal Formations and on Granting Them a Status of Urban, Rural Settlement, Urban Okrug, Municipal District, as amended by the Law #244 of December 4, 2013 On Amending Article 12 of the Law of Belgorod Oblast "On Establishing the Borders of the Municipal Formations and on Granting Them a Status of Urban, Rural Settlement, Urban Okrug, Municipal District". Effective as of the day which is 10 days after the official publication.).
