= Shebekinsky District =

Shebekinsky District Шебекинский район (Russian)
- District
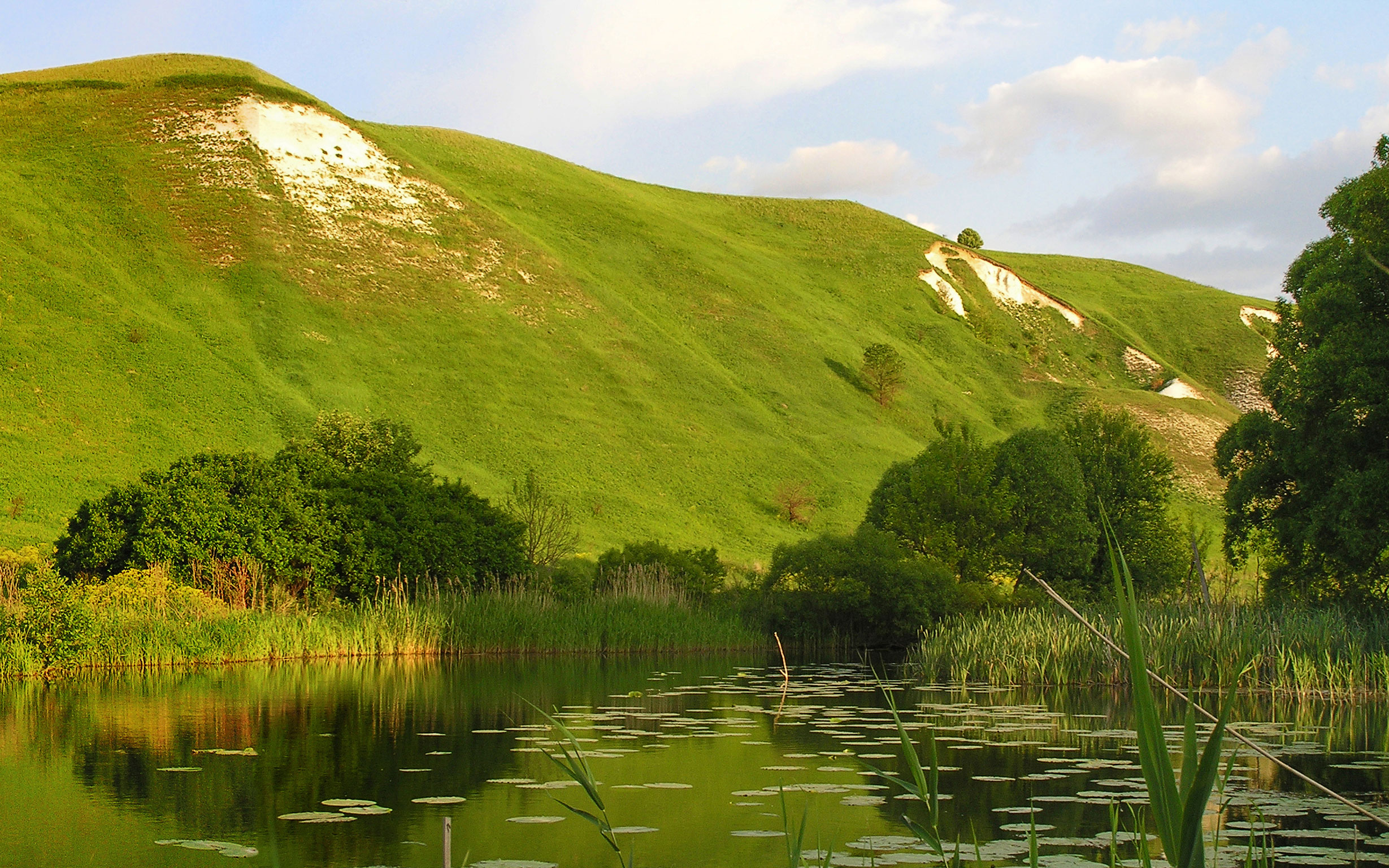
- The Koren River near the selo of Krapivnoye in Shebekinsky District

- Flag Coat of arms
- Location of Shebekinsky District in Belgorod Oblast
- Coordinates: 50°25′N 36°54′E
- Country: Russia
- Federal subject: Belgorod Oblast
- Established: 30 July 1928
- Administrative center: Shebekino

Area
  - Total: 1,865.9 km^{2} (720.4 sq mi)

Population (2010 Census)
  - Total: 47,889
  - Density: 25.665/km^{2} (66.473/sq mi)
  - Urban: 12.2%
  - Rural: 87.8%

Administrative structure
  - Inhabited localities: 1 urban-type settlements, 101 rural localities

Municipal structure
  - Municipally incorporated as: Shebekinsky Municipal District
  - Municipal divisions: 1 urban settlements, 14 rural settlements
- Website: http://admsheb.ru/

Shebekinsky District (Russian: Шебе́кинский райо́н) is an administrative district (raion), one of the twenty-one in Belgorod Oblast, Russia. As a municipal division, it is incorporated as Shebekinsky Municipal District. It is located in the south of the oblast. The area of the district is 1,865.9 square kilometers (720.4 sq mi). Its administrative center is the town of Shebekino (which is not administratively a part of the district). Population: 47,889 (2010 census); 47,345 (2002 Census); 44,668 (1989 Soviet census).

== History ==
Shebekinsky District was created in 1928. On 6 January 1954, Shebekinsky District was transferred to the newly created Belgorod Oblast.

== Administrative and municipal status ==
Within the framework of administrative divisions, Shebekinsky District is one of the twenty-one in the oblast. The town of Shebekino serves as its administrative center, despite being incorporated separately as a town of oblast significance—an administrative unit with the status equal to that of the districts.

As a municipal division, the district is incorporated as Shebekinsky Municipal District, with the town of oblast significance of Shebekino being incorporated within it as Shebekino Urban Settlement.
