= Belgorod Oblast =

First-level administrative division of Russia

Belgorod Oblast Белгородская область (Russian)
- Oblast
- Flag Coat of arms

- Coordinates: 50°46′N 37°27′E
- Country: Russia
- Federal district: Central
- Economic region: Central Black Earth
- Established: 6 January 1954
- Administrative center: Belgorod

Government
  - Body: Oblast Duma
  - Governor: Alexander Shuvaev (acting)

Area
  - Total: 27,134 km^{2} (10,476 sq mi)
  - Rank: 67th

Population (2021 census)
  - Total: 1,540,486
  - Estimate (2018): 1,549,876
  - Rank: 30th
  - Density: 56.773/km^{2} (147.04/sq mi)
  - Urban: 65.2%
  - Rural: 34.8%

GDP (nominal, 2024)
  - Total: ₽1.52 trillion (US$17.78 billion)
  - Per capita: ₽1.02 million (US$11,919.53)
- Time zone: UTC+3 (MSK)
- ISO 3166 code: RU-BEL
- License plates: 31
- OKTMO ID: 14000000
- Official languages: Russian
- Website: www.belregion.ru

Belgorod Oblast (Note: Russian: Белгоро́дская о́бласть, romanized: Belgorodskaya oblastʹ) is a federal subject (an oblast) of Russia. Its administrative center is the city of Belgorod. As of 2021, the population is 1,540,486.

== History ==
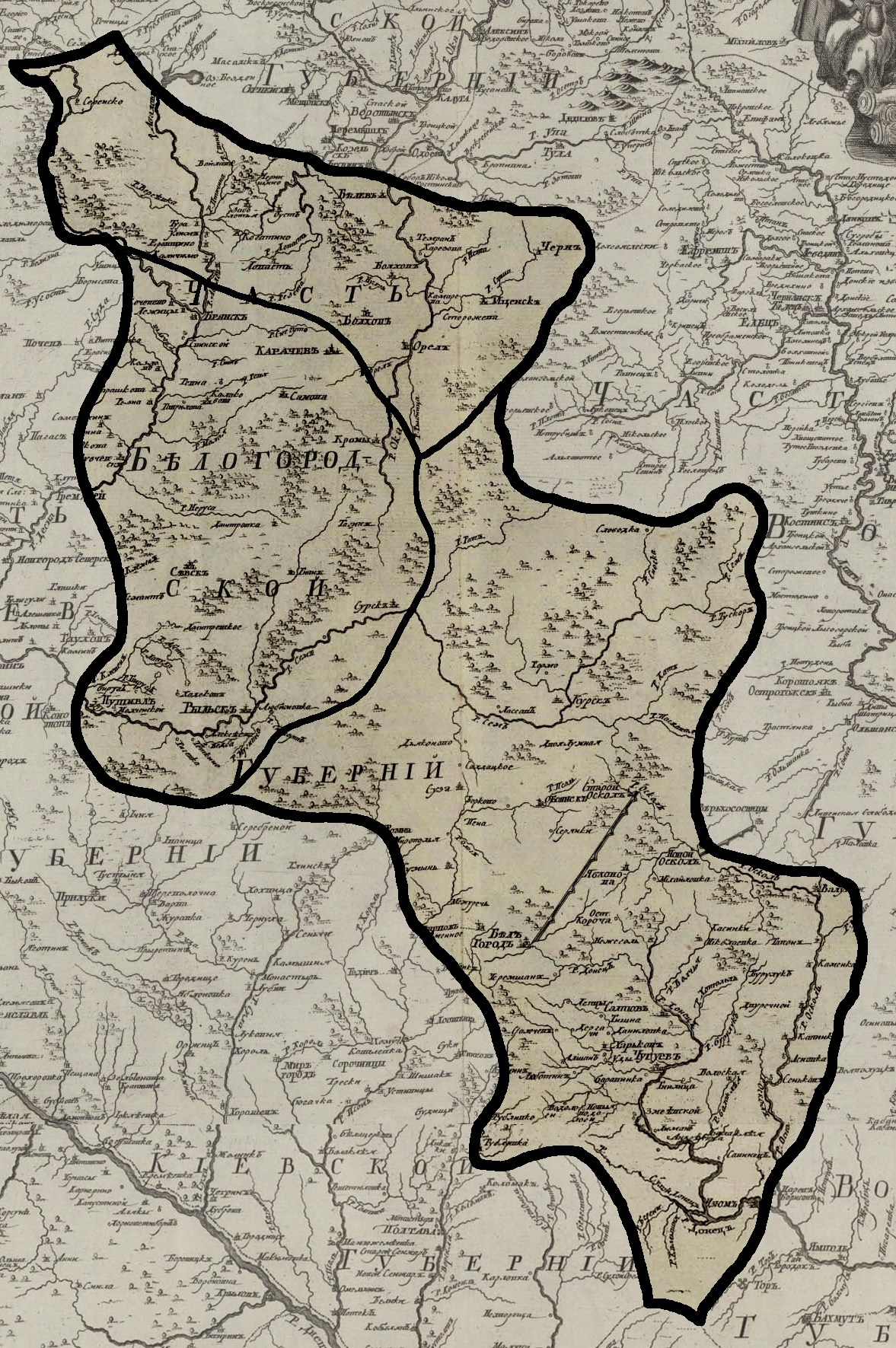
Map of Belgorod Governorate (1745)

During the Princely era of Kievan Rus', the region was part of the Principality of Chernigov. The area was devastated by Mongol-Tatar raids and came under the control of the Grand Duchy of Lithuania in the 14th and 15th centuries. Since 1500 it was part of the Grand Duchy of Moscow.

At the turn of the 17th century, a solid line of military fortifications was built in the area, stretching for almost 800 kilometers (500 mi). Zaporozhian Cossacks, who moved here because of the nobility and the tax burden, were in charge of the line defenses. Even more Cossacks moved to the area during the Khmelnytsky Uprising (1648–1657) and the internecine wars in the Cossack Hetmanate (1659–1679). Belgorod became the military and administrative center, after originating as an outpost on the southern borders of Russia.

Following the Battle of Poltava, Peter I granted to soldiers of Greater Belgorod the regiment flag.

From 1708 to 1727, the territory of the modern Belgorod Oblast was part of the Kiev and Azov governorates. In 1727, Belgorod Governorate was established from parts of Kiev Governorate. The governorate lasted until 1779. This territory was much greater than that of today, and the governorate incorporated territories modern Kursk, Oryol, and parts of Bryansk and Kharkiv oblasts. The coat of arms of the then-Governorate is still used by the modern Belgorod Oblast.

In 1775–1779, the territory of Belgorod Governorate was abolished and divided between the newly formed governorates and vice-royalties. The city of Belgorod and the area around it became a part of Kursk Vice-Royalty, while the southeastern uyezds became a part of Voronezh Governorate.

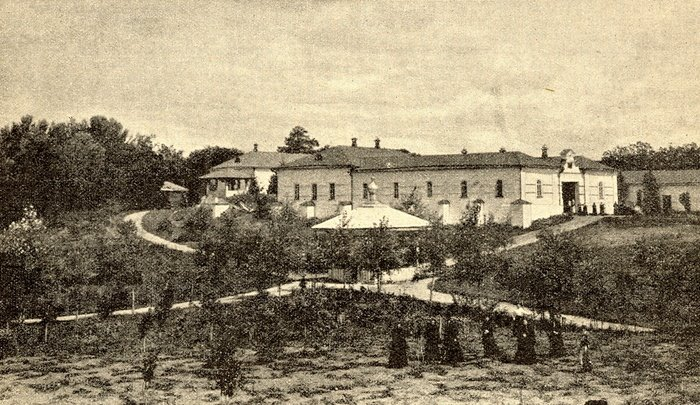
Nikolo-Tikhvinsky Monastery in 1900

During the 19th century and up until 1928 the territory of modern Belgorod Oblast remained part of the Kursk and Voronezh governorates. After the signing of the Treaty of Brest-Litovsk in April 1918, in January 1919 the territory was incorporated into the Ukrainian State under hetman Pavlo Skoropadskyi.

The current administrative-territorial boundaries of Belgorod Oblast were formed by the Decree of the Presidium of the Supreme Soviet of the USSR on 6 January 1954. The oblast was formed from several districts of Kursk and Voronezh Oblasts.

For the courage and resilience shown by the people of Belgorod Oblast in defense of the Motherland during the Great Patriotic War, and for progress in reconstruction and development of national economy. On 4 January 1967, Belgorod Oblast was awarded the Order of Lenin, and in 1980 the city of Belgorod was awarded the Order of the Patriotic War, first degree.

In 2007, the city of Belgorod received the honorary title of the City of Military Glory.

In May 2023, the governor of the region claimed that a Ukrainian "sabotage group" entered the region. Ukrainian media identified the alleged groups as the Freedom of Russia Legion and Russian Volunteer Corps. The units claimed they had "completely liberated" the settlement of Kozinka in the oblast, and that they had entered Graivoron.

Government officials declared a state of emergency in the Belgorod region on 14 August 2024 during the Russo-Ukrainian War following the incursion of Ukrainian military forces into the neighboring Kursk region and many attacks on airbases within Belgorod itself.

== Geography ==
Belgorod Oblast
- Interactive map of Belgorod Oblast

Belgorod Oblast is part of the Central Black Earth economic region and the Central Federal District. It borders with Luhansk, Kharkiv, and Sumy Oblasts of Ukraine in the south and west, Kursk Oblast in the north and northwest, and Voronezh Oblast in the east. The total length of its borders is about 1,150 kilometers (710 mi), of which 540 kilometers (340 mi) are on the border with Ukraine.

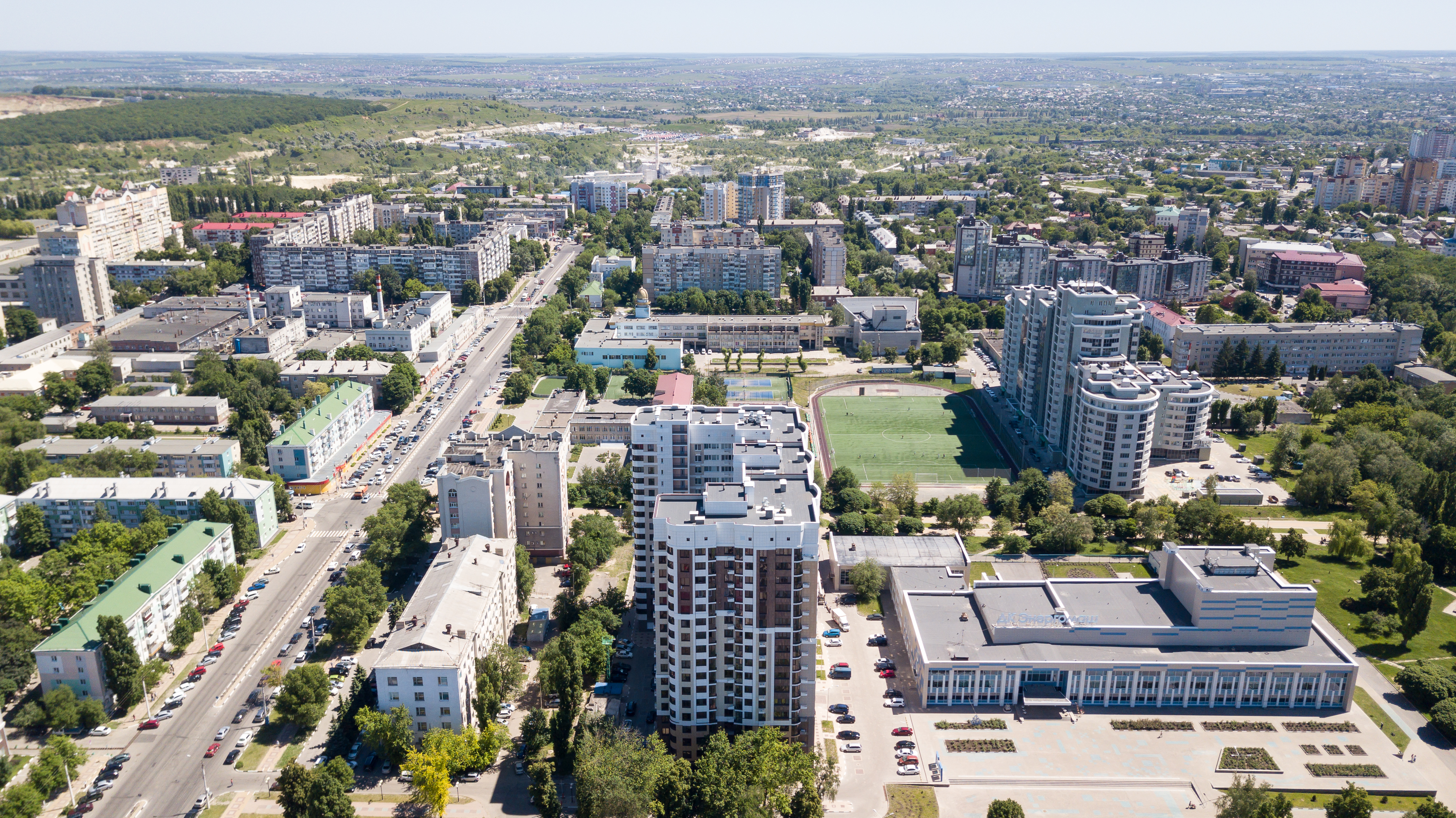
View of Belgorod and its surroundings

The area of the oblast is 27,100 square kilometers (10,500 sq mi); the oblast stretches for about 190 kilometers (120 mi) from north to south and for about 270 kilometers (170 mi) from east to west. The oblast is located in the southwestern and southern slopes of the Central Russian Upland in the Dnieper and Don River basins, in the steppe zone of elevated hilly plain with an average height of 200 meters (660 ft) above the sea level. The highest point is 277 meters (909 ft) above sea level, in Prokhorovsky District. The lowest point is located at the bottom of the Oskol and Seversky Donets River valleys.

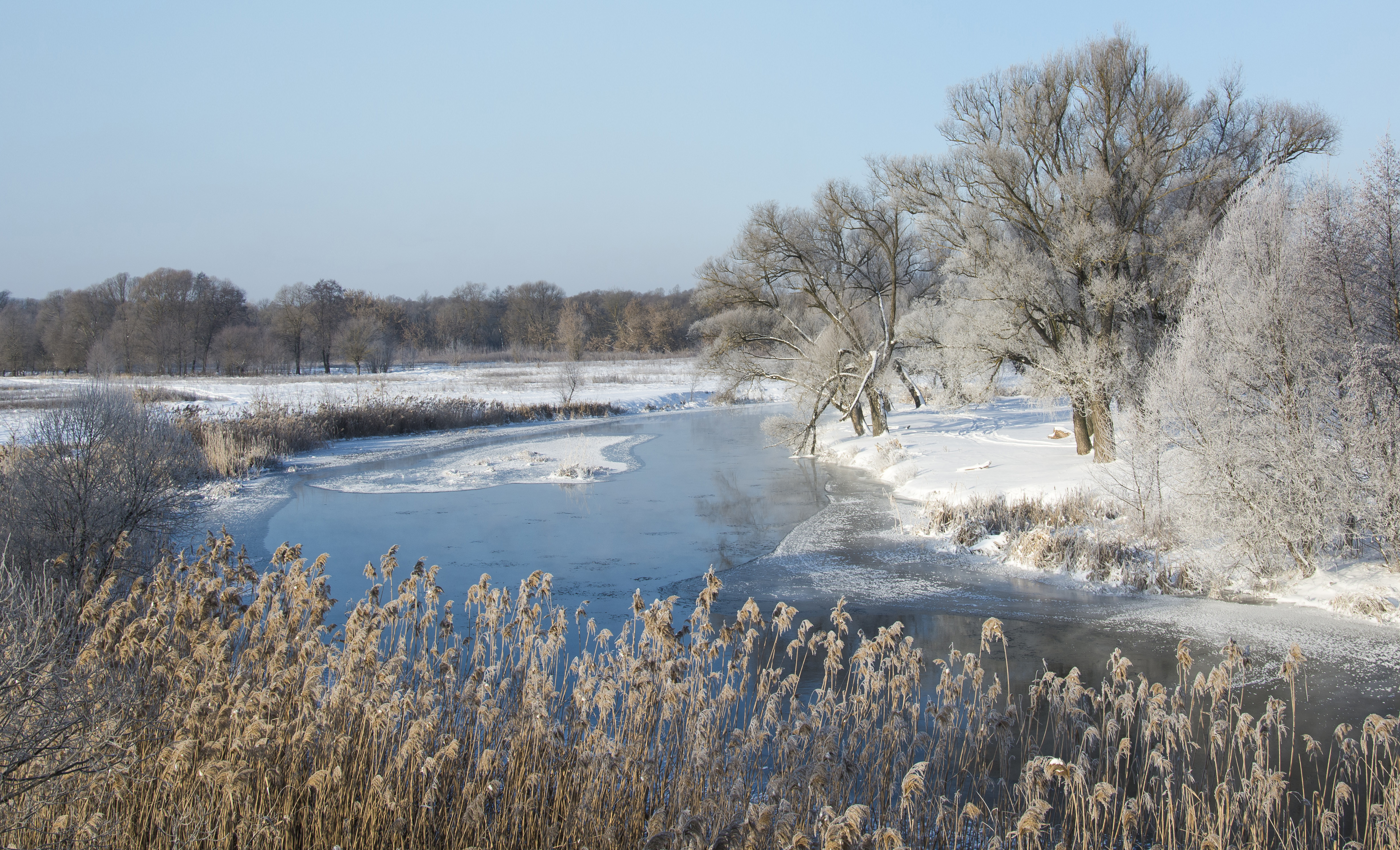
Nezhegol River

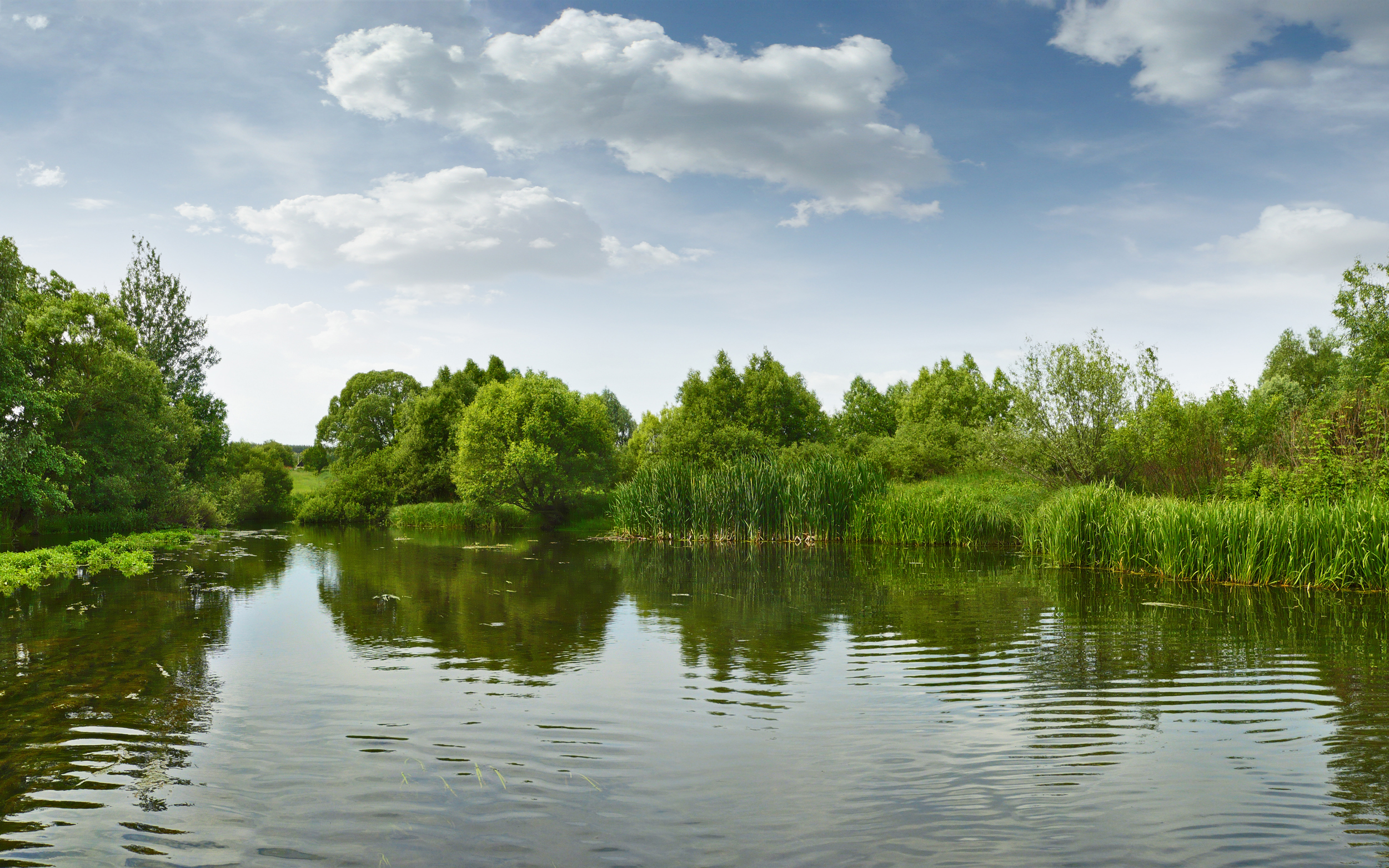
Koren River

Rivers, lakes, and marshes occupy about 1% of the oblast. There are more than 480 small rivers and streams. The largest of them are in the northwest—the Seversky Donets, Vorskla, Vorsklitsa, Psyol, and in the eastern regions—the Oskol, Tikhaya Sosna, Chyornaya Kalitva, Valuy. The total length of the river network is roughly 5,000 kilometers (3,100 mi), and in addition, there are 1,100 ponds and four artificial reservoirs.

=== Climate ===
The climate of Belgorod Oblast is temperate continental with a relatively mild winter with some snowfall and long summers. Average annual air temperature varies from +5.4 °C (41.7 °F) to +6.7 °C (44.1 °F), being warmer on average in the southeast than the north. The coldest month is January and the frost-free period is 155–160 days, with an average of 1800 hours of sunshine. Rainfall is uneven by year and season, with an average of 540–550 mm although rainfall can dramatically differ between the western and northern areas and the warmer, drier eastern and southeast where some years lows of around 400 millimeters (16 in) have been recorded.

=== Natural resources ===
Over 40% of known iron ore reserves of Russia are concentrated in the oblast. Deposits are confined to the Kursk Magnetic Anomaly area. Among them are Korobkovsky, Lebedinskoye, Stoylenskoye, and prospective Prioskolskoye iron ore deposits in Stary Oskol District, Bolshetroitskoye in Shebekinsky District, as well as Yakovlevskoye and Pogremetskoye fields.

Identified and explored in varying degrees are the large deposits of bauxites, apatites, underground mineral waters, and numerous deposits of construction materials such as chalk, sand, clay, and more. There are also known occurrences of gold, graphite, and other rare metals. Geographical features make the oblast likely to have deposits of platinum, hydrocarbons, and other minerals.

=== Biodiversity ===
The fauna is predominantly of the meadow-steppe variety and comprises, by various estimates, from ten to fifteen thousand species. About 10% of the animal species are in need of special protection. Fifty species are included in the IUCN Red List. There are about 279 species of birds, including 152 that breed in the oblast. The richest bird populations include sparrows (111 species); waders (45 species); geese (up to 30 species); day predators (21 species). The richest bird populations include sparrows (111 species); waders (45 species); geese (up to 30 species); day predators (21 species). The numbers of game animal species are as follows: moose: 387; deer: 501; roe deer: 4474; boar: 2574; hare: 18361; fox: 3856; marten: 2025; polecat: 1120; wolf: 36. The annual number of game animals remains stable.

The vegetation reflects the features of the northern forest-steppe, characterized by the alternation of forests with the meadow steppes. It is chiefly represented by two types of vegetation—the zonal and extrazonal. In all, there are 1,284 flora species. Woodlands cover 9.8% of the total area, of which over 800 hectares are classified as protected areas because their rare species of plants and habitats of animals are on the IUCN red list.

== Culture ==
The Belgorod region played a significant role in the evolution of Russian culture. It was inhabited by different tribes besides East Slavs and was one of the earliest Rus' principalities. Belgorod region played an important role in the Russian wedding tradition of the Rushnyk. Belgorod is also famous for its wood carving.

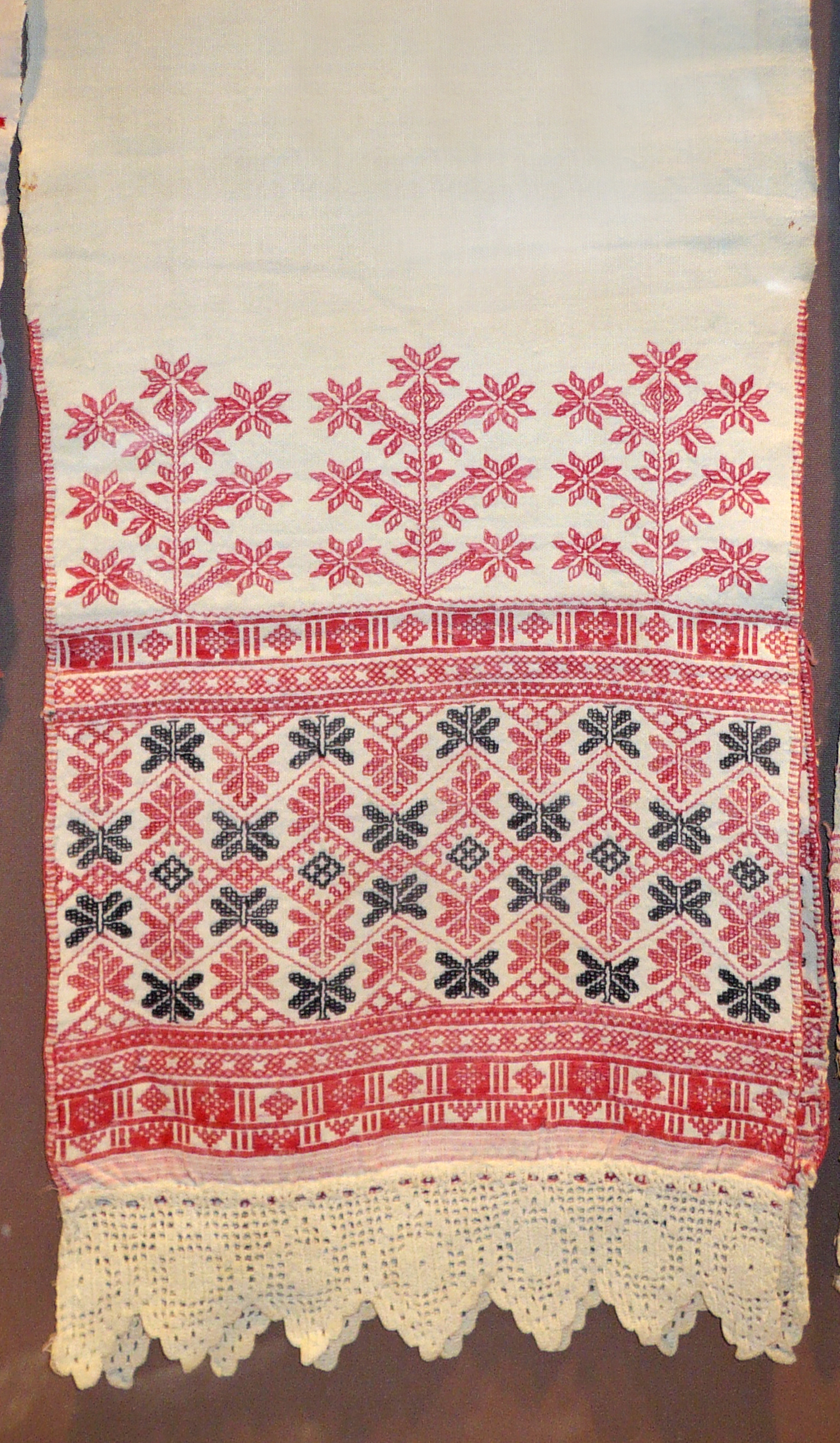
Old Russian Rushnyk in Belgorod

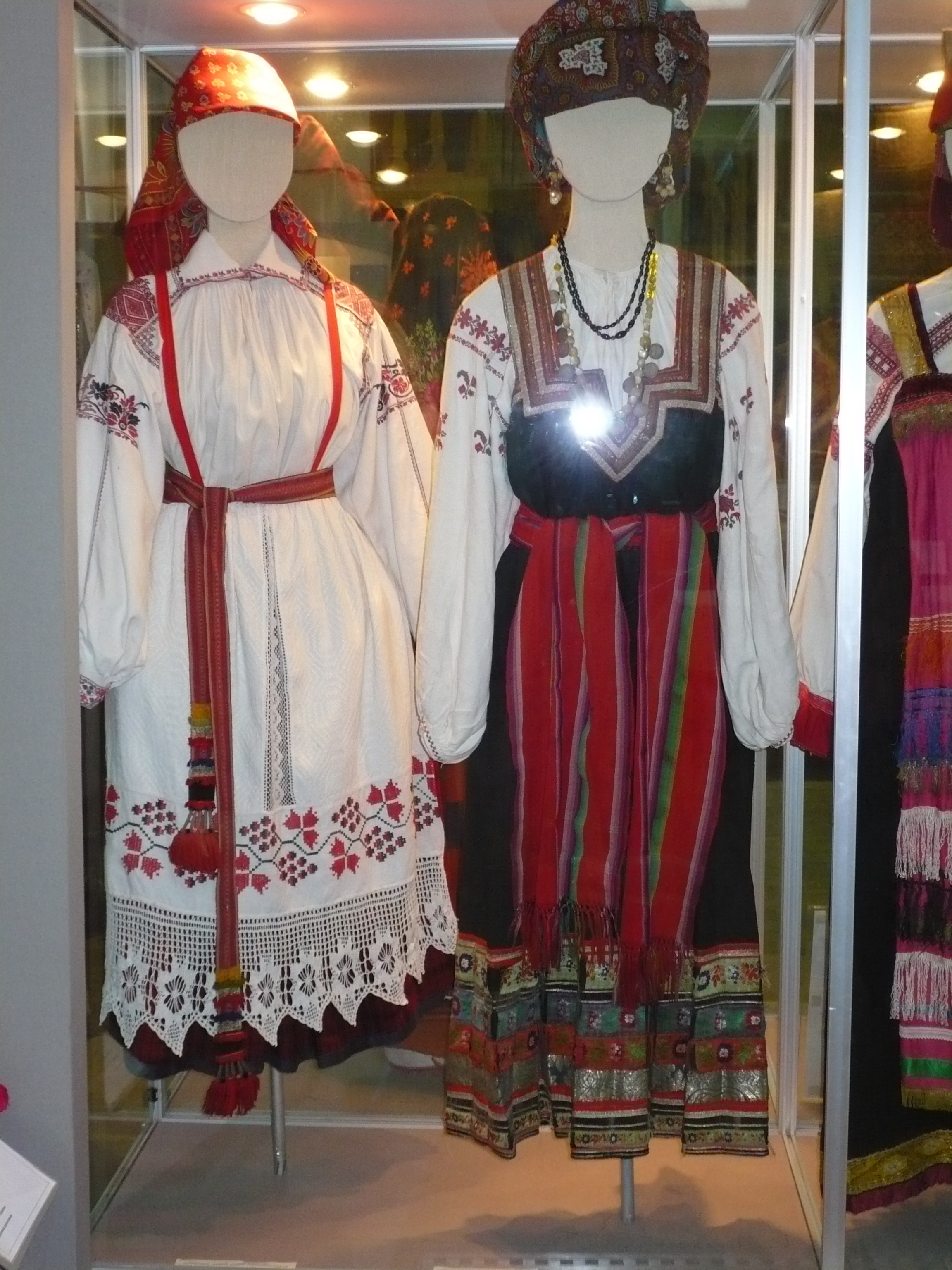
Traditional folk costumes of Belgorod

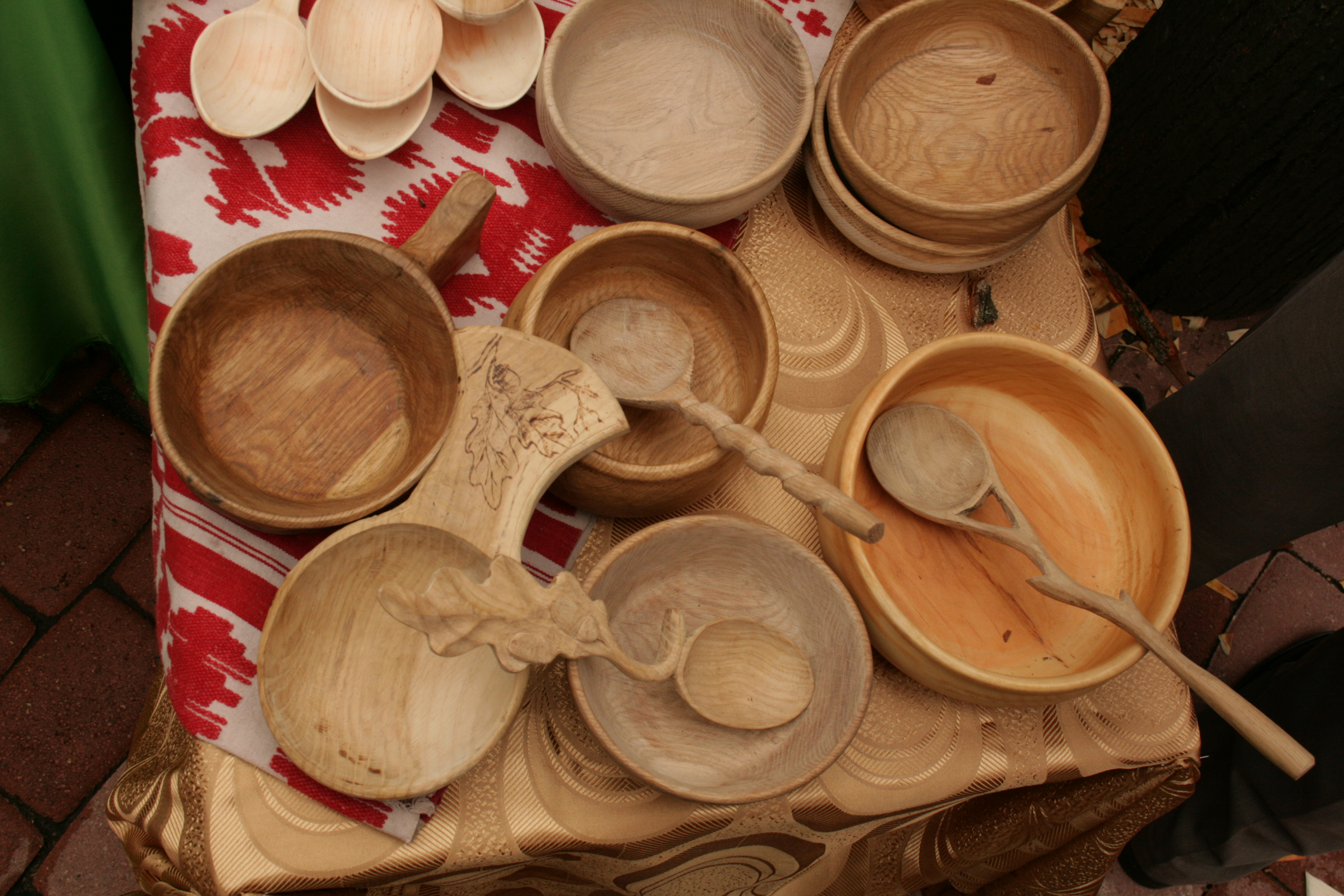
Wood carvings of Belgorod

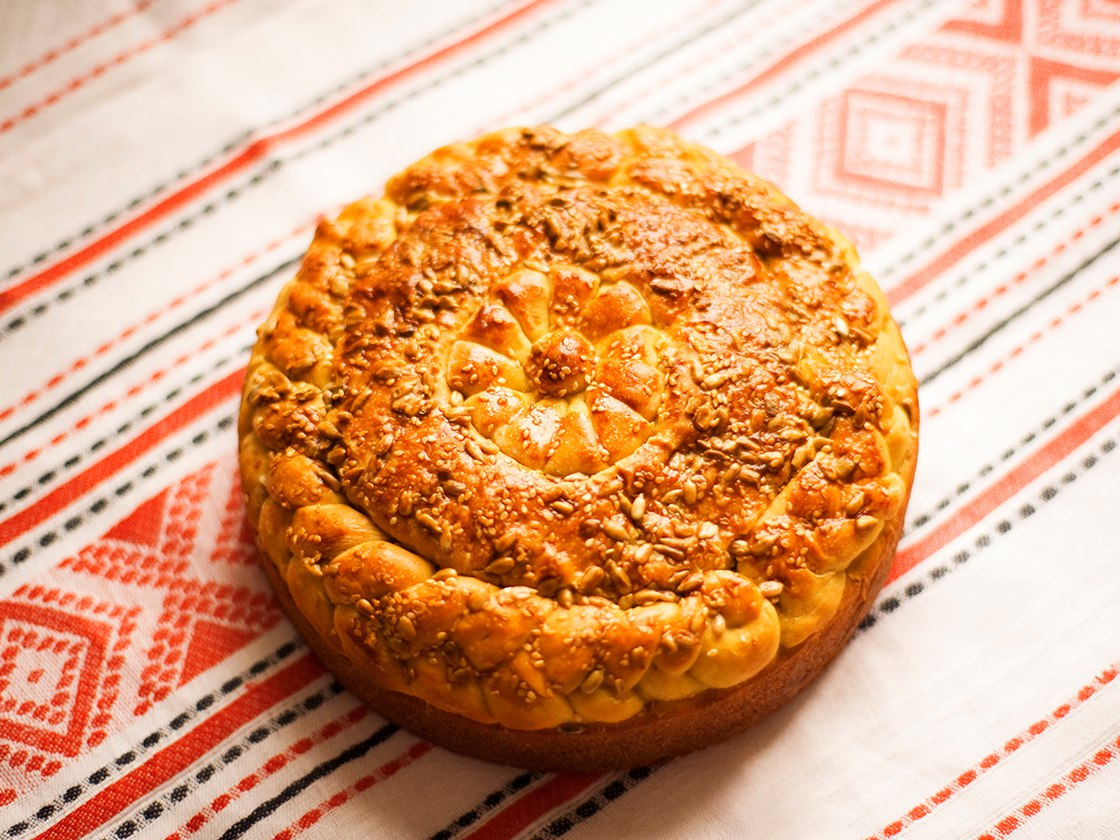
Belgorod bread. Belgorod region was one of the Old Russian regions from which the Bread and Salt tradition spread

== Politics ==
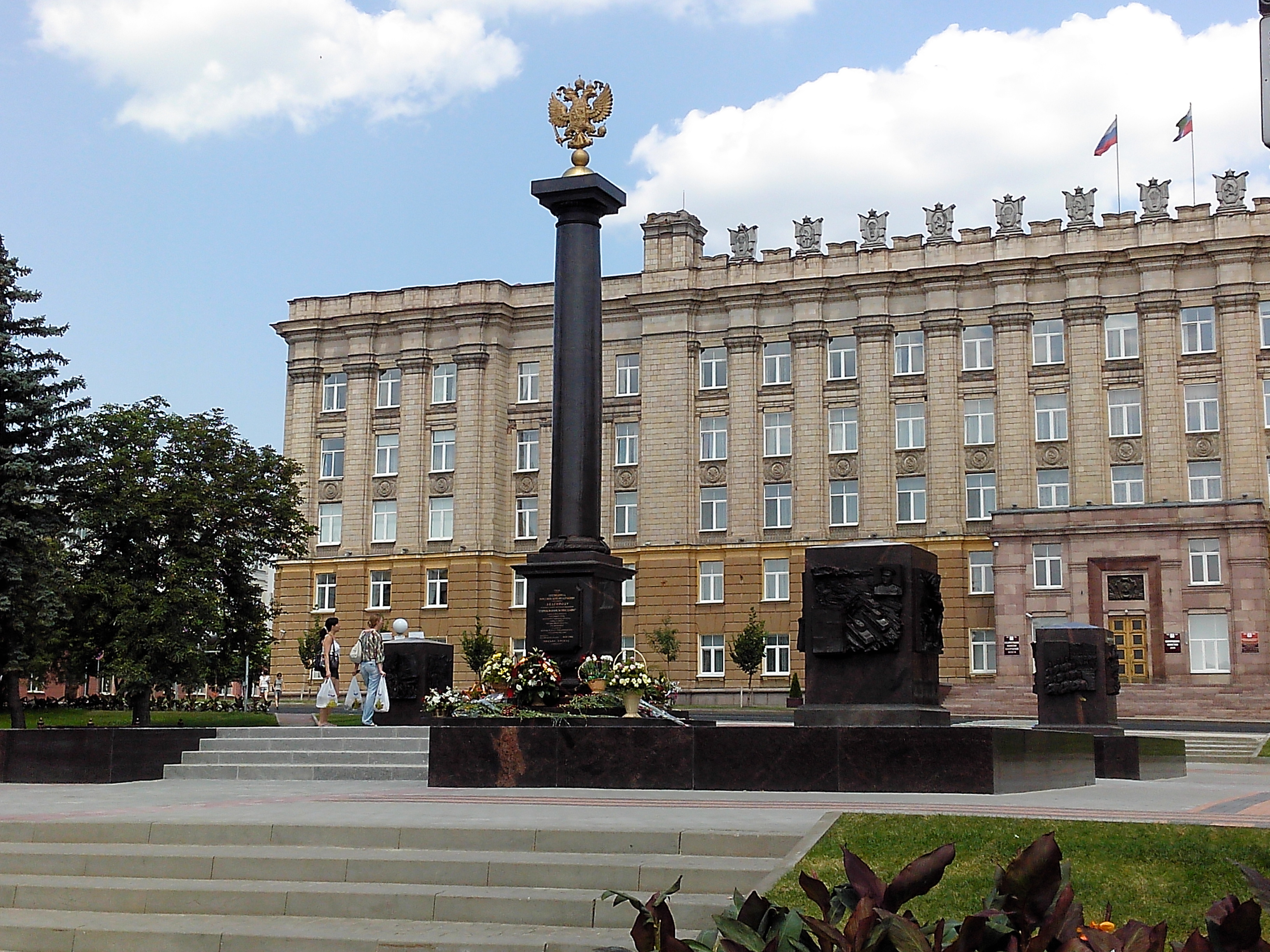
Oblast Administration building in Belgorod

During the Soviet period, the high authority in the oblast was shared between three persons: The first secretary of the Belgorod CPSU Committee (who in reality had the biggest authority), the chairman of the oblast Soviet (legislative power), and the Chairman of the oblast Executive Committee (executive power). Since 1991, when the CPSU lost power, the head of the Oblast administration, and eventually the governor was appointed/elected alongside elected regional parliament.

The Charter of Belgorod Oblast is the fundamental law of the region. The Legislative Assembly of Belgorod Oblast is the province's standing legislative (representative) body. The Legislative Assembly exercises its authority by passing laws, resolutions, and other legal acts and by supervising the implementation and observance of the laws and other legal acts passed by it. The highest executive body is the Oblast Government, which includes territorial executive bodies such as district administrations, committees, and commissions that facilitate development and run the day to day matters of the province. The Oblast administration supports the activities of the Governor who is the highest official and acts as guarantor of the observance of the oblast Charter in accordance with the Constitution of Russia.

The governor of Belgorod Oblast, Yevgeny Savchenko, was first appointed to this position in 1993 and subsequently re-elected in 1995, 1999, 2003, 2012 and 2017. In the 1999 election, his rival was Vladimir Zhirinovsky. Savchenko holds the title of longest-serving governor in post-Soviet Russia, being in office for 27 years. Since November 2020, Vyacheslav Gladkov is the governor of Belgorod Oblast.

On 13 September 2020, elections to the 7th Belgorod Oblast Duma were conducted. The United Russia Party has won 44 out of 50 seats, 4 seats were won by the Communist Party, 1 by the LDPR, and 1 by the Russian Party of Pensioners for Social Justice.

== Demographics ==
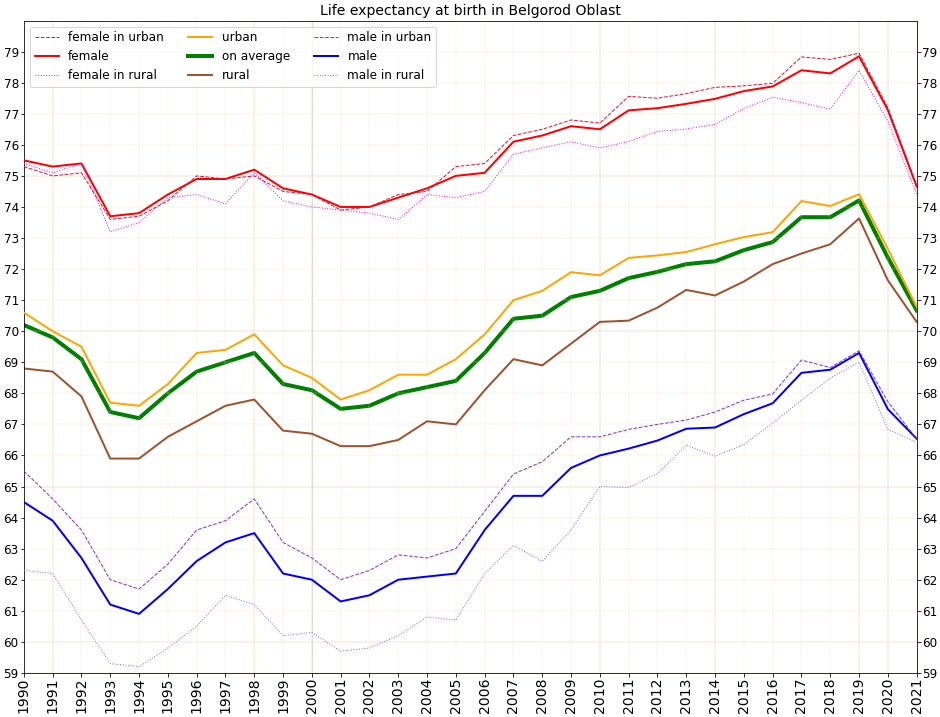
Life expectancy at birth in Belgorod Oblast

In terms of area, the oblast is in the 67th place among the federal subjects of Russia; while in terms of population it is 30th (as of the results of the 2021 Census, down two places compared to the 2010 Census results. According to the results of the 2021 Census, the population of the oblast was 1,540,486, with the urban population of 65.2% and the rural population of 34.8%. This is up from 1,532,526 recorded in the 2010 Census, and 1,380,723 recorded in the 1989 Census.

Population density in 2008 was 56.1 persons per 1 km^{2}. The average age is 38.5 years—35.6 for men and 41 for women; 46% of the population are economically active.

As in other regions of the European part of Russia, since the dissolution of the Soviet Union there has been a natural population decrease (about -5 per 1,000 of the population). In recent years, there has been some reversion of this decline as a result of growth of fertility and mortality. Nevertheless, despite the negative trend of growth, the population of the area has remained relatively stable because of immigration. Belgorod, in Soviet times, attracted retirement workers from the Far North and Ukraine. This trend has increased since 2005 and now cancels out the natural decline in population. Worker migrants also arrive in Belgorod from Uzbekistan; however, Muslim migrants face discrimination on a daily basis, and choose to leave.

=== Settlements ===
Largest cities or towns in Belgorod Oblast 2021 Russian Census
Rank		Administrative Division	Pop.
1	Belgorod	City of oblast significance of Belgorod	339,978
2	Stary Oskol	City of oblast significance of Stary Oskol	221,676
3	Gubkin	City of oblast significance of Gubkin	85,225
4	Shebekino	City of oblast significance of Shebekino	39,680
5	Alexeyevka	City of oblast significance of Alexeyevka	36,578
6	Valuyki	City of oblast significance of Valuyki	33,032
7	Stroitel	Yakovlevsky District	23,780
8	Novy Oskol	Novooskolsky District	18,359
9	Chernyanka	Chernyansky District	14,896
10	Borisovka	Borisovsky District	12,553

=== Population ===
Historical population
Year	Pop.	±%
1926	896,061	—
1959	1,226,328	+36.9%
1970	1,261,140	+2.8%
1979	1,304,675	+3.5%
1989	1,380,723	+5.8%
2002	1,511,620	+9.5%
2010	1,532,526	+1.4%
2021	1,540,486	+0.5%
2025	1,481,098	−3.9%
Source: Census data, estimate

Population: 1,540,486 (2021 census); 1,532,526 (2010 census); 1,511,620 (2002 census); 1,380,723 (1989 Soviet census).

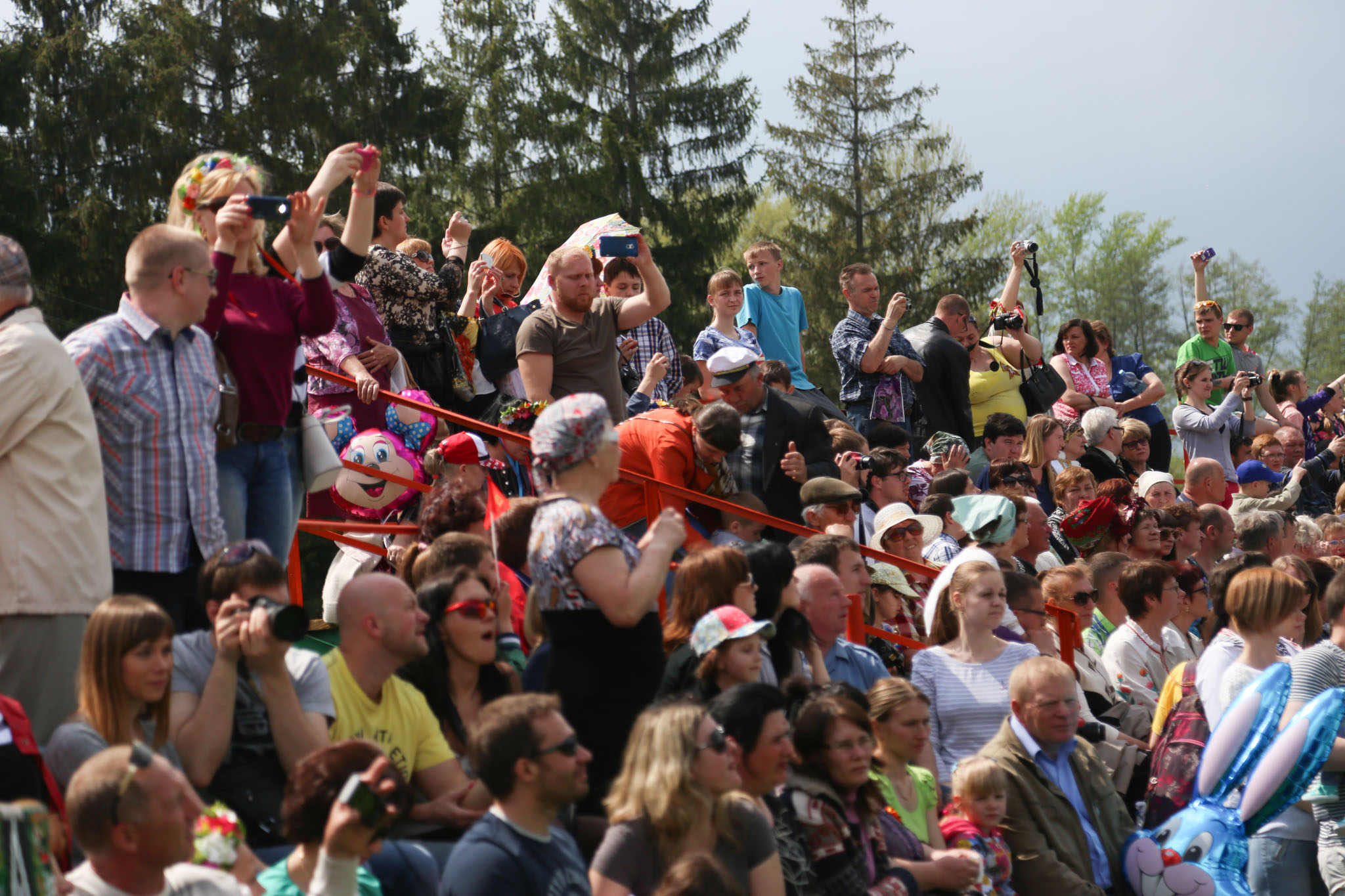
Spectators at a khorovod festival in Grayvoron, Belgorod Oblast

=== Ethnic composition ===
Ethnicity	2010		2021	
Ethnicity	Number	%	Number	%
Russians	1,404,653	94.4%	1,234,338	95.3%
Ukrainians	41,914	2.8%	15,481	1.2%
Armenian	7,588	0.5%	4,931	0.4%
Turks	4,665	0.3%	3,818	0.3%
Azeri	4,621	0.3%	3,471	0.3%
Others	25,073	1.7%	33,349	2.6%
Ethnicity not stated	44,012	–	245,098	–

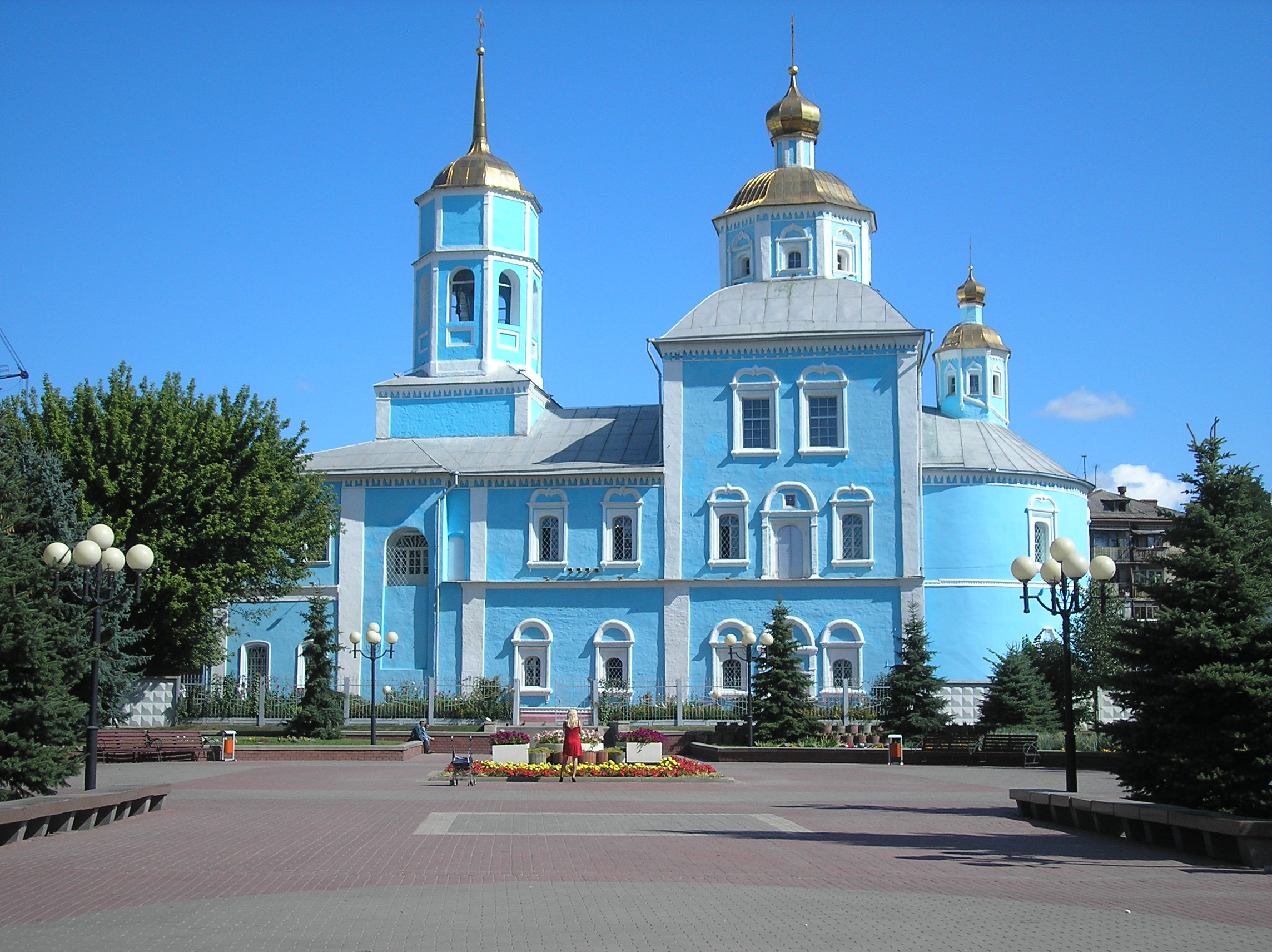
Smolensky church in Belgorod

Vital statistics for 2024:

- Births: 9,179 (6.1 per 1,000)
- Deaths: 20,937 (14.0 per 1,000)

Total fertility rate (2024):
1.07 children per woman

Life expectancy (2021):
Total — 70.67 years (male — 66.54, female — 74.66)

=== Religion ===
Religion in Belgorod Oblast as of 2012 (Sreda Arena Atlas)
Russian Orthodoxy	50.5%
Other Orthodox	1.7%
Roman Catholic	0.7%
Other Christians	8.6%
Islam	0.6%
Spiritual but not religious	22.2%
Atheism and irreligion	10.5%
Other and undeclared	5.2%

According to a 2012 survey 50.5% of the population of Belgorod Oblast adheres to the Russian Orthodox Church, 8.1% are nondenominational Christians (excluding Protestant churches), 1.7% are Orthodox Christians who don't belong to the Russian Orthodox Church. In addition, 22.2% of the population declares to be spiritual but not religious, 10.5% is atheist or irreligious, and 7% follows other religions or did not give an answer to the question.

== Administrative divisions ==
Belgorod Oblast is administratively divided into twenty-one districts (raions), which are further divided into 335 rural okrugs. There are ten cities/towns in the oblast, as well as twenty urban-type settlements and 1,592 rural-type settlements.

== Economy ==
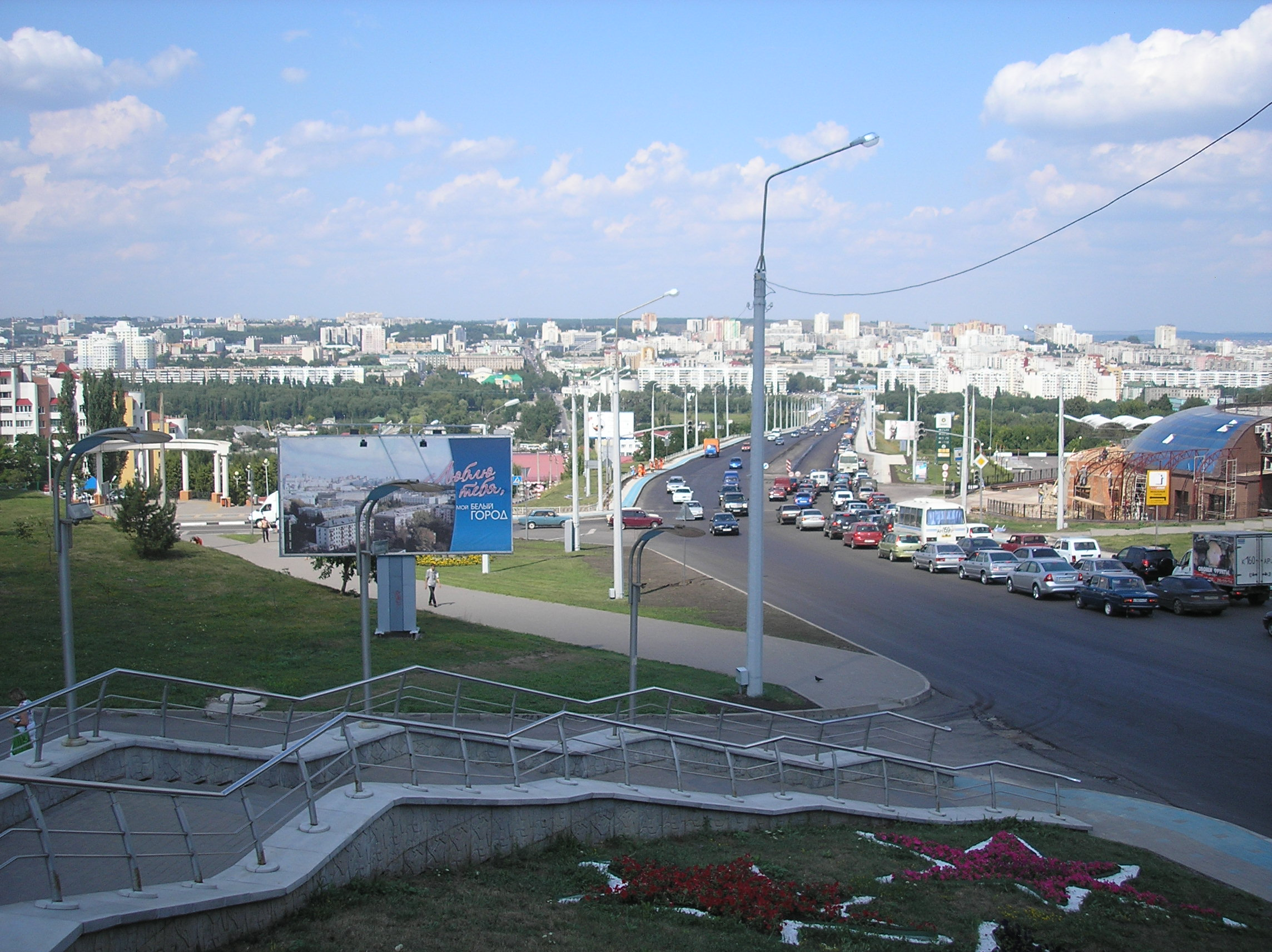
Belgorod city

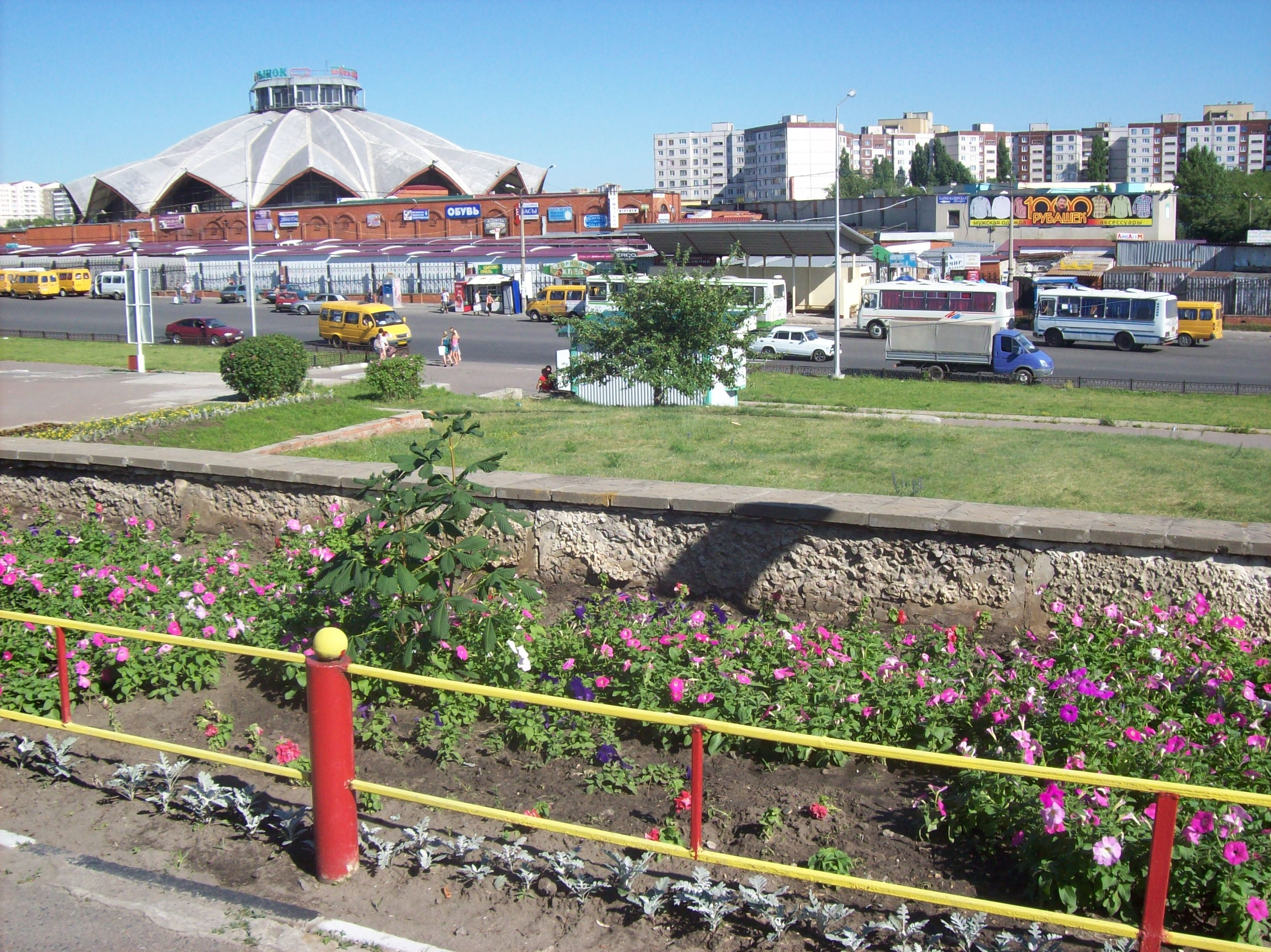
Stary Oskol

Belgorod Oblast is a highly developed industrial-agrarian region, whose economy relies on its enormous wealth of mineral resources and the black chernozem soils. Some 2,713.4 thousand hectares is dedicated to agriculture, over 70% of which are chernozems. Per capita, there are an average of 1.43 hectares of pastoral land, and 1.1 hectares of arable land. Natural forests and forest plantations occupy 248.3 thousand hectares, or 12.5% of the oblast's area. Total timber reserves are estimated to be 34.3 million m^{3}.

Belgorod Oblast has traditionally had and still has strong ties with the agro-industrial complex of Ukraine. Despite its relatively small size, the oblast accounts for one fifth of the trade turnover between Russia and Ukraine.

=== Transport ===
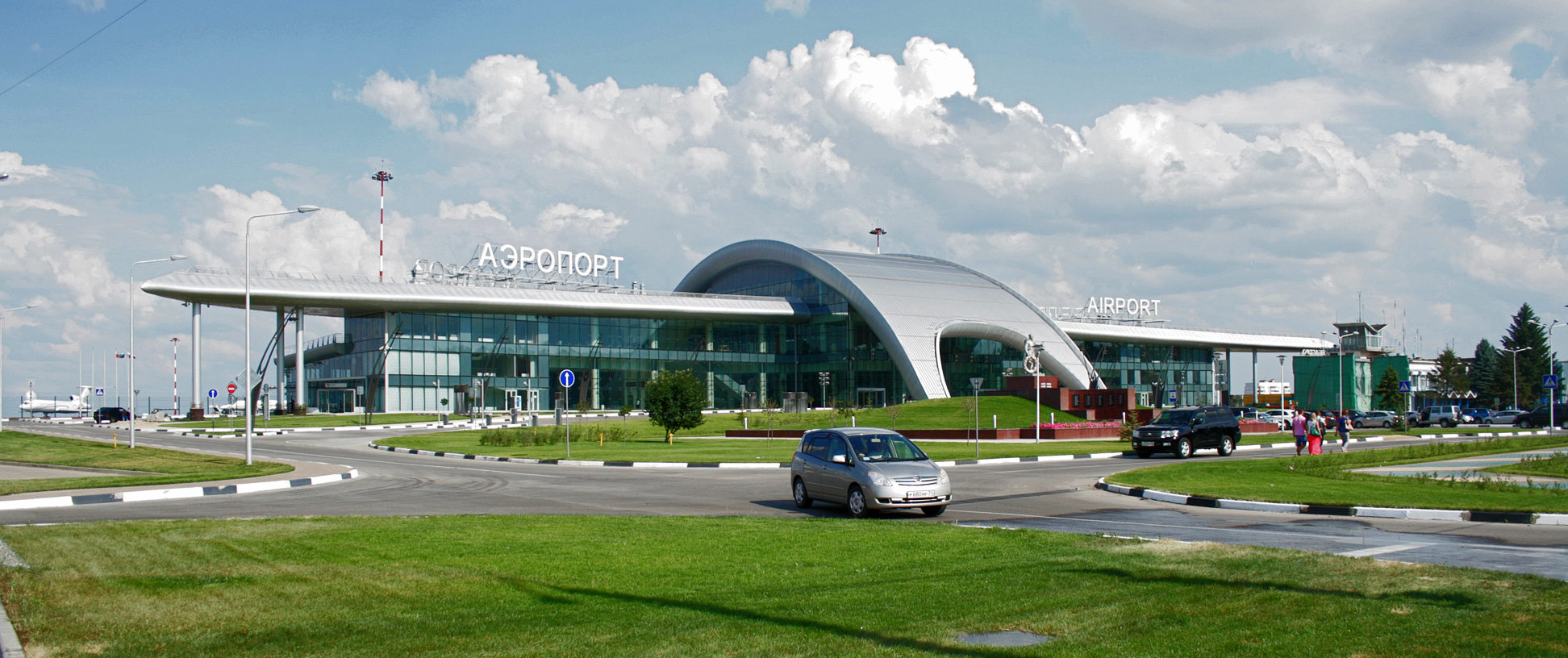
Belgorod International Airport

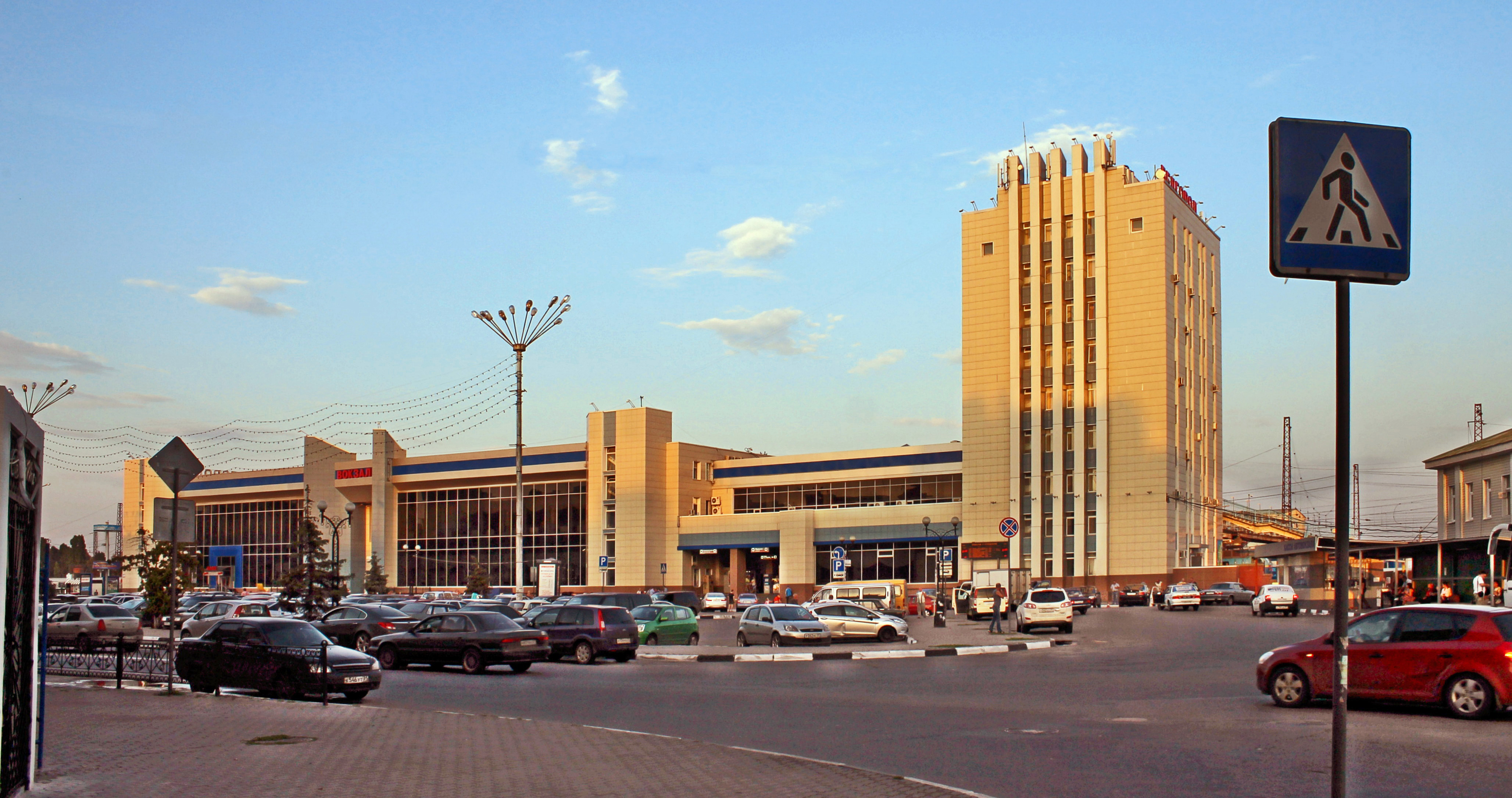
Belgorod Train Station

Important railways and highways of regional significance cross the oblast's territory, connecting Moscow with the southern and western regions of Russia and Ukraine. Of major importance is the Crimea Highway, or federal highway M-2 Crimea, and the Moscow-Kharkiv-Sevastopol railway line. The length of railways for general use is 694.6 km; the length of paved roads is 8,500 km; roughly 87% of the total road surface in the oblast.
