= 417th Rifle Division =

417th Rifle Division (March, 1942 – 1945, October, 1953 – 1955)
- Active: 1942–1945, 1953–1955
- Country: Soviet Union
- Branch: Red Army (1942–1946); Soviet Army (1946–1955)
- Type: Division
- Role: Infantry
- Engagements: World War II; Battle of the Caucasus; Donbass Strategic Offensive; Crimean Offensive; Baltic Offensive; Šiauliai Offensive; Riga Offensive; Memel Offensive Operation; Courland Pocket
- Decorations: Order of the Red Banner; Order of Suvorov
- Battle honours: Sivash

Commanders
- Notable commanders: Maj. Gen. Aleksandr Alekseevich Filatov; Col. Ivan Afanasevich Shevchenko; Col. Nikolai Sergeevich Vasilev; Maj. Gen. Fyodor Mikhailovich Bobrakov

The 417th Rifle Division was formed as an infantry division of the Red Army in the spring of 1942 and served in that role until after the end of the Great Patriotic War. Although it was formed in the Transcaucasus, unlike the 414th and 416th Rifle Divisions formed in about the same place at the same time it was never designated as a National division. After its formation it remained in service in the Caucasus under direct command of the Transcaucasus Front until the summer of 1942, when it was redeployed first to the Northern Group of Forces in that Front and then to the 9th Army. As German Army Group A retreated from the Caucasus in January, 1943 the division was reassigned to the 58th Army and a few months later to 37th Army in North Caucasus Front. In July it redeployed northward to join Southern Front, where it was assigned to the 63rd Rifle Corps in 44th Army in mid-September as the Front (soon re-designated 4th Ukrainian) fought through south Ukraine, eventually reaching the land routes to the Crimea. It took part in the offensive that liberated that region in April and May, 1944, fighting in the 51st Army and winning both a battle honor and the Order of the Red Banner in the process. After the Crimea was cleared the 51st Army was moved far to the north, joining 1st Baltic Front. During operations in the Baltic states the 417th was further distinguished with the award of the Order of Suvorov. In March, 1945 it joined the Courland Group of Forces on the Baltic coast containing the German forces encircled in northwest Latvia. It ended the war there and was soon moved to the Ural Military District before being downsized to a rifle brigade. This brigade was briefly brought back to divisional strength during the Cold War.

== Formation ==
The 417th began forming from March to May 15, 1942, at Tiflis in the Transcaucasus Military District. Its order of battle, based on the first wartime shtat (table of organization and equipment) for rifle divisions, was as follows:

- 1369th Rifle Regiment
- 1372nd Rifle Regiment
- 1376th Rifle Regiment
- 1055th Artillery Regiment
- 445th Antitank Battalion
- 223rd Reconnaissance Company
- 351st Sapper Battalion
- 922nd Signal Battalion (later 513th Signal Company)
- 520th Medical/Sanitation Battalion
- 224th Chemical Protection (Anti-gas) Company
- 570th Motor Transport Company
- 481st Field Bakery
- 585th Divisional Veterinary Hospital
- 1867th Field Postal Station
- 1186th Field Office of the State Bank

The division did not have a commander assigned until May 15 when Maj. Gen. Aleksandr Alekseevich Filatov was appointed to the post; he was replaced on July 23 by Col. Semyon Pavlovich Storozhilov. It remained in the reserves of Transcaucasus Front until August, when it was assigned to the 9th Army in the Northern Group of Forces in the same Front.

== Battle of the Caucasus ==
On August 1 the German 1st Panzer Army began a new drive into the Caucasus region. In the face of this the Transcaucasus Front conducted a forced regrouping, concentrating in a new defensive line along the southern bank of the Terek River and along the Urukh River by August 10. In conjunction with this reserves consisting of the 417th and 89th Rifle Divisions, 52nd Tank Brigade, two Guards-Mortar regiments and several other units were brought forward to the area of Grozny and Ordzhonikidze and designated to organize counterattacks on possible routes where the panzers might appear. The 417th and the 44th Guards Mortar Regiment were specifically ordered to concentrate near Ordzhonikidze. At this time the division was still woefully understrength, with only 500 armed riflemen or sappers.

The 1st Panzer Army renewed its offensive in the direction of Mozdok on August 16. At this time the division had been subordinated to the 9th Army and was positioned in its second echelon due south of that city. The 3rd Panzer Division reached the northern bank of the Terek in the Mozdok region late on August 23 and captured the city two days later. After a week of confused fighting the 1st Panzer Army soon came to a virtual standstill and the Soviet defenses began reorganizing. The commander of 9th Army was replaced but its forces continued to hold the south bank of the Terek, apart from two German-held bridgeheads.

By the beginning of September the 9th Army consisted of the 151st, 176th, 389th and 417th Rifle Divisions, 62nd Naval Rifle Brigade and the 11th Guards Rifle Corps, continuing to defend the Terek from south of Prokhladnyi eastward to south of Mozdok to just northwest of Grozny. It was tasked with preventing the German LII Army Corps and 13th Panzer Division from crossing the river and advancing on Ordzhonikidze. LII Corps began its attack at 0200 hours on September 2, attempting to thrust across the Terek against the positions of 11th Guards Corps. In two days of see-saw fighting the German force, backed by tanks of the 23rd Panzer Division, managed to secure a bridgehead nearly 3km deep. On September 6 a mixed battlegroup from the two panzer divisions with about 40 tanks drove a deep wedge between the 9th and 8th Guards Rifle Brigades, but as it approached the northern foothills of the Terek Mountains it encountered intense artillery, Katyusha and antitank fire as well as heavy counterattacks by Soviet forces, including the 417th supported by 28 Valentine and M3 tanks from the 258th Tank Battalion.

In the savage fighting on September 6 the 258th Battalion lost 22 of its tanks, mostly Valentines. The German battlegroup also suffered heavy losses, with one battalion of the 111th reduced to only 80 men. With the German bridgehead also under attack the battlegroup was forced to withdraw. The new commander of 9th Army, Maj. Gen. K. A. Koroteyev, was determined to inflict maximum damage on the German forces and organized fresh counterattacks the next day, including the 417th attacking from the east. Together these attacks forced the battlegroup further west, and 1st Panzer Army's commander Gen. Ewald von Kleist ordered its forces back to the original bridgehead the next day. The advance was resumed by 13th Panzer early on September 11 with about 100 tanks, penetrating 30 km by the end of September 14 and shattering 11th Guards Corps in the process. 9th Army immediately organized a new series of counterattacks by forming two shock groups, each supported by an army artillery group. One group consisted of the division and the 10th Guards Rifle Corps and was tasked with striking the defenses of 3rd Panzer at Mekenskaia and Predmostnyi in the bridgehead southwest of Mozdok. Attacking in stages from early on September 14 the two shock groups commenced a battle lasting four days before the Germans could muster enough strength to continue their offensive; both sides suffered heavy losses in the process.

On September 20 Colonel Storozhilov handed his command to Col. Grigorii Osipovich Lyaskin, but this officer was in turn replaced by Col. Ivan Afanasevich Shevchenko six days later. Late on September 21 the 13th Panzer was halted north of Planovskoe by extensive Soviet minefields and obstacles. By this time 1st Panzer Army was badly overstretched and the relentless pressure of the 417th and the 10th Guards Corps forced 3rd Panzer to withdraw from the Mekenskaia region to new defenses closer to Mozdok. On October 3 von Kleist signaled that any further advance on Ordzhonikidze would require reinforcements. Meanwhile, on September 29 the STAVKA accepted that the Northern Group of Forces was no longer capable of further offensive action due to losses suffered during its many counterattacks and Lt. Gen. I. I. Maslennikov, commander of the Northern Group, received orders to go over to the defense of the region. By October 23 it appeared to Maslennikov that the German panzer army remained a spent force and he was proposing a counterattack with a group that would include the 417th. In the event this was forestalled two days later when the "spent" Germans launched a renewed drive to the southwest and then to the east; this attack was halted at the gates of Ordzhonikidze on November 5.

== Into Ukraine ==
Later in November the division was transferred to the 44th Army, but in December, as the German retreat from the Caucasus began, it was transferred once again to 58th Army, still in the Northern Group of Transcaucasus Front. In January, 1943 that Army was reassigned to the North Caucasus Front. On February 2 Colonel Shevchenko handed his command to Col. Nikolai Sergeevich Vasilev. In May the 417th was moved to the 37th Army in the same Front. In that same month, in two final changes of command, Colonel Vasilev was reassigned to command of the 216th Rifle Division, and was briefly replaced by Col. Yevgeny Nikolayevich Skorodumov before Col. Fyodor Mikhailovich Bobrakov took over on May 23. Bobrakov would be promoted to the rank of major general on January 17, 1944 and would remain in command for the duration of the war.

In July the division was moved to the reserves of North Caucasus Front and was then moved north to the reserves of Southern Front in August. On September 15 it returned to 44th Army, now as part of the 63rd Rifle Corps; it would remain in this Corps, with two brief reassignments, for the duration. In November it returned to the reserves of the renamed 4th Ukrainian Front where it joined 67th Rifle Corps, before being moved again in December to the 37th Rifle Corps in 3rd Guards Army. In January, 1944, it was back in the Reserve of the Supreme High Command where it rejoined 63rd Corps in 69th Army, before the Corps was reassigned to the 51st Army in February. The 417th would remain in this Army for the duration.

== Crimean Offensive ==
Meanwhile, elements of 4th Ukrainian Front had reached the Perekop Isthmus, the main land route to the Crimea, on October 30, cutting off the German 17th Army and associated Romanian forces there. German units managed to block the Perekop, the Chongar Narrows and the Arabat Spit, but were too late to protect the coastline along the Sivash. Taking advantage of favorable winds and tides, and local intelligence, elements of 51st Army's 10th Rifle Corps began fording through very shallow waters into an area of the Crimea some 10-15km east of Perekop. The belated arrival of German and Romanian reserves were able to contain the bridgehead, but it continued to be held and strengthened by 10th Corps through the winter, with bridges finally in place by December 9.

In January another bridge was completed across the Sivash, capable of handling tanks and heavy artillery. In February the 63rd Corps crossed into the bridgehead, and its commander, Maj. Gen. Pyotr Koshevoy, described the conditions there:

"Here the picture was quite bleak. There was not a tree or a bush... Around us stretched a boundless steppe as flat as a table and a drained white expanse of shallow salt lakes. There were not even any weeds visible... We could see all the way to the horizon. It seemed that the troops were completely open to enemy observation and fire... Nor were there any sources of fresh water in the bridgehead."

In fact the 17th Army command was aware of the arrival of 63rd Corps. When the final Soviet offensive began on April 8 all three rifle corps of 51st Army were in the bridgehead, with 63rd Corps on the left (east) flank facing the Romanian 19th Infantry Division. The artillery opened fire at 0800 hours, delivering a punishing 2-and-a-half hour preparation against the Axis positions. Despite this pounding the 51st Army's main attack was stymied, while 63rd Corps' efforts were more successful. German sources claim that the Romanian forces panicked and ran, while Soviet sources state they fell back in good order. In any case the retreat of 19th Romanian allowed the command of the Army to reinforce the breakthrough with the 32nd Guards Tank Brigade. On the following day masses of Sturmovik attacks and a brigade of Katyushas helped the 63rd Corps to overwhelm the Romanian positions and by noon a small group of tanks was driving south towards Simferopol, followed at dawn on April 11 by the 19th Tank Corps. In recognition of its role in the breakout, the 417th was awarded the battle honor "Sivash".

=== Battle for Sevastopol ===
Sevastopol was not prepared for another siege such as the Soviets had endured in 1941-42; this was not understood by the 4th Ukrainian Front's command and it paused its operations to bring up artillery for a deliberate attack. On April 16 the 51st Army attacked the center of the Axis line but made little progress and another effort on the 23rd fared similarly. The final offensive began at 0930 hours on May 5 with a massive two-hour artillery preparation. 51st Army launched holding attacks this day, then on May 7 pushed back the northern part of the V Army Corps and reached the Sapun Heights with 63rd and two other rifle corps. At 1030 hours the 417th attacked but encountered very strong automatic-weapons and mortar fire from still-intact German positions. Lt. Mikhail Dzigunsky, a rifle platoon commander of the 1372nd Rifle Regiment, succeeded in knocking out three German positions but was killed attempting to destroy a fourth; he was the first of six men to earn the Gold Star of a Hero of the Soviet Union on the Sapun Heights. The 63rd Corps continued to fight its way through German barbed wire and trenches throughout the day and by 1800 hours its forward elements were within 100-200 metres of the crest but the Corps was almost out of ammunition. Unaware that the attack was nearly exhausted the German forces made the mistake of pulling back to regroup. Koshevoy's men surged forward and seized the heights, capturing the commander of the 117th Grenadier Regiment in the process, and 10th Rifle Corps was brought up to solidify their hold. German counterattacks the next day, backed by the last of their assault guns, regained some ground but were smothered under artillery and air attacks. With this failure it was clear that Sevastopol could no longer be held, and Hitler grudgingly authorized a complete evacuation, which ended on May 13. On May 24 the 417th was recognized for its role in the liberation of Sevastopol with the award of the Order of the Red Banner.

== Baltic Offensives ==
Following the liberation of the Crimea in late May, 4th Ukrainian Front found itself in a strategic dead-end. In a major redeployment, 2nd Guards and 51st Armies were shifted to the Reserve of the Supreme High Command, and were then railed northwards in anticipation of the coming summer offensives. In late June the 51st Army was assigned to the 1st Baltic Front; at this time the 417th was still in 63rd Corps, where it would remain for the duration. Exploiting into the gap in the German front created by the destruction of Army Group Centre, by mid-July 51st Army had advanced past the eastern Lithuanian border near the city of Švenčionys. Over the next three weeks the division made a significant advance into northern Lithuania, reaching the vicinity of Linkuva by August 1. On August 9 it was awarded the Order of Suvorov, 2nd Degree, for its part in the liberation of Panevėžys.

When Third Panzer Army launched Operation Doppelkopf on the 15th, the division was located at Tukums in Latvia. By mid-September 51st Army had been shifted to the south, roughly along the Latvian/Lithuanian border, near Eleja. It was still in these positions in the first week of October at the start of the Memel Offensive Operation, which finally cut off Army Group North and created the Courland Pocket. 51st Army remained in this general area on the Baltic coast for the duration of the war, moving to the 2nd Baltic Front in February, 1945 and then to the Kurland Group in Leningrad Front a month later. Following the German surrender the division carried the full title: 417th Rifle, Sivash, Order of the Red Banner, Order of Suvorov Division. (Russian: 417-я стрелковая Сивашская Краснознамённая ордена Суворова дивизия.)

== Postwar ==
In the summer of 1945 the division was relocated to Chelyabinsk in the Ural Military District with the 63rd Corps. It was quickly moved to Chebarkul, where it was reduced to the 45th Separate Rifle Brigade. The brigade was expanded into the 417th Rifle Division in October 1953. In early 1955 the division was renumbered as the 78th Rifle Division. On June 4, 1957 it was converted into the 78th Motor Rifle Division. The 78th became a training division on May 24, 1962, directly subordinated to the district headquarters. It was redesignated as the 471st District Training Center in 1987, and reduced to the 5355th Weapons and Equipment Storage Base in 1989.
