= 71st Guards Rifle Division =

- Active: 1943–1947
- Country: Soviet Union
- Branch: Red Army
- Type: Division
- Role: Infantry
- Engagements: Battle of Kursk; Belgorod-Kharkov Offensive; Battle of the Dniepr; Battle of Nevel (1943); Operation Bagration; Vitebsk-Orsha Offensive; Baltic Offensive; Siauliai Offensive; Operation Doppelkopf; Riga Offensive (1944); Memel Offensive; Courland Pocket
- Decorations: Order of Lenin; Order of the Red Banner
- Battle honours: Kharkov; Vitebsk

Commanders
- Notable commanders: Maj. Gen. Ivan Prokofievich Sivakov; Col. Nikolai Ivanovich Babakhin; Col. Nikolai Nikolaievich Lozhkin; Lt. Col. Georgii Aleksandrovich Inozemtsev

The 71st Guards Rifle Division was reformed as an elite infantry division of the Red Army in March 1943, based on the 1st formation of the 23rd Rifle Division, and served in that role until after the end of the Great Patriotic War.

As the 23rd it had fought in the Battle of Stalingrad and distinguished itself during Operation Ring in the 21st Army. It remained assigned to that Army when it was redesignated as the 6th Guards Army and remained under its command for most of the rest of the war. It moved north to the Kursk area joining Voronezh Front and played an important role in the defense of the south face of the salient as part of the 22nd Guards Rifle Corps during Operation Zitadelle. Following this victory it fought in the Belgorod-Kharkov Offensive in August and continued advancing toward the Dniepr River into the early autumn. With the rest of its Army it was transferred north to the 2nd Baltic Front where it took part in the later stages of the Battle of Nevel as well as the slow, grinding assaults towards Vitebsk during the winter. In the opening stages of Operation Bagration, now as part of 1st Baltic Front, the 71st Guards won a battle honor for the liberation of that city and soon entered the so-called "Baltic Gap" that had opened between Army Groups North and Center; its rifle regiments would all win the honorific "Polotsk" after helping to take that city. The division would remain in the Baltic states for the rest of its existence, advancing through Latvia and Lithuania eventually to the Baltic coast, assisting in the liberation of Riga and Klaipėda and then serving in the Kurland Group of Forces containing and attacking the German units isolated there right up to the final surrender. The division remained in the same area until it was disbanded in mid-1947.

== Formation ==
The 23rd was redesignated as the 71st Guards on March 1, a month after the German surrender at Stalingrad, and officially received its Guards banner on April 12. Once the division completed its reorganization its order of battle was as follows:

- 210th Guards Rifle Regiment (from 89th Rifle Regiment)
- 213th Guards Rifle Regiment (from 117th Rifle Regiment)
- 219th Guards Rifle Regiment (from 225th Rifle Regiment)
- 151st Guards Artillery Regiment (from 211th Artillery Regiment)
- 76th Guards Antitank Battalion (from 106th Antitank Battalion)
- 72nd Guards Reconnaissance Company (from 88th Reconnaissance Company)
- 82nd Guards Sapper Battalion (from 131st Sapper Battalion)
- 102nd Guards Signal Battalion (from 45th Signal Battalion) (after December 25, 1944 102nd Guards Signal Company)
- 74th Guards Medical/Sanitation Battalion (from 61st Medical/Sanitation Battalion)
- 78th Guards Chemical Defense (Anti-gas) Company
- 75th Guards Motor Transport Company
- 656th Field Bakery
- 68th Guards Divisional Veterinary Hospital
- 60th Field Postal Station
- 158th Field Office of the State Bank

Col. Ivan Prokofievich Sivakov, who had commanded the 23rd since December 11, 1942 remained in command; he would be promoted to the rank of major general on September 15. His chief of staff was Lt. Col. Pavel Ivanovich Lyubomudrov. The division inherited the Order of the Red Banner and the "Kharkov" honorific that the 23rd's predecessor, the 1st Ust-Medveditskaya Rifle Division, had earned during the Civil War, as well as the Order of Lenin the 23rd itself had received for its work on the construction of the Kharkov Tractor Works in 1932. In April, after the 71st Guards had recovered part of its strength from the Stalingrad fighting, it was noted that its personnel were roughly 50 percent Russian and 50 percent of various Asian nationalities, nearly all from the year groups 1903–1925.

== Battle of Kursk ==
The 21st Army began moving north by rail to the middle part of the overall front before it was redesignated, along with much of the rest of Col. Gen. K. K. Rokossovsky's former Don Front, now Central Front. The STAVKA directed him, on March 7, to attack with his forces toward Oryol. In turn he sent orders to the Army commander, Lt. Gen. I. M. Chistyakov, to go over to the offensive on the morning of March 10 with his 51st, 52nd, 71st Guards and 375th Rifle Divisions. The attack was to begin on a line from Trosna to Chern, pass through the units of 13th Army, and continue in the direction of Oryol and Kromy, eventually reaching Rzhavets by March 13. In the event, due to the German counteroffensive that recaptured Kharkov, at 0200 hours on March 11 Chistyakov was ordered to move his Army by rail south to the region north of Belgorod where it came under command of Army Gen. N. F. Vatutin's Voronezh Front.

German plan of attack at Kursk. Note location of Butovo (Butowo) on the 6th Guards Army sector.

During the preparations for the German summer offensive the 71st Guards was assigned to the 22nd Guards Rifle Corps, joining the 67th and 90th Guards Rifle Divisions. 6th Guards Army was responsible for the eastern sector of the south face of the Kursk salient where the attack of the 4th Panzer Army was most likely to be made. The division was assigned to its Army's right (west) flank, adjacent to 40th Army. As of July 1 the Corps had the 67th and 71st Guards deployed in the first echelon and the 90th Guards in second echelon. The boundary between the 67th and 71st was secured with assets of the latter including a battery of its 151st Guards Artillery Regiment, a battery of regimental guns, two batteries of 82mm mortars, 11 antitank guns, 14 antitank rifles, three heavy and nine light machine guns. The 67th Guards disposed of somewhat fewer weapons. These were located southwest and south of the village of Cherkasskoe, behind a minefield and an antitank ditch.

At 1500 hours the day before the official opening of Zitadelle the XXXXVIII Panzer Corps launched a probing attack against 22nd Guards Corps. This was necessary due to the depth of no-man's-land between the two sides, an area that was dominated by a set of hills that blocked artillery observation from the German forward lines to the first Soviet defensive belt; these hills also contained Soviet outposts. This attack was carried out by infantry backed by engineers, assault guns and tank destroyers and supported by aircraft. Elements of the 332nd Infantry Division struck the 71st Guards which at first did not offer much resistance. Fifty-seven Red Army soldiers were taken prisoner and nine more crossed over to the German lines, but the defense stiffened as the German force reached the railway line west of Gertsovka. This village was a hub of the division's forward defenses and was assaulted by panzergrenadiers of the 3rd Panzer Division. In spite of effective support from Stukas it was only in the late evening that the village was secured at a cost of 24 killed, 102 wounded and four missing, and mopping-up continued until the early morning. The Panzergrenadier Division Großdeutschland to the east struck the boundary between the 71st and 67th Guards on a ridge between Gertsovka and Butovo. This advance initially proceeded well but soon ran into the defenses noted above. The panzergrenadiers began to receive flanking artillery fire and got caught up in the minefield leading to significant casualties, especially among officers. Butovo was held by the 67th Guards which fended off the 11th Panzer Division until the morning of July 5, the start of the main battle.

The general offensive against 22nd Guards Corps began at 0600 hours. The main attack from 11th Panzer and Großdeutschland came from the Gertsevo - Butovo area toward Korovino and Cherkasskoe. The 71st Guards received up to a regiment of infantry backed by 30 tanks at 0900 but over the next hour all German efforts to break through to Korovino were unsuccessful. At about this time the 27th Antitank Brigade arrived to reinforce the boundary between the 71st and 67th Guards. After regrouping a new attack by two regiments backed by 200 tanks and up to 100 aircraft attempted to split this boundary and encircle Cherkasskoe from the west. The heaviest fighting fell on the 67th Guards in and near this village but made only limited gains at heavy cost. At the same time, in an effort to secure the flank of this thrust, the 71st Guards was struck by an infantry regiment supported by 15-20 tanks attacking toward Dmitrievka; three attempts by this group were repulsed by artillery and mortar fire and by day's end the division was continuing to hold most of its initial positions.

On July 6 the 4th Panzer Army had to solve a complex problem. While the II SS Panzer Corps had made notable progress against the left flank of 6th Guards Army the day before, the XXXXVIII Panzer Corps had been unable to penetrate the first defensive belt. Attempting to make up for lost time the latter Corps resumed its drive at 0300 hours with the objectives of breaking through along the Butovo-Iakovlevo road in the region of Olkhovka and Dubrova in order to link up with the 167th Infantry Division that was guarding the left flank of the II SS Corps. The 71st Guards was attacked simultaneously by up to 100 tanks and two regiments of infantry but held its sector from Bubny to Novo-Ivanovka to Krasnyi Pochinok to Mikhailovka for around two-and-a-half hours, after which it abandoned Krasnyi Pochinok and fell back to a new line. Advancing to the north by the close of the day the German force had seized Zavidovka, and the division's left flank had consolidated along a line from height 217.9 to Dmitrievka to Setnoe to Zarytoe to Podymovka.

The XXXXVIII Panzer Corps regrouped overnight on July 6/7 for a renewed drive on the Oboyan axis. Its forces in the Zavidovka area went over to the defensive to hold its left flank. To ease command and control issues the 40th Army took command of the 71st Guards. At 2300 hours General Vatutin ordered counterstrokes against the flanks of the panzer corps to begin on the morning of July 8. The 71st Guards and 161st Rifle Divisions were to attack in the general direction of Gertsovka at 1030 hours after a 30-minute artillery preparation. General Chistyakov's memoirs state:

I gave a report on the situation to Front Commander N. F. Vatutin, who in turn gave me an order: "Assemble the units of the 71st Guards Rifle Division in the area of Berezovka and Noven'koe. Take the 6th Tank Corps and attack the enemy in the left flank in the general direction of Krasnaia Poliana, and I will support you with aviation."

Chistyakov wrote that the attacks "did not bring the desired results" and were stopped by German armor, artillery and air strikes before reaching the objective, after which Vatutin ordered his forces to dig in. Lt. Col. Lyubomudrov reported on the work of his subordinates during the first days of the battle as follows:

As a result of intense combat between 4 and 7 July 1943, units of the division demonstrated exceptional heroism to repel the enemy attacks; however, a series of the crudest shortcomings in the combat activities of the troops often leads to bad consequences... The untimely reports and messages from the division's lower-standing headquarters at times contain no information at all about the situation... For example, the 219th Guards Regiment yielded Hill 235.6 to the enemy and didn't report this; the 213th Guards Regiment allowed two enemy battalions to reach Dmitrievka, and reported it only when the threat that the enemy would take Dmitrievka had emerged... The headquarters of the regiments do not conduct reconnaissance... The cooperation with the means of reinforcement and supporting assets is poorly organized; the unit commanders all too often don't know who is located on the right, left or behind them... The enemy's strength, as a rule, is exaggerated while our own forces are plainly understated... Unit commanders are not reporting the daily losses in personnel and equipment or the combat readiness and supply status of the units, which places the division command in a difficult situation when making decisions.

The division remained in a defensive posture on a lengthy front over the next two days. By the end of July 10 it was clear that 4th Panzer Army would most likely continue active operations along the Oboyan and Prokhorovka axes. Its leading units had taken significant casualties and it had expended its reserves and in order to continue its offensive it would have to take forces from its flanks. Taking this into account Vatutin planned a further counterattack for July 12 in order to encircle and defeat the main German groupings on these axes. At 0700 hours on July 11 the 71st Guards was transferred back to 6th Guards Army, along with the 184th and 219th Rifle Divisions from 40th Army. The 22nd Guards Corps' attack was greatly delayed by the late arrival of the latter divisions at their jumping-off positions. The 71st Guards was supporting the Corps' right flank and attacked at 1100 hours; by the close of the day it was fighting for the villages of Mikhailovka, Krasnyi Pochinok and Korovino.

=== Belgorod-Kharkov Offensive ===
The climax of the battle was reached at Prokhorovka on July 12 after which the German offensive was shut down. The start of the Belgorod-Kharkov Offensive was set for August 3. The 6th and 5th Guards Armies plus the 1st and 5th Guards Tank Armies were to attack from a 24 km-wide line from Butovo to Trirechnoe in the general direction of Bogodukhov and Valki. By now the 22nd Guards Corps had returned to its pre-battle composition. Belgorod was liberated on August 5. Two days later the offensive began to focus in the area of Bogodukhov and 6th Guards was brought up to reinforce 1st Tank Army. By August 11 the Army was advancing on Poltava and in a directive from General Vatutin on the afternoon of August 13 the 71st and 67th Guards were ordered to reach a line from Berezovka to Kolomak and secure it to prevent any German breakthrough along this sector. However a counterthrust on August 15 by 3rd SS Panzergrenadier Division Totenkopf flanked the Army and drove it off to the north, reaching the line of the Merla River. The German forces went over to the defense on this axis on August 17.

== Redeployment to the North ==
In the third week of September the 6th Guards Army was withdrawn to the Reserve of the Supreme High Command and began to redeploy to the north-central sector of the front, arriving in 2nd Baltic Front in October; the 71st Guards remained in 22nd Guards Corps.

=== Battle of Nevel ===
The Army soon entered the salient west of Nevel that had been created by the 3rd and 4th Shock Armies in early October and on November 10 went into action in the lake region northeast of the town. It went over to the attack in the narrow sector between Lake Bolshoi Ivan and Lake Nevel against German defenses at Karataia manned by the 56th and 69th Infantry Divisions of 16th Army's I Army Corps. 22nd Guards Corps was deployed on the right with the 71st Guards in first echelon. The assault was supported by two tank brigades but made only painful progress, as indicated in the divisional history:

The division's first echelon regiments advanced 600-700 meters on the first day of combat and approached right up to the forward edge of the enemy's defense... Occupying dominating heights, the enemy had created powerful and well-camouflaged defensive positions. The division artillery was not able to destroy or even suppress the enemy's firing systems. The terrain, which was broken up by ravines and swamps, did not permit the full use of tanks in the attack and the foul weather hindered the deployment of aircraft. The attack by the division and the other formations of 6th Guards Army did not produce the expected results at that time.

The Army went over to the defense on November 15. By the end of the month the 71st and 67th Guards were reassigned to the 96th Rifle Corps, still in 6th Guards Army.

On December 8 the German 122nd Infantry Division punched a small penetration through the defenses of the 71st Guards which required intervention by the 23rd Guards Rifle Corps. This helped convince the Soviet command to finally eliminate the German salient from Novosokolniki south nearly to Nevel. In late December the Front began a new offensive in the direction of Idritsa and Pustoshka, while 1st Baltic Front continued attacking south towards Vitebsk. 2nd Baltic Front was caught off-guard when 16th Army began evacuating the salient on December 29. The 71st Guards was now in the 97th Rifle Corps directly north of Nevel and took part in the pursuit of the retreating German forces, along with the 67th and 51st Guards and backed by two tank brigades and a regiment. While the history of 6th Guards Army states that I Army Corps was driven back in heavy fighting it appears from German records and Soviet casualty figures that most of the combat occurred when the new German defense line at the base of the salient was reached on January 6, 1944. Within a month the Red Army offensives at Leningrad and Novgorod forced 16th Army to wheel its defenses westward to near Pskov. On January 12 General Sivakov was seriously wounded when his vehicle ran over a mine. He was replaced by Col. Nikolai Ivanovich Babakhin.

=== Operation Bagration ===
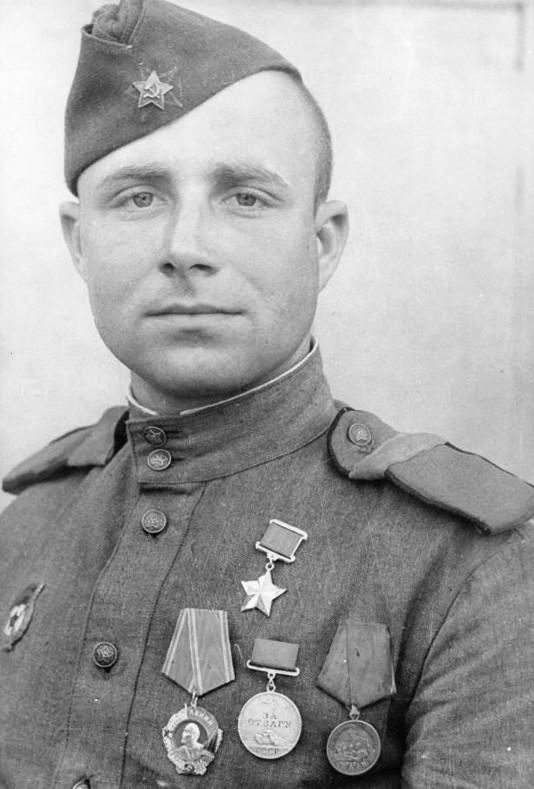
Senior Sergeant Ivan Yermolayevich Malyshev of the 102nd Guards Separate Signal Company was made a Hero of the Soviet Union for his actions in the crossing of the Western Dvina

During January the division was transferred to the 12th Guards Rifle Corps before being reassigned to the 23rd Guards Corps in February when the 6th Guards Army was transferred to the 1st Baltic Front.

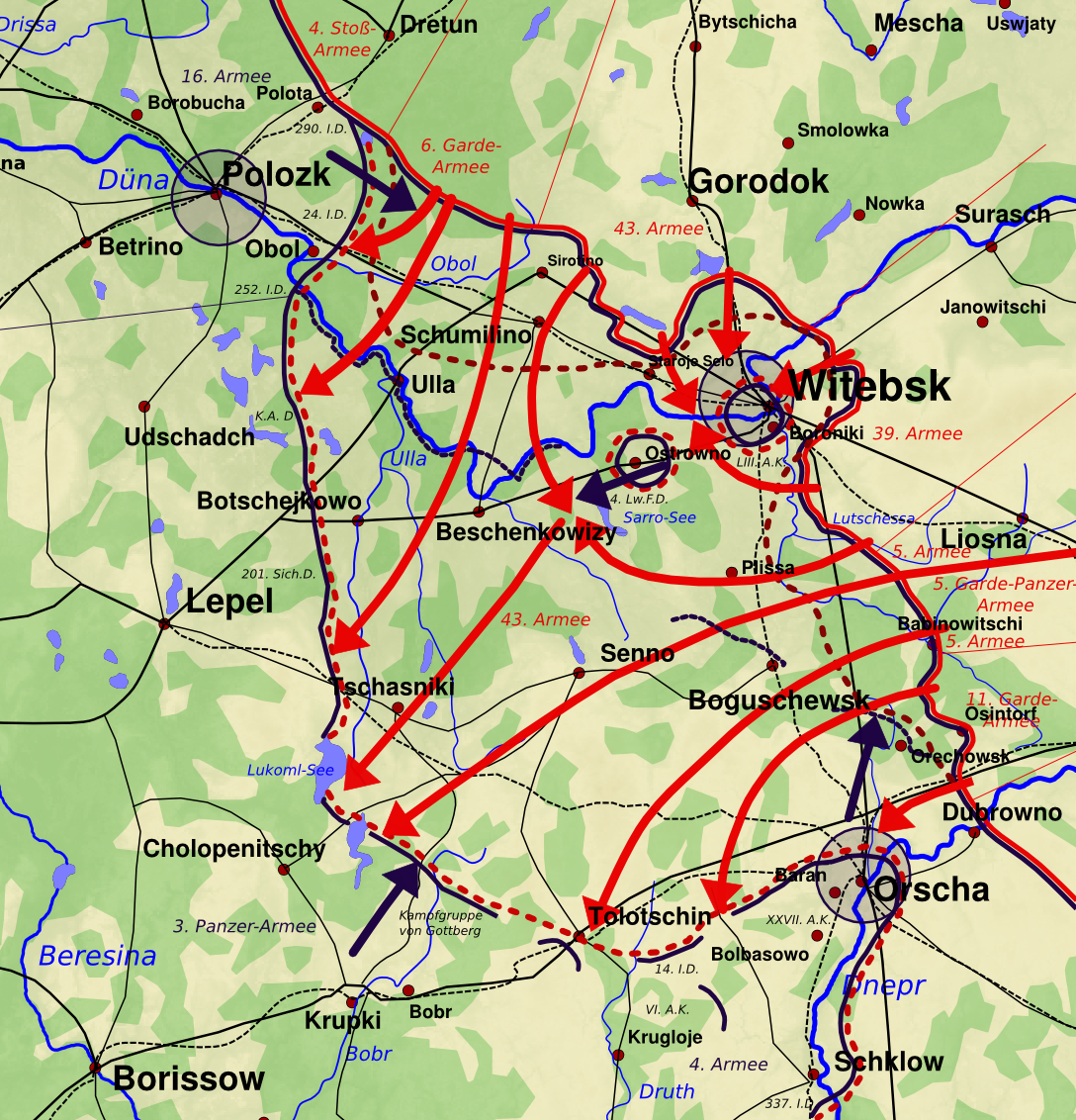
Vitebsk-Orsha Offensive.

In the planning for Operation Bagration, the Corps was given an assault role, compressed into a front of just 10 km, working with the two assault corps of the adjacent 43rd Army. 6th Guards Army had been moved in secrecy into the line north of the German-held Vitebsk salient over three nights previous to the attack. It deployed the 22nd and 23rd Guards Corps in the first echelon with the 103rd and 2nd Guards Rifle Corps in the second. The 23rd Guards was to break through the German defense between Byvalino and Novaya Igumenshchina and then drive headlong in the direction of Dobrino, cut the rail line and highway between Vitebsk and Polotsk, and capture a line from Verbali to Gubitsa. Subsequently it was to attack toward Zheludova and Pyatigorsk and clear a passage for the commitment of the 1st Tank Corps. Although far from fully recovered from his injuries, on June 6 General Sivakov returned to his command of the division. The Soviet assault on June 22 began at dawn with a very heavy artillery barrage against the positions of the German 252nd Infantry Division and Corps Detachment D. By noon the assault battalions of the division had broken through the second German defense line and reached the Obol River. The following armored group crossed the river and advanced a total of 7 km by evening. On the second day the advance came up against the German defenses at Shumilino. The 43rd Army's 306th and 179th Rifle Divisions, backed by the 71st Guards, enveloped this position and drove Corps Detachment D back through the string of lakes in front of the German second defensive zone known as the Tiger Line. The 23rd Guards Corps broke through this zone and crossed the Western Dvina south of Shumilino by the end of the day. This advance also cut the highway and the railroad between Vitebsk and Polotsk. The next day units of the division reached the Western Dvina River and, using improvised means, crossed it on the move under German fire. At least 13 men of the division would later be made Heroes of the Soviet Union for their parts in this operation. On June 25 the 71st Guards would lead the liberation of the city of Beshankovichy before continuing its advance towards Polotsk. In recognition of these accomplishments the division received an honorific:

VITEBSK... 71st Guards Rifle Division (Maj. Gen. Sivakov, Ivan Prokofievich)... By order of the Supreme High Command of 26 June 1944, and a commendation in Moscow, the troops who participated in the liberation of Vitebsk are given a salute of 20 salvoes by 224 guns.

By this time the makeup of the division had changed considerably from April of the previous year and was now noted as being 90 percent Ukrainian nationals.

== Baltic Offensive ==
When Polotsk was liberated on July 4 all three of the division's rifle regiments were honored:

POLOTSK... 210th Guards Rifle Regiment (Lt. Col. Krivomlin, Fyodor Grigorevich)... 213th Guards Rifle Regiment (Lt. Col. Savidi, Anton Kharlamovich)... 219th Guards Rifle Regiment (Lt. Col. Resovskii, Aleksandr Yosifovich)...By order of the Supreme High Command of 4 July 1944, and a commendation in Moscow, the troops who participated in the liberation of Polotsk are given a salute of 20 salvoes by 224 guns.

Following this battle the 71st Guards advanced into the Baltic states, where it would remain into the postwar era. By July 20 it was involved in the prolonged and heavy fighting for the Latvian city of Daugavpils when General Sivakov was killed in action as a result of German artillery fire, just two days before he would be officially awarded the Gold Star of a Hero of the Soviet Union. He was not officially replaced until August 9 when Maj. Gen. Dmitrii Semenovich Kuropatenko took over command. By this time the division had returned to the 22nd Guards Corps, which was in the reserves of 1st Baltic Front.

Army Groups North and Center launched Operation Doppelkopf on August 16 at which time the division was located near Biržai and after helping to fight off the counteroffensive advanced on Šiauliai. On October 31 the three rifle regiments would be further recognized for their roles in the fighting for this city, with the 210th winning the Order of the Red Banner, the 213th receiving the Order of Suvorov, 3rd Degree, and the 219th being presented the Order of Kutuzov, 3rd Degree. By the beginning of September the 71st Guards had been assigned to the 2nd Guards Rifle Corps, still in 6th Guards Army. On September 25 General Kuropatenko had left command of the division, handing over to Col. Nikolai Nikolaievich Lozhkin.

Over the following months the 1st Baltic Front pushed through to the Baltic coast, and what remained of Army Group North was confined to the Courland Pocket. On January 18, 1945 Colonel Lozhkin was succeeded in command by Hero of the Soviet Union Lt. Col. Georgii Aleksandrovich Inozemtsev, who would continue in command into the postwar. He had earned his gold star as commander of the 201st Guards Rifle Regiment of the 67th Guards Division in the crossing of the Western Dvina. Born at Bataysk he had been a historian and civil servant, as well as a Red Army reservist, before the war. After leaving the Red Army he published a number of articles and books on the history and prehistory of the Rostov region before his death in 1957. In February the 1st Baltic Front was disbanded and the 6th Guards Army was moved to 2nd Baltic Front; in March this Front was also dissolved and the Army moved to Leningrad Front for the duration, by April as part of the Kurland Group of Forces.

== Postwar ==
At the time of the German surrender the men and women of the division held the full official title of 71st Guards Rifle, Kharkov-Vitebsk, Order of Lenin, Order of the Red Banner Division. (Russian: 71-я гвардейская стрелковая Харьковско-Витебская ордена Ленина, Краснознамённая дивизия.) In July it rejoined the 2nd Guards Corps, still in 6th Guards Army in the Baltic Military District. It was first stationed as Kaunas before being transferred in May 1946 to Klaipėda. The division was finally disbanded in June 1947.
