= 325th Rifle Division =

325th Rifle Division (September 8, 1941 – April 18, 1943) 325th Rifle Division (May 7, 1944 – 1945)
- Active: 1941–1945
- Country: Soviet Union
- Branch: Red Army
- Type: Infantry
- Size: Division
- Engagements: Battle of Moscow; Battles of Rzhev; Operation Star; Baltic Offensive; Vistula-Oder Offensive; East Prussian Offensive
- Battle honours: Dvinsk (2nd formation)

Commanders
- Notable commanders: Maj. Gen. Nikolai Boleslavovich Ibianskii; Maj. Gen. Nikita Zakharovich Sukhorebrov

The 325th Rifle Division was formed in September 1941, as a standard Red Army rifle division, made up of older reservists and young men with no prewar training. As with many other divisions in the 320–330 series it was flung into the fighting west of Moscow in the 10th Army to defend the capital and then to take part in the winter counteroffensive. After a year on a quiet sector the division rejoined the fighting in the late winter of 1943, eventually distinguishing itself sufficiently to be redesignated as the 90th Guards Rifle Division. After disappearing from the Soviet order of battle for more than a year a new division was formed in the spring of 1944, based on a cadre of two distinguished rifle brigades, and gave very creditable service for the duration, completing its combat path in East Prussia.

== 1st Formation ==
The division first formed on September 8, 1941 at Morshansk in the Oryol Military District. Col. Nikolai Boleslavovich Ibianskii was appointed to command on the same day and he would lead the division through its entire 1st formation, being promoted to Major General on July 21, 1942. Its basic order of battle was as follows:

- 1092nd Rifle Regiment
- 1094th Rifle Regiment
- 1096th Rifle Regiment
- 893rd Artillery Regiment

The division formed in the eastern part of the Oryol District. It was still short of all sorts of basic equipment when it was assigned to 10th (Reserve) Army in the Reserve of the Supreme High Command in October. Short or not, it went into battle with 10th Army in early December on the southern flank of Western Front. At this time it was still noted as having insufficient weaponry, including antitank guns, mortars and machine guns, and also lacked communications equipment and transport.

=== Battle of Moscow ===
By December 5, just prior to the start of the Soviet counteroffensive, the 325th was at Spassk-Ryazansky when it received a directive from STAVKA, along with the rest of 10th Army to attack the next day in the direction of Mikhailov and Stalinogorsk. By December 7 the division was fighting along a line from Pecherniki to Berezovo; the Army as a whole was facing the main forces of 29th and 10th Motorized Divisions, with units of 18th Panzer Division and 112th Infantry Division farther south. As the advance unfolded the Army's left-flank divisions, including the 325th, tended to lag, forcing Western Front headquarters to demand that the pace be increased. On the morning of December 14 the division had concentrated in the area of Yepifan. The advance continued that day, and by December 26 the division was moving tho the line Kurakovo - Temryan behind the 322nd Rifle Division which was beginning the fight for Belyov, one of the Army's key objectives.

On December 28 the 325th and 326th were in 10th Army's second echelon in the Boloto - Gorodnya - Kalinovka area. The following day the division was ordered to begin advancing to reach the Kozelsk area and concentrated there by the 30th.

As the advance continued the new objective became Mosalsk. 1st Guards Cavalry Corps was directed there on January 8, 1942, and overnight liberated the town with the help of the 325th, which was then subordinated to that Corps. The intention was to then continue to advance on Vyasma after regrouping. By the end of January 11 the division had reached Aleksino - Rodnya, 4 km north of Mosalsk. On January 14 the cavalry cut the Minsk - Warsaw highway in the Lyudkovo - Solovevka area, while the 325th covered the Corps operations by defending the line Aleksino - Vysokoe - Khotibino - Pyshkino, but by now German Army Group Center was receiving reinforcements from the west and its air support was growing stronger. The fighting for the highway went on until January 29, and although the cavalry continued to advance, the 325th did not, and Vyasma remained in enemy hands.

=== Operations in Central Front ===
In February 1942, the division was transferred to 50th Army, still in Western Front, just to the north. It remained on this relatively quiet sector until February 1943. Meanwhile, Col.-Gen. K. K. Rokossovsky's Don Front, having crushed the German 6th Army at Stalingrad in Operation Koltso, was moving north. On February 15 these forces, with additions, were re-designated as Central Front. One of the additions was the 325th, which was transferred to 21st Army within that Front. This redeployment ran into many difficulties, mostly with regard to transportation in mid-winter, and it wasn't until mid-March that this Army was in a position to begin to advance. The intention of the STAVKA was that 21st Army would take part in an offensive to destroy the German forces in the salient around Oryol, liberate Bryansk, and advance into the rear of Army Group Center. In the event this operation failed to reach these ambitious objectives, but the 325th scored some successful tactical actions in its course, so when the 21st Army became the 6th Guards Army in April, the 325th was re-designated as the 90th Guards Rifle Division on April 18.

== 2nd Formation ==
After an absence of over a year from the Red Army order of battle, a new 325th Rifle Division was formed on May 7, 1944, in the 22nd Army of 2nd Baltic Front, based on cadres from the 23rd Rifle Brigade and the 54th Rifle Brigade.

=== 23rd Rifle Brigade ===
This brigade, based on training and reserve units in the Kharkov Military District, began forming in October 1941. Uniquely among Red Army rifle brigades the rifle battalions kept their pre-war reserve battalion numbers. In November the brigade was evacuated to the Stalingrad area ahead of the German advance. After completing its training and equipment it was railed far to the north, where it was assigned to the 2nd Shock Army in Volkhov Front in December. The 23rd took part in the Lyuban Offensive Operation in January 1942. As of January 27 it was part of Operational Group Zhiltsov with two other rifle brigades with orders "to liquidate the enemy in the Zemtitsy and Liubtsy region and, later, sever the Leningrad - Novgorod rail line..." By March it was trapped in the Volkhov Pocket, and took various (mostly depleted) units under its command, so that in early April its order of battle consisted of:

- 48th, 50th and 95th Rifle Battalions
- One antitank battalion (12 57mm guns)
- One artillery battalion (4 76mm M1927 howitzers, 8 76mm M1939 cannons)
- Two mortar battalions (24 50mm and 12 82mm in one, 8 120mm in the other)
- One submachine gun company
- One sapper company
- One reconnaissance company
- One antitank rifle platoon
- Motorized supply and medical companies
- Brigade signal detachment
- One NKVD rifle platoon and the brigade NKVD security platoon

Later that month most of the brigade managed to slip out of the pocket and joined 52nd Army in trying to hold an escape route open until May, when it was reassigned to the cadre headquarters of 2nd Shock which was reforming outside the pocket. On June 1 the brigade had a strength of 367 officers, 376 NCOs, and 1,280 enlisted men, which was better than could be expected after the previous five months of fighting.

During the Third Siniavino Offensive operation in August the 23rd was part of 4th Guards Rifle Corps, still in 2nd Shock Army. When the offensive began the 8th Army initially penetrated the German front in another attempt to break the siege of Leningrad. However, German reserves soon contained the advance, and by August 30 the Volkhov Front commander, Army General K. A. Meretskov, began throwing in his reserves, including 4th Guards, in a futile attempt to sustain his offensive. By early October the Soviet forces had been thrown back to their start line with heavy casualties, although they had frustrated German plans to use their 11th Army to seize Leningrad.

From October to December the brigade was in the 3rd Reserve Army in the Reserve of the Supreme High Command for rebuilding near Kalinin. In January 1943, it was assigned to the 3rd Shock Army in Kalinin Front where it took part in the late stages of the Battle for Velikiye Luki. In October, the 23rd was reassigned to 22nd Army in 2nd Baltic Front, where it remained for the rest of its existence. It was briefly in 97th Rifle Corps in the spring of 1944, but otherwise served as a separate unit in 22nd Army until it was disbanded to help form the new 325th Rifle Division on May 7.

=== 54th Rifle Brigade ===
This brigade began forming in October 1941, based on students in the military training units in the Volga Military District. In December it was shipped north and became one of the first units assigned to the new 3rd Shock Army as it arrived at the front. Beginning on January 9, 1942, 3rd and 4th Shock Armies mounted an offensive that, over two weeks, created the Toropets salient and brought 3rd Shock to Kholm and the outskirts of Velikiye Luki before running out of steam. The 54th would remain in the Kholm area under command of 3rd Shock in Kalinin Front until January 1943, when it was assigned to 6th Guards Rifle Corps in the Front reserves. In April it was reassigned to 22nd Army in Northwestern Front, and it remained in 22nd Army from that time on. It spent late 1943 and early 1944 advancing towards the Baltic states, under command of either 44th or 97th Rifle Corps until March, when it became a separate unit under Army command. On May 7 it was disbanded to help create the 2nd formation of the 325th Rifle Division.

== Baltic Campaign ==
The division's order of battle remained the same as that of the first formation. Col. Nikita Zakharovich Sukhorebrov, who had commanded 54th Rifle Brigade since October 1943, was given command of the division, which he would hold for the duration of the war, being promoted to Major General on July 29. It was assigned to 44th Rifle Corps and would remain in this corps until nearly the end of the year.

On July 8, as its Front entered the general offensive, the 325th was facing the German Panther Line defenses from across the Alolya River, about 25 km northeast of Idritsa. In August, 44th Corps was transferred to 3rd Shock Army in the same Front, and in September to 2nd Guards Army in 1st Baltic Front. By mid-September the division had advanced well into Latvia, approaching Gulbene. As the advance continued the 325th gave a good account of itself in the liberation of Dvinsk and received the city's name as an honorific:

"DAUGAVPILS... 325th Rifle Division (Colonel Sukhorebrov, Nikita Zakharovich)... The troops that participated in the liberation of Daugavpils and Rezekne, by order of the Supreme High Commission of July 27, 1944, and a commendation in Moscow, are given a salute of 20 artillery salvos from 224 guns."

In November the division and its corps were once again reassigned, now to the 43rd Army in the same Front. In a final move the division went to 103rd Rifle Corps in December, and it would continue under command of those two headquarters for the duration. In January 1945, 43rd Army was transferred to 3rd Belorussian Front, where it would remain until April, when it was finally assigned to 2nd Belorussian Front.

== Into Germany ==
With the rest of 3rd Belorussian Front, the 325th participated in the Vistula-Oder Offensive. 43rd Army was on the Front's right wing, and by January 22 had made a fighting advance of 23 km, pursuing the defeated German IX Army Corps on a broad front as its remnants attempted to retreat behind the Alle and Deime Rivers. By the end of the day the division, with the rest of the 103rd Corps, reached a line from Agilla to the Nemonin River; the Army's immediate goal was the town of Labiau. Fighting continued throughout the night. The fortified town was defended by units of the German 551st and 548th Volksgrenadier Divisions and put up a stubborn defense, making it impossible for the 103rd Corps to cross the Deime and attack the town from the east. However, the river was forced to the north and south by other units of 43rd Army; the defenders, facing encirclement, sought to escape, but were destroyed by arriving Soviet mobile units. By the end of the 23rd, Labiau had been occupied.

== Postwar ==
When the shooting stopped, the division had not had much time or occasion to distinguish itself, and was officially the 325th Rifle, Dvinsk Division (Russian: 325-я стрелковая Двинская дивизия). It was disbanded "in place" with the Northern Group of Forces during the summer of 1945.
