= 19th Tank Corps =

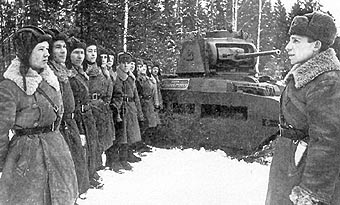
a Matilda tank, named Tank chetyrem geroyev, of the 182nd Tank Battalion, 202nd Tank Brigade, 19th Tank Corps, Central Front, in January 1943.

The 19th Perekop Red Banner Tank Corps was a tank corps of the Red Army during World War II.

Formed in December 1942, the corps saw its first action in the Sevsk–Dmitrovsk offensive in spring 1943. That summer it took part in the defensive phase of the Battle of Kursk and Operation Kutuzov.

== Formation and Sevsk–Dmitrovsk Offensive ==
The corps began its formation process on 24 December in the region of the railway station of Turdey, Tula Oblast. Major General Ivan Dmitriyevich Vasilyev took command on 5 January and led it for the majority of the rest of the war. The corps was initially assigned the 101st Tank Brigade, the 42nd and 43rd Tank Regiments, and the 19th Motor Rifle Brigade, but on 19 January the tank regiments, not having arrived, were replaced by the 79th and 202nd Tank Brigades. The 101st Tank Brigade was equipped with 51 American Lend-Lease M3 Lee medium tanks, while the 202nd included an assortment of tanks mainly gathered from training units: 22 KV and British Lend-Lease Matilda II tanks, and twenty T-60 light tanks. The 79th Tank Brigade rounded out the corps' tank units with twenty T-34 medium tanks and 26 T-60. The tank brigades possessed 65 percent of their authorized transport vehicles, while the 19th Motor Rifle Brigade lacked transport vehicles, its organic artillery and mortar battalions, and anti-tank rifle company. To address the 19th Motor Rifle Brigade's lack of vehicles, it was proposed to use horse transport instead, and 108 horses and 45 sledges were added to the brigade structure, but a lack of feed prevented this in practice. The brigade was given twenty vehicles without spare parts which were regularly inoperable as a result, and having been formed from ski battalions continued to move on skis. These four brigades remained with the corps for the rest of the war.

Not having completed its formation, on 19 January, the corps began a 400-kilometer march through Yefremov and Yelets to Livny. Reinforcements that did not reach the corps while it was forming partially arrived in the course of the march. The 79th and 202nd Tank Brigades did not arrive to the corps while it was forming and operated on their previous sectors of the front in the general direction of Livny, where they were slated to join with the remainder of the corps. The march was made difficult by the still insufficient cohesion of the tank crews, with many driver-mechanics having weak skills in the driving and maintenance of foreign tanks. The diversity of its tanks complicated maintenance and logistics, while blizzards hampered the movement of wheeled transport, light tanks, and Matildas, making the roads impassable. The corps was forced to employ locals in settlements along the march route to clear the snow off the road. With the movement taking place along one road and only at night, the movement of the corps was slow as it could cover only twenty to thirty kilometers each night. The 19th Motor Rifle Brigade suffered particular difficulties due to a lack of transport for provisions and fodder for horses and due to exhaustion about 600 men were left along the route.

The corps was left with two tank brigades when the 79th Tank Brigade was detached on 25 January. The corps proceeded its assigned concentration area in the region of Bolshoy Lyubash and Golovinka, 40 kilometers north of Fatezh, where on arrival on 13 February it was assigned to the Operational Group of Lieutenant General Yury Novoselsky of the Bryansk Front. On 11 February, a 30-strong M3 Lee tank battalion of the 101st Tank Brigade, arriving ahead of the rest of the corps, was committed to a mobile detachment that included a tank rider company and a motor rifle battalion. The detachment was tasked with rapidly advancing in cooperation with the group of Major General Pyotr Sobennikov and taking Kromy by the morning of 12 February. The detachment was to hold the town until the approach of the 211th Rifle Division, advancing from Cheremoshchnoye. At 16:30 on 11 February the mobile detachment arrived in the region of Verkhny Lyubazh and was joined by the battalion from the 101st Tank Brigade. On 12 February Novoselsky detached the 19th Motor Rifle Brigade from the corps and gave it its own mission to destroy the German grouping in the region of Vetryanka in cooperation with the 230th Rifle Division. Thus, on 12 February, the 19th Tank Corps only had one complete tank brigade, the 202nd Tank Brigade with one KV tank, nine Matildas, and thirteen T-60s.

By the time operations began in the Maloarkhangelsk Offensive, many tanks lagged behind, leaving the 19th Tank Corps with fifteen remaining M3 Lees from the 101st and the 202nd with two KV tanks, ten Matildas, and sixteen T-60s. A consolidated tank battalion from the 79th Tank Brigade with seven T-34s and eight T-60s returned to the corps, but five of the T-34s could only operate from stationary positions or on good roads, and deep snow made employing T-60s in mobile roles impossible. By the time combat operations began, the brigades had half of their wheeled transport, and eleven ChTZ tractors assigned for recovery. However only three tractors reached the concentration area and were unfit due to mechanical wear. The corps had 1.5 to two combat loads of ammunition, 1.5 to two refills of fuel, and up to six days of rations when it entered combat, aside from the 19th Motor Rifle Brigade which still lacked provisions and forage for its horses.

In the fighting between 14 and 20 February, the 101st Tank and 19th Motor Rifle Brigades, operating alongside the 280th and 211th Rifle Divisions, forced their German opponents to retreat to a new defensive line running through Lebedikha, Voronets, Morozikha, Trosna, Grankina, and Novy Svet. The 19th Motor Rifle Brigade took eight settlements, but lost up to 145 men in a failed attack on Gnilets, a result attributed to its lack of artillery and mortars. With the mobile group, the 101st Tank Brigade reached the northern outskirts of Shapelovo and Hill 248. The 19th Motor Rifle Brigade, and 79th and 101st Tank Brigades were returned to the corps by Order No. 19 of the front operational group.

Between 14 February and 19 March the corps took part in offensive and defensive battles in the Trosna region. The corps was shifted to the Central Front's 65th Army on 20 March, moving to the region of Lovlivy, Pochennoye, and Novy Svet. On 27 March the corps took defenses south of Sevsk. The corps was withdrawn to the 65th Army reserve in the region of Churilovsky, Krasny Klin, Pervaya Oktyabrsky on 5 April, and thence to the Central Front reserve on 23 April. While assigned to the latter in the region of Troitskoye, the corps received replacement tanks and vehicles while it conducted training. The 19th Motor Rifle Brigade was redesignated the 26th Motor Rifle Brigade by 10 June.

== Kursk ==
The corps was placed under the operational control of the 2nd Tank Army on 5 July, launching a counterattack towards Nikolskoye and Podolyan. On 8 July the corps was shifted to the 70th Army, fighting in defensive battles on the line of Olkhovatka, Molotychi, Soborovka, and Samodurovka. On 15 July, the corps and units of the 70th Army launcheda counterattack on the axis of Bobrik, and then on the axis of Sakovinka and Malaya Trosna. The corps was pulled out of action on 24 July and relocated by rail to the Kosterovo Tank Camp at Naro-Fominsk, where it was rebuilt in the Reserve of the Supreme High Command beginning on 20 August.

== On the Dnieper ==
On 19 September, the corps was dispatched by rail to the Southern Front. The corps unloaded at the stations of Volnovakha and Kuybyshevo, concentrating in the region of Chapayevka, Ulyanovsky, Tikhi Gai, and Konskiye Razdory by 27 September, placed in the front reserve. On 9 October, the corps took defensive positions on the line of Hill 121.9, Tifenbrunn, and Balka Solodka. Conducting a 120 kilometer march, the corps reached the region of Dachny, Tavrichesky, Lugovoy, and Otvazhny on 11 October, shifting to the operational control of the 51st Army on 12 October. The corps attacked in the Melitopol Offensive from 20 October, driving towards Tashchelak. The corps took jumping-off positions on 24 October, shifting to the operational control of the 28th Army and advancing on Darmshtadt, Cherkhograd, Novo-Nikolayevka, and Novo-Ivanovka. The corps reverted to the control of the 51st Army on 25 October. After regrouping, the corps advanced on Serogazy, Novaya Zavadovka, Chaplinka, and Armyansk from 28 October. On 9 November, the corps was withdrawn into the second echelon of the defenses of the 51st Army where it prepared defensive positions and restored its equipment. On 20 November the corps conducted a march to the region of Bolshaya Lepitikha, and from 25 November took part in failed attacks to eliminate the German Nikopol bridgehead. After the offensive ended, the corps concentrated in the region of Bolshaya Belozerka between 3 and 4 December. Assigned to the 51st Army, the corps attacked on the Kalinka axis in offensive battles from 19 December. The corps was pulled out of action on 4 January 1944, withdrawn to the 4th Ukrainian Front reserve in the region of Mikhaylovka.

== Crimean Offensive ==
Between 13 and 15 March, the corps marched to the region of Novo-Nikolayevka, Gromovka, and Voskresenovka. By 25 March its tanks crossed the Sivash. During the Crimean offensive, the corps attacked from the line of Baysary and sovkhoz Kirk-Ishun on the Dzhankoy, Simferopol, Zuya, Bakchisaraya, and Sapun-Gora axis. The corps was shifted to the operational control of the Separate Coastal Army on 19 April, and pulled out of action to the region of Komary on 24 April. Restoring its equipment strength until 7 May, the corps resumed the offensive on Cape Khersones on 9 May. The corps was withdrawn to the reserve of the 4th Ukrainian Front on 13 May. it was relocated by rail to the Tula Tank Camps between 5 and 18 June, remaining there to rebuild in the Reserve of the Supreme High Command until 12 July.

== Into the Baltics ==
The corps was relocated by rail to the 1st Baltic Front between 13 and 31 July. After unloading at the stations of Vitebsk and Polotsk, the corps marched 200 kilometers and on 4 August concentrated in the region of Panevezhis, under the operational control of the 43rd Army. The corps attacked from the region of Stepanovka, Bobolishiki, and Dambitse towards Birzhai and Radvilishkis on 5 August. The corps was pulled out of action on 11 August to the region of Boltati, Smilgan, and Trishkai. The corps was shifted to the operational control of the 6th Guards Army on 14 August, and on 15 August attacked towards Kalni and Yuglas. The corps was pulled out of action again on 16 August and marched to the region of Ionishkis, where it concentrated on 18 August.

The corps was shifted to the 51st Army, attacking towards Dobele and Tukums on 20 August. The 19th Tank Corps regrouped in the Auce region on 23 August and conducted defensive battles on the line of Murdeni, Skarve, Vetskalen, Kali, and subsequently in the regions of Zhagarts and Auce. The corps defended the latter region from 13 September, shifting to the 6th Guards Army. The corps was withdrawn from action on 27 September and marched 150 kilometers to concentrate in the Makinai region on 1 October. The corps was committed to the breakthrough in the general direction of Trishyai and Seda on 4 October. The corps reached the region of Vaynode and Priekule on 10 October. There, it repulsed German attacks together with the 6th Guards Army between 11 October and 5 November. The corps was withdrawn from the 6th Guards army on 5 November and conducting a 180 kilometer march without its equipment, concentrated in the Mitava region by 12 November, where it was placed in the reserve of the 2nd Baltic Front. The corps was received new tanks and conducted training in the Mitava region until 22 December.

== Courland Pocket ==
The corps attacked as part of the front's 22nd Army on 23 December in the region of Dzhuksta and Auce, south of Tukums. The corps was withdrawn from action by the morning of 29 December and concentrated in the region of Katyny and Dibelyas. On the night of 6–7 November, the corps conducted a 90 kilometer march, concentrating in the region of Vaychi, Vaynode, and Ergli, where it was placed under the control of the 6th Guards Army. Subsequently, the corps took waiting positions in the region of Putnys, Abelnieki, and Klyavi. The corps attacked from the forest north and south of Prekules and Asmte in a group of infantry support tanks with the 30th Guards Rifle Corps in another drive against the Courland Pocket. The corps' advance on Sluturi and Vidsmuykha was unsuccessful. The corps was placed in the reserve of the 6th Guards Army on 27 February, but on 28 February it was pulled back to the front reserve in the Vaynode region, where it conducted training. The corps was withdrawn to the Reserve of the Supreme High Command on 5 April and relocated to Romania by rail to Călugăreni, Comana, and Vlad Țepeș, 25 to 30 kilometers south of Bucharest. The 19th Tank Corps finished concentrating there on 18 April and began training and rebuilding.

== Postwar ==
After the end of the war, the corps was reorganized as a tank division in June 1945. The division was disbanded after return from Romania to Odesa in the Odesa Military District in February 1947.
