= Sivakov =

Sivakov or Sivakow is a Slavic masculine surname, its feminine counterpart is Sivakova or Sivakowa. It may refer to

- Ivan Sivakov (1901–1944), Soviet general
- Mikhail Sivakow (born 1988), Belarusian football player
- Pavel Sivakov (born 1997), Russian cyclist
- Tamara Sivakova (born 1965), Belarusian Paralympic athlete
