= Ivan Sivakov =

Soviet major general (1901–1944)

Ivan Prokofievich Sivakov
- Sivakov, c. 1944
- Born: 2 June 1901; Ivanovka, Orenburgsky Uyezd, Orenburg Governorate, Russian Empire
- Died: 20 July 1944 (aged 43)
- Allegiance: Russian SFSR; Soviet Union
- Branch: Red Army
- Service years: 1919–1944
- Rank: Major general
- Commands: 23rd Rifle Division (became 71st Guards Rifle Division)
- Conflicts: Russian Civil War; World War II †
- Awards: Hero of the Soviet Union; Order of Lenin; Order of the Red Banner (2); Order of Kutuzov, 2nd class; Order of the Red Star

Ivan Prokofievich Sivakov (Russian: Иван Прокофьевич Сиваков; 2 June 1901 – 20 July 1944) was a Red Army major general and a posthumous Hero of the Soviet Union.

== Early life and Russian Civil War ==
Born in the village of Ivanovka, Ivanovsky volost, Orenburgsky Uyezd, Orenburg Governorate on 2 June 1901 to a Russian peasant family, Ivan Prokofievich Sivakov completed fourth grade and worked in the village. During the Russian Civil War, he was mobilized into the Red Army on 10 September 1919 and sent to the 5th Reserve Regiment, becoming a member of the Communist Party during the same year. Sivakov was sent to study at the 26th Orenburg Red Commanders' Infantry Course in March 1920. With a cadet detachment from the course, he fought in the suppression of Sapozhkov's revolt in Saratov Governorate. Upon his completion of the course in May 1921, Sivakov was appointed a platoon commander in the 78th Battalion of the 52nd Rifle Brigade of the Cheka Troops, stationed at Arkhangelsk.

== Interwar period ==
From June 1921 Sivakov served as a platoon commander in the 155th and then the 136th Rifle Regiments and a month later simultaneously became the chief of the Nyonoksa sector of the White Sea coast defenses. Transferred to serve as a platoon commander in the 46th Rifle Regiment of the 16th Rifle Division at Gatchina in June 1922, Sivakov began studies at the special faculty of the 8th Infantry School in Petrograd in September of that year. After his graduation in September 1924 he was sent to the 84th Rifle Regiment of the 28th Rifle Division of the North Caucasus Military District as a platoon commander. With the regiment, Sivakov participated in the disarmament and elimination of anti-Soviet guerrillas in Chechnya and Ingushetia between 27 August and 2 October 1925, and in similar operations in Dagestan from 27 August to 26 September 1926. In November 1926 he became a course commander and cadet company commander at the Vladikavkaz Infantry School. With the forces of the school he fought in the suppression of revolts in Kabardino-Balkaria between May and June 1928 and February and March 1930.

Sivakov transferred to the 37th Rifle Regiment of the 13th Rifle Division at Kamensk in December 1931, serving as head and politruk of the regimental school and later as a battalion commander. After completing the Vystrel course between December 1936 and July 1937, he was appointed chief of staff of the 280th Rifle Regiment of the 81st Rifle Division of the Belorussian Military District, which was soon transferred to the Kiev Military District. From July 1938 he served as the deputy head of the 6th department of the Red Army Command and Staff Directorate. Sivakov became head of the 2nd Kharkov Reserve Commanders' Improvement Course in February 1940 and in November of that year took command of the 594th Reserve Rifle Regiment in the Kharkov Military District. In March 1941 he became commander of the 776th Rifle Regiment of the 214th Rifle Division, forming in the district.

== World War II ==
After the German invasion of the Soviet Union, Operation Barbarossa, began on 22 June 1941, Sivakov and his division were sent to the Western Front in July. There, they fought in the Battle of Smolensk as part of the 22nd Army near Velikiye Luki and Andreapol. In September the 214th was relocated to the Yartsevo sector, joining the 16th Army. After the early October German attack in Operation Typhoon broke through the front, the division was shifted to the right flank of the army north of Svishchevo, where it defended in the area of Kaprovshchina and Dedovo. Subsequently, the division retreated to the Dnieper and farther to Bogoroditskoye southwest of Vyazma as part of the group led by deputy front commander Lieutenant General Stepan Kalinin. The remnants of the division were combined into consolidated detachments on 14 October and headed northeast out of the Vyazma pocket north of Gzhatsk. Sivakov, by now a colonel, led the lead detachment, which broke out through the corridor along the Vyazma highway. Wounded near Kamenets on 19 October, he and the other wounded separated from the main detachment. Sivakov led the group to Soviet lines in the sector of the 316th Rifle Division on 23 October and spent several months in the hospital for treatment of his wound.

After recovering, Sivakov was appointed commander of the 15th Separate Rifle Brigade, forming in the North Caucasus Military District, in January 1942. The brigade arrived on the Northwestern Front in March, but on 6 April the front military tribunal sentenced him to ten years in the Gulag on charges of abuse of power, with execution of the sentence postponed until the end of the war. In May he was appointed commander of the 117th Rifle Regiment of the 23rd Rifle Division, part of the 53rd Army. For his leadership of the unit, the sentence was lifted on 18 July, before the division was sent to fight in the Battle of Stalingrad in August. Until November the 23rd defended in the area of Novogrigoryevskaya first with the Stalingrad Front and then with the Don Front. Sivakov became deputy division commander in November and on 11 December acting division commander. In the Soviet counteroffensive at Stalingrad, the division fought in battles for Dmitriyevka, Bolshaya Rossoshka, Gorodishche, and the Barrikady Factory. Sivakov resumed his position as division deputy commander in January, and on 1 March the 23rd was converted into the 71st Guards Rifle Division in recognition of its contributions during the Battle of Stalingrad.

After the end of the Battle of Stalingrad in February, the division defended against the German counterattack during the Third Battle of Kharkov as part of the 21st Army (renamed the 6th Guards Army on 16 April) of the Central Front. Sivakov became acting division commander again in April and led it in the Battle of Kursk and the Belgorod-Kharkov Offensive as part of the 6th Guards Army of the Voronezh Front. He was promoted to major general on 15 September. The division was relocated to the 2nd Baltic Front in October, where it fought in the Nevel sector. Hospitalized from 12 January, Sivakov returned to command of the 71st Guards as part of the 1st Baltic Front in June. He led it in the Vitebsk–Orsha Offensive, the Polotsk Offensive, and the Šiauliai Offensive during Operation Bagration in the summer of 1944. The division captured Shumilino on 23 June and cut the highway and railroad between Polotsk and Vitebsk. Crossing the Western Dvina on the next day, the division went on to capture Beshankovichy and rapidly advance to the Polotsk region. For his leadership of the division, Sivakov was recommended for award of the title Hero of the Soviet Union and the Order of Lenin. During the Šiauliai Offensive, he was killed in action during the battle for Daugavpils on 20 July, two days before his Hero of the Soviet Union title and Order of Lenin decoration were awarded. Sivakov was buried in the military cemetery on Uspenskaya Gora in Vitebsk, where a street is named for him.
