= Vasily Rakovsky =

Soviet Army major general

Vasily Stepanovich Rakovsky
- Born: 1 January 1898; Plavna, Brakhlovskoy volost, Novozybkovsky Uyezd, Chernigov Governorate, Russian Empire
- Died: 7 January 1978 (aged 80) Solnechnogorsk, Moscow Oblast, Soviet Union
- Allegiance: Russian Empire; White movement; Russian SFSR; Soviet Union
- Branch: Imperial Russian Army; Russian Army (1919); Red Army (later Soviet Army)
- Service years: February–November 1917; August–December 1918; 1919–1957
- Rank: Major general
- Commands: 167th Rifle Division
- Conflicts: World War I; Russian Civil War; World War II
- Awards: Order of Lenin; Order of the Red Banner (3); Order of the Red Star

Vasily Stepanovich Rakovsky (Russian: Васи́лий Степа́нович Рако́вский; 1 January 1898 – 7 January 1978) was a Soviet Army major general.

Drafted into the Imperial Russian Army during World War I, Rakovsky briefly served as a non-commissioned officer without seeing action in 1917 before the dissolution of the army and was conscripted by the White forces in Siberia during the Russian Civil War, deserting to the Red Army. Decorated for his actions as a junior commander, he served at a military school during much of the 1930s and became commander of the 167th Rifle Division as the Red Army expanded before Operation Barbarossa. Rakovsky led the division in a temporarily successful counterattack during the Battle of Smolensk, and managed to lead a small group from his command out of encirclement several weeks later. His division disbanded due to its losses, Rakovsky was given command of the 53rd Separate Rifle Brigade in late 1941, leading it with the 2nd Shock Army in the first days of the January 1942 Lyuban Offensive. Relieved of command in the same month, he headed a military school for the rest of the war. Postwar, he served on the faculty of the Vystrel course before retiring in the late 1950s.

== Early life, World War I, and Russian Civil War ==
An ethnic Russian, Rakovsky was born on 1 January 1898 in the village of Plavna, Brakhlovskoy volost, Novozybkovsky Uyezd, Chernigov Governorate. During World War I, he was mobilized for service in the Imperial Russian Army on 13 February 1917 and sent to the training detachment of the 28th Siberian Rifle Regiment in Omsk. After graduation with the rank of junior unter-ofitser, Rakovsky served with the regiment for one and a half months. The regiment was disbanded after the October Revolution in November, and following his demobilization Rakovsky went to Barnaulsky Uyezd of Tomsk Governorate, where he worked as a miner.

During the Russian Civil War, he was conscripted into the White army of Alexander Kolchak on 13 August 1918 while at Kamen and sent to Novonikolayevsk to serve with the Nikolayevsk Reserve Regiment. After deserting on 28 December, Rakovsky joined the Red Army at the beginning of January 1919, serving with the 1st Separate Glazov Battalion of the 3rd Army of the Eastern Front, with which he fought in the battles against the army of Kolchak. Wounded near Perm in March, he was evacuated to a hospital. Upon his recovery, Rakovsky entered the eight-month command course in Samara. Two weeks later, he was sent with the courses to the Southern Front to fight against the White Armed Forces of South Russia in the area of Millerovo and Voronezh. For their "courage in battle", the course was awarded the Order of the Red Banner, returning to Samara in early July.

After graduating in May 1920, Rakovsky became a platoon commander in the 458th Rifle Regiment of the 51st Rifle Division. With the latter, he was sent to the Southern Front during July to fight against the Army of Wrangel. As a company commander and acting battalion commander, Rakovsky fought on the Kakhovka bridgehead and in the Perekop–Chongar Offensive, receiving the Order of the Red Banner for his actions in the latter, which defeated the Army of Wrangel in Crimea. After the end of the fighting in Crimea, the regiment fought against Ukrainian People's Army insurgents in Podolian Governorate.

== Interwar period ==
After the end of the Russian Civil War, Rakovsky served with the 51st Rifle Division as an assistant company commander in the 459th Rifle Regiment, and from April 1922 as assistant company commander and company commander in the 153rd Rifle Regiment. He completed a chemical course at Kharkov in 1923 and passed an external examination of the military normal school at the Kiev Infantry School in 1926, studying at the Vystrel course between October 1927 and August 1928. Rakovsky completed a course for mobilization work of the Ukrainian Military District headquarters in 1930, and in October of that year transferred to the Odessa Red Army Commanders' Infantry School in October 1930, where he served as a tactics instructor and as chief of staff and commander of a student battalion.

He was appointed assistant commander for drill units of the 138th Rifle Regiment of the 46th Rifle Division of the Kiev Military District in January 1937. From December of that year he commanded the 45th and then the 351st Rifle Regiments of the 15th Rifle Division at Kherson. Now a colonel, Rakovsky was appointed assistant commander of the 95th Rifle Division of the Kiev Special Military District at Kotovsk in February 1939. He became commander of the 20th Reserve Rifle Brigade of the Volga Military District at Saratov in January 1940, later transferring to command the 19th Reserve Rifle Brigade at the same location. He became commander of the 167th Rifle Division, then forming at Balashov, on 16 July of that year, with the rank of Kombrig. Just before the beginning of Operation Barbarossa, the June 1941 German invasion of the Soviet Union, the division became part of the 63rd Rifle Corps.

== World War II ==
After the beginning of Operation Barbarossa, the division and its corps were sent to the front, joining the 21st Army of the Reserve of the High Command (Stavka reserve). From 28 June, Rakovsky led the 167th in defense of positions between Rogachev and Zhlobin. During the Battle of Smolensk the division repulsed German attempts to cross the Dnieper. Launching a counterattack, it advanced to the line of the Drut River and remained there until 12 August, when it was withdrawn to the army reserve. For "successful attacks" towards Bobruisk Rakovsky was promoted to major general on 31 July. Relocated to the area of Dovsk, the division defended the latter as part of the 67th Rifle Corps, fighting in encirclement from 13 August. Due to its loss of contact with the 67th Rifle Corps, the 167th returned to the control of the 63rd Rifle Corps from 14 August.

In the encirclement, Rakovsky decided to destroy heavy weapons and ordered the division to escape in groups. He led a group of 25 others out of the encirclement with their weapons in the sector of the 155th Rifle Division of the Bryansk Front on 18 September; about 2,500 men of the division escaped the encirclement. The units that escaped encirclement were disbanded and their men used to reinforce other units, and Rakovsky was appointed assistant deputy commander of the Bryansk Front by 15 October, then placed at the disposal of the Main Personnel Directorate of the People's Commissariat of Defense.

Appointed commander of the 53rd Separate Rifle Brigade of the 26th Army (redesignated as the 2nd Shock Army in late December) in Stavka reserve in November, Rakovsky led the brigade in the Lyuban Offensive Operation from 7 January. Ten days later, he was relieved of command for "not fulfilling orders and tolerating heavy losses", being again placed at the disposal of the Main Personnel Directorate. Rakovsky never held a combat command again and in February was appointed head of the 2nd Leningrad Infantry School, evacuated to Glazov, where he spent the rest of the war.

== Postwar ==
Postwar, between October 1945 and March 1946, Rakovsky was again placed at the disposal of the Main Personnel Directorate, then sent to become an instructor at the Vystrel course at Solnechnogorsk. There, he served as head of a class, senior tactics instructor, head of the 5th class, and head of a special department for the training of foreign military personnel, before his retirement on 7 January 1957. Rakovsky lived in Solnechnogorsk, where he died on 7 January 1978.

== Awards ==
Rakovsky was a recipient of the following decorations:

- Order of Lenin
- Order of the Red Banner (3)
- Order of the Red Star
