= Leonid Petrovsky =

Soviet lieutenant general (1897–1941)

Leonid Grigorevich Petrovsky
- Born: 11 June 1897; Shcherbinovka, Bakhmutsky Uyezd, Yekaterinoslav Governorate, Russian Empire
- Died: 17 August 1941 (aged 44) Staraya Rudnya, Zhlobin District, Byelorussian Soviet Socialist Republic, Soviet Union
- Allegiance: Soviet Union
- Service years: 1918–1938, 1940–1941
- Rank: Lieutenant general
- Commands: 6th Rifle Division; 1st Guards Motor Rifle Division; Central Asian Military District; 63rd Rifle Corps
- Conflicts: World War I; Russian Civil War; World War II; Operation Barbarossa

Leonid Grigorevich Petrovsky (11 June 1897 – 17 August 1941) was a Soviet lieutenant general. He was the oldest son of Grigory Petrovsky. He was born in what is now Donetsk Oblast in Ukraine. He was promoted to Komkor from Komdiv in 1937. While in command of forces in Central Asia, he was removed from command and expelled from the army. He was not executed like many of his colleagues. In 1940, he was reinstated in the army. He was a recipient of the Order of the Red Banner, the Order of the Red Star and the Order of the Patriotic War. Less than a month after his death, his younger brother, Peter was executed on September 11, despite a request from his father for his release.

== World War II ==
After the German invasion of the Soviet Union, Operation Barbarossa, began on 22 June 1941, the 63rd Rifle Corps was rushed to the front as part of the 21st Army of the Western Front, and fought in the defense of eastern Belarus against the German advance. On 6 July, the 63rd's 117th Rifle Division attacked across the Dnieper at night in what was planned as a reconnaissance-in-force. However, the attack surprised the XXIV Motorized Corps' 10th Motorized Division, and pushed the German troops back to the Bobruisk-Rogachev road. During the Battle of Smolensk, Petrovsky used his corps to temporarily halt the German advance in the Rogachev area, one of the first successful Soviet counterattacks of the war. The 13 July counterattack across the Dnieper penetrated 8–10 kilometers into the defenses of the LIII Army Corps' 52nd and 255th Infantry Division, and captured Rogachev and Zhlobin. However, its success was fleeting, as the 63rd's advance was soon halted, and within a week, Rogachev and Zhlobin had fallen to the German troops again.

On 26 July, the army and the 63rd Corps were transferred to the new Central Front. In mid-August, troops from the German 2nd Army and 2nd Panzer Group attacked south from Rogachev towards the 21st Army positions around Gomel, encircling and destroying most of the army. Army commander Vasily Gordov requested that the 63rd Corps be allowed to withdraw to Gomel, but Stalin refused. Around this time, he was given command of the 21st Army, but as a result of the combat situation Petrovsky was unable to assume command. While attempting to break out of the pocket, Petrovsky was killed while defending positions in the village of Staraya Rudnya. Grigoriy Plaskov would later recall the circumstances of Petrovsky's death in his memoirs:

On August 17 at 0300, the signal for attack was given. In the first ranks of the attackers was the corps commander. Inspired by the personal example of the commanders, the units moved forward. And the Nazis, unable to withstand the onslaught, retreated. Having repulsed all the German counterattacks and expanding the breakthrough, Petrovsky led the main forces of the corps to the southwest. Meanwhile, in the forest, east of the Khalch station, the 154th division fought the most intense battles with the Nazis, who sought to cut off our units of the escape route. The division not only covered the rear and flank of the retreating corps, but also managed to break through the enemy ring in this area. Petrovsky hurried here to help build on the success. Commander of the 154th division, General Ya. S. Fokanov and [and] other comrades dissuaded Leonid Grigorievich from doing this, advised him to follow the main forces. But he was adamant: "I have nothing to do here, the worst is over." Staying with the covering units, Petrovsky fearlessly led them into battle. He was a man of great willpower and great energy. He was always seen in the most decisive places.

In an uncommon action for the Eastern Front, he was buried with full military honors by German troops and a cross was erected over his grave with an inscription announcing his bravery.

== Bibliography ==
=== Bibliography ===
- Glantz, David M. (2010). Barbarossa Derailed: The German Advance to Smolensk, the Encirclement Battle, and the First and Second Soviet Counteroffensives, 10 July – 24 August 1941. Philadelphia: Casemate. ISBN 9781906033729.
- Maslov, Aleksander A. (1998). Fallen Soviet Generals: Soviet General Officers Killed in Battle, 1941–1945. Translated by David Glantz. London: Frank Cass. ISBN 9780714647906.
- Melnikov, Vladimir Mikhailovich. (2013). На днепровском рубеже. Тайна гибели генерала Петровского. Moscow: Veche. (Военные тайны ХХ века). ISBN 978-5-4444-0114-9.
- Vozhakin, M.G., ed. (2006). Великая Отечественная. Комкоры. Военный биографический словарь [The Great Patriotic War: Corps Commanders: Military Biographical Dictionary] (in Russian). Vol. 1. Moscow: Kuchkovo Pole. pp. 430–432. ISBN 5901679083.
- Письмо наркома обороны Маршала Советского Союза С. К. Тимошенко И. В. Сталину от 08.06.1940 г. No. 376с. Экз. No. 2.

Military offices
| Unknown | Commander of the 6th Rifle Division; 1928–1930 | Succeeded by Vladimir Kachalov |
| Preceded by Raphael Khmelnitsky | Commander of the 1st Moscow Rifle Division; 1934–1937 | Succeeded by Vasily Morozov |
| Preceded by Aleksandr Loktionov | Commander of the Central Asian Military District; 1937–1938 | Succeeded by Iosif Apanasenko |
| Preceded by Vasily Sergatskov | Commander of the 63rd Rifle Corps; November 1940–August 1941 | Succeeded by Office disbanded |
