= 90th Guards Rifle Division =

90th Guards Rifle Division (April 18, 1943 – 1946) 26th Guards Mechanized Division (1946 – 1957) 38th Guards Tank Division (1957 – 1965) 90th Guards Tank Division (1965 – 1985)
- Colonel (later Major General) V. G. Chernov
- Active: 1941 – 1985
- Country: Soviet Union
- Branch: Red Army, Soviet Army
- Type: Infantry (former), Armored
- Engagements: World War II; Battle of Kursk; Belgorod-Khar'kov Offensive Operation; Operation Bagration; Baltic Offensive; Vistula-Oder Offensive; East Prussian Offensive
- Decorations: Order of the Red Banner
- Battle honours: Vitebsk; Novgorod

Commanders
- Notable commanders: Col. Viktor Georgievich Chernov; Maj. Gen. Vasilii Efimovich Vlasov

The 90th Guards Rifle Vitebsk Division was an infantry division of the Red Army during World War II. Formed from the 325th Rifle Division in recognition of its actions during the winter of 1943, the division fought in the Battle of Kursk, the Belgorod-Khar'kov Offensive Operation, Operation Bagration, the Baltic Offensive, the Vistula–Oder Offensive, and the East Prussian Offensive.

== Formation ==
The division was formed on April 18, 1943, by the re-designation of the first formation of the 325th Rifle Division, which had distinguished itself in the advance of 21st Army in Central Front in the late winter of that year. At about the same time, 21st Army became the 6th Guards Army. When formed, the order of battle of the 90th Guards was as follows:

- 268th Guards Rifle Regiment, from 1092nd Rifle Regiment
- 272nd Guards Rifle Regiment, from 1094th Rifle Regiment
- 274th Guards Rifle Regiment, from 1096th Rifle Regiment
- 193rd Guards Artillery Regiment, from 893rd Artillery Regiment

It was one of the first units assigned to the new 22nd Guards Rifle Corps, and Maj. Gen. Nikolai Boleslavovich Ibianskii was moved from command of the division to command of the corps on the same day. He was replaced in command of the division by Col. Viktor Georgievich Chernov. This officer would continue in command until September 12.

== Battle of Kursk ==
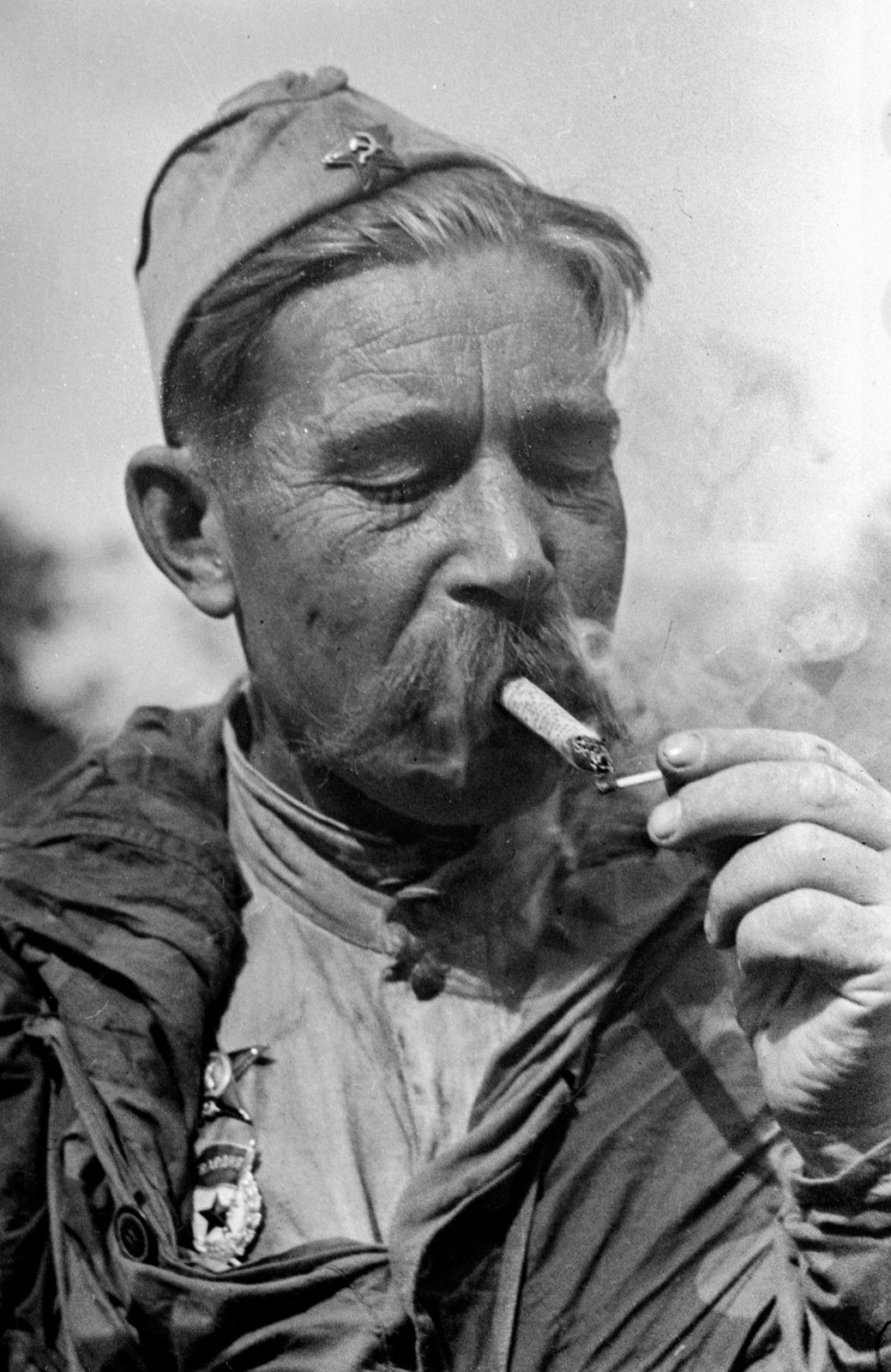
Division scout Senior Sergeant Aleksey Grigoryevich Frolchenko lights a cigarette during a lull in the fighting on the Belgorod axis, August 1943

As the Battle of Kursk began on July 5, 1943, 6th Guards Army was in Voronezh Front, defending the south side of the salient, and 90th Guards was in the second echelon of its Army, dug in behind the swampy basin of the Pena River to defend the most likely German axis of attack towards Oboyan. After the first day's fighting, during which XXXXVIII Panzer Corps and part of II SS Panzer Corps had damaged and forced back the Army's first echelon, Gen. N.F. Vatutin, the Front commander, ordered the 1st Tank Army to support the second echelon. Overnight, 6th Tank Corps buttressed the left and center of the division, while 3rd Mechanized Corps also moved up in support. These reinforcements were important, because the 90th Guards had started the battle understrength, having yielded a rifle battalion and part of its artillery to the first echelon.

By nightfall on July 6, elements of the first echelon (52nd and 67th Guards Rifle Divisions) had been encircled and were forced to slip out through gaps in the German lines, at considerable cost. The Germans attempted to continue their attack, but were frustrated by the stubborn resistance of the 90th Guards in the strongpoints of Zavidovka, Lukhanino, and Syrtsevo, all in the basin of the Pena, with the support of the two corps of the tank army; 6th Tank in particular inflicted significant damage on a tank group of 3rd Panzer Division in Zavidovka, forcing it to abandon the village and retreat. By the afternoon of the 9th it was becoming clear that the German forces were re-directing their offensive away from the road to Oboyan in favor of a more easterly route. 90th Guards and 10th Motorized Brigade at Lukhanino and Shepelevka were coming under more intense attacks as the Germans tried to outflank 6th Tank. By the end of July 11, XXXXVIII Panzer Corps, in intense fighting, forced the ad hoc Group Getman (6th Tank, most of 3rd Mechanized, and 90th Guards) out of the area of the Psel River bend and partially encircled it. As the eastern re-direction continued, the reinforced 6th Guards Army was ordered to make a frontal counterattack with practically its full strength on July 12. The division, along with the rest of 22nd Guards Corps, was to make the main attack from the Chapaev - Novenkoe - Kruglik line along the Syrtsevo - Yakovlevo axis. The goal of this attack was to hold the German forces in place and prevent them from massing more strength at Prokhorovka. In the event, the attack did significant damage to the German 332nd Infantry Division, which was caught regrouping, and recaptured Chapaev, but realized few other positive results.

== Advance ==
Following the German offensive, the division required a short period of rebuilding before taking part in the Belgorod-Khar'kov Offensive Operation in August - September. On August 13 it took part in an attack on the 3rd SS Panzer Division, along with the 52nd Guards Rifle Division and 6th Tank Corps. 3rd SS had deployed virtually all of its forces north of the Merchyk River, leaving only its reconnaissance battalion to screen south of it. The combined Soviet force pushed through the German light armor, recaptured Vysokopolye and linked up with 49th Tank Brigade, which had been isolated in this area the previous day. However, a renewed attack by 3rd and 2nd SS on the following days damaged the tank corps and retook the village, although the Germans believed they had done more damage than was, in fact, the case.

Later that month 90th Guards was moved to the Reserve of the Supreme High Command. On September 13, Col. Vasilii Efimovich Vlasov (promoted to Major General June 3, 1944) took command of the division, a post he held into the postwar. In October, 90th Guards was moved north with 6th Guards Army to the 2nd Baltic Front, entering positions northwest of Nevel. Less than a month later the division was reassigned to 4th Shock Army in the 1st Baltic Front; it continued to serve in this Front throughout 1944, in 4th Shock and back into 6th Guards Army, as well as periods in reserve.

On November 10 the division was in the first echelon of 22nd Guards Rifle Corps as it launched an attack to try to cut off the German salient northeast of Nevel in conjunction with 3rd Shock Army. The forward progress was painfully slow, gaining only 600 – 700 metres on the first day. This effort was soon shut down.

At the start of Operation Bagration, the division was back in 22nd Guards Rifle Corps (as its only actual Guards division) in 6th Guards Army. That army had been moved in secrecy into the line north of the German-held Vitebsk salient over three nights previous to the attack. On the second day of the offensive the 90th Guards, along with its corps, advanced 7 km, clearing the series of lakes and rivers defended by the Germans; by the end of the day 1st Tank Corps was advancing through wide gaps in those defenses. Late on June 24, 6th Guards Army reached the Western Dvina River but did not immediately break through the enemy holding that line. On that same day, farther east, Soviet forces completed the encirclement of the Vitebsk salient. On June 27, as 6th Guards Army victoriously advanced to the west, it was held up at Obol; the division and its corps secured the town by the end of the day. On June 30, 22nd Guards Corps was on the rail line from Dvinsk to Polotsk, and on the following day reached the eastern edge of Polotsk, a vital rail center. Over the next three days the division fought to secure this city against desperate enemy resistance, and the massive gap between Army Groups North and Center grew wider. In recognition of its service in these actions, the 90th Guards Rifle Division was awarded the name "Vitebsk" as an honorific:

"VITEBSK" - ...90th Guards Rifle Division (Major General Vlasov, Vasily Yefimovich)... The troops who participated in the liberation of Vitebsk, by order of the Supreme High Command on 26 June 1944, and a commendation in Moscow, are to be given a salute of 20 artillery salvoes from 224 guns.

The division was further recognized on July 23 with the award of the Order of the Red Banner for its role in the liberation of Polotsk.

As the Baltic Offensive developed, 90th Guards advanced westward as far as the town of Sharkovshchina around July 8. By the end of the month, the division was back in 4th Shock Army and had assisted in the takeover of the city of Panevezhys in Lithuania. In mid-September it was fighting in the vicinity of Birzhai, still in 4th Shock; by early October it had reached the Shiauliai area and was back in 6th Guards Army.

In February, 1945, during the East Prussian Offensive, the division was assigned to 14th Rifle Corps in 3rd Belorussian Front, striking through eastern Pomerania to the Baltic coast of Germany. On Mar. 1, it was merged with the 378th Rifle Division. The 90th Guards Rifle Division thus inherited the 378th's honorific "Novgorod" and its Order of the Red Banner. On May 1 it was still in 14th Rifle Corps, immediately subordinate to 2nd Belorussian Front. In that same month it was designated as part of the occupation forces for the German portion of Poland; at this time the men and women of the division shared the full title 90th Guards Rifle, Vitebsk - Novgorod, twice Order of the Red Banner Division. (Russian: 90-я гвардейская стрелковая Витебско-Новгородская дважды Краснознамённая дивизия).

== Postwar ==
In the summer of 1946, it became one of the new mechanised divisions and was then designated the 26th Guards Mechanised Division. In 1957, it again was re-designated, this time as the 38th Guards Tank Division, which held until 1965 when it went back to the 90th Guards Tank Division. In an exchange of numbers, the 6th Guards Motor Rifle Division in Germany in 1985 became the 90th Guards Tank Division, while the 90th Guards Tank Division became the 6th Guards Motor Rifle Division.
