= Pyotr Koshevoy =

Soviet military commander and Marshal of the Soviet Union

- Koshevoy after 1968
- Born: 21 December [O.S. 8 December] 1904; Oleksandriia, Kherson Governorate, Russian Empire (now Ukraine)
- Died: 30 August 1976 (aged 71); Moscow, Russian SFSR, Soviet Union
- Burial place: Novodevichy Cemetery
- Military career
- Allegiance: Russian SFSR; Soviet Union
- Service years: 1920–1969
- Rank: Marshal of the Soviet Union
- Commands: 6th Guards Army; 5th Army; 11th Guards Army; Siberian Military District; Kiev Military District; Group of Soviet Forces in Germany
- Conflicts: Russian Civil War; World War II
- Awards: Hero of the Soviet Union (twice); Order of Lenin (5); Complete list

Signature
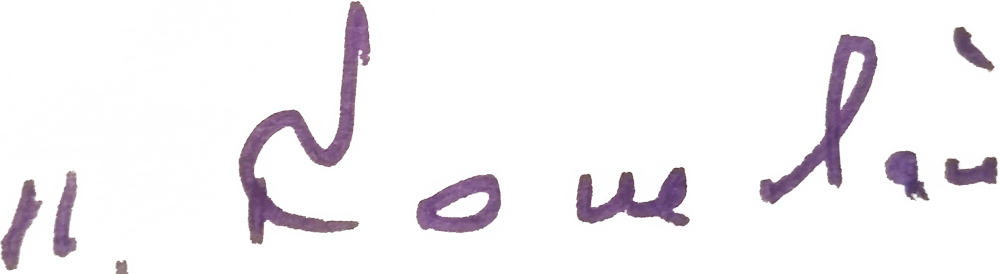

Pyotr Kirillovich Koshevoy (Ukrainian: Петро Кирилович Кошовий; Russian: Пётр Кириллович Кошевой; 21 December [O.S. 8 December] 1904 – 30 August 1976) was a Soviet military commander and a Marshal of the Soviet Union.

Koshevoy was born to a Ukrainian peasant family and joined the Red Army in 1920, fighting in the Russian Civil War. During the interwar period, he served as a junior commander in cavalry units and held staff positions from the late 1930s. By the beginning of Operation Barbarossa, the German invasion of the Soviet Union, Koshevoy commanded the 65th Rifle Division, which he led during the Siege of Leningrad. In mid-1942 he transferred to command the 24th Guards Rifle Division, fighting in the Battle of Stalingrad and the North Caucasus.

Koshevoy commanded the 63rd Rifle Corps during the Crimean Offensive, then transferred to command the 71st Rifle Corps before leading the 36th Guards Rifle Corps from early 1945, commanding it in the East Prussian Offensive. He was awarded the title of Hero of the Soviet Union twice – in 1944, for the taking of Mount Sapun during the Crimean Offensive and in 1945, for his part in the capture of Königsberg.

Following the war, Koshevoy commanded the 6th Guards, the 5th, the 11th Guards Armies, and the Siberian and Kiev Military Districts. He became commander-in-chief of the Group of Soviet Forces in Germany in 1965. Koshevoy was promoted to Marshal of the Soviet Union in 1968, but was dismissed from command of the Group of Soviet Forces in Germany in late 1969.

== Early life, Russian Civil War, and interwar period ==
Koshevoy was born on 21 December [O.S. 8 December] 1904 in Oleksandriia, Kherson Governorate to a Ukrainian peasant family. After graduating from primary school in 1919, he worked with his father, a miller, for a year and a half. He joined the Red Army during the Russian Civil War on 13 February 1920 and was sent to the 2nd Red Cossack Regiment of the 8th Red Cossack Cavalry Division, with which he fought on the Southwestern Front against Polish and Ukrainian People's Army troops in the area of Chornyi Ostriv, Lityn, Proskurov, Horodok, and Rohatyn, then against the Revolutionary Insurrectionary Army of Ukraine.

After the end of the war, in August 1922, Koshevoy was sent to study at the Crimean Cavalry Courses, and upon graduation in October 1923 was appointed a squadron starshina in the 3rd Red Cossack Cavalry Regiment of the 1st Red Cossack Cavalry Division, stationed in the Ukrainian Military District. Becoming a kursant at the Ukrainian Cavalry School in August 1924, after graduation in September 1927 he served as a platoon commander with the 61st Cavalry Regiment of the Special Cavalry Brigade in the Moscow Military District. Temporarily transferred to the department of higher education institutions at the district headquarters to serve as officer for assignments of the 2nd category in November 1931, Koshevoy then served at the VTsIK Combined Military School as an assistant machine gun squadron commander.

After attending the Armored Commanders' Advanced Training Courses (KUKS) in Leningrad between March and May 1932, he returned to the school to briefly become a platoon commander in the mechanized battalion. From September of that year, Koshevoy served as head of the regimental school of the 61st Regiment, part of the Special Cavalry Division (formed from the Special Cavalry Brigade). He became assistant chief of the 1st (operations) section of the staff of the regiment in May 1935, and from October of that year was regimental chief of staff. Koshevoy entered the Frunze Military Academy in May 1936 and upon graduation in January 1939 was appointed chief of staff of the 15th Cavalry Division, stationed in the Transbaikal Military District. He was transferred to command the 65th Rifle Division of the district in February 1940. Koshevoy was assigned the rank of colonel on 29 February when the Red Army adopted personal military ranks.

== World War II ==
After Operation Barbarossa, the German invasion of the Soviet Union, began in June 1941, Koshevoy remained with the division in the Transbaikal Military District. Under his command, the 65th was relocated to the Volkhov Front during November, and as part of the 4th Army fought in the Tikhvin Defensive Operation. For its "successful actions" in the latter, the 65th was awarded the Order of the Red Banner. Transferred to command the 24th Guards Rifle Division in the reserve on 2 July 1942, Koshevoy led the division as part of the 8th Army from 7 August, fighting in the Sinyavino Offensive. He was promoted to major general on 1 October. The division was relocated to Rasskazovo on 25 October 1942, where it joined the 2nd Guards Army of the Reserve of the Supreme High Command, receiving replacements and new equipment. Departing with the army in mid-December for the Stalingrad Front, it fought in the repulse of Operation Winter Storm, a German counterattack attempting to relieve surrounded troops in Stalingrad. As part of the Southern Front, the division fought in the Rostov Offensive, part of the North Caucasus Strategic Offensive in early 1943. It was in reserve in Voroshilovgrad oblast for rebuilding from March. During the summer, as part of the 2nd Guards Army of the Southern Front, Koshevoy led the division in the Mius and Donbass Offensives.

During the Donbass Offensive, Koshevoy was appointed commander of the 63rd Rifle Corps of the 51st Army on 28 August. He went on to lead the corps as part of the 44th and 51st Armies of the 4th Ukrainian Front in the Melitopol and Crimean Offensives, during which it captured Kakhovka, Simferopol, and Sevastopol. For his "skillful leadership" of the corps in the Crimean Offensive, including in the crossing of the Sivash and the taking of Mount Sapun, Koshevoy was made a Hero of the Soviet Union and awarded the Order of Lenin on 16 May 1944, being promoted to lieutenant general a day later. Transferred to command the 71st Rifle Corps on 27 May, he led the latter as part of the 31st Army of the 3rd Belorussian Front in Operation Bagration and the Baltic Offensive. For its "courage in battle", the 71st was awarded the Order of the Red Banner. Koshevoy transferred to command the 36th Guards Rifle Corps of the 11th Guards Army from 7 January 1945, leading it for the rest of the war. During the East Prussian Offensive, the corps captured Insterburg, Königsberg, and Pillau. During the offensive, according to his superiors, Koshevoy personally organized the attacks of the corps and led from the front, in the "most critical and dangerous" areas of Insterburg. For his "skillful leadership" in the offensive, "courage and heroism", he received the title Hero of the Soviet Union a second time on 19 April.

== Postwar ==
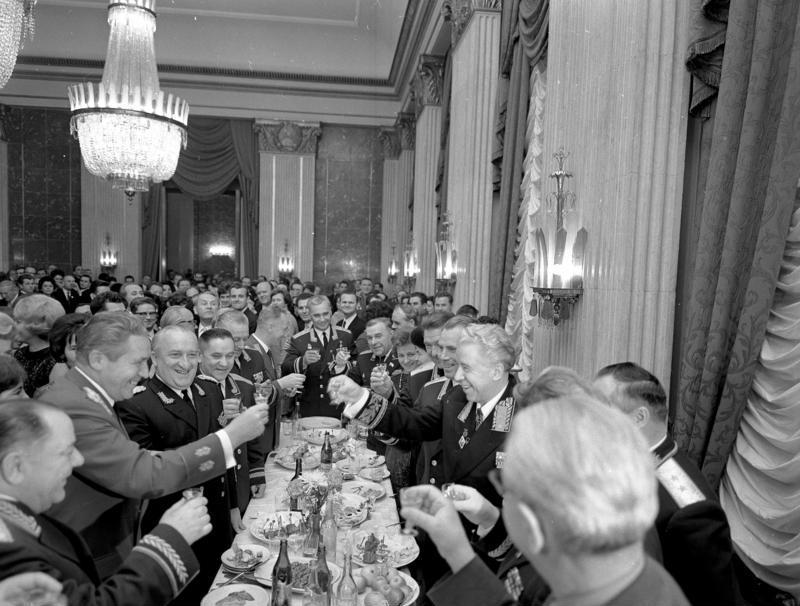
Koshevoy (front left) at a reception at the Soviet embassy in Berlin, 1967

After the end of the war, Koshevoy continued to command the corps. He commanded the 6th Guards Army in the Baltic Military District from July 1946, and studied at the Higher Academic Courses of the Voroshilov Higher Military Academy from March 1947 to April 1948. Upon completion of the courses, he was appointed commander of the 5th Army of the Primorsky Military District, which became part of the Far Eastern Military District in April 1953. Promoted to colonel general on 31 May 1954, Koshevoy was transferred to command the 11th Guards Army in the Baltic Military District in June 1954 and became first deputy commander-in-chief of the Group of Soviet Forces in Germany (GSFG) in July 1955. He commanded the Siberian Military District from July 1957 and the Kiev Military District from April 1960, being promoted to army general on 13 April 1964. Koshevoy became commander-in-chief of the GSFG in January 1965. Although promoted to Marshal of the Soviet Union on 15 April 1968, he was transferred to the Group of Inspectors General of the Ministry of Defense as an inspector general in October 1969, a retirement post for aging senior officers. Koshevoy lived in Moscow, where he died on 30 August 1976. He was buried in the Novodevichy Cemetery. His memoirs of his World War II service, In the war years (Russian: В годы военные), were published in 1978 by Voenizdat.

== Honors and awards ==
Koshevoy was a recipient of the following awards and decorations:

- Hero of the Soviet Union, twice (16 May 1944, 19 April 1945)
- Five Orders of Lenin (17 December 1941, 16 May 1944, 30 April 1945, 9 December 1964, 22 February 1968)
- Order of the October Revolution (4 December 1974)
- Order of the Red Banner, three times (3 November 1944, 15 November 1950, 21 February 1969)
- Order of Bogdan Khmelnitsky, 1st class (5 May 1945)
- Order of Suvorov, 2nd class (31 March 1943)
- Order of Kutuzov, 2nd class, twice (17 September 1943, 4 July 1944)
- Eleven campaign and jubilee medals
- Ten foreign orders and medals

Koshevoy was a candidate member of the Central Committee of the Communist Party of the Soviet Union between 1961 and 1971, and a sixth and seventh convocation delegate of the Supreme Soviet of the Soviet Union.

A bronze bust of Koshevoy was installed in Oleksandriia. In 1976, the Omsk Tank School was named in his honor.
