= 23rd Rifle Division =

- Active: I Formation: 1922–1943 II Formation: 1943–1945 III Formation: 1955–1957
- Country: Soviet Union
- Branch: Red Army
- Type: Infantry
- Size: Division
- Engagements: World War II: Soviet invasion of Poland; Soviet occupation of Latvia; Baltic Operation; Toropets–Kholm Offensive; Battle of Stalingrad; Battle of Kiev (1943); Operation Bagration; Riga Offensive (1944); Vistula-Oder Offensive; East Pomeranian Offensive; Berlin Offensive
- Decorations: Order of Lenin (1st formation) Order of the Red Banner (1st and 2nd formations); Order of Suvorov (2nd formation) Order of Kutuzov (2nd formation)
- Battle honours: Kiev (2nd formation); Zhitomir (2nd formation)

Commanders
- Notable commanders: Mikhail Fedorovich Lukin Ivan Sivakov; Alexander Ignatievich Korolev; Sergey Andryushchenko; Ivan Basteyev Alexander Seregin

The 23rd Rifle Division was an infantry division of the Red Army and Soviet Army, formed three times.

It was formed in July 1922 in the Ukrainian Soviet Socialist Republic, inheriting the Order of the Red Banner from the predecessor Zavolzhskaya Rifle Brigade. On 23 May 1932 the division was awarded the Order of Lenin for helping to construct the Kharkov Tractor Factory. On 1 March 1943 it became the 71st Guards Rifle Division for its actions in the Battle of Stalingrad.

The division was reformed on 2 May 1943 on the bаsе of the 7th Rifle and 76th Naval Infantry Brigades in the Steppe Military District. The division was awarded the Order of the Red Banner, the Order of Suvorov 2nd class, and the Order of Kutuzov 2nd class for its actions. The division also received the honorifics "Kiev" and "Zhitomir". The division was disbanded "in place" by Stavka Directive No. 11095 of 29 May 1945, creating the Group of Soviet Forces in Germany.

It was reformed in 1955 by redesignation of the 198th Rifle Division at Biysk. On 25 June 1957 the 95th Motor Rifle Division was formed in Biysk, Altay Kray, Siberian Military District, from the 23rd Rifle Division. It was disbanded on 1 March 1959.
