= Arkady Chepelev =

Red army sergeant

Arkady Yegorovich Chepelev
- Аркадий Егорович Чепелев
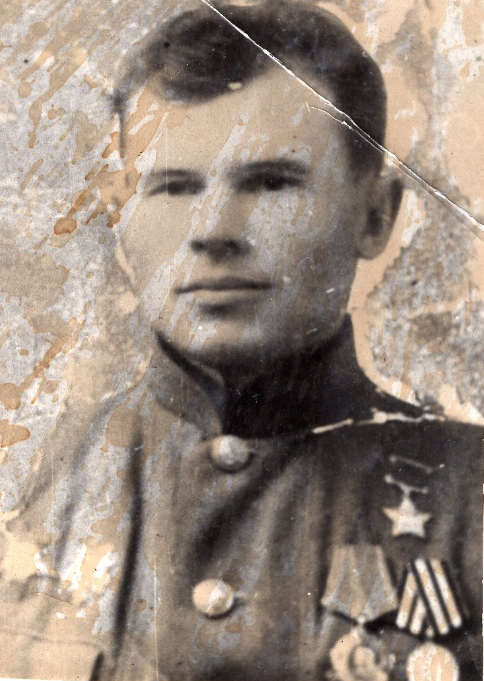
- Born: 24 January 1915; Tamlyk village, Voronezhsky Uyezd, Voronezh Governorate, Russian Empire
- Died: 31 July 1985 (aged 70); Voronezh, Voronezh Oblast, Russian SFSR, Soviet Union
- Military career
- Allegiance: Soviet Union
- Branch: Red Army
- Service years: 1941–1945
- Rank: Starshina/Sergeant Major
- Unit: 167th Rifle Division
- Conflicts: World War II; Battle of the Dnieper
- Awards: Hero of the Soviet Union

Arkady Yegorovich Chepelev (Russian: Аркадий Егорович Чепелев; 24 January 1915 – 31 July 1985) was a Red Army Starshina or sergeant major and Hero of the Soviet Union. He was awarded the title for ferrying weapons and ammunition to troops in the Dnieper bridgehead and repelling counterattacks during the Battle of the Dnieper. Chepelev continued to fight in combat and served with the 167th Rifle Division during the Lvov–Sandomierz Offensive and Battle of the Dukla Pass, among others. He was demobilized postwar and returned to Voronezh, working as a mechanic in an aircraft factory.

== Early life ==
Chepelev was born on 24 January 1915 in the village of Tamlyk in Voronezh Governorate to a peasant family. After he completed four years of primary school, Chepelev's family moved to Voronezh. Chepelev then worked at a factory there.

== World War II ==
In April 1942, Chepelev was drafted into the Red Army. He was sent to the 180th Separate Sapper Battalion of the 167th Rifle Division in April 1943. The division fought in the Battle of Kursk.

By September 1943, he was a senior sergeant commanding a sapper squad in the battalion. On 12 September, he was awarded the Order of the Red Star. He fought in the Battle of the Dnieper. On 26 September, Chepelev and his squad cleared lanes in German minefields near Vyshhorod, enabling the advance of infantry units. During the subsequent crossing of the Dnieper, Chepelev reportedly made several trips on a raft, ferrying weapons and ammunition to troops on the west bank. Chepelev's squad reportedly built an improvised rowboat and ferried two artillery guns and an infantry battalion across the river. On 3 November, Chepelev helped repulse German counterattacks on the bridgehead.

On 10 January 1944, Chepelev was awarded the title Hero of the Soviet Union and the Order of Lenin. He joined the Communist Party of the Soviet Union in 1944. Chepelev continued to fight with the 167th Rifle Division. In the summer, he fought in the Lvov–Sandomierz Offensive. During the fall, he participated in the Battle of the Dukla Pass. On 8 December, he was awarded the Order of the Patriotic War 2nd class. In January 1945, he fought in the Western Carpathian Offensive. During April, he fought in the Moravian-Ostrava Offensive.

== Postwar ==
After the end of the war in 1945, Chepelev demobilized with the rank of sergeant major or Starshina and returned to Voronezh. He worked as a factory mechanic at the Voronezh Aircraft Production Association. On 11 March 1985, he was awarded the Order of the Patriotic War 1st class on the 40th anniversary of the end of World War II. Chepelev died on 31 July 1985 and was buried in the city's Southwestern Cemetery.
