= 167th Rifle Division =

- Active: 1941 (1st formation); 1942–1946 (2nd formation)
- Country: Soviet Union
- Branch: Red Army
- Type: Infantry
- Engagements: World War II; Operation Barbarossa; Battle of Smolensk; Battle of the Dnieper
- Decorations: Order of the Red Banner (2) (2nd formation)
- Battle honours: Sumy (2nd formation); Kiev (2nd formation)

The 167th Rifle Division was an infantry division of the Red Army of the Soviet Union, formed twice.

== History ==
=== First Formation ===
The division was formed at Balashov in the Volga Military District in July 1940, under the command of Kombrig Vasily Rakovsky. Just before the beginning of Operation Barbarossa, the June 1941 German invasion of the Soviet Union, the division became part of the 63rd Rifle Corps. After the beginning of Operation Barbarossa, the division and its corps were sent to the front, joining the 21st Army of the Reserve of the High Command (Stavka reserve). From 28 June, the 167th fought in defense of positions between Rogachev and Zhlobin. During the Battle of Smolensk the division repulsed German attempts to cross the Dnieper. Launching a counterattack, it advanced to the line of the Drut River and remained there until 12 August, when it was withdrawn to the army reserve. Relocated to the area of Dovsk, the division defended the latter as part of the 67th Rifle Corps, fighting in encirclement from 13 August. Due to its loss of contact with the 67th Rifle Corps, the 167th returned to the control of the 63rd Rifle Corps from 14 August. In the encirclement, Rakovsky decided to destroy heavy weapons and ordered the division to escape in groups. He led a group of 25 others out of the encirclement with their weapons in the sector of the 155th Rifle Division of the Bryansk Front on 18 September; about 2,500 men of the division escaped the encirclement. The units that escaped encirclement were disbanded and their men used to reinforce other units.

=== Second Formation ===
On 16 December 1941, the 438th Rifle Division was formed in the Ural Military District. On 23 January 1942, it became the 167th Rifle Division (Second Formation). The division was recreated at Ssucho Lug in February 1942 and fought near Bryansk and at Kursk. The division fought in the Battle of the Dnieper. Division personnel Major Fyodor Bruy, Junior lieutenant Alexander Bondarev, Sergeant major Arkady Chepelev, Senior sergeant Alexey Gabrusev, Sergeant Andrian Zhuravlev and Private Dmitry Yemelyanov, among others, were awarded the title Hero of the Soviet Union for their actions during the battle. The division fought in the Carpathians and in Hungary. The division was with the 1st Guards Army of the 4th Ukrainian Front in May 1945. The division ended the war with the honorifics "Sumy-Kiev Twice Red Banner". Postwar, the division moved to Chortkov with the 107th Rifle Corps, part of the 38th Army in the Carpathian Military District. The division and its corps were disbanded in May 1946.
