= Butovo, Belgorod Oblast =

Butovo Бутово
- Selo
- Location within Belgorod Oblast Location within Russia
- Coordinates: 50°45′N 36°10′E
- Country: Russia
- Region: Belgorod Oblast
- District: Yakovlevsky District
- Time zone: UTC+3:00

Butovo (Russian: Бутово) is a rural locality (a selo) and the administrative center of Butovskoye Rural Settlement, Yakovlevsky District, Belgorod Oblast, Russia. The population was 947 as of 2010. There are 12 streets.

== Geography ==
Butovo is located 34 km west of Stroitel (the district's administrative centre) by road. Cherkasskoye is the nearest rural locality.
