= 63rd Rifle Corps =

- Active: 1st formation: 1939–1941; 2nd formation: 1943–1957
- Country: Soviet Union
- Branch: Red Army (Soviet Army from 1946)
- Engagements: World War II

Commanders
- Notable commanders: Leonid Petrovsky (1st formation); Pyotr Koshevoy (2nd formation)

The 63rd Rifle Corps was a corps of the Red Army during World War II, formed twice.

== First formation ==
The corps headquarters was first formed during September 1939 in the Volga Military District. It was part of the 21st Army in June 1941, with the 53rd, 148th, and 167th Rifle Divisions on 22 June, under the command of Lieutenant General Leonid Petrovsky. The corps headquarters was disbanded on 23 August as the Red Army eliminated most corps headquarters.

== Second formation ==
The corps was reformed in mid-1943. Major General Tikhon Butorin briefly commanded it in early August, followed by Major General Dmitry Stankevsky for a few days. Major General Pyotr Koshevoy, promoted to lieutenant general on 17 May 1944, commanded the corps from late August to late May 1944. He was replaced by Major General Fyodor Bakunin, who commanded the corps for the rest of the war except for a brief period in April 1945, when he was replaced by Colonel Anatoly Nekrasov.

In 1954 the corps was in the Ural Military District and it controlled the 77th Rifle Division (Sverdlovsk) and 417th Rifle Division at Chebarkul. On 4 June 1957 it was redesignated as the 63rd Army Corps, but was disbanded by the early 1960s.
