= Zavidovka =

Zavidovka Завидовка
- Selo
- Location within Belgorod Oblast Location within Russia
- Coordinates: 50°51′N 36°08′E
- Country: Russia
- Region: Belgorod Oblast
- District: Yakovlevsky District
- Time zone: UTC+3:00

Zavidovka (Russian: Завидовка) is a rural locality (a selo) and the administrative center of Zavidovskoye Rural Settlement, Yakovlevsky District, Belgorod Oblast, Russia. The population was 571 as of 2010. There are 5 streets.

== Geography ==
Zavidovka is located 38 km northwest of Stroitel (the district's administrative centre) by road. Rakovo is the nearest rural locality.
