= Novogrigoryevskaya =

Novogrigoryevskaya Новогригорьевская
- Stanitsa
- Location within Volgograd Oblast Location within Russia
- Coordinates: 49°25′N 43°38′E
- Country: Russia
- Region: Volgograd Oblast
- District: Ilovlinsky District
- Time zone: UTC+4:00

Novogrigoryevskaya (Russian: Новогригорьевская) is a rural locality (a stanitsa) and the administrative center of Novogrigoryevskoye Rural Settlement, Ilovlinsky District, Volgograd Oblast, Russia. The population was 736 as of 2010. There are 20 streets.

== Geography ==
Novogrigoryevskaya is located in steppe, on the right bank of the Don River, 40 km northwest of Ilovlya (the district's administrative centre) by road. Viltov is the nearest rural locality.
