= Mount Sapun =

Ridge near Sevastopol, Crimea

Coordinates: 44.552879°N 33.583403°E

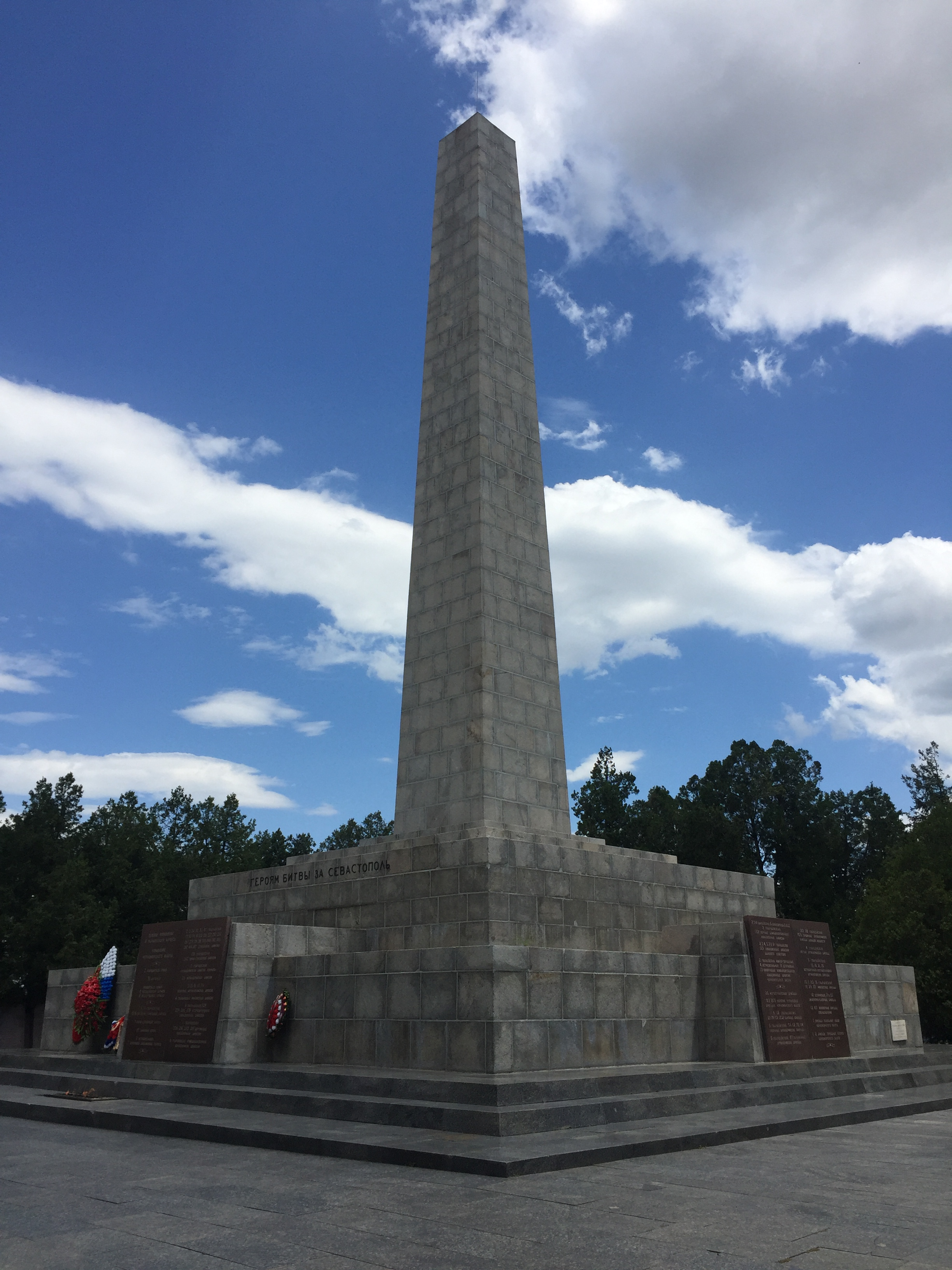
- Obelisk of Glory to Soviet Warriors on Mount Sapun

Geography

Immovable Monument of National Significance of Ukraine
- Official name: Меморіальний комплекс "Сапун-гора" (Mount Sapun memorial complex)
- Type: History
- Reference no.: 270009-Н

Mount Sapun or Sapun Ridge (Russian: Сапун-Гора; Ukrainian: Сапун-гора; Crimean Tatar: Sapun dağı, Сапун дагъы) is a 240 m high ridge to the southeast of Sevastopol, situated on the Crimean peninsula, occupied by Russia.

== History ==
It became the site of heavy fighting during the siege of Sevastopol (1941-1942), and also during its liberation in 1944.

When defending Sevastopol the Soviet troops held the Sapun Ridge and could observe German movements to the city from the south.It took Wehrmacht nearly 2 weeks of heavy fighting to take control over these positions in late June 1942. As a consequence, Soviet troops had to evacuate from Crimea.

In 2 years, on the final stage of the Crimean Offensive the assault of Sapun-gora on 7 May 1944 was successful for Red Army. On 9 May 1944, just over one month after the start of the battle, Sevastopol fell. German forces were evacuated from Sevastopol to Constanța.

Later in 1944 the first monuments to the Soviet warriors on this place were erected, in 1959 the diorama showing the assault of the German fortifications was opened.

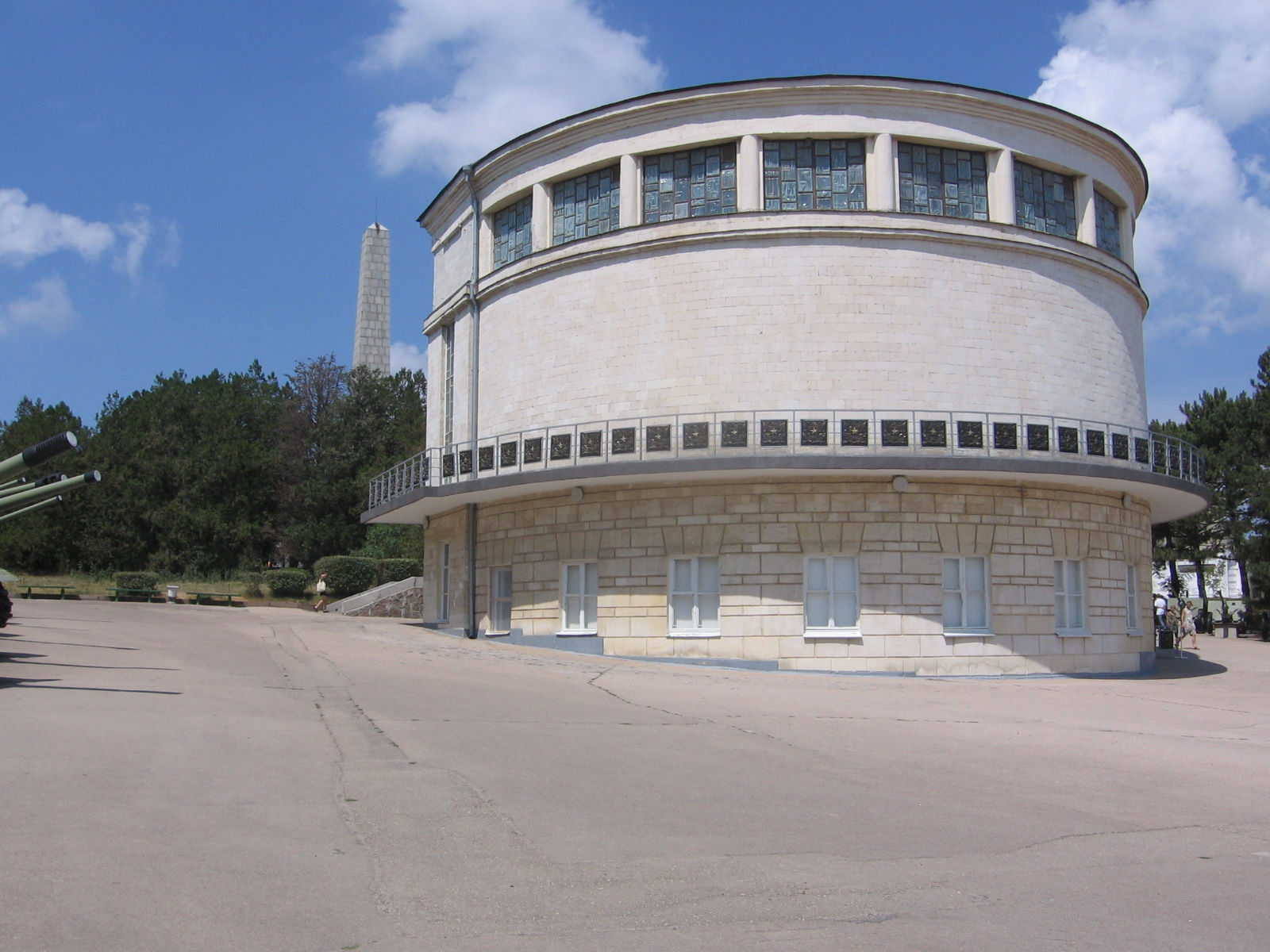
Building of the diorama Storm of Mount Sapun
