= 6th Guards Army =

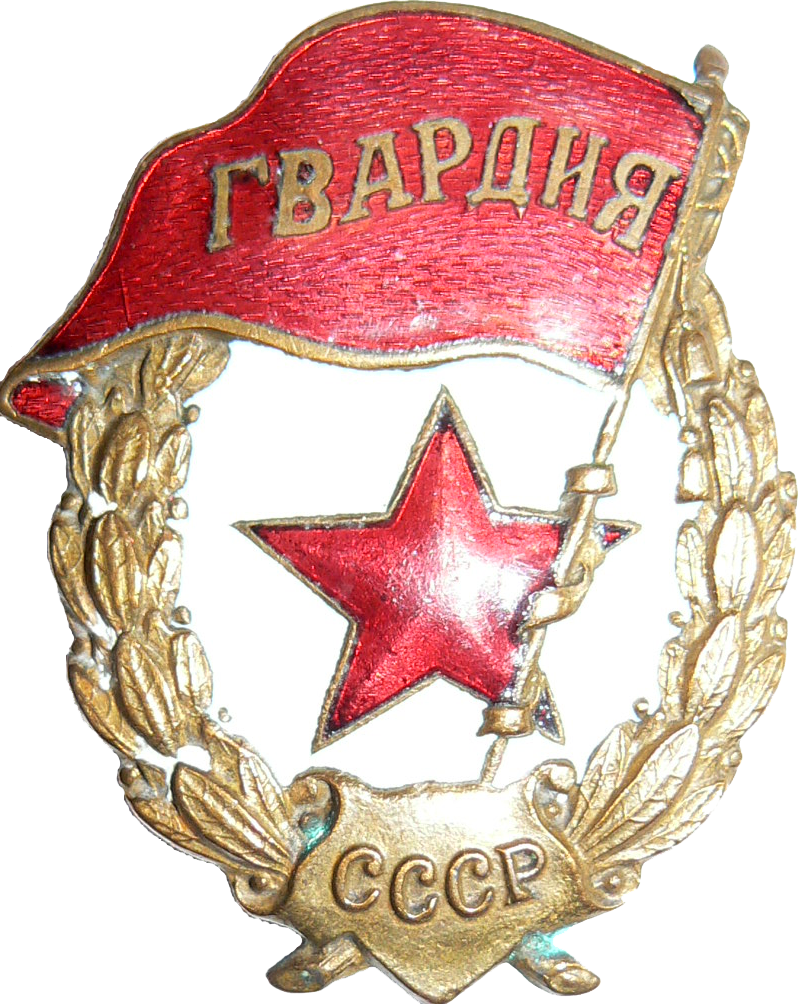
- Soviet Guards insignia
- Active: 1943–1947
- Country: Soviet Union
- Branch: Red Army
- Type: Field Army
- Engagements: World War II; Battle of Kursk; Belgorod-Kharkov Offensive; Operation Bagration; Courland Pocket

Commanders
- Notable commanders: Ivan Chistyakov; Ivan Grishin; Pyotr Koshevoy

The 6th Guards Army was a Soviet Guards formation which fought against Nazi Germany during World War II under the command of General Ivan Chistyakov. The Army's chief of staff was General Valentin Antonovich Penkovskii.

The 6th Guards Army was formed on 16 April 1943 from the 21st Army and fought under command of the Voronezh, 1st Baltic, 2nd Baltic, and Leningrad Fronts from 1943 until the end of the war. In 1943, the army fought in the Battle of Kursk. During the summer of 1944, the army fought in Operation Bagration, the Polotsk Offensive, the Šiauliai Offensive and the Riga Offensive. During the Battle of Memel, the army helped drive German troops into what became the Courland Pocket. The 6th Guards Army was one of the Soviet formations committed to besieging German Army Group Kurland in the Courland Peninsula. This was a lengthy operation that continued until the Germans in Courland surrendered on May 12, 1945. Postwar, the army was stationed in the Baltic region until its disbandment in 1947.

== History ==
=== May to September 1943 ===
The 6th Guards Army was formed on 1 May 1943 in accordance with the Stavka directive of 16 April 1943 from the 21st Army.

By May 1943 the forces of 6th Guards Army, subordinated to Voronezh Front, were in well-entrenched positions in the southern sector of the Kursk Salient south of Oboyan. Here the Army faced the forces of the German Fourth Panzer Army. During May and June both sides prepared for the impending German summer offensive against the Kursk Salient (Operation Citadel), a salient into the German lines that had been secured by Soviet forces in the spring of that year. By early July, 6th Guards Army consisted of the 22nd Guards Rifle Corps (67th Guards Rifle Division, 71st Guards Rifle Division, and 90th Guards Rifle Division), and the 23rd Guards Rifle Corps (51st Guards Rifle Division, 52nd Guards Rifle Division, and 375th Rifle Division), as well as the army-controlled 89th Guards Rifle Division and the 96th Tank Brigade. It also included the 230th and 245th Separate Tank Regiments, 27th and 33rd Artillery Brigades, 60th Separate Armored Train Division, 1440th Self-Propelled Artillery Regiment, 628th Artillery Regiment, 27th and 28th Anti-Tank Artillery Brigades, 293rd and 295th Mortar Regiments, the 5th, 16th, 79th and 314th Guards Mortar Regiments. The army also included the 26th Anti-Aircraft Artillery Division, which included the 1352nd, 1357th, 1363rd and 1369th Anti-Aircraft Artillery Regiments. The 1487th Anti-Aircraft Artillery Regiment was an independent unit. Anti-Tank Artillery Regiments were the 493rd, 496th, 611th, 694th, 868th, 1008th, 1240th, 1666th and 1667th. The 205th and 540th Separate Engineer Battalions provided engineering capabilities for the army. Additionally the Army had been heavily reinforced with artillery and anti-tank guns, and 6th Guards Army's defensive positions were heavily mined.

On 4 July both sides engaged in an artillery duel and Fourth Panzer Army began probing attacks but the main offensive by Fourth Panzer Army's two panzer corps began on the morning of 5 July. The main weight of Fourth Panzer Army's western corps fell on 67th Guards Rifle Division but the division, though suffering heavy losses, only gave ground slowly. On 67th Guards Rifle Division's right, 71st Guards Rifle Division was driven back more than five kilometres, but Fourth Panzer Army did not have the resources to fully exploit this success on its left flank. The main weight of Fourth Panzer Army's eastern corps fell on 52nd Guards Rifle Division. This division was driven back 10 kilometres on the first day, but German commanders were nonetheless disappointed at the rate of progress of their assault forces.

Voronezh Front command had, on the afternoon of 5 July, begun to move armoured forces forward to support 6 Guards Army. The main reinforcement came from 1st Tank Army. By the morning of 6 July the battered 67th Guards Rifle Division had been withdrawn north to defensive positions on the Psel River and Vorenezh Front had taken the decision to use 1 Tank Army defensively. Over the next 48 hours, despite the commitment of more Soviet reserves, including armour, the German penetration north towards Oboyan continued, and the defences of 51st Guards Rifle Division, part of 6th Guards Army's second echelon, had been shattered. The offensive by Fourth Panzer Army continued through 8 July and by 9 July the panzers had advanced close to Chistiakov's headquarters forcing him to withdraw further north, leaving Penkovskii at Kochetovka with a forward battle headquarters attempting to maintain contact with the Army's divisions. By that evening Chistiakov had managed to establish a new defensive line for his Army, but German forces had by then advanced to within 20 kilometres of Oboyan.

After 9 July, though the German effort against 6th Guards Army and 1st Tank Army on the direct route to Oboyan continued, these attacks were diversionary in nature since the German command had decided to direct its main effort further to the northeast off 6th Guards Army's left flank towards the village of Prokhorovka. Soviet High Command and Voronezh Front Headquarters were aware of this diversion of German effort and, in addition to deploying further armoured reserves to the Prokhorovka area, began a series of counter-attacks against Fourth Panzer Army's penetration towards Oboyan.

By the third week of July, after the failure of the German strategic effort against the Kursk salient had become apparent, and in response to Soviet offensives towards Orel and in the southern Ukraine, German forces south of Oboyan began to pull back to the positions they had occupied at the beginning of the month in order to release forces for deployment elsewhere.

Soviet High Command planned to respond with a major offensive against German positions northwest of Belgorod, the offensive to begin early in August. Elements of four combined-arms armies were to be concentrated into a 30 kilometre sector to achieve the initial breakthrough, for which 6th Guards Army would be employed on the right wing; and two tank armies would be available to exploit any breakthrough in order to develop the offensive south towards Kharkov.

The offensive began on 3 August with a massive artillery barrage. By the end of the first day the German 167th Infantry Division defending a sector of the frontline northeast of Tomarovka had been largely shattered by 6th Guards Army's attack and a gap had been opened in the German line. Over the subsequent few days the Soviet tank armies were committed and the offensive was expanded to include additional Soviet armies on the flanks of the initial offensive. On 11 August elements of 6th Guards Army, advancing south with 1 Tank Army, were held by German forces for six days at Bogodukov 30 kilometres northwest of Kharkov.

By the third week of August Soviet armies east of Bogodukov had begun to encircle Kharkov from the west and south, and off 6th Guards Army's other flank Soviet armies were advancing far to the west of Akhtyrka. These advances left 6th Guards Army on a somewhat secondary sector of the frontline. At the end of September Chistiakov's army was withdrawn from Voronezh Front into the High Command Reserve.

=== October 1943 to May 1944 ===
On 15 October 1943, 6th Guards Army was assigned to 2nd Baltic Front which was about to participate in an offensive, in conjunction with 1st Baltic Front further south, to break through the German lines in the Nevel area in order to threaten the flanks of the German Sixteenth Army to the north and the German Third Panzer Army to the south. Chistiakov's forces, still based on 22nd and 23rd Rifle Corps and with seven rifle divisions, was not involved in the initial attack, which commenced on 28 October, and which four days later broke through the German lines, but they were committed to exploit this breakthrough as part of the southern wing of 2nd Baltic Front in order to turn the flank of Sixteenth Army. In fighting that went on into the middle of December, German forces successfully constrained any widening of the breakthrough corridor by the two Baltic Fronts, but they were unable to close the gap between their two armies further west. Yet the two Baltic fronts lacked the mechanised forces that would have enabled them to exploit the penetration in depth, and instead they continued to attack the flanks of the two German armies, with 6th Guards Army and 3rd Shock Army attempting to cut the Pustoshka – Novosokolniki railway. By the end of the year German forces had been able to close the gap in their lines and had stabilised the frontline around what had become the Nevel Bulge. During February 1944, in a sector of the frontline that had developed into a positional stalemate north of Vitebsk, 6th Guards Army was assigned from the command of 2nd Baltic Front to that of 1st Baltic Front.

=== June to October 1944 ===
The major Soviet summer offensive of 1944 (Operation Bagration) was to be conducted on the central axis in order to achieve the liberation of Belorussia (Belarus). As part of the opening phase of this offensive the German fortress of Vitebsk was to be encircled by the southern wing of 1st Baltic Front and the northern wing of 3rd Belorussian Front in order that a deep penetration could be made behind the left flank of the German Army Group Centre. Occupying the central sector of 1st Baltic Front's lines, 6th Guards Army had been strengthened to nine rifle divisions under three corps headquarters, and for the initial breakthrough phase, Chistiakov was assigned two artillery divisions. The opening offensive by 1st Baltic Front on 22 June was concentrated against a 20 kilometre sector of the frontline held by the German Third Panzer Army. A rapid breakthrough was achieved and by the next day forces from 6th Guards Army's 23 Guards Rifle Corps had taken Sirotino. By 24 June Chistiakov's forces were across the Dvina River deep behind Third Panzer Army's left flank, and, having broken through the German lines on the extreme left flank of Army Group Centre, they were able to advance west along the left bank of the river against virtually no opposition. The gap into which 6th Guards Army was advancing between the extreme left flank of Army Group Centre and the extreme right flank of Army Group North became known as the Baltic Gap. On 28 June Lieutenant-General Chistiakov was promoted to the rank of Colonel-General. Six days later, on 4 July, three divisions from the German Sixteenth Army attempted to close the Baltic Gap in an attack against 6th Guards Army west of Disna, but Chistiakov was able to block this attack, and his forces continued to advance along the left bank of the river towards Daugavpils. However, by the second week of July, 6th Guards Army's westward advance had begun to slow against increasing German opposition in increasingly difficult terrain. On 25 July Chistiakov's offensive towards Daugavpils was terminated because by then a parallel advance by another Soviet army along the right bank of the Dvina had placed it in a position where it could take Daugavpils from the north.

Towards the end of July, 6th Guards Army was committed to an advance on Riga from the southeast as part of a general offensive by 1st Baltic Front, which by the end of the month had reached the Gulf of Riga thereby isolating the bulk of Army Group North in Estonia and northern Latvia. However, 1st Baltic Front was only able to maintain its grip on the Gulf of Riga coastline for a few weeks and, though offensives against Army Group North continued throughout August and into September, they only made slow progress and Riga was not taken. By then 6th Guards Army had been deployed to the left flank of 1st Baltic Front west of Šiauliai in central Lithuania and the Army's chief of staff, Major-General Penkovskii, had been promoted to the rank of Lieutenant-General. On 24 September Soviet High Command decided to switch the direction of its offensive further south to strike west from the Shiauliai area to the Baltic coast at Memel (Klaipeda). Several Soviet armies were redeployed from the Riga area to the Shiauliai area for this offensive, which was ultimately to involve seven Soviet armies. Chistiakov's army and the neighbouring 43rd Army on Chistiakov's left were heavily reinforced and 1 Baltic Front provided them with ample concentrations of artillery. The offensive opened on 5 October and in the 6th Guards Army / 43 Army sector achieved a rapid breakthrough. With additional armies available to exploit this penetration due west towards Memel, Chistiakov's forces moved to the northwest aiming for the coastline north of Memel. By 8 October the coastline south of Memel had been reached by 43rd Army and German forces in the Baltic States had been permanently isolated from overland contact with Germany.

=== October 1944 to May 1945 ===
After being isolated in the Baltic States, and under constant pressure from Soviet armies in Estonia and Latvia, Army Group North had abandoned Riga and had withdrawn to the Courland Peninsula by mid-October. Chistiakov's army, together with three other armies of 1st Baltic Front, was moved north to join the armies of 2nd Baltic Front in attempting to subdue the German forces defending the Courland Peninsula.

During the second half of October, 6th Guards Army and seven other Soviet armies made a determined effort to break through the German Courland defenses, but without success. Chistiakov's army was to spend the rest of the war in the Courland Peninsula where it was involved in five further unsuccessful offensives to take the peninsula and during which it was subordinated to 2nd Baltic Front's command in February 1945 and subsequently to Leningrad Front's command.

At the end of the war in Europe, the 6th Guards Army consisted of the 2nd (9th Guards, 71st Guards, and 166th Rifle Divisions), 22nd (46th Guards Rifle, 16th Lithuanian, and 29th Rifle Divisions), and 30th Guards Rifle Corps (45th Guards, 63rd Guards, and 64th Guards Rifle Divisions), the three of which commanded a total of nine rifle divisions. Other units attached to the army included a gun-artillery brigade, an antitank regiment, five anti-aircraft regiments, a mortar regiment, a rocket launcher regiment, a heavy tank regiment, two assault gun regiments, two sapper brigades, and a flamethrower battalion.

=== Postwar ===
Between July 1945 and July 1946, it was commanded by Colonel general Ivan Grishin. In July 1946 Gen Lt Pyotr Koshevoy took over. Koshevoy would command the army until its disbandment.

The 6th Guards Army remained in the Baltic region after the war, comprising 2nd Guards Rifle Corps (9th Guards Rifle Division, 71st Guards Rifle Division, 166th Rifle Division) 22nd Guards Rifle Corps, 23rd Guards Rifle Corps, and 130th Latvian Rifle Corps, with up to 12 divisions, in November 1945. Its headquarters moved from Šiauliai to Riga in February 1946. It was disbanded on 20 March 1947.

At the time of disbandment it retained two Guards Rifle Corps, the 2nd Guards Rifle Corps (26th Guards Mechanised Division and 71st Rifle Division) and 23rd (51st Guards and 67th RD), of whom three survived, and 71st Rifle Division was disbanded along with the army.

== Commanders ==
- Colonel general Ivan Chistyakov (April 1943 - July 1945),
- Colonel general Ivan Grishin (July 1945 - July 1946),
- Lieutenant-General Pyotr Koshevoy (July 1946 - March 1947).

== Bibliography ==
- Cumins, Keith (2011). Cataclysm: The War on the Eastern Front, 1941-45. Solihull: Helion and Company. ISBN 9781907677236.
