= Khokhlovo =

Khokhlovo (Russian: Хохлово) is the name of several inhabited localities (work settlements, villages, selos, and pochinoks) in Russia.

Urban localities

- Khokhlovo, Kaduysky District, Vologda Oblast, a work settlement in Kaduysky District of Vologda Oblast

Rural localities

- Khokhlovo, Arkhangelsk Oblast, a village under the administrative jurisdiction of Privodino Urban-Type Settlement with Jurisdictional Territory in Kotlassky District of Arkhangelsk Oblast
- Khokhlovo, Belgorodsky District, Belgorod Oblast, a selo in Belgorodsky District, Belgorod Oblast
- Khokhlovo, Valuysky District, Belgorod Oblast, a selo in Printsevsky Rural Okrug of Valuysky District of Belgorod Oblast
- Khokhlovo, Kaluga Oblast, a selo in Meshchovsky District of Kaluga Oblast
- Khokhlovo, Kostroma Oblast, a village in Sudislavskoye Settlement of Sudislavsky District of Kostroma Oblast
- Khokhlovo, Moscow Oblast, a village in Nudolskoye Rural Settlement of Klinsky District of Moscow Oblast
- Khokhlovo, Nizhny Novgorod Oblast, a selo in Nadezhinsky Selsoviet of Ardatovsky District of Nizhny Novgorod Oblast
- Khokhlovo, Omsk Oblast, a selo in Khokhlovsky Rural Okrug of Sargatsky District of Omsk Oblast
- Khokhlovo, Perm Krai, a village in Kungursky District of Perm Krai
- Khokhlovo, Dedovichsky District, Pskov Oblast, a village in Dedovichsky District, Pskov Oblast
- Khokhlovo, Velikoluksky District, Pskov Oblast, a village in Velikoluksky District, Pskov Oblast
- Khokhlovo, Novoduginsky District, Smolensk Oblast, a village in Tesovskoye Rural Settlement of Novoduginsky District of Smolensk Oblast
- Khokhlovo, Smolensky District, Smolensk Oblast, a village in Khokhlovskoye Rural Settlement of Smolensky District of Smolensk Oblast
- Khokhlovo, Republic of Tatarstan, a selo in Vysokogorsky District of the Republic of Tatarstan
- Khokhlovo, Tyumen Oblast, a selo in Khokhlovsky Rural Okrug of Yalutorovsky District of Tyumen Oblast
- Khokhlovo, Vladimir Oblast, a village in Kameshkovsky District of Vladimir Oblast
- Khokhlovo, Kichmengsko-Gorodetsky District, Vologda Oblast, a pochinok in Trofimovsky Selsoviet of Kichmengsko-Gorodetsky District of Vologda Oblast
- Khokhlovo, Nyuksensky District, Vologda Oblast, a village in Brusensky Selsoviet of Nyuksensky District of Vologda Oblast
- Khokhlovo, Danilovsky District, Yaroslavl Oblast, a village in Seredskoy Rural Okrug of Danilovsky District of Yaroslavl Oblast
- Khokhlovo, Uglichsky District, Yaroslavl Oblast, a village in Ilyinsky Rural Okrug of Uglichsky District of Yaroslavl Oblast
