= Bolshoye =

Bolshoye Большое
- Selo
- Location within Belgorod Oblast Location within Russia
- Coordinates: 50°56′N 36°58′E
- Country: Russia
- Region: Belgorod Oblast
- District: Prokhorovsky District
- Time zone: UTC+3:00

Bolshoye (Russian: Большое) is a rural locality (a selo) in Prokhorovsky District, Belgorod Oblast, Russia. The population was 343 as of 2010. There are 6 streets.

== Geography ==
Bolshoye is located 25 km southeast of Prokhorovka (the district's administrative centre) by road. Khmelevoye is the nearest rural locality. Bolshoye is 260 meters higher from sea level.
