= Kondrovka =

Kondrovka Кондровка
- Selo
- Location within Belgorod Oblast Location within Russia
- Coordinates: 51°05′N 37°01′E
- Country: Russia
- Region: Belgorod Oblast
- District: Prokhorovsky District
- Time zone: UTC+3:00

Kondrovka (Russian: Кондровка) is a rural locality (a selo) in Prokhorovsky District, Belgorod Oblast, Russia. The population was 191 as of 2010. There are 3 streets.

== Geography ==
Kondrovka is located 25 km northeast of Prokhorovka (the district's administrative centre) by road. Radkovka is the nearest rural locality.
