= Plota =

Plota Плота
- Selo
- Location within Belgorod Oblast Location within Russia
- Coordinates: 50°55′N 36°45′E
- Country: Russia
- Region: Belgorod Oblast
- District: Prokhorovsky District
- Time zone: UTC+3:00

Plota (Russian: Плота) is a rural locality (a selo) in Prokhorovsky District, Belgorod Oblast, Russia. The population was 438 as of 2010. There are 7 streets.

== Geography ==
Plota is located 17 km south of Prokhorovka (the district's administrative centre) by road. Maloyablonovo is the nearest rural locality.
