= Zarnitsy =

Zarnitsy Зарницы
- Khutor
- Location within Belgorod Oblast Location within Russia
- Coordinates: 51°00′N 37°01′E
- Country: Russia
- Region: Belgorod Oblast
- District: Prokhorovsky District
- Time zone: UTC+3:00

Zarnitsy (Russian: Зарницы) is a rural locality (a khutor) in Prokhorovsky District, Belgorod Oblast, Russia. The population was 13 as of 2010. There are 2 streets.

== Geography ==
Zarnitsy is located 36 km southeast of Prokhorovka (the district's administrative centre) by road. Gagarino and Lisichki are is the nearest rural locality.
