= Pereleski =

Pereleski (Russian: Перелески) is the name of several rural localities in Russia:

- Pereleski, Belgorod Oblast, a khutor in Prokhorovsky District, Belgorod Oblast
- Pereleski, Chernyakhovsky District, Kaliningrad Oblast, a village in Chernyakhovsky District in Kaliningrad Oblast
- Pereleski, Zelenogradsky District, Kaliningrad Oblast, a village in Zelenogradsky District in Kaliningrad Oblast
- Pereleski, Penza Oblast, a selo in Gorodishchensky District in Penza Oblast
- Pereleski, Yaroslavl Oblast, a village in Pereslavsky District in Yaroslavl Oblast

== See also ==
- Perelisky (disambiguation)
