= Plyushchiny =

Plyushchiny Плющины
- Selo
- Location within Belgorod Oblast Location within Russia
- Coordinates: 50°59′N 37°03′E
- Country: Russia
- Region: Belgorod Oblast
- District: Prokhorovsky District
- Time zone: UTC+3:00

Plyushchiny (Russian: Плющины) is a rural locality (a selo) in Prokhorovsky District, Belgorod Oblast, Russia. The population was 108 as of 2010. There are 4 streets.

== Geography ==
Plyushchiny is located 31 km east of Prokhorovka (the district's administrative centre) by road. Kholodnoye is the nearest rural locality.
