= Radkovka =

Radkovka Радьковка
- Selo
- Location within Belgorod Oblast Location within Russia
- Coordinates: 51°05′N 36°57′E
- Country: Russia
- Region: Belgorod Oblast
- District: Prokhorovsky District
- Time zone: UTC+3:00

Radkovka (Russian: Радьковка) is a rural locality (a selo) and the administrative center of Radkovskoye Rural Settlement, Prokhorovsky District, Belgorod Oblast, Russia. The population was 1,024 as of 2010. There are 13 streets.

== Geography ==
Radkovka is located 22 km northeast of Prokhorovka (the district's administrative centre) by road. Petrovka is the nearest rural locality.
