= Studyony =

Studyony Студёный
- Khutor
- Location within Belgorod Oblast Location within Russia
- Coordinates: 51°00′N 37°08′E
- Country: Russia
- Region: Belgorod Oblast
- District: Prokhorovsky District
- Time zone: UTC+3:00

Studyony (Russian: Студёный) is a rural locality (a khutor) in Prokhorovsky District, Belgorod Oblast, Russia. The population was 11 in 2010. There are two streets.

== Geography ==
Studyony is located 30 km east of Prokhorovka (the district's administrative centre) by road. Kholodnoye is the nearest rural locality.
