= Zhuravka-Pervaya =

Zhuravka-Pervaya Журавка-Первая
- Selo
- Location within Belgorod Oblast Location within Russia
- Coordinates: 51°07′N 36°53′E
- Country: Russia
- Region: Belgorod Oblast
- District: Prokhorovsky District
- Time zone: UTC+3:00

Zhuravka-Pervaya (Russian: Журавка-Первая) is a rural locality (a selo) and the administrative center of Zhuravskoye Rural Settlement, Prokhorovsky District, Belgorod Oblast, Russia. The population was 608 as of 2010. There are 13 streets.

== Geography ==
Zhuravka-Pervaya is located 23 km northeast of Prokhorovka (the district's administrative centre) by road. Zhuravka-Vtoraya is the nearest rural locality.
