= Podolkhi =

Podolkhi Подольхи
- Selo
- Location within Belgorod Oblast Location within Russia
- Coordinates: 50°58′N 36°53′E
- Country: Russia
- Region: Belgorod Oblast
- District: Prokhorovsky District
- Time zone: UTC+3:00

Podolkhi (Russian: Подольхи) is a rural locality (a selo) and the administrative center of Podoleshenskoye Rural Settlement, Prokhorovsky District, Belgorod Oblast, Russia. The population was 992 as of 2010. There are 11 streets.

== Geography ==
Podolkhi is located 18 km southeast of Prokhorovka (the district's administrative centre) by road. Domanovka is the nearest rural locality.
