= Malye Mayachki =

Malye Mayachki Малые Маячки
- Selo
- Location within Belgorod Oblast Location within Russia
- Coordinates: 50°58′N 36°29′E
- Country: Russia
- Region: Belgorod Oblast
- District: Prokhorovsky District
- Time zone: UTC+3:00

Malye Mayachki (Russian: Малые Маячки) is a rural locality (a selo) and the administrative center of Malomayachenskoye Rural Settlement, Prokhorovsky District, Belgorod Oblast, Russia. The population was 445 as of 2010. There are 5 streets.

== Geography ==
Malye Mayachki is located 22 km southwest of Prokhorovka (the district's administrative centre) by road. Gryaznoye is the nearest rural locality.
