= Donets, Belgorod Oblast =

Donets Донец
- Selo
- Location within Belgorod Oblast Location within Russia
- Coordinates: 50°57′N 37°02′E
- Country: Russia
- Region: Belgorod Oblast
- District: Prokhorovsky District
- Time zone: UTC+3:00

Donets (Russian: Донец) is a rural locality (a selo) in Prokhorovsky District, Belgorod Oblast, Russia. The population was 281 as of 2010. There are 3 streets.

== Geography ==
Donets is located 32 km southeast of Prokhorovka (the district's administrative centre) by road. Setnoye is the nearest rural locality.
