= Prokhorovsky =

Prokhorovsky (masculine), Prokhorovskaya (feminine), or Prokhorovskoye (neuter) may refer to:

- Prokhorovsky District, a district of Belgorod Oblast, Russia
- Prokhorovsky (rural locality), a rural locality (a settlement) in Pochepsky District of Bryansk Oblast, Russia
- Prokhorovskoye, a rural locality (a village) in Yaroslavsky District of Yaroslavl Oblast, Russia
