= Luchki =

Luchki Лучки
- Selo
- Location within Belgorod Oblast Location within Russia
- Coordinates: 50°52′N 36°32′E
- Country: Russia
- Region: Belgorod Oblast
- District: Prokhorovsky District
- Time zone: UTC+3:00

Luchki (Russian: Лучки) is a rural locality (a selo) and the administrative center of Luchkovskoye Rural Settlement, Prokhorovsky District, Belgorod Oblast, Russia. The population was 371 as of 2010. There are 4 streets.

== Geography ==
Luchki is located 33 km southwest of Prokhorovka (the district's administrative centre) by road. Nechayevka is the nearest rural locality.
