= Perelisky =

Perelisky (Ukrainian: Переліски), may refer to the following places in Ukraine:

- Perelisky, Lviv Oblast, village in Brody Raion, Lviv Oblast
- Perelisky, Poltava Oblast, village in Zinkiv Raion, Poltava Oblast
- Perelisky, Sumy Oblast, village in Lebedyn Raion, Sumy Oblast
- Perelisky, Vinnytsia Oblast, village in Bar Raion, Vinnytsia Oblast

== See also ==
- Pereleski
