= Shakhovo =

Shakhovo Шахово
- Selo
- Location within Belgorod Oblast Location within Russia
- Coordinates: 50°52′N 36°43′E
- Country: Russia
- Region: Belgorod Oblast
- District: Prokhorovsky District
- Time zone: UTC+3:00

Shakhovo (Russian: Шахово) is a rural locality (a selo) and the administrative center of Shakhovskoye Rural Settlement, Prokhorovsky District, Belgorod Oblast, Russia. The population was 317 as of 2010. There are 6 streets.

== Geography ==
Shakhovo is located 21 km south of Prokhorovka (the district's administrative centre) by road. Kleymenovo is the nearest rural locality.
