= Pereleski, Belgorod Oblast =

Pereleski Перелески
- Khutor
- Location within Belgorod Oblast Location within Russia
- Coordinates: 51°08′N 36°47′E
- Country: Russia
- Region: Belgorod Oblast
- District: Prokhorovsky District
- Time zone: UTC+3:00

Pereleski (Russian: Перелески) is a rural locality (a khutor) in Prokhorovsky District, Belgorod Oblast, Russia. The population was 70 as of 2010. There is 1 street.

== Geography ==
Pereleski is located 30 km north of Prokhorovka (the district's administrative centre) by road. Grigoryevka is the nearest rural locality.
