= Maloyablonovo =

Maloyablonovo Малояблоново
- Selo
- Location within Belgorod Oblast Location within Russia
- Coordinates: 50°55′N 36°42′E
- Country: Russia
- Region: Belgorod Oblast
- District: Prokhorovsky District
- Time zone: UTC+3:00

Maloyablonovo (Russian: Малояблоново) is a rural locality (a selo) in Prokhorovsky District, Belgorod Oblast, Russia. The population was 201 as of 2010. There are 3 streets.

== Geography ==
Maloyablonovo is located 16 km south of Prokhorovka (the district's administrative centre) by road. Plota is the nearest rural locality.
