= Myasoyedovo =

Myasoyedovo Мясоедово
- Selo
- Location within Belgorod Oblast Location within Russia
- Coordinates: 50°37′N 36°48′E
- Country: Russia
- Region: Belgorod Oblast
- District: Belgorodsky District
- Time zone: UTC+3:00

Myasoyedovo (Russian: Мясоедово) is a rural locality (a selo) and the administrative center of Belovskoye Rural Settlement, Belgorodsky District, Belgorod Oblast, Russia. The population was 464 as of 2010. There are eight streets.

== Geography ==
Myasoyedovo is located 35 km northeast of Maysky (the district's administrative centre) by road. Sevryukovo is the nearest rural locality.
