= Boghiceni =

- Village
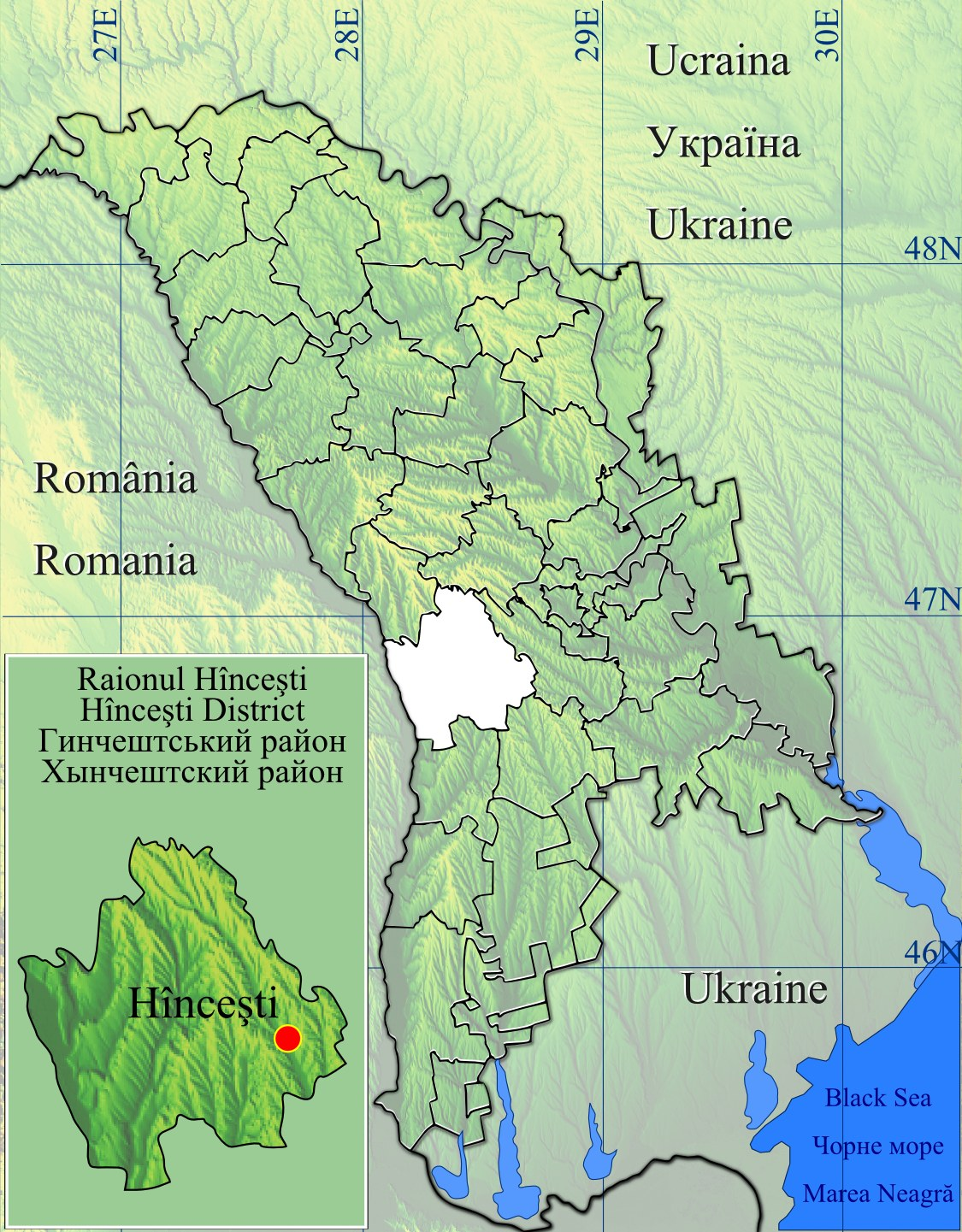
- Location within Hîncești
- Coordinates: 46°56′36″N 28°19′29″E
- Country: Moldova

Government
  - Mayor: Ion Zoină (PLDM)

Population (2014 census)
  - Total: 2,350
- Time zone: UTC+2 (EET)
  - Summer (DST): UTC+3 (EEST)
- Postal code: MD-3414

Boghiceni is a village in Hîncești District, Moldova. It is situated in the valley of the Călmățui River, 28 km from Hîncești and 64 km from Chișinău. The village has a population of approximately 2,350 people. Boghiceni has a rich history dating back to ancient times and is primarily engaged in agriculture.

== Geography ==
Boghicenii is situated in the valley of the small river Călmățui, south of its source, 28 km from Hîncești and 64 km from Chișinău. The village's territory borders the localities of Bujor, Lăpușna, Șipoteni, Pașcani, Iurceni, and Mirești. Many centuries ago, this area was a vast open field where herds of wild animals roamed. It is possible that they settled here for rest and burial of fallen warriors, nomadic fighters who came for plunder from the Asian steppes.

== History ==
Documentarily, the village of Boghiceni is mentioned for the first time in a charter of Ștefan cel Mare (Stephen the Great) dating back to January 9, 1489, which specifies the boundaries of a village named Petricani, which no longer exists today. The document shows the borders of that village: "the edge goes up in front of Lăpușna... until it meets Dragomirești and Bujor, and from there... straight to Movila lui Fulger... and hits the slopes of Boghiceni... until it reaches the border opposite the gios lake..."

The village of Boghiceni is also mentioned in later documents, including on November 8, 1666, when Iliaș Alexandru Voievod confirms certain parts of the estate of the village of Secăreni to the medelnicer Mihalcea Hîncu, and then on May 30, 1669, in the act of delimitation and division of the estate of Iurceni in the Lăpușna region.

From ancient documents, we learn that in the past, a part of the Boghiceni estate belonged to the peasants of the village, while another part belonged to the Monastery of St. John Chrysostom in Iași. Through a princely act of Grigore Ioan Calimah Voievod, dated June 1, 1768, the boundaries of the Boghiceni estate were established, following "the signs of the Boghiceni border according to the certainty of the border... from Stefan Voiedov from the year 6997 (1489), month 9." Among the mentioned signs of the estate are the existing place names at that time: Fața Călmățuiului, Zăpodia, Moșia Oii, Valea Socilor, Fîntîna Mare, Capui Mladenului, Ruptura, Cuibul Breahnii, Mlădineștii, Dumbrava, Trifenii (now called Pașcan), Moșia Chetroșeni (of the Bărboiu Monastery), Prăvalu, movila Petricăî, Moșia Mîrzeștilor, Piscul Nant, Șleahul cel Mare. Some of these local names have been preserved in the speech of the locals to this day (Valea Socilor, Mladinul, Ruptura, etc.), while others have disappeared or have been replaced with new names.

As a monastery property, the Boghiceni estate is recorded in the materials of the census of 1772 (1774). At that time, the village had 45 peasant households, of which 42 belonged to birnics. It was not a very populous settlement, but it was equipped with everything necessary for life: windmills, apiaries, orchards with fruit trees, meadows, and enough arable land.

The primary occupation of the inhabitants was agriculture. However, according to the documents of the time, there were also craftsmen in the village, such as wheelwrights, blacksmiths, tanners, and furriers. Here are some names of native inhabitants mentioned in the records of the same census: Ștefan Dănilă, Antohi Tabără, Ioniță Chircu, Timofti Cazacu, Constantin Gonat, Vasilache Bătrînu, Grigoraș Doni, Ichim Cătană, Ion Gonfu, Dănilă Puhoace. For some residents, their occupation, profession, or position is indicated instead of a family name, such as Ioniță the furrier, Vasile the servant, Ion the vornic, Grigoraș the tavern keeper, Ion the wheelwright, Zaharia the teacher, Luchian the interpreter, and others.

Towards the late 18th century and early 19th century, there was an improvement in the development of the locality. The "Condica liuzilor" (Register of Taxes) from 1803 records 82 households in Boghiceni, with an annual tax of 1,932 lei. The lands within the boundaries of the estate were owned by peasant landowners and a wealthier landowner, medelnicer Todirascu Măcărescu. In addition to farming, the locals were also engaged in carting.

According to the 1817 census, there were 140 households in the village, and the estate had a total of 1,741 "fălci" (a unit of land measurement): 41 fălci within the village, 400 fălci of forest, 400 fălci of arable land, 60 fălci of meadow, and 250 fălci of pasture. Among the local landowners, serdar Măcărescu is mentioned.

Other documentary mentions from the 19th and 20th centuries regarding the economic and demographic situation of the locality include: in 1859 - 194 households with a population of 908 inhabitants, with Egor Leonard as the owner of a part of the estate; in 1864 - 418 des. (or 1,213 square prăjini) of forest; in 1904 - 232 houses, a church dedicated to St. Michael, an elementary school with teaching in Russian, local peasants owning 1,452 des. of land, and owners Petru and Olga Leonard owning 2,158 des. of land; in 1930 - 1,847 inhabitants, the absolute majority being Romanian citizens.

According to the Statistical Dictionary of Moldova (1994) and the materials from the Boghiceni City Hall archives, the following informative data can be found about the current locality: 951 households and 859 individual houses, 2,782 inhabitants, of which 2,774 are Romanians, 2,400 hectares of agricultural land (1,409 hectares of arable land, 366 hectares of vineyards, 170 hectares of orchards), 329 hectares of individual sector agricultural land, an ambulance station, a secondary school, a kindergarten, a cultural center, 2 libraries, a telecommunications office, and 6 stores. The Church of the Holy Apostles Peter and Paul was built in 1884.

The name of the locality comes from a personal name, Boghicea, derived from the word "boaghe," which refers to a type of bird (hawk), or from the anthroponymic name Boaghe, with the suffixes -ice, -icea, or -eni. Initially, both the estate and the village were likely named after a certain Boghicea or Boaghe.

== Demografics ==
=== Ethnic Structure ===
According to recensământului populației din 2004:

Ethnic Group	Population	% Percentage
Natives declaredMoldovans Roumanian natives inhabitants	2783 55	97,31% 1,92%
Ukrainian	11	0,38%
Russian	6	0,21%
Găgăuzi	1	0,03%
Gypsies	1	0,03%
Others	3	0,10%
Total	2860	
