= Khokhlovo, Nyuksensky District, Vologda Oblast =

Khokhlovo Хохлово
- Village
- Location within Vologda Oblast Location within Russia
- Coordinates: 60°13′N 43°57′E
- Country: Russia
- Region: Vologda Oblast
- District: Nyuksensky District
- Time zone: UTC+3:00

Khokhlovo (Russian: Хохлово) is a rural locality (a village) in Gorodishchenskoye Rural Settlement, Nyuksensky District, Vologda Oblast, Russia. The population was 21 as of 2002.

== Geography ==
Khokhlovo is located 59 km southwest of Nyuksenitsa (the district's administrative centre) by road. Pustynya is the nearest rural locality.
