= Perelisky, Poltava Oblast =

Village in Poltava Oblast, Ukraine

Perelisky Переліски
- Village
- Location of Perelisky within the Poltava Oblast Perelisky (Ukraine)
- Coordinates: 50°12′43″N 34°18′59″E
- Country: Ukraine
- Oblast: Poltava Oblast
- Raion: Poltava Raion
- Elevation: 157 m (515 ft)

Population (2001)
  - Total: 39
- Time zone: UTC+2 (EET)
  - Summer (DST): UTC+3 (EEST)
- Postal code: 38104
- Area code: +380 5353

Perelisky (Ukrainian: Переліски) is a village in Poltava Raion, Poltava Oblast in central Ukraine. It belongs to Zinkiv urban hromada, one of the hromadas of Ukraine.

Until 18 July 2020, Perelisky was located in Zinkiv Raion. The raion was abolished on 18 July 2020 as part of the administrative reform of Ukraine, which reduced the number of raions of Poltava Oblast to four. The area of Zinkiv Raion was merged into Poltava Raion.
