= Gostishchevo =

Gostishchevo Гостищево
- Selo
- Location within Belgorod Oblast Location within Russia
- Coordinates: 50°46′N 36°39′E
- Country: Russia
- Region: Belgorod Oblast
- District: Yakovlevsky District
- Time zone: UTC+3:00

Gostishchevo (Russian: Гостищево) is a rural locality (a selo) and the administrative center of Gostishchevskoye Rural Settlement, Yakovlevsky District, Belgorod Oblast, Russia. The population was 2,731 as of 2010. There are 50 streets.

== Geography ==
Gostishchevo is located 18 km east of Stroitel (the district's administrative centre) by road. Druzhny is the nearest rural locality.
