= Khokhlovo, Vladimir Oblast =

Khokhlovo Хохлово
- Village
- Location within Vladimir Oblast Location within Russia
- Coordinates: 56°12′N 40°45′E
- Country: Russia
- Region: Vladimir Oblast
- District: Kameshkovsky District
- Time zone: UTC+3:00

Khokhlovo (Russian: Хохлово) is a rural locality (a village) in Vtorovskoye Rural Settlement, Kameshkovsky District, Vladimir Oblast, Russia. The population was 9 as of 2010.

== Geography ==
Khokhlovo is located 24 km southwest of Kameshkovo (the district's administrative centre) by road. Bliznino is the nearest rural locality.
