= Khokhlovo, Valuysky District, Belgorod Oblast =

Khokhlovo Хохлово
- Selo
- Location within Belgorod Oblast Location within Russia
- Coordinates: 50°16′N 37°57′E
- Country: Russia
- Region: Belgorod Oblast
- District: Valuysky District
- Time zone: UTC+3:00

Khokhlovo (Russian: Хохлово) is a rural locality (a selo) in Valuysky District, Belgorod Oblast, Russia. The population was 335 as of 2010. There are 9 streets.

== Geography ==
Khokhlovo is located 18 km northwest of Valuyki (the district's administrative centre) by road. Terekhovo is the nearest rural locality.
