= Khokhlovo, Belgorodsky District, Belgorod Oblast =

Khokhlovo Хохлово
- Selo
- Location within Belgorod Oblast Location within Russia
- Coordinates: 50°42′N 36°40′E
- Country: Russia
- Region: Belgorod Oblast
- District: Belgorodsky District
- Time zone: UTC+3:00

Khokhlovo (Russian: Хохлово) is a rural locality (a selo) and the administrative center of Khokhlovskoye Rural Settlement, Belgorodsky District, Belgorod Oblast, Russia. The population was 1,011 as of 2010. There are 18 streets.

== Geography ==
Khokhlovo is located 34 km northeast of Maysky (the district's administrative centre) by road. Petropavlovka is the nearest rural locality.
