= Prokhorovka, Belgorod Oblast =

Settlement in Russia

Prokhorovka Прохоровка
- Urban-type settlement
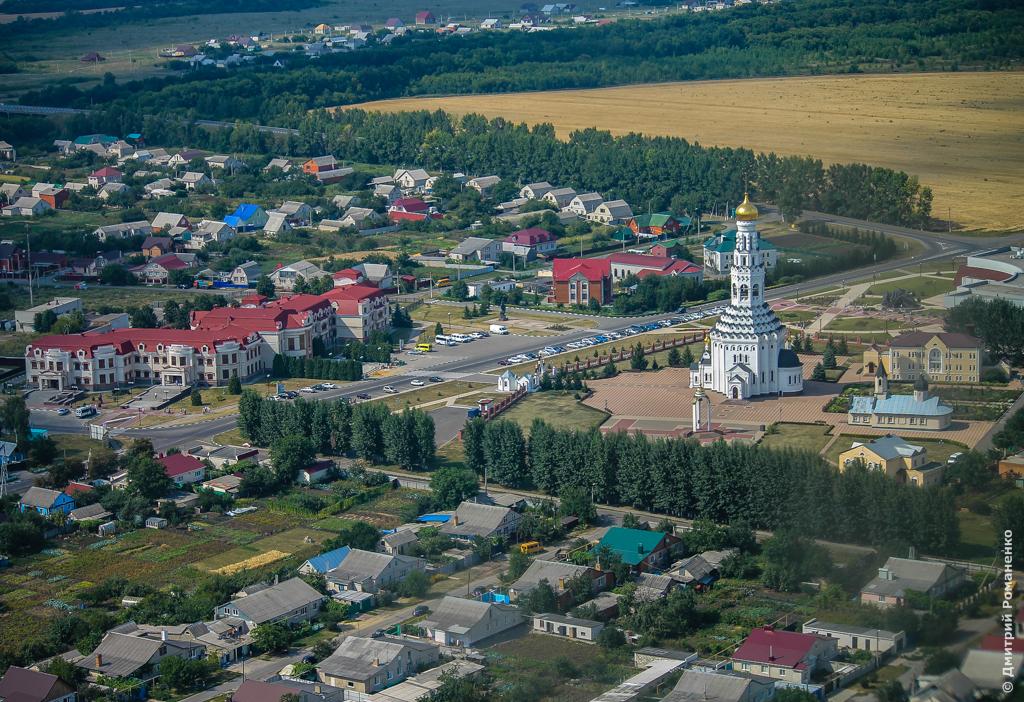
- Aerial view

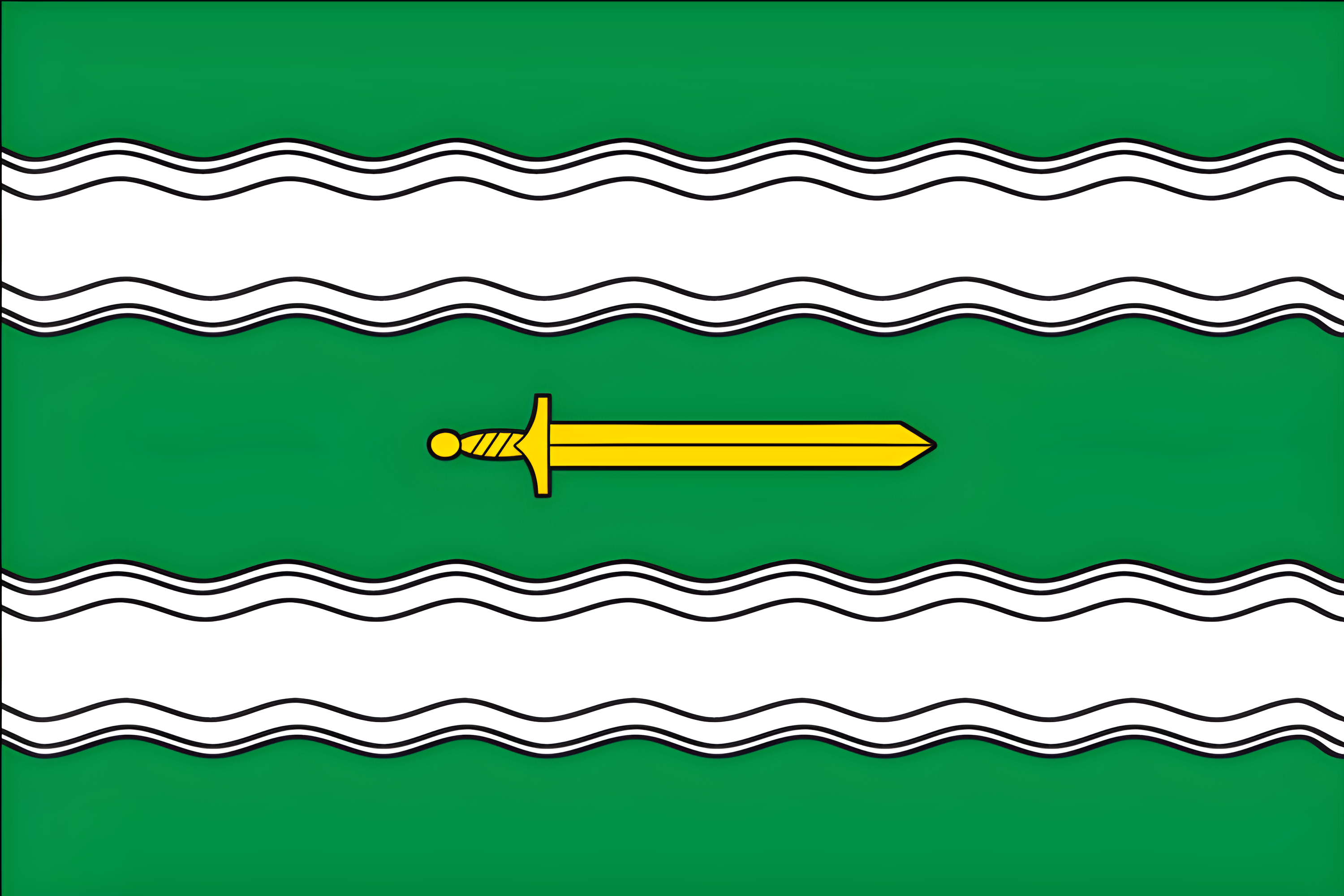
- Flag
- Interactive map of Prokhorovka
- Location of Prokhorovka Prokhorovka (European Russia) Prokhorovka (Russia)
- Country: Russia
- Federal subject: Belgorod Oblast
- Administrative district: Prokhorovsky District
- Founded: 1869

Population
  - Estimate (2021): 9,790 )
- Time zone: UTC+3 (MSK)
- Postal code: 309000
- OKTMO ID: 14646151051

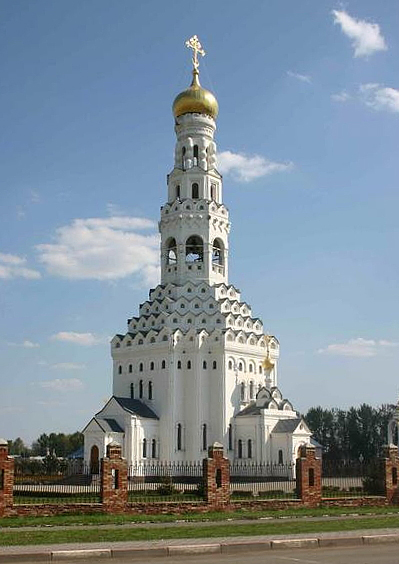
Prokhorovka's monument to the dead Soviet soldiers

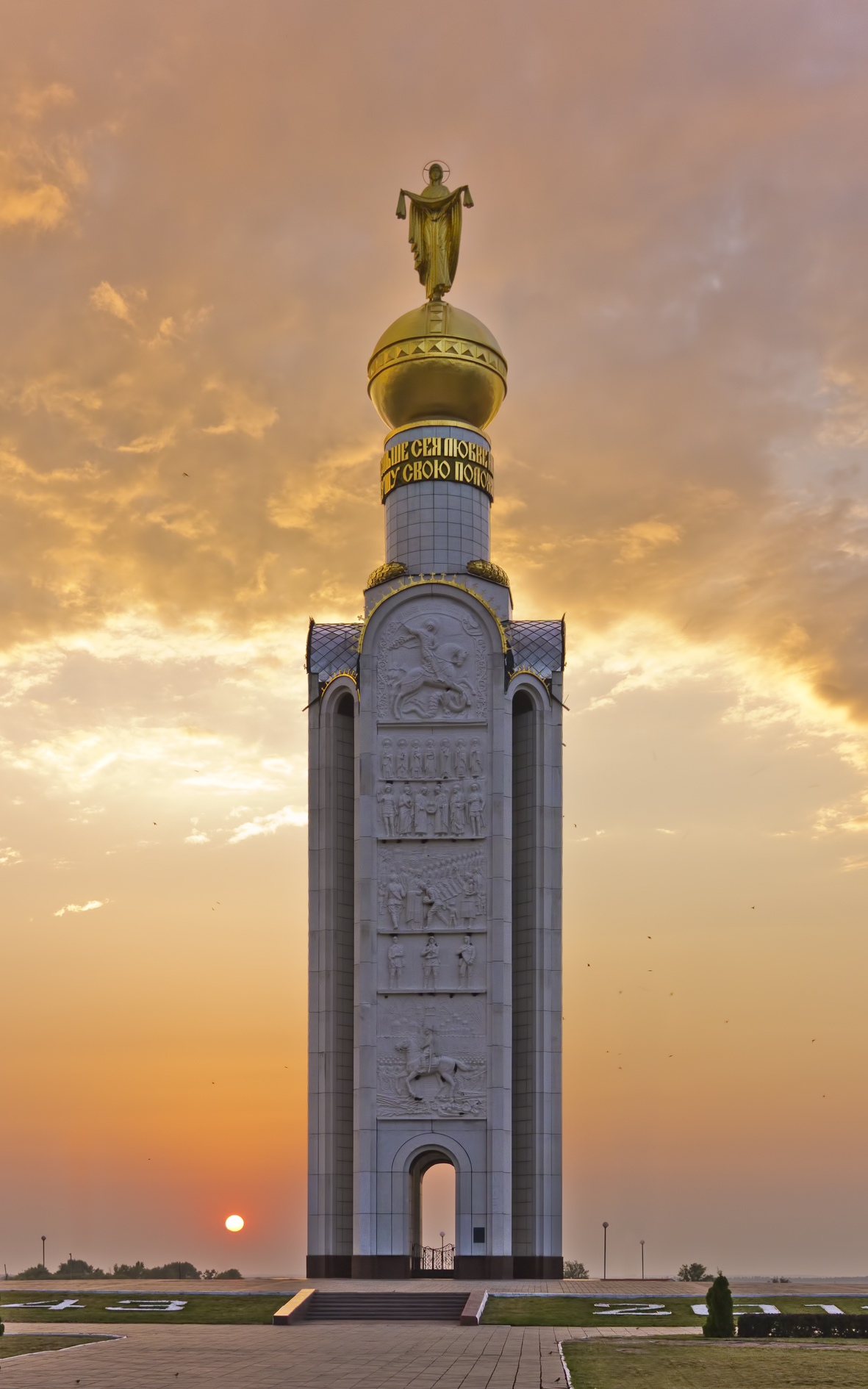
A memorial on the Prokhorovka battlefield

Prokhorovka (Russian: Про́хоровка, IPA: [ˈproxərəfkə]) is an urban locality (a settlement) and the administrative center of Prokhorovsky District of Belgorod Oblast, Russia, along the Psyol River southeast of the city of Kursk. Population: 9,790 (2021 census); 9,761 (2010 census); 10,007 (2002 census); 8,093 (1989 Soviet census).

== History ==
The first mention of the populated area in historical documents dates back to the second half of the 17th century. Polish nobleman Kiril G. Ilyinsky and his son Sava left during the Russo-Polish war of 1654–1667 in Poland under the Belgorod, where they founded the suburb Elias. In 1860 Elias Sloboda was renamed in honor of the reigning Emperor Alexander II in the village of Alexandrov. In the 1880s west of the village passed a line of the Kursk-Kharkov-Azov railway. At the same time Prokhorovka station was built, named after the railway engineer V. I. Prokhorov responsible for its construction. In the summer of 1943, Prokhorovka was the site of the Battle of Prokhorovka, a major armored confrontation during the Battle of Kursk of World War II. In July 2013, Vice Prime Minister Dmitry Rogozin offered to establish by 2015 a museum commemorating the battle. The display of armored vehicles will be permanent and the technologies shown there will bring up recollections of the events of World War II.

== Transportation ==
Prokhorovka serves as a railway station on a major railway linking Moscow and the Ukrainian city of Kharkiv.

== Gallery ==
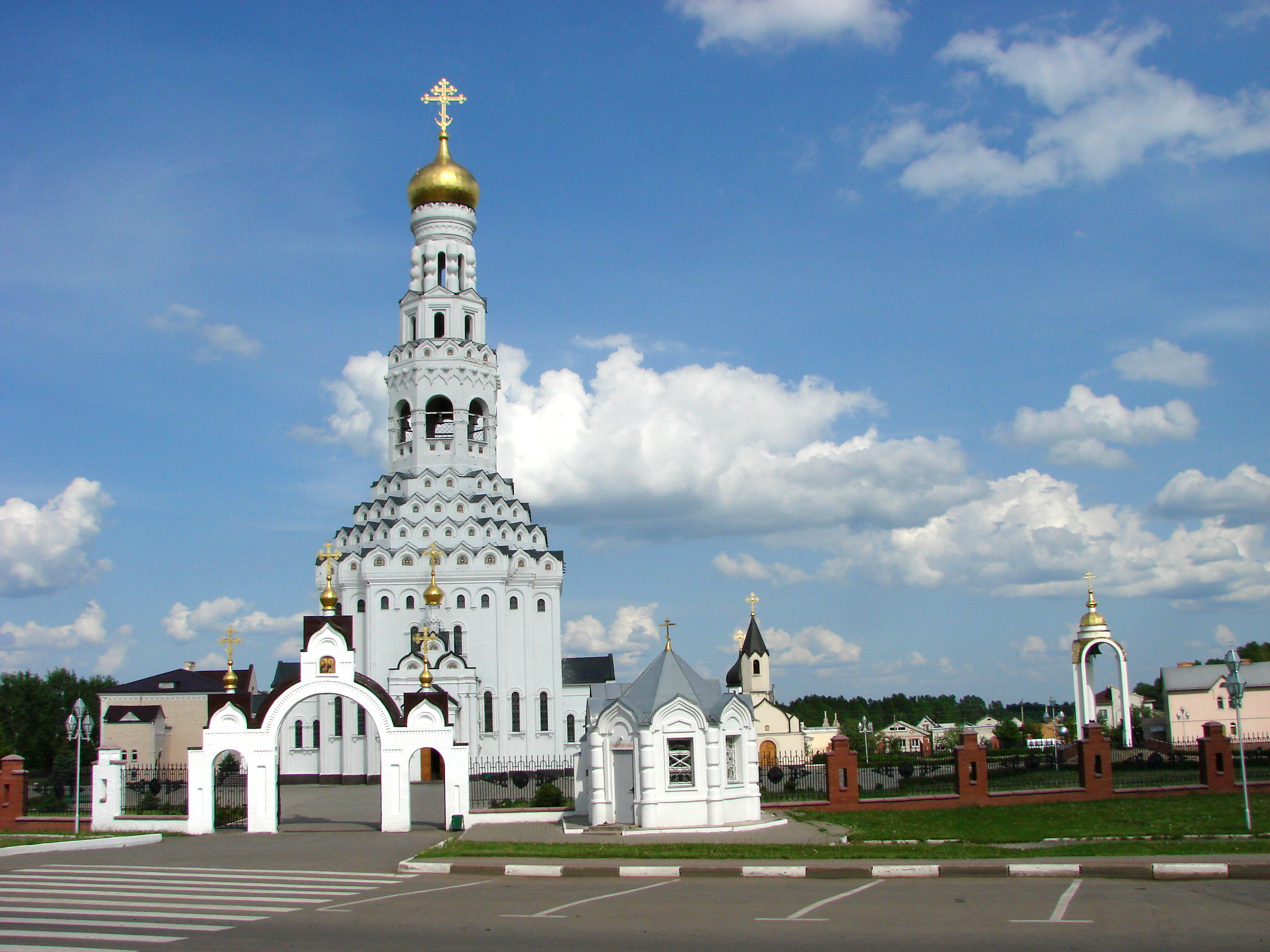
Orthodox monastery, Prokhorovka

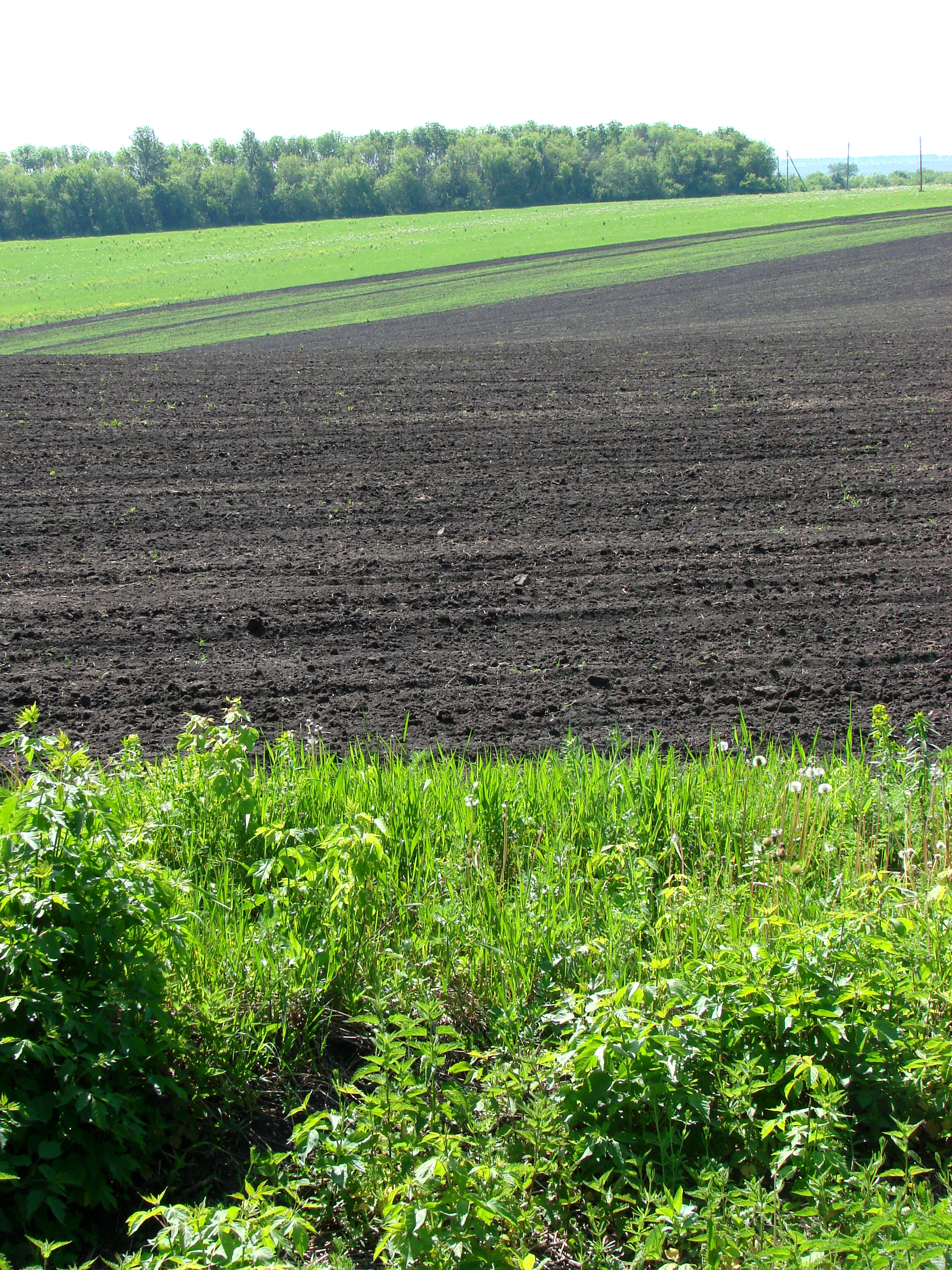
Black earth, Prokhorovka

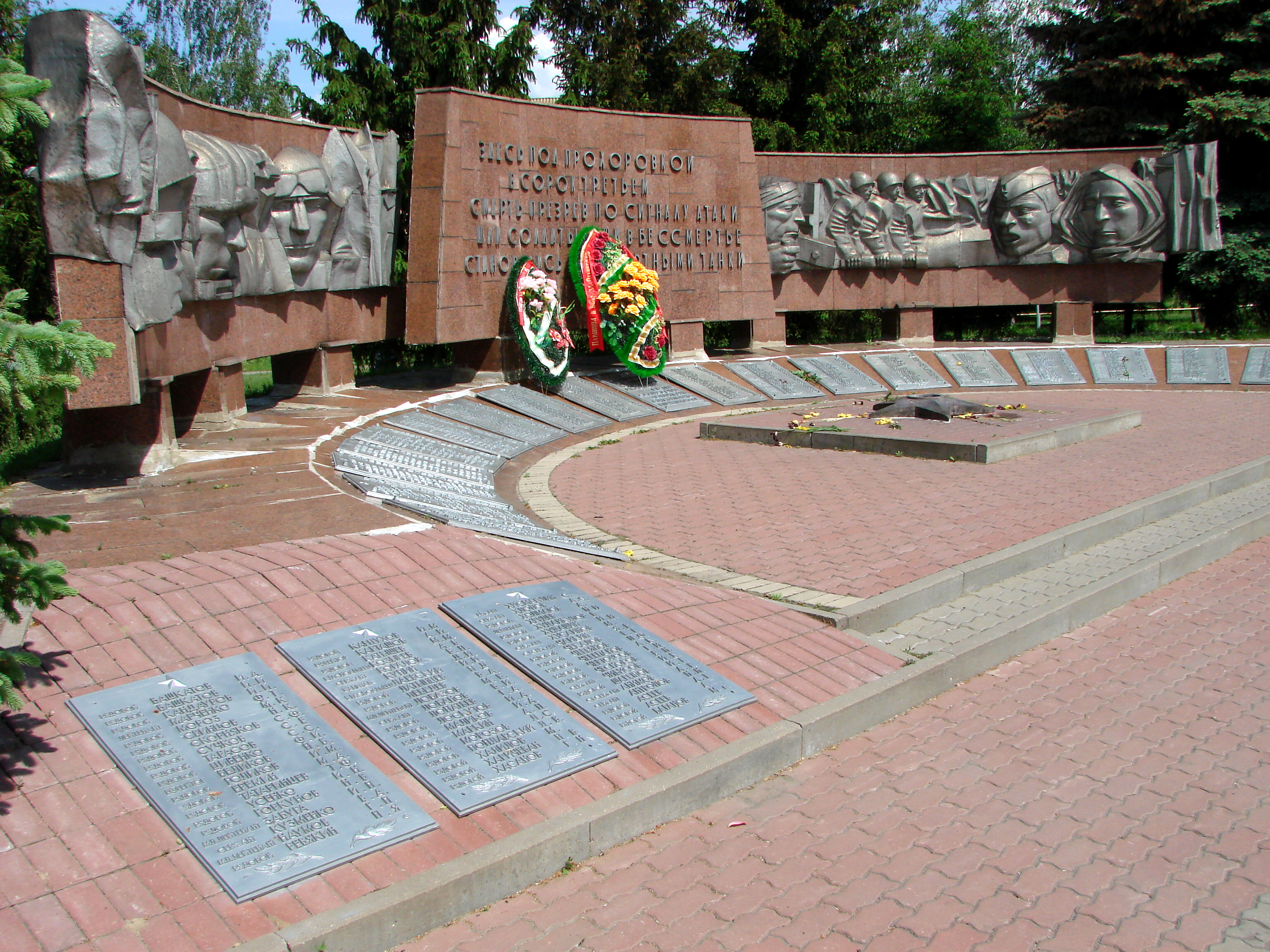
Eternal flame war memorial, Prokhorovka

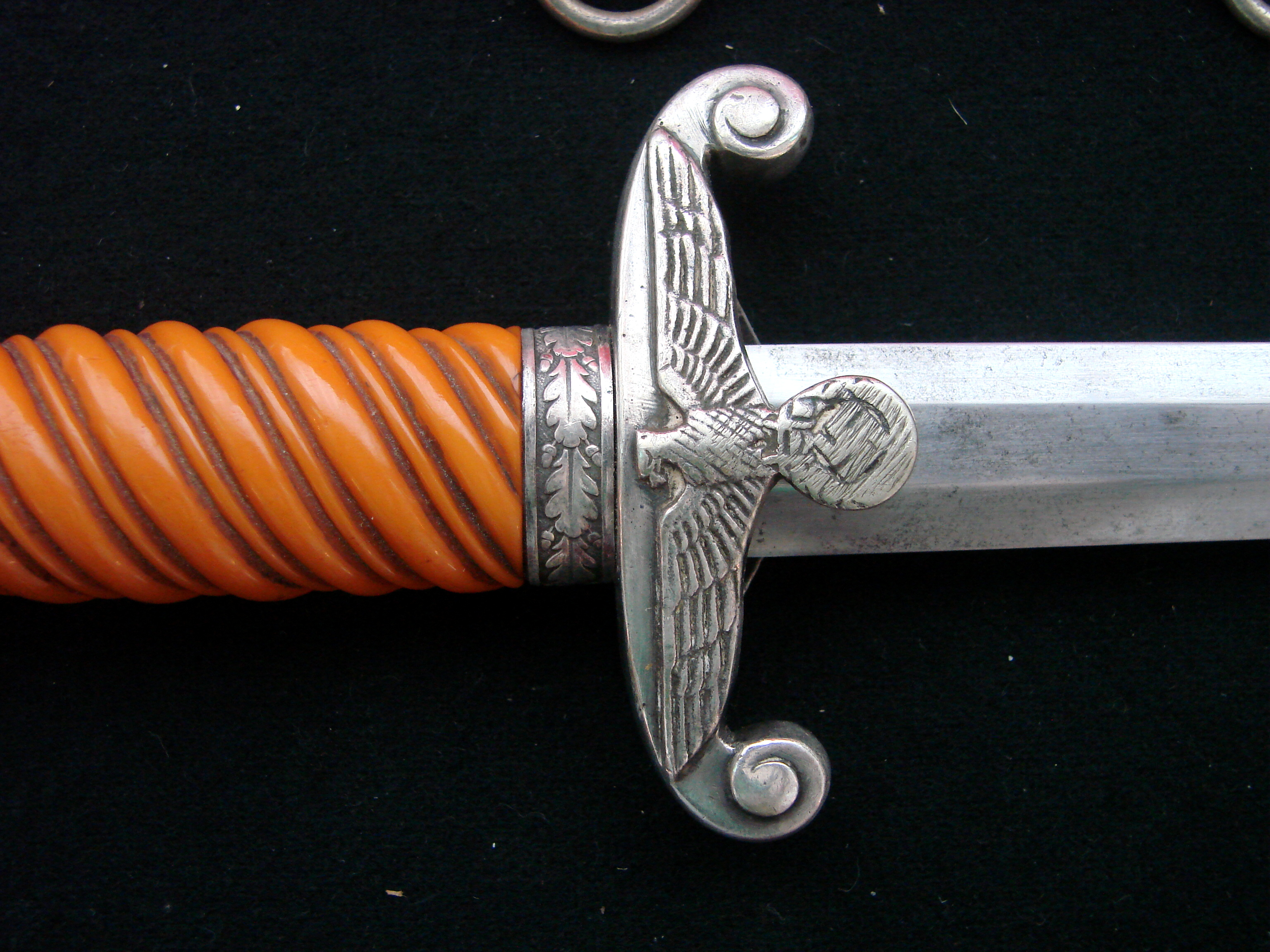
Captured German sword in war museum, Prokhorovka

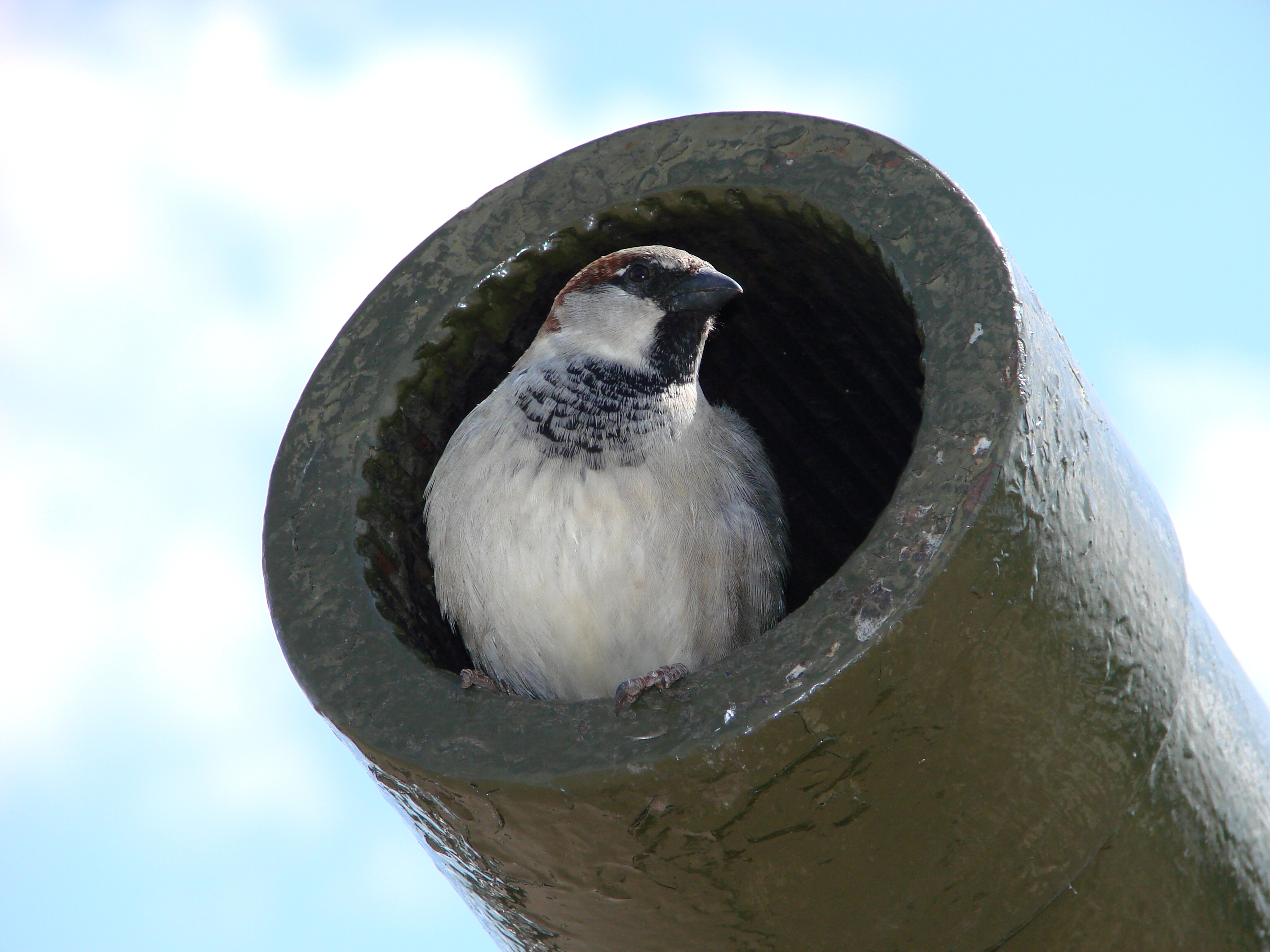
Sparrow in gun barrel of tank, Prokhorovka

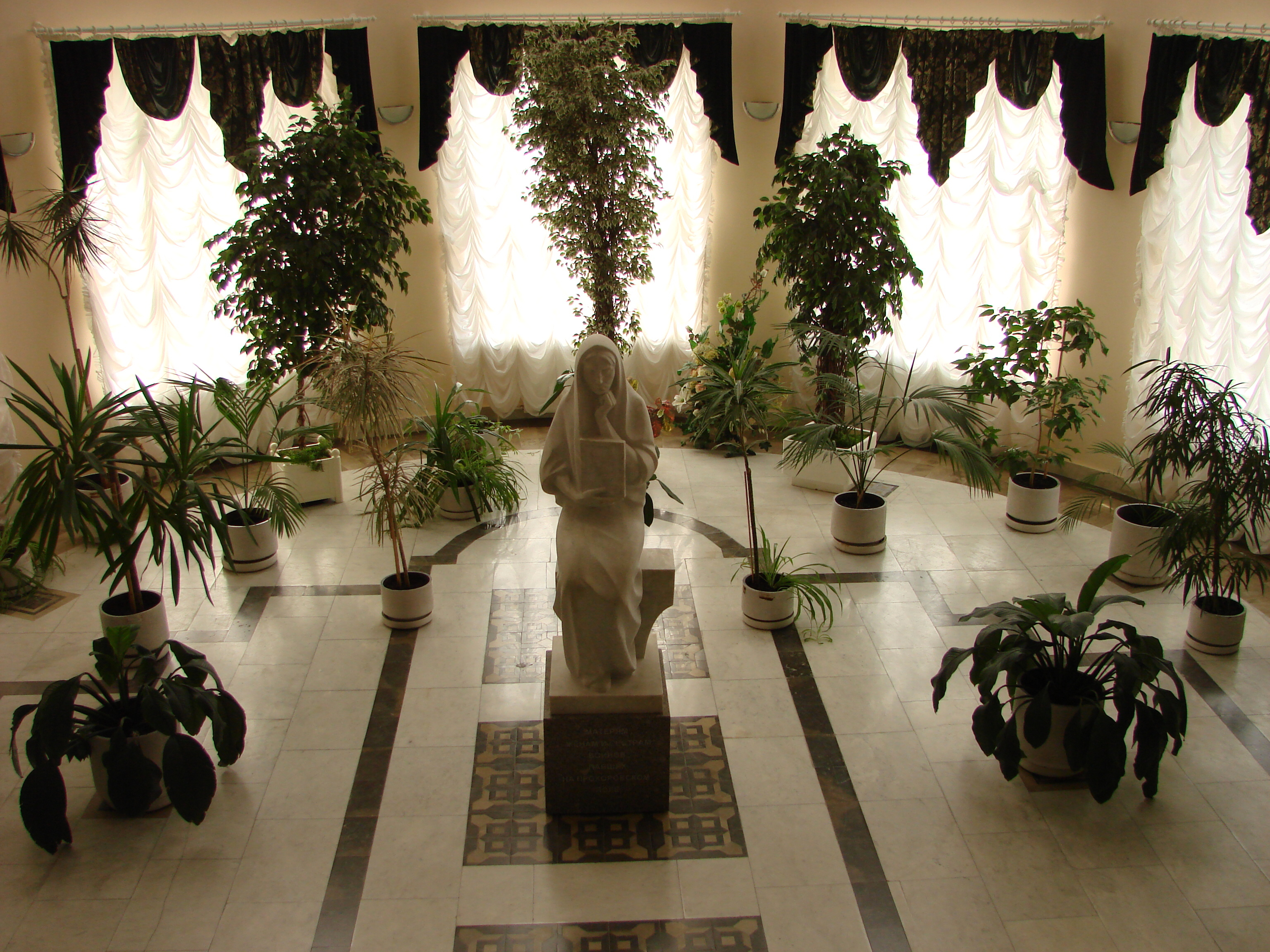
Statue of grieving mother, Hotel Complex Projorovskoe lobby

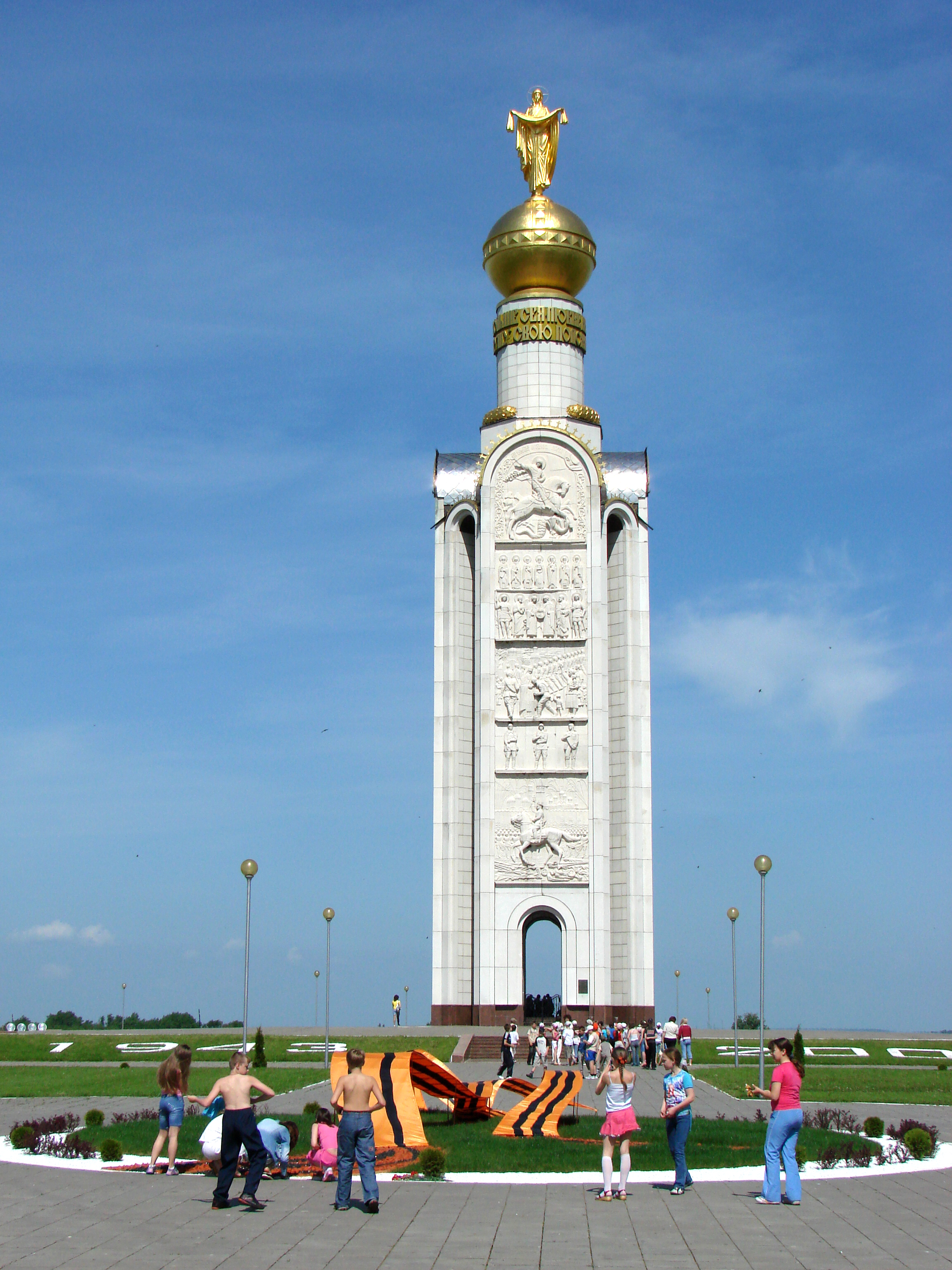
Victory Memorial, Prokhorovka

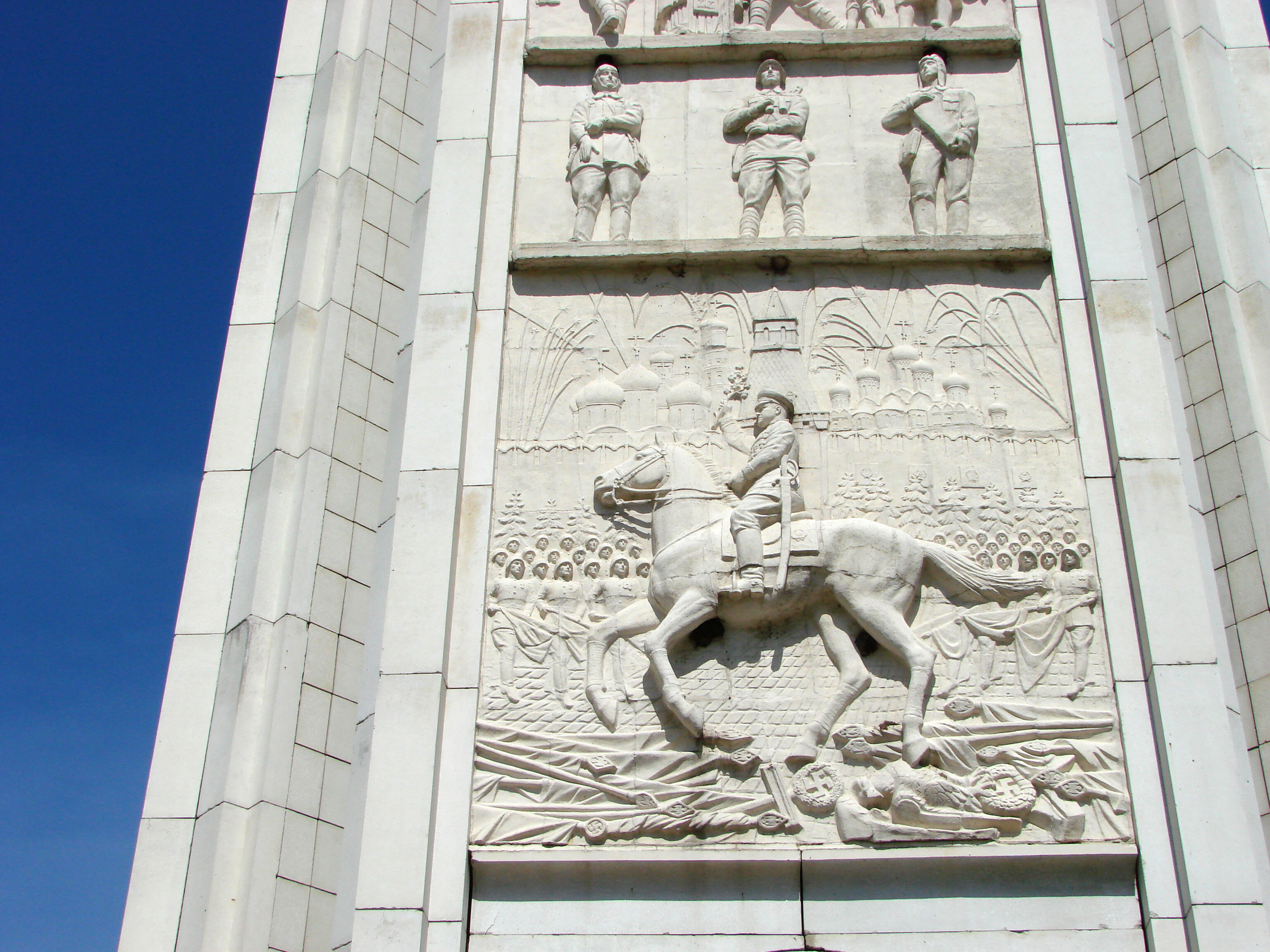
Marshal Zhukov depicted on Victory Memorial facade, Prokhorovka
