= Prokhorovsky District =

Prokhorovsky District Прохоровский район (Russian)
- District
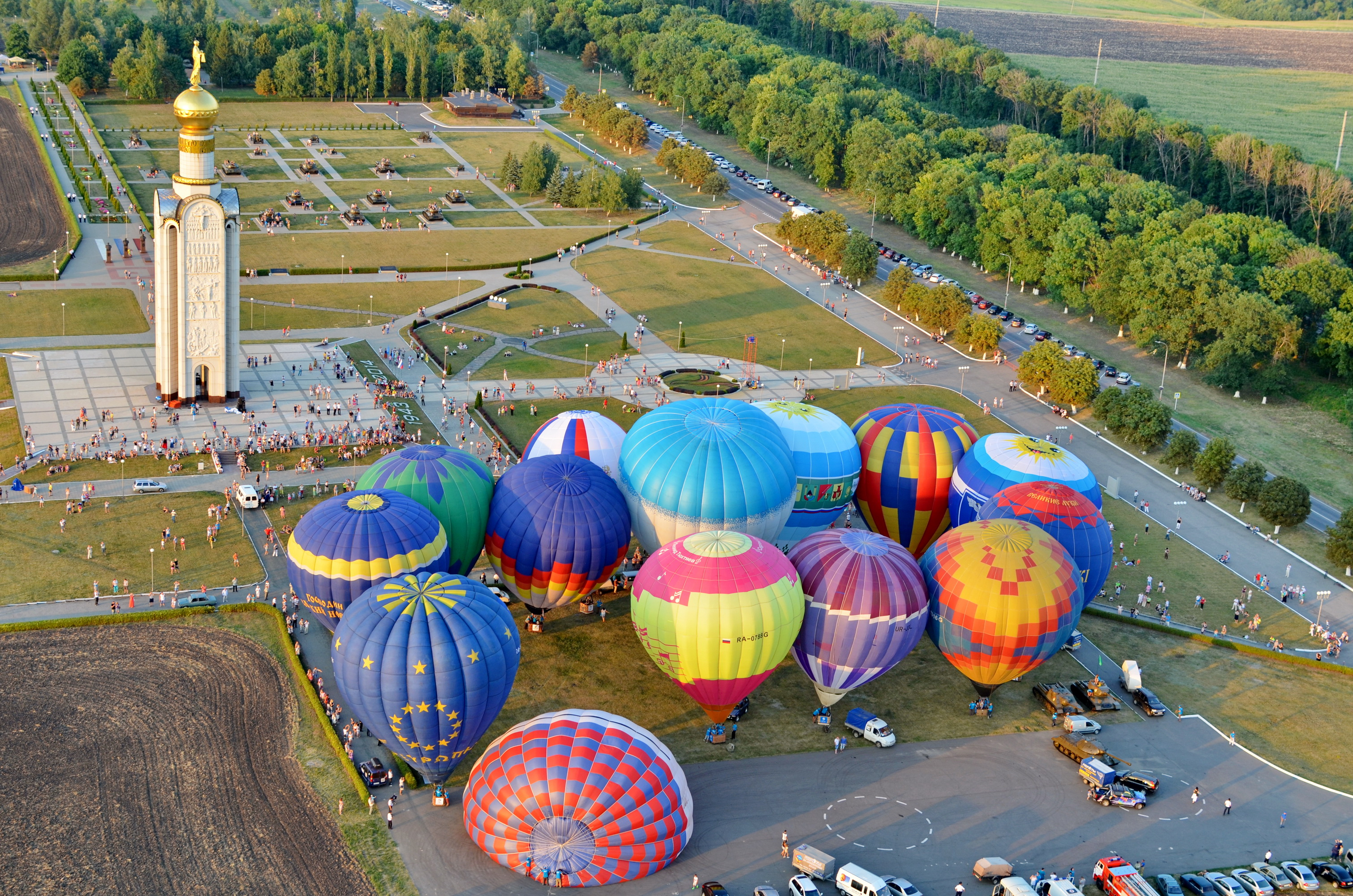
- Parade balloons, Prokhorovka Battlefield, Prokhorovsky District

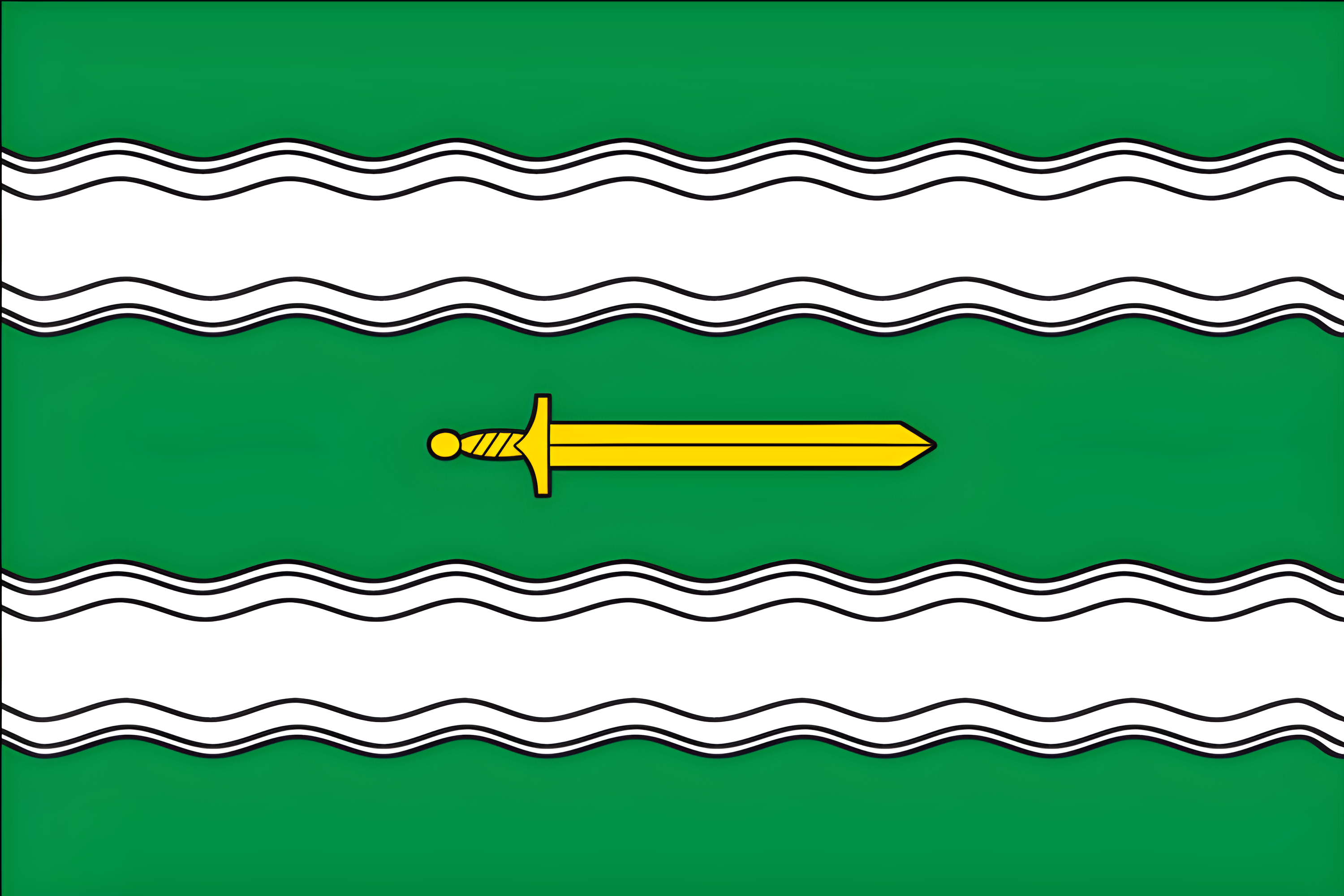
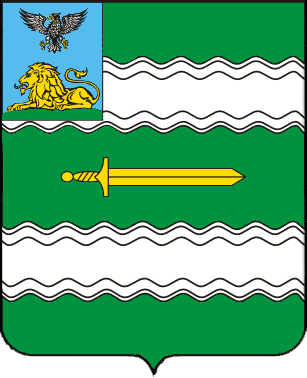
- Flag Coat of arms
- Location of Prokhorovsky District in Belgorod Oblast
- Coordinates: 51°02′N 36°44′E
- Country: Russia
- Federal subject: Belgorod Oblast
- Established: 1928
- Administrative center: Prokhorovka

Area
  - Total: 1,378.7 km^{2} (532.3 sq mi)

Population (2010 Census)
  - Total: 30,094
  - Density: 21.828/km^{2} (56.534/sq mi)
  - Urban: 32.4%
  - Rural: 67.6%

Administrative structure
  - Inhabited localities: 1 urban-type settlements, 134 rural localities

Municipal structure
  - Municipally incorporated as: Prokhorovsky Municipal District
  - Municipal divisions: 1 urban settlements, 17 rural settlements
- Time zone: UTC+3 (MSK)
- OKTMO ID: 14646000
- Website: http://www.admprohorovka.ru/

Prokhorovsky District (Russian: Про́хоровский райо́н) is an administrative district (raion), one of the twenty-one in Belgorod Oblast, Russia. Municipally, it is incorporated as Prokhorovsky Municipal District. It is located in the north of the oblast. The area of the district is 1,378.7 square kilometers (532.3 sq mi). Its administrative center is the urban locality (a settlement) of Prokhorovka. Population: 27,106 (2021 census); 30,094 (2010 census); 31,847 (2002 Census); 29,505 (1989 Soviet census). The population of Prokhorovka accounts for 36.1% of the district's total population.
