= Battle of Kursk order of battle =

The Battle of Kursk order of battle is a list of the significant units that fought in the Battle of Kursk between July and August 1943.

Units smaller than division size and Soviet aviation divisions are not shown in this order of battle.

== German ==
=== Army Group Centre (Günther von Kluge) ===
==== 2nd Army (Walter Weiß) ====
- VII Corps (Ernst-Eberhard Hell)
  - 26th Infantry Division
  - 68th Infantry Division
  - 75th Infantry Division
  - 88th Infantry Division
- XIII Corps (Erich Straube)
  - 82nd Infantry Division
  - 327th Infantry Division
  - 340th Infantry Division

==== 9th Army (Walther Model) ====
- XX Corps (Rudolf Freiherr von Roman)
  - 45th Infantry Division
  - 72nd Infantry Division
  - 137th Infantry Division
  - 251st Infantry Division
- XLVI Panzer Corps (Hans Zorn)
  - 7th Infantry Division
  - 31st Infantry Division
  - 102nd Infantry Division
  - 258th Infantry Division
- XLVII Panzer Corps (Joachim Lemelsen)
  - 2nd Panzer Division
  - 9th Panzer Division
  - 20th Panzer Division
  - 6th Infantry Division
- XLI Panzer Corps (Josef Harpe)
  - 18th Panzer Division
  - 86th Infantry Division
  - 292nd Infantry Division
- XXIII Corps (Johannes Frießner)
  - 216th Infantry Division
  - 383rd Infantry Division
  - 78th Assault Division
- Army Reserve
  - 4th Panzer Division
  - 10th Panzergrenadier Division
  - 12th Panzer Division

==== 2nd Panzer Army (Erich-Heinrich Clößner) ====
- XXXV Corps (Lothar Rendulic)
  - 34th Infantry Division
  - 56th Infantry Division
  - 262nd Infantry Division
  - 299th Infantry Division
- LIII Corps (Friedrich Gollwitzer)
  - 208th Infantry Division
  - 211th Infantry Division
  - 293rd Infantry Division
  - 25th Panzergrenadier Division
- LV Corps (Erich Jaschke)
  - 110th Infantry Division
  - 134th Infantry Division
  - 296th Infantry Division
  - 339th Infantry Division
- Army Reserve
  - 112th Infantry Division

==== Army Group Reserve ====
- 5th Panzer Division
- 8th Panzer Division

=== Army Group South (Erich von Manstein) ===
==== 4th Panzer Army (Hermann Hoth) ====
- LII Corps (Eugen Ott)
  - 57th Infantry Division
  - 255th Infantry Division
  - 332nd Infantry Division
- XLVIII Panzer Corps (Otto von Knobelsdorff)
  - 3rd Panzer Division
  - 11th Panzer Division
  - Panzergrenadier Division Großdeutschland
  - 167th Infantry Division
- II SS Panzer Corps (Paul Hausser)
  - 1st SS Panzergrenadier Division Leibstandarte SS Adolf Hitler
  - 2nd SS Panzergrenadier Division Das Reich
  - 3rd SS Panzergrenadier Division Totenkopf

==== Army Detachment Kempf (Werner Kempf) ====
- III Panzer Corps (Hermann Breith)
  - 6th Panzer Division
  - 7th Panzer Division
  - 19th Panzer Division
  - 168th Infantry Division
- XI Army Corps (Erhard Raus)
  - 106th Infantry Division
  - 320th Infantry Division
- XLII Corps (Franz Mattenklott)
  - 39th Infantry Division
  - 161st Infantry Division
  - 282nd Infantry Division

==== Army Group Reserve ====
- XXIV Panzer Corps (Walter Nehring)
  - 5th SS Panzergrenadier Division Wiking
  - 17th Panzer Division

=== Luftwaffe ===
- Luftflotte 4 (4th Air Fleet) (Otto Deßloch as both commander-in-chief and chief of staff) - Air support for Army Group South
  - VIII Fliegerkorps (8th Air Corps)
- Luftflotte 6 (6th Air Fleet) (Robert Ritter von Greim as commander-in-chief and Friedrich Kless as chief of staff) - Air support for Army Group Center
  - 1. Flieger Division (1st Air Division)

== Soviet ==
=== Western Front ===
The following units were included in the Western Front, commanded by Colonel General Vasily Sokolovsky.

==== 50th Army ====
The 50th Army was commanded by Lieutenant General Ivan Boldin and included the following units.

- 38th Rifle Corps (Major General Alexey Tereshkov)
  - 17th Rifle Division
  - 326th Rifle Division
  - 413th Rifle Division
- 49th Rifle Division
- 64th Rifle Division
- 212th Rifle Division
- 324th Rifle Division

==== 11th Guards Army ====
The 11th Guards Army was commanded by Lieutenant General Ivan Bagramyan, and included the following units.

- 8th Guards Rifle Corps (Major General Pyotr Malyshev)
  - 11th Guards Rifle Division
  - 26th Guards Rifle Division
  - 83rd Guards Rifle Division
- 16th Guards Rifle Corps (Major General Afanasy Lapshov (killed 13 July), Major General Ivan Fedyunkin from 22 July)
  - 1st Guards Rifle Division
  - 16th Guards Rifle Division
  - 31st Guards Rifle Division
  - 169th Rifle Division
- 36th Guards Rifle Corps (Major General Alexander Ksenofontov)
  - 5th Guards Rifle Division
  - 18th Guards Rifle Division
  - 84th Guards Rifle Division
- 108th Rifle Division
- 217th Rifle Division
- 8th Breakthrough Artillery Corps (Lieutenant General Nikolai Salichko)
  - 3rd Breakthrough Artillery Division
  - 6th Breakthrough Artillery Division
- 14th Artillery Division
- 14th Anti-Aircraft Artillery Division
- 17th Anti-Aircraft Artillery Division
- 48th Anti-Aircraft Artillery Division

==== 1st Air Army ====
The 1st Air Army, commanded by Lieutenant General Mikhail Gromov, included the following units.

- 2nd Assault Aviation Corps (Major General Vasily Stepichev)
- 2nd Fighter Aviation Corps (Lieutenant General Alexey Blagoveshchensky)
- 8th Fighter Aviation Corps (Major General Fyodor Zherebchenko)

==== Front assets ====
The following units were directly subordinated to the front.

- 371st Rifle Division
- 1st Tank Corps (Major General Vasily Butkov)
- 5th Tank Corps (Major General Mikhail Sakhno)

=== Bryansk Front ===
The Bryansk Front was commanded by Colonel General Markian Popov, and consisted of the following units.

==== 3rd Army ====
The 3rd Army was commanded by Lieutenant General Alexander Gorbatov, and included the following units.

- 41st Rifle Corps (Major General Viktor Urbanovich)
  - 235th Rifle Division
  - 308th Rifle Division
  - 380th Rifle Division
- 269th Rifle Division
- 283rd Rifle Division
- 342nd Rifle Division
- 20th Breakthrough Artillery Division
- 24th Anti-Aircraft Artillery Division

==== 61st Army ====
The 61st Army was commanded by Lieutenant General Pavel Belov and included the following units.

- 9th Guards Rifle Corps (Major General Arkady Boreyko)
  - 12th Guards Rifle Division
  - 76th Guards Rifle Division
  - 77th Guards Rifle Division
- 97th Rifle Division
- 110th Rifle Division
- 336th Rifle Division
- 356th Rifle Division
- 415th Rifle Division
- 13th Anti-Aircraft Artillery Division

==== 63rd Army ====
The 63rd Army was commanded by Lieutenant General Vladimir Kolpakchi, and included the following units.

- 35th Rifle Corps (headquarters only, Major General Viktor Zholudev)
- 40th Rifle Corps (headquarters only, Major General Vladimir Kuznetsov)
- 5th Rifle Division
- 41st Rifle Division
- 129th Rifle Division
- 250th Rifle Division
- 287th Rifle Division
- 348th Rifle Division
- 397th Rifle Division
- 28th Anti-Aircraft Artillery Division

==== 15th Air Army ====
The 15th Air Army was commanded by Lieutenant General Nikolai Naumenko, and included the following units.

- 1st Guards Fighter Aviation Corps (Lieutenant General Yevgeny Beletsky)
- 3rd Assault Aviation Corps (Major General Mikhail Gorlachenko)

==== Front Assets ====
The following units were directly subordinated to the front.

- 25th Rifle Corps (Major General Pyotr Pererva)
  - 186th Rifle Division
  - 283rd Rifle Division
  - 362nd Rifle Division
- 1st Guards Tank Corps (Major General Mikhail Panov)
- 2nd Breakthrough Artillery Corps (to 63rd Army, Lieutenant General Mikhail Barsukov)
  - 13th Breakthrough Artillery Division
  - 15th Breakthrough Artillery Division
  - 3rd Guards Mortar Division
- 7th Breakthrough Artillery Corps (to 61st Army, Major General Pavel Korolkov)
  - 16th Breakthrough Artillery Division
  - 17th Breakthrough Artillery Division
  - 2nd Guards Mortar Division

=== Central Front ===
The Central Front was commanded by Army General Konstantin Rokossovsky, and consisted of the following units:

==== 13th Army ====
The 13th Army was commanded by Lieutenant General Nikolai Pukhov, and included the following units:

- 17th Guards Rifle Corps (Lieutenant General Andrei Bondarev)
  - 6th Guards Rifle Division (Major General Dmitry Onuprienko)
  - 70th Guards Rifle Division
  - 75th Guards Rifle Division
- 18th Guards Rifle Corps (Major General Ivan Afonin)
  - 2nd Guards Airborne Division
  - 3rd Guards Airborne Division (Colonel Ivan Konev)
  - 4th Guards Airborne Division
- 15th Rifle Corps (Major General Ivan Lyudnikov)
  - 8th Rifle Division
  - 74th Rifle Division
  - 148th Rifle Division
- 29th Rifle Corps (Major General Afanasy Slyshkin)
  - 15th Rifle Division
  - 81st Rifle Division
  - 307th Rifle Division (Major General Mikhail Yenshin)
- 4th Breakthrough Artillery Corps (Major General Nikolai Ignatov)
  - 5th Breakthrough Artillery Division
  - 12th Breakthrough Artillery Division
  - 5th Guards Mortar Division
- 1st Anti-Aircraft Artillery Division
- 25th Anti-Aircraft Artillery Division

==== 48th Army ====
The 48th Army was commanded by Lieutenant General Prokofy Romanenko, and including the following units:

- 42nd Rifle Corps (Major General Konstantin Kolganov)
  - 16th Rifle Division
  - 202nd Rifle Division
  - 399th Rifle Division
- 73rd Rifle Division
- 137th Rifle Division
- 143rd Rifle Division
- 170th Rifle Division
- 16th Anti-Aircraft Artillery Division

==== 60th Army ====
The 60th Army was commanded by Lieutenant General Ivan Chernyakhovsky and included the following units:

- 24th Rifle Corps (Major General Nikolay Kiryukhin)
  - 42nd Rifle Division
  - 112th Rifle Division
- 30th Rifle Corps (Major General Grigory Lazko)
  - 121st Rifle Division
  - 141st Rifle Division
  - 322nd Rifle Division
- 55th Rifle Division

==== 65th Army ====
The 65th Army was commanded by Lieutenant General Pavel Batov, and was composed of the following units:

- 18th Rifle Corps (Major General Ivan Ivanov)
  - 69th Rifle Division
  - 149th Rifle Division
  - 246th Rifle Division
- 27th Rifle Corps (Major General Filipp Cherokmanov)
  - 60th Rifle Division
  - 193rd Rifle Division
- 37th Guards Rifle Division
- 181st Rifle Division
- 194th Rifle Division
- 354th Rifle Division

==== 70th Army ====
The 70th Army was commanded by Lieutenant General Ivan Galanin, and included the following units:

- 28th Rifle Corps (Major General Alexander Nechayev)
  - 132nd Rifle Division
  - 211th Rifle Division
  - 280th Rifle Division
- 102nd Rifle Division
- 106th Rifle Division
- 140th Rifle Division
- 162nd Rifle Division
- 175th Rifle Division
- 1st Guards Artillery Division
- 12th Anti-Aircraft Artillery Division

==== 2nd Tank Army ====
The 2nd Tank Army was commanded by Lieutenant General Alexey Rodin, who was replaced by Lieutenant General Semyon Bogdanov on 2 August. It consisted of the following units:

- 3rd Tank Corps (Major General Maxim Sinenko)
- 16th Tank Corps (Major General Vasily Grigoryev)

==== 16th Air Army ====
The 16th Air Army was commanded by Lieutenant General Sergei Rudenko, and included the following units:

- 3rd Bomber Aviation Corps (Major General Afanasy Karavatsky)
- 6th Mixed Aviation Corps (Major General Ivan Antoshkin)
- 6th Fighter Aviation Corps (Major General Yevgeny Erlykin)

==== Front Assets ====
The following units were directly subordinated to the front:

- 9th Tank Corps (Major General Semyon Bogdanov)
- 19th Tank Corps (Major General Ivan Vasilyev)
- 10th Anti-Aircraft Artillery Division

=== Voronezh Front (Nikolai Vatutin) ===
==== 6th Guards Army (Ivan Chistyakov) ====
- 22nd Guards Rifle Corps
  - 67th Guards Rifle Division (Colonel Aleksei Baksov)
  - 71st Guards Rifle Division (Colonel Ivan Sivakov)
  - 90th Guards Rifle Division
- 23rd Guards Rifle Corps
  - 51st Guards Rifle Division
  - 52nd Guards Rifle Division
  - 375th Rifle Division
- Independent 89th Guards Rifle Division (Colonel Mikhail Seryugin)

==== 7th Guards Army (Mikhail Shumilov) ====
- 24th Guards Rifle Corps (Major General Nikolai Vasilyev)
  - 15th Guards Rifle Division (Major General Yemelyan Vasilenko)
  - 36th Guards Rifle Division (Major General Mikhail Denisenko)
  - 72nd Guards Rifle Division (Major General Anatoly Losev)
- 25th Guards Rifle Corps (Major General Gany Safiullin)
  - 73rd Guards Rifle Division (Colonel Semyon Kozak)
  - 78th Guards Rifle Division (Colonel Aleksandr Skvortsov)
  - 81st Guards Rifle Division (Colonel Ivan Morozov)
- Independent 213th Rifle Division (Colonel Ivan Buslayev)

==== 38th Army (Nikandr Chibisov) ====
- 50th Rifle Corps
  - 167th Rifle Division
  - 232nd Rifle Division
  - 340th Rifle Division
- 51st Rifle Corps (Petr Avdeenko)
  - 180th Rifle Division
  - 240th Rifle Division
- Independent 204th Rifle Division

==== 40th Army (Kirill Moskalenko) ====
- 47th Rifle Corps (Afanasy Gryaznov)
  - 161st Rifle Division (Major General Pyotr Tertyshny)
  - 206th Rifle Division (Colonel Viktor Rutko)
  - 237th Rifle Division (Major General Pyotr Dyakonov)
- 52nd Rifle Corps (Frants Perkhorovich)
  - 100th Rifle Division (Colonel Nikolai Bezzubov (mw), Colonel Pyotr Tsygankov)
  - 219th Rifle Division (Major General Vasily Kotelnikov)
  - 309th Rifle Division (Colonel Dmitry Dryomin)
- Independent 184th Rifle Division (Colonel Samuil Tsukarev)

==== 69th Army (Vasily Kryuchenkin) ====
- 48th Rifle Corps (Major General Zinovy Rogozny)
  - 107th Rifle Division (Colonel Pyotr Bezhko)
  - 183rd Rifle Division (Major General Aleksandr Kostitsyn)
  - 305th Rifle Division (Colonel Aleksandr Vasilyev)
- 49th Rifle Corps (Major General Gury Terentyev)
  - 111th Rifle Division (Colonel Mikhail Bushin)
  - 270th Rifle Division (Colonel Ivan Belyayev)

==== 1st Tank Army (Mikhail Katukov) ====
- 6th Tank Corps (Andrei Getman)
- 31st Tank Corps
- 3rd Mechanized Corps (Semyon Krivoshein)

==== 2nd Air Army (Stepan Krasovsky) ====
- 1st Bombing Aviation Corps
- 1st Assault Aviation Corps
- 4th Fighter Aviation Corps
- 5th Fighter Aviation Corps

==== Front Assets ====
- 35th Guards Rifle Corps
  - 92nd Guards Rifle Division
  - 93rd Guards Rifle Division
  - 94th Guards Rifle Division
- 2nd Guards Tank Corps
- 5th Guards Tank Corps

=== Steppe Front ===
The following units were part of the Steppe Front, commanded by Ivan Konev. The front was formed from the Steppe Military District on 9 July, to serve as a reserve if the German attack broke through and to provide fresh troops for a counterattack to begin as soon as the German attack was halted. This order of battle does not show the complete composition of the Steppe Front. In addition to the units listed below, there were also the 4th Guards, 27th, 47th and 53rd Armies. The 4th Guards, 27th, 47th, and the 53rd Armies were held in reserve during the battle and thus did not participate. The 5th Guards Army and the 5th Guards Tank Army were both committed to the counterattack in the Battle of Prokhorovka, where they fought as part of the Voronezh Front.

==== 5th Guards Army ====
The following units were part of the 5th Guards Army, commanded by Lieutenant General Alexey Zhadov. The 10th Tank Corps was directly subordinated to the front on 7 July and became part of the 1st Tank Army on 8 July. Also on 8 July, the 5th Guards Army was transferred to the Voronezh Front.

- 32nd Guards Rifle Corps (Major General Aleksandr Rodimtsev)
  - 13th Guards Rifle Division (Major General Gleb Baklanov)
  - 66th Guards Rifle Division (Major General Akim Yakshin)
  - 6th Guards Airborne Division (Colonel Mikhail Smirnov)
- 33rd Guards Rifle Corps (Major General Iosif Popov)
  - 95th Guards Rifle Division (Colonel Andrey Lyakhov)
  - 97th Guards Rifle Division(Colonel Ivan Antsiferov)
  - 9th Guards Airborne Division (Colonel Aleksandr Sazonov)
- Independent 42nd Guards Rifle Division
- Independent 10th Tank Corps (Major General Vasily Burkov)
- Independent 29th Anti-Aircraft Artillery Division

==== 5th Guards Tank Army ====
The 5th Guards Tank Army consisted of the following units, under the command of Lieutenant General Pavel Rotmistrov. The 18th Tank Corps joined the army from the Reserve of the High Command on 7 July. The army was transferred to the Voronezh Front on 11 July.

- 5th Guards Mechanized Corps (Major General Boris Skvortsov)
- 18th Tank Corps (Major General Boris Bakharov)
- 29th Tank Corps (Major General Ivan Kirichenko)
- Independent 6th Anti-Aircraft Artillery Division

==== 5th Air Army ====
The 5th Air Army included the following units, and was commanded by Lieutenant General Sergei Goryunov. It entered combat in mid-July.

- 7th Mixed Aviation Corps (Major General Pyotr Arkhangelsky)
- 8th Mixed Aviation Corps (Major General Nikolai Kamanin)
- 3rd Fighter Aviation Corps (Major General Yevgeny Savitsky)
- 7th Fighter Aviation Corps (Major General Aleksandr Utin)
