= Greatest Tank Battles =

- Genre: Documentary; War
- Starring: Robin Ward (narrator)
- Composer: Richard Pell
- Country of origin: Canada
- Original language: English
- No. of seasons: 3
- No. of episodes: 26

Production
- Executive producer: Jack Smith
- Producers: Ira Levy; Peter Williamson
- Production companies: Breakthrough Entertainment; Canwest

Original release
- Network: History Television (Canada); Military Channel (US)
- Release: 4 January 2010 – 3 December 2013

Greatest Tank Battles is a military documentary series currently airing on History Television and National Geographic Channel in Canada, where it premiered on 4 January 2010. The series was subsequently picked up in the United States by the Military Channel, where it premiered on 5 January 2011. The second season premiered in Canada on 17 January 2011. The show is also broadcast on Discovery Networks throughout Europe, the Middle East, and Africa. Other countries where the show has signed broadcast deals include India (Fox International Channels) and China (LIC Beijing), with a DVD deal in Australia (Beyond Distribution).

The series is currently available for streaming online for free viewing on Pluto TV, Tubi, YouTube (via the Breakthrough Entertainment channel), Crackle and Freevee.

== Presentation ==
The battles in each episode are illustrated through a combination of 3D CGI reenactments, and when possible includes interviews with participants from both sides of the battle. Military historians and other experts provide analysis of the tactics employed and the battlefield decisions made. Detailed statistics on the equipment and vehicles used are also presented, along with background information on the historical circumstances leading to the featured battle, and its aftermath.

== Series overview ==
Season	Episodes	Originally released	
Season	Episodes	First released	Last released
1	10	January 4, 2010	March 8, 2010
2	10	January 17, 2011	March 21, 2011
3	6	November 17, 2013	December 3, 2013

== Episodes ==
=== Season 1 ===
No. overall	No. in season	Title	Original release date (Canada)	Original release date (US)
1	1	"The Battle of 73 Easting"	4 January 2010	5 January 2011
The 1991 Gulf War's Battle of 73 Easting is the most studied tank battle of modern times. This is the story of how the American 2nd Armored Cavalry Regiment used superior equipment and training to overcome a blinding sandstorm and hundreds of tanks manned by Iraq's elite Republican Guard.
2	2	"The October War: Battle for the Golan Heights"	11 January 2010	12 January 2011
In 1973, Syria launches a surprise attack against Israel in the Golan Heights. This is a story of survival, where a few out-numbered tankers manage to hold off an enemy of overwhelming size in one of the greatest tank battles ever waged.
3	3	"The Battle of El Alamein"	18 January 2010	19 January 2011
In 1942, Rommel's Afrika Corps faces off against Montgomery's Eighth Army. This is the story of the climax in the struggle for North Africa, which would change the course of the Second World War.
4	4	"The Battle of the Bulge: Race to Bastogne"	25 January 2010	26 January 2011
In December 1944, German forces launch a surprise attack through the Ardennes Forest in Belgium. This is the story of the American tankers who helped defend the American line against Hitler's final gamble on the western front.
5	5	"The Battle for the Hochwald Gap"	1 February 2010	2 February 2011
In February 1945, the First Canadian Army launches an attack to cross the Rhine and enter the German heartland. This is the story of the struggle for the Hochwald Gap – the final obstacle blocking the Allies, which the Germans are determined to hold at any cost.
6	6	"The Battle of the Bulge: SS Panzers Attack!"	8 February 2010	9 February 2011
In December 1944, an infamous SS tank force leads Hitler's final offensive in the west. This is the story of the 6th Panzer Army's incredible breakthrough of the American line and subsequent encirclement and defeat.
7	7	"The Battle of Normandy"	15 February 2010	16 February 2011
On June 6, 1944, the Allies land on the northern coast of France. This is the story of the 2nd Canadian Armoured Brigade as they fight their way inland against a stubborn and ruthless German defence.
8	8	"The Battle of Arracourt"	22 February 2010	13 February 2011
By September 1944, Patton's hard-charging Third Army threatens to breach the German border. This is the story of the largest tank-vs-tank clash of the Western Front, as Hitler masses hundreds of panzers in a desperate bid to halt Patton's advance.
9	9	"The Battle of Kursk: Northern Front"	1 March 2010	2 March 2011
In the summer of 1943, Hitler launches a massive armoured offensive in an effort to regain the upper hand on the Eastern Front. This is the story of the formidable Russian defense that stalls a massive panzer onslaught on the Northern shoulder of the Kursk salient.
10	10	"The Battle of Kursk: Southern Front"	8 March 2010	9 March 2011
The Battle of Kursk comes to a climax at the Battle of Prokhorovka on July 12, 1943. This is the story of the largest tank battle in military history, as elite SS troops face off against Russian defenders determined to stop them whatever the cost.

=== Season 2 ===
No. overall	No. in season	Title	Original release date (Canada)	Original release date (US)
11	1	"Tank Battles Of The Great War"	17 January 2011	1 February 2012
In 1916 the British debut a new mobile weapon, hoping to break the long bloody stalemate on the Western Front. This is the story of the first tanks and how they change the face of the modern battlefield forever
12	2	"Tank Battles of Korea"	24 January 2011	18 January 2012
In 1950 the world is caught off guard as North Korea launches a massive armoured assault into South Korea. This is the story of the American tankers who rush to the aid of the South and the bloody battles they fight up and down the Korean Peninsula.
13	3	"The Battle of France"	31 January 2011	11 January 2012
At the outset of World War II, the Germans pioneer a new form of mobile armoured warfare. This is the story of the famed Nazi Blitzkrieg, as thousands of panzers burst through terrain thought impassable to conquer Western Europe in a matter of weeks.
14	4	"The Six Day War: Battle for the Sinai"	7 February 2011	7 March 2012
In 1967, in response to a growing threat by her Arab neighbours, Israel launches a pre-emptive strike against Egypt in the Sinai. This is the story of one of the swiftest and most dramatic victories in modern warfare.
15	5	"The Battle for the Baltics"	14 February 2011	22 February 2012
By 1944, the Soviets have turned the tide of war in the East and are pursuing the Nazi army back through the Baltic States. This is the story of the German tankers who continue to fight and win the battles even though they cannot win the war.
16	6	"The Battle of Stalingrad"	21 February 2011	29 February 2012
By late 1942, the German offensive on the Eastern Front begins to stall and the Soviets make their stand in the city of Stalingrad. This is the story of the most infamous battle in history, as an entire German army is lost and the course of the war forever changed.
17	7	"Tank Ace: Ludwig Bauer"	28 February 2011	15 February 2012
After the success of the Blitzkrieg, men across Germany flocked to the armoured corps in search of glory. This is the story of one German tanker as he comes face to face with the harsh realities of armoured warfare. Highly decorated Ludwig Bauer fought in several of WWII's greatest tank battles.
18	8	"The October War: Battle for the Sinai"	7 March 2011	14 March 2012
Eager to regain territory lost six years earlier, Egypt launches a surprise attack against Israel in October 1973. This is the story of the final Arab-Israeli war in the Sinai, where both sides enjoy remarkable success, suffer stunning defeat, and gain – most importantly – lasting peace.
19	9	"The Battle of Tunisia"	14 March 2011	25 January 2012
By 1942, Rommel's Afrika Corps has been pushed back to Tunisia and the brash new US tank force lands in North Africa. This is the story of the final North African battles as two of history's most famed tank commanders - Patton and Rommel - go head to head.
20	10	"Tank Battles of Italy"	21 March 2011	8 February 2012
In 1943, tanks of the Royal Canadian Armoured Corps make their combat debut on the European mainland. This is the story of the Canadian tankers who fight their way up the Italian peninsula in the push to liberate Rome from Nazi occupation.

=== Season 3 ===
No. overall	No. in season	Title	Original release date (Canada)	Original release date (US)
21	1	"The Canadian Tank Battle in Italy"	17 November 2013	24 November 2013
May 1944: Canadian tanks begin their final push to drive the Germans from Italy. At each step, over rugged mountains and through steep valleys, the Canadians confront Hitler's elite Panzers - at the Melfa river, on the Trasimene Line, in the formidable Gothic Line, finally battering their way into the Po Valley.
22	2	"Michael Wittman - Greatest Tank Ace"	22 December 2013	29 December 2013
Michael Wittmann, the most decorated tank ace in history, fought at Kursk and in Normandy and in many of the greatest tank battles of all time. An officer in the notorious Waffen SS, hailed as a hero by the Nazis, Wittmann remains a focus of cult and controversy.
23	3	"Vietnam Insurgency"	19 November 2013	26 November 2013
1965: American ground forces and Marine Corps tanks land in South Vietnam, confident that they will defeat the Communist insurgency, until they encounter the Viet Cong and the North Vietnamese Army.
24	4	"The Tank Battles of the Pacific"	10 December 2013	17 December 2013
By 1942, the Japanese Empire stretched halfway across the Pacific Ocean. This is the rarely told story of the key role played by US Marine tanks in the Pacific Campaign. They fight bloody battles against fanatical Japanese forces that defend the now infamous Islands of Guadalcanal, Tarawa, Saipan, Iwo Jima and Okinawa.
25	5	"Vietnam Armoured Attack"	26 November 2013	3 December 2013
1968: The Americans mobilise hundreds of tanks to help defeat Communist forces in South Vietnam. Now the Communists combine guerrilla tactics with conventional military might and send their own tanks into battle. The final struggle for Vietnam begins.
26	6	"The Battle For Germany"	3 December 2013	10 December 2013
In 1944 the US 3rd Armoured Division spearheads the Allied push from the western border of Germany towards Berlin. The American tankers battle fanatical Germans defending their homeland to the last, armed with the most powerful Panzers ever to take the battlefield.

== In other side media ==
Greatest Tank Battles has been adapted as an iPhone app.

== Reception ==
The Canadian series premiere which aired at 8 pm ET/PT had 348,000 viewers with 178,000 viewers in the A25–54 demographic and 147,000 viewers in the A18–49 category.

== See also ==
- The History Channel
- Dogfights (TV series)
