= 213th Rifle Division =

- Active: 1941–1946
- Country: Soviet Union
- Branch: Red Army
- Type: Infantry
- Role: Motorized Infantry
- Size: Division
- Engagements: World War II
- Battle honours: Novoukrainka

Commanders
- Notable commanders: Ivan Buslayev

The 213th Rifle Division (Russian: 213-я стрелковая дивизия) was formed as an infantry division of the Red Army during World War II after a motorized division of that same number was destroyed about seven weeks following the start of the German invasion of the Soviet Union.

== 213th Motorized Division ==
This division began forming in March-April 1941 in the Kiev Special Military District as part of the 19th Mechanized Corps. Col. Vasilii Mikhailovich Osminskii was appointed to command on March 11 and he would remain in this position until the division was disbanded. Once formed its order of battle was as follows:

- 702nd Motorized Rifle Regiment
- 739th Motorized Rifle Regiment
- 132nd Tank Regiment
- 671st Artillery Regiment
- 39th Antitank Battalion
- 205th Antiaircraft Battalion
- 301st Reconnaissance Battalion
- 387th Light Engineering Battalion
- 599th Signal Battalion
- 211th Artillery Park Battalion
- 373rd Medical/Sanitation Battalion
- 697th Motor Transport Battalion
- 152nd Repair and Restoration Battalion
- 39th Regulatory Company
- 483rd Chemical Defense (Anti-gas) Company
- 718th Field Postal Station
- 537th Field Office of the State Bank

The 132nd had only one battalion of 42 T-26 tanks and while the 301st was equipped with a company of 13 T-37 tankettes it had no armored cars or motorcycles. The 671st had only one battery of four 122mm howitzers and the 205th only one battery of four 37mm guns.

=== Battles of Brody and Uman ===
When Operation Barbarossa began on June 22 the 19th Mechanized Corps (40th and 43rd Tank Divisions, 213th Motorized Division, 21st Motorcycle Regiment) was under the direct command of the redesignated Southwestern Front. The 213th was positioned at Vinnytsia with the tank divisions deployed northward as far as Zhytomyr. At this time the division was at close to full strength in manpower, with 10,021 personnel assigned, but had only 140 trucks of all types on hand, making it "motorized" in name only. In addition to the ongoing shortages in heavy equipment the rifle regiments had only about half of their authorized machine guns and mortars and the division had no antitank guns at all. Within 48 hours of the German invasion it was being identified in Soviet sources as an ordinary rifle division. By this time it had been detached to Operational Group Lukin which was protecting a large Red Army supply base at Shepetivka.

By day's end on June 24 the 40th Tank Division had advanced as far west as Hoshcha and was followed by the 213th which had entered Rivne by the end of June 27. The 13th Panzer Division had broken through 40th Tanks near Mlyniv earlier that day with Rivne as its immediate objective. In fighting over the next two days the III Motorized Corps drove the two tank divisions back to the east beyond Hoshcha but at the same time the XXXXVIII Motorized Corps forced the 213th off to the southeast as it advanced on Ostriv. By this time the 19th Mechanized Corps had come under command of 5th Army in Southwestern Front, but in its scattered condition effective command and control was largely impossible. As of July 7 what remained of the division was located roughly 30km south of Shepetivka, facing the 16th Panzer and 111th Infantry Divisions. On July 10 the division was further weakened when its 132nd Tank Regiment (never actually more than a battalion) was detached to the Kiev Fortified Sector.

As Army Group South reached this objective in mid-July the 213th was still resisting in the Berdychiv area. By the beginning of August the division had been detached from 19th Mechanized and was subordinated to 6th Army of Southern Front. At this time the 6th was in the process of being encircled in the Uman Pocket along with the 12th Army and by August 8 the division was effectively destroyed, being officially stricken from the Red Army order of battle on September 19.

== History ==
The 213th Rifle Division began forming on 15 December 1941 at Kattakurgan, assigned to the Central Asian Military District. It was commanded by Major General Pyotr Shevchenko. The 213th included the 585th, 702nd, and 693rd Rifle Regiments, the 671st Artillery Regiment, and the 387th Sapper Battalion, along with other smaller units. It remained in the district until early 1943, guarding the Soviet–Afghan border near Kerki and Termez. The 213th was transferred to the Reserve of the Supreme High Command (RVGK) on 25 February of that year. In mid-March, it joined the 64th Army (soon to become the 7th Guards Army) of the Voronezh Front and was sent to the Gremyachye area. At the end of March, its units fought in fierce offensive battles to seize the railway station of Kreyda, then in April and May, as part of the 25th Guards Rifle Corps of the army, defended the line of the Seversky Donets near Belgorod. Shevchenko was sent to the rear for treatment of an illness in June and was replaced by Colonel Ivan Buslayev.

The 213th fought against the attacks of the 4th Panzer Army and Army Detachment Kempf during the Battle of Kursk in July. Remaining with the 7th Guards Army for the Soviet offensive that began in August, it transferred to the 37th Army of the 2nd Ukrainian Front in November after the Battle of the Dnieper. The division spent most of 1944 with the 48th Rifle Corps of the 52nd Army. After advancing through Romania in August and September of that year, the 52nd Army transferred to the RVGK and was moved north to join the 1st Ukrainian Front by November. With the 52nd Army, the division fought in the Vistula–Oder Offensive in January, the Upper Silesian Offensive in March, the Siege of Breslau, and the Prague Offensive in May.

After the end of the war, from late June, the 52nd Army was withdrawn to Poland and then to western Ukraine. Later that year, the 213th was stationed at Lvov, still with the 48th Rifle Corps. When the headquarters of the 52nd Army became that of the 8th Tank Army on 12 June 1946, the division was disbanded with its corps.
