= 160th Rifle Division (1940 formation) =

160th Rifle Division (July 16, 1940 - April 18, 1943)
- Active: 1940–1943
- Country: Soviet Union
- Branch: Red Army
- Type: Infantry
- Size: Division
- Engagements: Operation Barbarossa; Siege of Mogilev; Operation Typhoon; Battle of Bryansk (1941); Kursk-Oboyan Operation; Case Blue; Operation Little Saturn; Ostrogozhsk–Rossosh offensive Voronezh–Kastornoye offensive Operation Star; Third Battle of Kharkov

Commanders
- Notable commanders: Maj. Gen. Ivan Mikhailovich Skugarev; Col. Mikhail Borisovich Anashkin; Col. Mikhail Petrovich Seryugin; Col. Aleksei Ivanovich Baksov

The 1940 formation of the 160th Rifle Division was an infantry division of the Red Army, formed as part of the prewar buildup of forces, based on the shtat (table of organization and equipment) of September 13, 1939. The division completed its formation at Gorki in the Moscow Military District and at the time of the German invasion of the Soviet Union was in the same area, assigned to the 20th Rifle Corps in the Reserve of the Supreme High Command. It was moved west by rail to join the 13th Army of Western Front in the first days of July 1941 in the Mogilev area. At the end of the month the division was assigned to the reserves of Central Front before becoming part of Operations Group Akimenko in the reserves of Bryansk Front. In mid-September it was encircled and forced to break out; in the process it lost its commanding officer, much of its command staff and so many men and heavy weapons that it was briefly written off. Its number was reallocated to the 6th Moscow Militia Division and for the next 18 months there were two 160th Rifle Divisions serving concurrently. By the start of Operation Typhoon at the end of September it was in Operations Group Ermakov; while falling back to southwest of Kursk it managed to avoid encirclement but remained barely combat-effective due to its heavy losses.

The 1940 formation went into reserve at the end of November and was rebuilt to the December 1941 shtat. At the end of December it returned to the fighting in 40th Army of Southwestern Front in the Voronezh area where it remained for most of 1942, after July in 6th Army of Voronezh Front. Under this command it took part in the winter counteroffensives against the Axis forces west of the Don River, eventually as part of 3rd Tank Army in Operation Star which liberated Kharkov. It was then caught up in the German counteroffensive that retook the city and was again badly mauled, but had performed with enough distinction in difficult conditions that it was redesignated as the 89th Guards Rifle Division on April 18, 1943.

== Formation ==
The division actually started forming at Astrakhan in the North Caucasus Military District in August 1939 but was not considered complete until after it was moved to Gorki in July 1940, with the final steps completed the following month. As of June 1941 it had the following order of battle:

- 443rd Rifle Regiment
- 537th Rifle Regiment
- 636th Rifle Regiment
- 566th Light Artillery Regiment
- 290th Antitank Battalion
- 406th Antiaircraft Battery (later 459th Antiaircraft Battalion)
- 499th Machine Gun Battalion (from October 10, 1942)
- 186th Reconnaissance Battalion
- 266th Sapper Battalion
- 657th Signal Company (later 176th Signal Battalion)
- 191st Medical/Sanitation Battalion
- 262nd Chemical Defense (Anti-gas) Company
- 661st Motor Transport Company
- 149th Field Bakery (later 424th Motorized Field Bakery)
- 512th Field Postal Station
- 437th Field Office of the State Bank

Maj. Gen. Ivan Mikhailovich Skugarev was appointed to command on July 16, 1940. This officer had previously commanded the 37th Rifle Division before being arrested in September 1937 during the Great Purge. He was imprisoned for a year before being released to serve as a senior instructor at the Military Economics Academy. He was still in command at the start of Operation Barbarossa and the division was fortunate to still be in the Gorki area well to the east of the frontier. At this time it was assigned, with the 137th Rifle Division, to the 20th Rifle Corps under direct command of the Reserve of the Supreme High Command.

== Battles for Mogilev and Bryansk ==
20th Rifle Corps, which now included the 132nd Rifle Division, was officially assigned to 13th Army on July 10. The first trains carrying the 160th began arriving and offloading at Chavusy and nearby stations east of Mogilev on July 12/13, being subjected to German air attacks in the process. By this time the 2nd Panzer Group had forced crossings of the Dniepr north and south of Mogilev and by the end of July 15 the city was encircled, albeit loosely, and largely cut off from the remainder of 13th Army. The Army commander, Lt. Gen. V. F. Gerasimenko, and his staff managed to escape eastward to begin establishing a new defense along the Sozh River. By the end of the next day the 20th Corps itself was facing the prospect of encirclement by the XXIV Panzer Corps and was falling back to the Sozh with the 160th farthest east.

In the chaos of arrival, offloading and reorganization while under attack the division was already badly scattered. General Skugarev was attempting to defend Chavusy with part of his forces while the 537th Rifle Regiment attempted to hold along the Resta River before being bypassed on both sides and ordered to retreat. After Chavusy was lost Skugarev attempted to get his men back across the Sozh at Krychaw, a task made immensely complicated by an almost total breakdown in communications. The 160th was able to hold out along this line until August 4 when it was ordered back east of Gomel to the reserves of Central Front for replenishment. In just these few weeks of fighting the 443rd Rifle Regiment had been largely destroyed, the 566th Artillery Regiment and the 290th Antitank Battalion had lost most of their guns, and the division as a whole was down to 5,000 of its initial 14,000 personnel.

After the move to the Novobelitskiy district the division came under the direct command of Central Front. The Front's mission was to protect the junction between the Western and Southwestern Fronts. While rebuilding the 868th Rifle Regiment of the 287th Rifle Division was transferred to the 160th and renumbered as the new 443rd Regiment. Bryansk Front was created on August 16 and by August 30 the division had been transferred to this Front, serving as part of Operational Group Akimenko, which was under the command of Maj. Gen. A. Z. Akimenko and also included the 127th Rifle Division and the 753rd Antitank Regiment. On that date the STAVKA ordered the Front to attack with all its forces towards Roslavl and Starodub to destroy the German forces in the Pochep area and then exploit toward Krychaw and Propoisk. While these orders were utterly unrealistic and resulted in failure, in the first days of September the 127th Division, which was positioned south of Dorogobuzh, began moving south and took part in the Yelnya offensive. Meanwhile, the 160th remained in place.

In the last days of August the bulk of the 2nd Panzer Group and the 2nd Army began moving south in a movement that would lead to the Kiev encirclement. Group Akimenko was on the south flank of Bryansk Front west of Rylsk and well out of the direct path; however, the Front commander, Lt. Gen. A. I. Yeryomenko, was under pressure from the STAVKA to divert German strength and therefore continued to order effectively suicidal attacks to the west. Yeryomenko's task was further complicated when the 17th Panzer Division captured Glukhov on September 9, shattering the communications between the armies of the Front. The 160th was caught up in this fighting and largely encircled. In the effort to break out the division took heavy casualties and on September 18 General Skugarev was taken prisoner. This officer would remain in German PoW camps for the duration of the war; after the German surrender he was briefly arrested before being released and returning to service up to his retirement in 1947.

In the chaos that had been enfolding the Red Army since the invasion the 160th was briefly understood as having been destroyed, especially given the loss of its commander and much of its command cadre. On September 26 its number was reassigned to the 6th Moscow Militia Division (Dzerzhinskii) which was in the 24th Army reserves. However, on September 20 Col. Mikhail Borisovich Anashkin was moved from the position of chief of staff of the 282nd Rifle Division to command the remnants of the 160th and as of October 1 it was rebuilding in Operational Group Ermakov, still in Bryansk Front. With the permission of the STAVKA Yeryomenko ordered the Front's forces to go over to the defense as of 1330 hours on September 28, with the indication that "within the next several days an enemy offensive toward Bryansk and toward Sevsk or L'gov must be expected." At this time Group Ermakov numbered 33,562 men and had 103 tanks and 132 guns and mortars, although it isn't clear if this includes the casualties suffered on September 27, which amounted to 4,913 men killed, wounded or missing.

=== Operation Typhoon ===
The expected offensive began on September 30 before any effective defensive measures could be taken. Group Ermakov faced the 17th and 18th Panzer Divisions of the XLVII Panzer Corps. Sevsk fell on October 1 and the panzers began exploiting along the Oryol axis. The next morning Yeryomenko was in communication with Stalin and proposed to launch an attack on the flanks of the breach with the 307th and 121st Rifle Divisions and 55th Cavalry Division from the north and from the south with the 2nd Guards (formerly 127th) and 160th Rifle Divisions in the direction of Lokot Station, Esman and Svessa. Stalin agreed with the plan and promised two tank brigades and two rifle divisions by way of Oryol. In the circumstances the 160th and 2nd Guards had insufficient strength for this task and General Ermakov was moving back to Rylsk, out of communication except by liaison aircraft. Further orders on October 3 demanded that 2nd Guards attack regardless while the 160th took over its sector and remained in place.

By October 5 the division was located west of Oryol after the 4th Panzer Division had seized the city and the XLVII Panzer Corps was driving north between there and Bryansk in the process of encircling the 13th and 3rd Armies. Two days later it fell back toward the northeast as the advance of 4th Panzer stalled along the road to Mtsensk. By the middle of the month it had retreated to the southwest of Kursk, still under command of 13th Army. Near the end of November it was reassigned to 40th Army in Southwestern Front, where it would remain through the following months as it was rebuilt to the December 1941 shtat. This involved converting the 566th to a standard divisional artillery regiment, changing the 186th Reconnaissance Battalion to a company, and gathering together most of the rifle regiments' mortars to form the 532nd Mortar Battalion. During this period 40th Army was stationed in the Voronezh area.

== Case Blue ==
During April 1942 the 40th Army was moved to the reformed Bryansk Front. The 160th was still under these commands near the end of June when the German summer offensive began. It was positioned north of Tim and when the attack began on June 28 the XLVIII Panzer Corps struck at the boundary between it and the 121st Rifle Division, driving the latter off to the north. XLVIII Panzer Corps fielded roughly 325 tanks while 40th Army had only about 250 in its entire sector. The 160th and the 212th Rifle Division to its south faced the 24th Panzer Division with the Großdeutschland Division escheloned to its left which jointly destroyed their defenses before advancing 16 km to the Tim River where the 24th Panzer seized a railroad bridge intact.

40th Army's commander, Maj. Gen. M. A. Parsegov, reported that his divisions had suffered "significant losses" but "had not lost their combat capabilities" while urgently requesting assistance from his Front commander. On June 29 the 160th dug in along the Kshen River where it soon came under attack by the 9th Panzer Division of XXIV Panzer Corps. This was already nearly 30 km behind the lines held by the Army when the offensive began and the 121st Division was currently in complete disarray. By now the 160th, along with the 212th, 45th and 62nd Rifle Divisions, had been loosely pocketed west of Stary Oskol between the XLVIII Panzer and the VIII Army Corps. Over the following days the 160th fell back from the Kshen to the Olym River with the assistance of the fresh 284th Rifle Division defending along this river north and south of Kastornoye.

By late on July 1 the situation facing 40th Army and its neighbors to the south was producing consternation within the STAVKA. Overnight the Front headquarters belatedly authorized Parsegov to pull his left wing back to the Olym and Oskol Rivers but this had to be carried out "under conditions of the complete absence of control on the part of 40th Army's commander and staff, who by this time were already situated in Voronezh." Early on July 3 Parsegov was replaced by Lt. Gen. M. M. Popov who scrambled to create a defense for the city. Meanwhile, Stalin authorized the deployment of four reserve armies to the region, including the 6th Reserve which would be redesignated as the 6th Army on July 10 and was moving to positions along the Don River south of Voronezh. During July 4 the 160th made its way to this river, moving perilously between the spearheads of 9th Panzer and 3rd Motorized Divisions and two days later it formed a tentative line along the Treshchevka River to hold back the latter. During the following week its remnants managed to cross the Don north of Voronezh before making its way south of the city and joining 6th Army while taking up positions along the Voronezh River. While as many as half of 40th Army's personnel successfully reached and crossed the Don the 160th was one of the few units that still existed as organized combat formations.

== Operation Little Saturn ==
The situation around Voronezh soon became a stalemate as the German mobile forces were required to push eastward toward Stalingrad. As of the beginning of August 6 Army was part of the newly formed Voronezh Front. On August 19 Colonel Anashkin was moved to command of the 159th (later 61st Guards) Rifle Division; he would eventually reach the rank of lieutenant general, would command several rifle corps and be made a Hero of the Soviet Union before his retirement in 1946. He was replaced the next day by Col. Mikhail Petrovich Seryugin who had been serving as the deputy commander of the 212th Rifle Division.

At the start of December, after the German 6th Army had been encircled at Stalingrad, the 160th was still under the same commands in much the same area along the Don. The planning for Operation Saturn, which had begun in late November, had included the Soviet 6th Army of Voronezh Front operating jointly with Southwestern Front to penetrate the defenses of the Italian 8th Army, reach the Kantemirovka region, and protect the right flank of that Front's forces. 6th Army now contained five rifle divisions, including the rebuilt 160th, two tank corps plus a tank brigade and two tank regiments, one tank destroyer brigade, the 8th Artillery Division and additional artillery assets, and was supported by the entire 2nd Air Army. As the situation evolved during early December, particularly with the commitment of 2nd Guards Army to counter the German attempt to relieve the Stalingrad pocket, Operation Saturn became Operation Little Saturn, but the role of 6th Army remained much the same.

The offensive began on December 16. 6th Army faced four Italian divisions dug in on the west bank of the hard-frozen Don. Shock groups deployed on the Army's left (south) wing and 1st Guards Army's right (north) wing were to attack southward and southeastward into the Italian Army's deep rear with the goal of linking up with 3rd Guards Army behind Army Detachment Hollidt and the remnants of the 3rd Romanian Army. The shock groups of both the 6th and 1st Guards Armies were concentrated on a narrow sector in the Verkhny Mamon region opposite the 3rd Infantry Division Ravenna and 5th Infantry Division Cosseria, reinforced by the German 318th Security Regiment. The shock group of 6th Army (15th Rifle and 17th Tank Corps) did not include the 160th, which would play a supporting role.

Soviet artillery struck the Italian positions before dawn at which time the attack began; however, the artillery was hindered in its spotting by heavy fog along the ice-covered river and in the first 24 hours the Italian forces did a creditable job in limiting the attackers to penetrations of little more than 3 km. 6th Army regrouped its divisions and resumed its offensive the next day with armor thoroughly integrated with the infantry, leading to a complete rout of the Axis forces throughout its main attack sector. The 17th Tank Corps was committed late in the afternoon at the boundary of the 3rd and 5th Italian Divisions and reached 20 km into the Italians' rear area by the end of the day. By the end of December 18 the Soviet armor had broken into the clear, 17th Tanks was halfway to Kantemirovka, and the Italian infantry divisions had simply disintegrated from fear and exhaustion.

6th Army was transferred to Southwestern Front on the morning of December 19. By now it was clear that the Axis forces of Army Group B lacked the resources to halt Little Saturn and began a fighting withdrawal to the west and south, although sizeable groupings were being encircled in several towns and villages. By December 24 the Soviet mobile corps had remarkably exploited as much as 200 km into the Army Group's rear. During the last days of the year the 6th Army protected the Kantemirovka region as planned while 1st Guards Army besieged Axis forces pocketed at and around Gartmashevka Station, Chertkovo and Millerovo.

=== Ostrogozhsk–Rossosh Offensive ===
After regrouping its southern forces in the first days of 1943 the STAVKA was determined to defeat the Axis forces (primarily the 2nd Hungarian Army and remnants of Italian 8th Army) operating along the Voronezh–Kursk and Kharkov axes. The first task was to crush the forces defending the area of Ostrogozhsk and Rossosh, which would primarily involve forces of Voronezh Front. In this offensive the role of 6th Army would be reversed; instead of being an army of Voronezh Front protecting the north flank of Southwestern Front it would be an army of the latter protecting the south flank of the former. It was facing the remnants of the II Italian Army Corps. The 160th was still operating as a separate division in 6th Army, which now had only five rifle divisions and one rifle brigade on strength.

The new offensive began on January 13. The immediate objective of 6th Army was Pokrovskoye. 3rd Tank Army had been transferred to Voronezh Front and took up positions north of 6th Army between Novaya Kalitva and Kantimirovka; it would launch the main attack to envelop the Axis group of forces. That Front had also deployed the 18th Rifle Corps between 3rd Tank and 6th Armies to serve as a shock group. Its 270th Rifle Division was slated to launch a supporting attack on the third day from the area south of Pavlovsk in the general direction of Saprina in order to surround and destroy the Axis grouping along the sector from Belogore to Pasekovo in cooperation with 6th Army's 160th and 127th Rifle Divisions and the 180th Rifle Division of 3rd Tank. During the first day the 160th and 127th were to tie down enemy forces with artillery and small arms fire before going over to the attack on the second day. The two divisions were controlled by the 6th Army's deputy commander.

During January 15 the Axis forces put up strong resistance along 3rd Tank Army's right flank where the 180th Division was attacking. 12th Tank Corps reached the town of Rossosh from the south with its main forces by day's end. With this development the units defending against the 160th and 127th began a disorderly withdrawal to the south and west. An Axis grouping consisting of units of the German 387th Infantry Division and the Italian Ravenna Division was attempting to hold the town of Mitrofanovka which drew the attention of the 180th Division and other elements of 3rd Tanks through the morning of January 16. Once this resistance was broken the remnants of this grouping fell back to the north, trying to reach the positions of the Italian Alpine Corps east of Rossosh. The 160th took up the pursuit along with the 180th Division and the 37th Rifle Brigade and by the end of the day had reached Krinichnaya. On the same day as per STAVKA VGK Directive No. 30017 the 160th and the 62nd Guards (former 127th Division) were transferred to Voronezh Front and came under command of 3rd Tank Army.

The goal of 3rd Tanks' right flank rifle formations on January 17 was to eliminate the Axis forces still resisting southeast of Rossosh. The 62nd Guards and 160th attacked along the right (west) bank of the Don and captured a line from Staraya Kalitva to outside Shevchenko. By the end of the day the Axis grouping (German 387th and 385th Infantry, Italian Ravenna and 4th Alpine Division Cuneense) was reduced to one escape route to the north which was under attack by 18th Rifle Corps. The following day the two Soviet divisions reached Yevstratovskii and continued attacking to the north. The encirclement battle continued on January 19 as the 160th and 62nd Guards, in conjunction with the 180th, fought to destroy the Axis force in the Annovka area. The former two took up the pursuit to the north and by day's end the Axis divisions were reduced to small groups attempting to break out. Following this fighting the 160th and 62nd Guards were dispatched to the Olkhovatka area with the mission of subsequently moving up to the Oskol River to take up jumping-off positions for the Front's new offensive on the Kharkov axis. During this march the 160th continued mopping up refugees from the encirclement, including an attack on January 23 toward Podgornoe with the 62nd Guards and the 219th Rifle Division which effectively ended organized resistance of the encircled force.

=== Operation Star ===
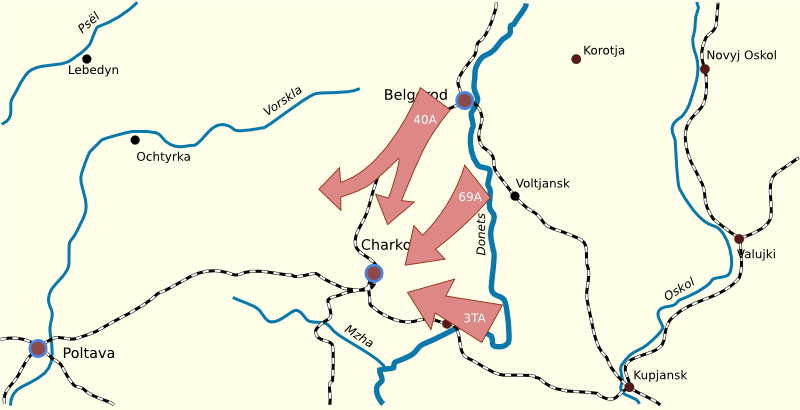
Operation Star

On January 25 the Red Army launched the Voronezh–Kastornoye Offensive, and while this mostly involved the northern forces of Voronezh Front plus Bryansk Front in an effort to encircle and destroy German 2nd Army, the 3rd Tank Army continued advancing to the west. It took a more leading role in Operation Star, which began on February 2 and had the objective of liberating Kharkov and Kursk. Hitler had declared the former a fortress, despite its lack of fortifications and the paucity of troops with which to hold it. The SS Panzer Corps made several efforts to halt the offensive but by February 13 its north flank had been forced back to the outskirts of the city. By the end of February 15 it had evacuated Kharkov and fallen back to the Uda River and 3rd Tank Army took control of the city. On February 18 Colonel Seryugin was wounded and hospitalized. He was replaced in command of the 160th by division deputy commander Col. Aleksei Ivanovich Baksov, but would return to the division on 9 April. As of the beginning of March the 3rd Tank Army had been moved to Southwestern Front.

The German counteroffensive began on February 19 with the 2nd SS Panzergrenadier Division Das Reich striking behind the advance guards of 1st Guards and 6th Armies east of Dnepropetrovsk. Over the following days the remainder of the SS Corps joined the thrust northward. The offensive made significant gains and by February 26 had reached the south flank of Voronezh Front west of Kharkov. Starting on March 1 the 4th Panzer Army covered 80 km in five days despite the onset of the spring thaw; east of Krasnograd it trapped and badly damaged three rifle divisions (including the 160th) and three tank brigades of 3rd Tank Army. The SS Corps retook Kharkov on March 13 after three days of street fighting. The remnants of the division fell back to the east, coming under the command of 69th Army in Voronezh Front. Despite its losses in this counteroffensive the 160th had distinguished itself in the previous breakthrough and exploitation operations under miserable winter conditions so that, on April 18, it was redesignated as the 89th Guards Rifle Division.
