= Pavlo Pokhytaylo =

Ukrainian footballer

Personal information
- Full name: Pavlo Pavlovych Pokhytaylo
- Date of birth: 24 December 1995 (age 30)
- Place of birth: Kolomak, Ukraine
- Height: 1.71 m (5 ft 7 in)
- Position: Left midfielder

Team information
- Current team: Kramatorsk
- Number: 77

Youth career
- 2013: Helios Kharkiv

Senior career*
Years	Team	Apps	(Gls)
2014–2015	Helios-Akademiya Kharkiv (amateurs)	9	(0)
2015	Elektrovazhmash Kharkiv (amateurs)	9	(1)
2016–2017	Orzeł Ząbkowice Śląskie		
2017	Univer-Dynamo KhNUVS Kharkiv (amateurs)	1	(0)
2017–2018	Kakhovka (amateurs)	27	(7)
2018–2019	Yarud Mariupol (amateurs)	14	(0)
2019	Tavriya Novotroitske (amateurs)	1	(0)
2019	Trostianets (amateurs)	0	(0)
2019–2020	Nikopol	16	(0)
2020–2021	Nysa Kłodzko		
2021–	Kramatorsk	16	(2)
- * Club domestic league appearances and goals as of 20 December 2021

Pavlo Pavlovych Pokhytaylo (Ukrainian: Павло Павлович Похитайло; born 24 December 1995) is a Ukrainian professional footballer who plays as a left midfielder for Ukrainian club Kramatorsk.
