= Kolomak Raion =

Former subdivision of Kharkiv Oblast, Ukraine

Kolomak Raion Коломацький район
- Raion
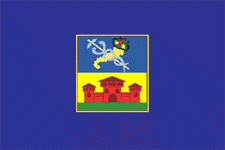
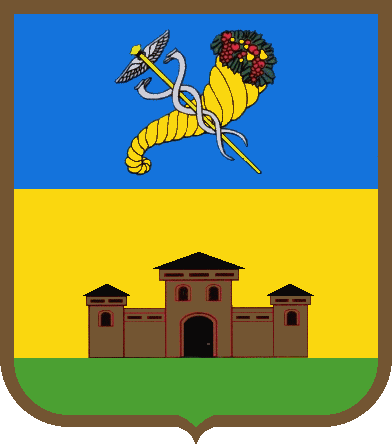
- Flag Coat of arms

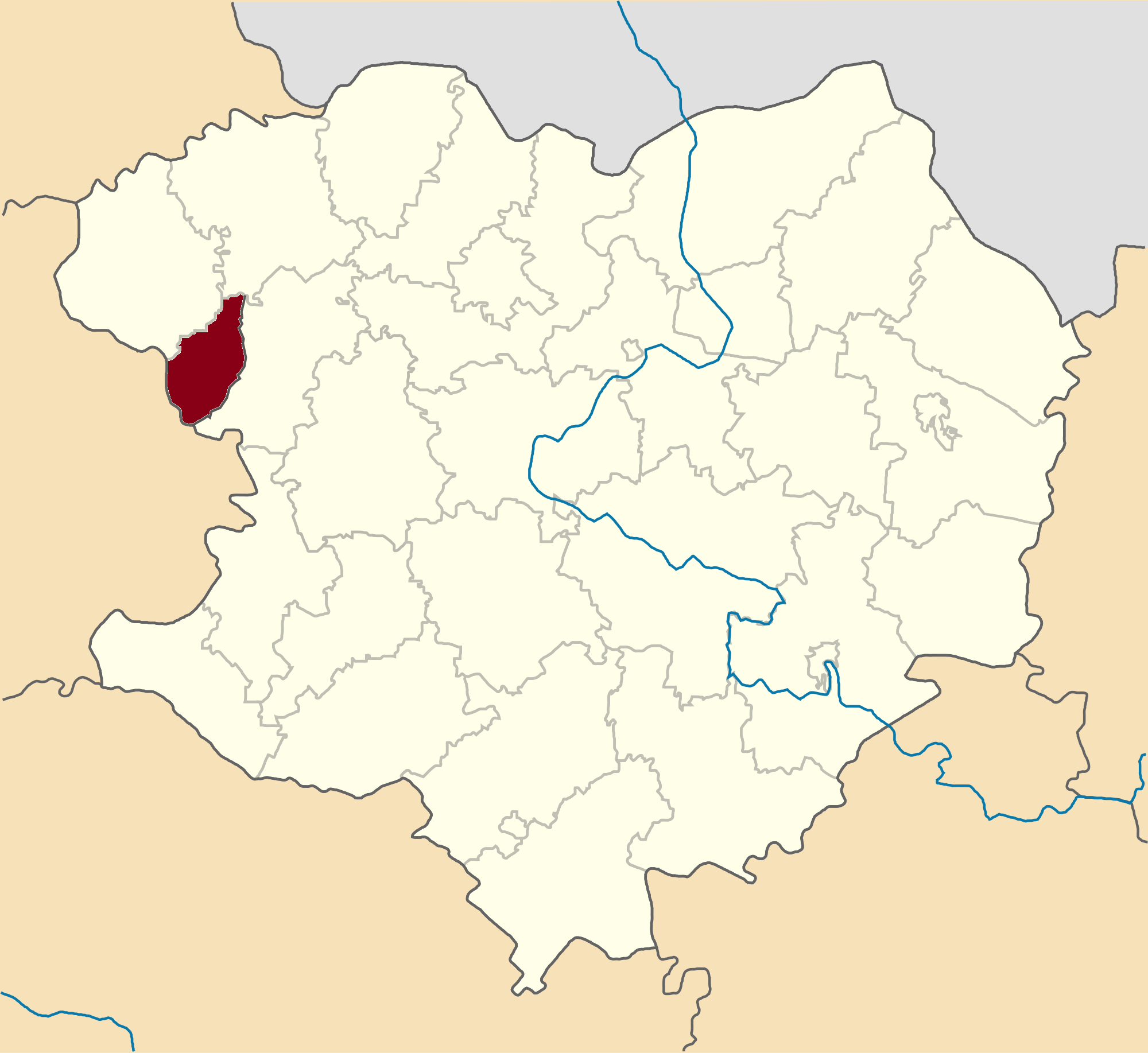
- Raion location in Kharkiv Oblast
- Coordinates: 49°50′13.1778″N 35°17′55.3416″E
- Country: Ukraine
- Oblast: Kharkiv Oblast
- Disestablished: 18 July 2020
- Admin. center: Kolomak

Area
  - Total: 330 km^{2} (130 sq mi)

Population (2020)
  - Total: 6,677
  - Density: 20/km^{2} (52/sq mi)
- Time zone: UTC+2 (EET)
  - Summer (DST): UTC+3 (EEST)
- Website: http://kolomakrda.gov.ua

Kolomak Raion (Ukrainian: Коломацький район) was a raion (district) in Kharkiv Oblast of Ukraine. Its administrative center was the urban-type settlement of Kolomak. The raion was abolished on 18 July 2020 as part of the administrative reform of Ukraine, which reduced the number of raions of Kharkiv Oblast to seven. The area of Kolomak Raion was merged into Bohodukhiv Raion. The last estimate of the raion population was 6,677 (2020 est.)

At the time of disestablishment, the raion consisted of one hromada, Kolomak settlement hromada with the administration in Kolomak.

In Kolomak Ivan Mazepa was elected the Hetman of Left-bank Ukraine in 1687. A monument of him was unveiled in July 2017 in Kolomak.
