= Mikhail Seryugin =

Soviet military commander

Mikhail Petrovich Seryugin
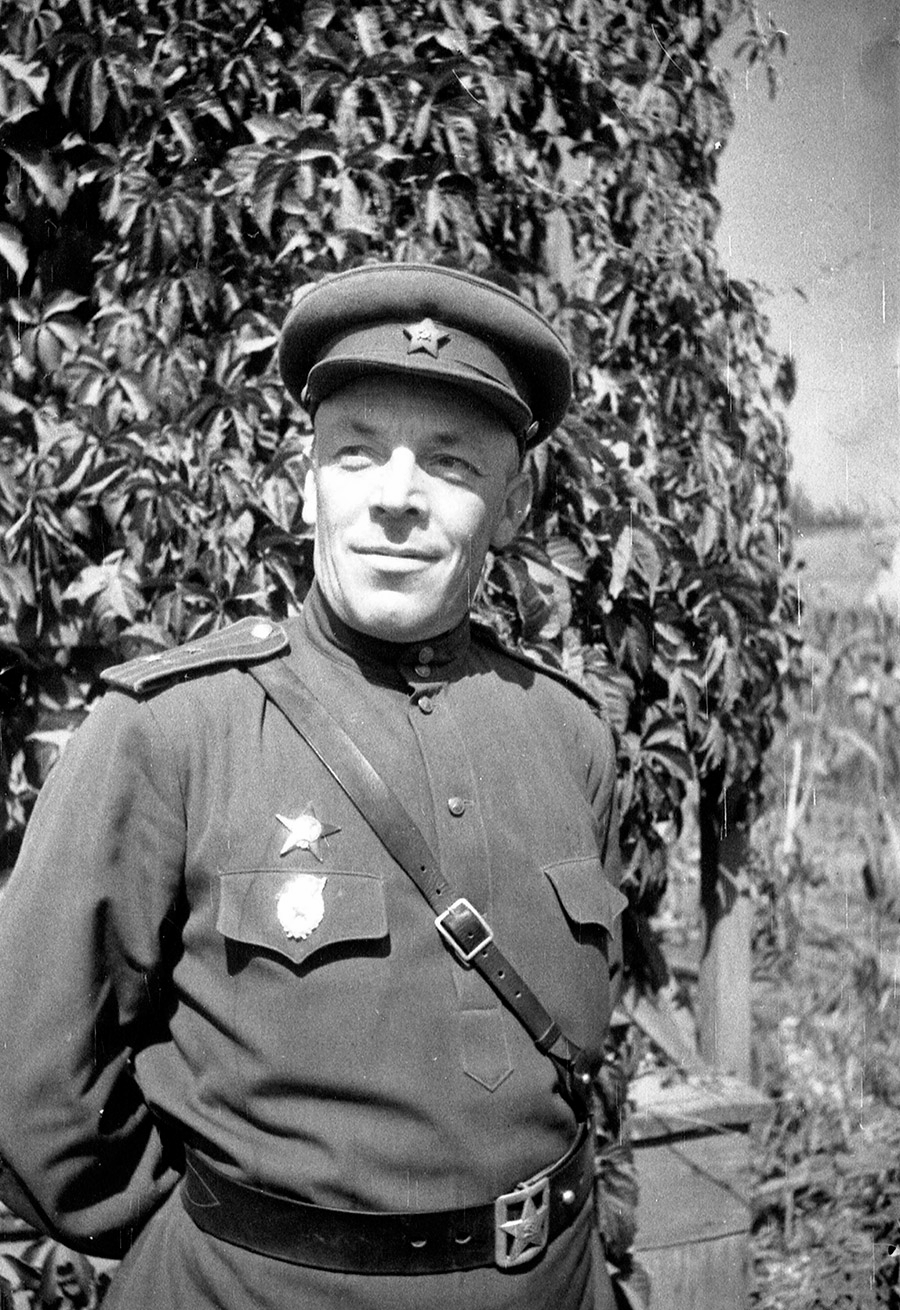
- Seryugin, 1943
- Born: 6 November 1906; Ilyinskoye, Vladimir Governorate, Russian Empire
- Died: 27 March 1975 (aged 68) Rivne, Ukrainian SSR, Soviet Union
- Allegiance: Soviet Union
- Branch: Red Army (later Soviet Army)
- Service years: 1928–1961
- Rank: Lieutenant general
- Commands: 160th Rifle Division (became 89th Guards Rifle Division); 8th Guards Rifle Division; 36th Guards Mechanized Division; 20th Guards Mechanized Division; 29th Guards Rifle Corps; 35th Guards Rifle Corps
- Conflicts: World War II
- Awards: Order of Lenin (2); Order of the Red Banner (2)

Mikhail Petrovich Seryugin (Russian: Михаил Петрович Серюгин; 6 November 1906 – 27 March 1975) was a Soviet Army lieutenant general who held division command during World War II.

Conscripted into the Red Army in the late 1920s, Seryugin became an officer and served in Azerbaijan and Ukraine before World War II. A regimental commander when the war began, he escaped encirclement in the Second Battle of Kharkov while a division chief of staff. Seryugin became commander of the 160th Rifle Division in mid-1942, leading the unit, which became the 89th Guards Rifle Division in early 1943, for the rest of the war. Postwar, he commanded divisions and a corps, rising to deputy commander of an army before his retirement.

== Early life and prewar service ==
Mikhail Petrovich Seryugin was born on 6 November 1906 in the village of Ilyinskoye, Vladimir Governorate. Conscripted into the Red Army in November 1928, he was sent to the school of one-year conscripts of the 5th Caucasian Rifle Regiment of the 2nd Caucasian Rifle Division at Baku, from which he graduated in 1929. Seryugin continued his military service with the regiment and in August 1933 the division was relocated to Ovruch in the Ukrainian Military District. In July 1936 then-Senior Lieutenant Seryugin was transferred to become chief of the regimental school of the 178th Rifle Regiment of the division, which was redesignated as the 60th Rifle Division. From October 1938 he was assistant commander of the 358th Rifle Regiment of the division, and in July 1940 rose to command its 224th Rifle Regiment.

== World War II ==
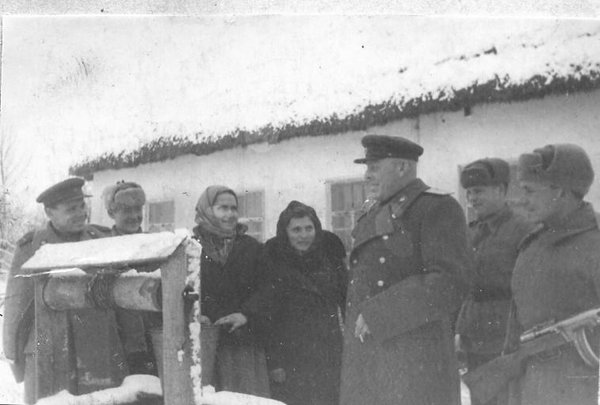
Seryugin talks with residents of a liberated village, 1944

When Operation Barbarossa began on 22 June 1941, then-Major Seryugin commanded the regiment on the Southwestern Front, leading it in the Border Battles west of Stanislav and in the Vinnytsia sector south of Uman. In September he was assigned command of the 124th Rifle Division but did not actually take command due to the 124th being caught in encirclement. Seryugin was instead appointed chief of staff of the 212th Rifle Division, with which he fought in the Donbass Defensive and Barvenkovo–Lozovaya offensive as part of the 6th Army of the Southwestern Front. In May 1942 then-Colonel Seryugin was appointed deputy commander of the division, while continuing to serve as its chief of staff. He fought with it in the Second Battle of Kharkov, during which the division was surrounded. In early June Seryugin broke out of encirclement and crossed over to the eastern bank of the Seversky Donets with the remnants of the 212th.

In July Seryugin was appointed commander of the 160th Rifle Division, which as part of the 6th Army of the Voronezh Front distinguished itself in the Battle of Voronezh. Subsequently, the 160th fought as part of the Voronezh, and from December the Southwestern Fronts, with an active role in Operation Little Saturn. He was wounded on 18 February 1943 while departing for reconnaissance in the area of Height 179.6 and evacuated to a hospital for treatment, being replaced by deputy division commander Colonel Aleksei Baksov. Seryugin resumed command of the division on 9 April, and the 160th was converted to the 89th Guards Rifle Division on 19 April. He led it in the Donbas strategic offensive, the Battle of the Dnieper, the Nikopol–Krivoi Rog offensive, the Bereznegovatoye–Snigirevka offensive, and the Odessa Offensive. Seryugin was promoted to major general on 1 September 1943. Between 2 June and 5 July 1944 Seryugin temporarily commanded the 49th Rifle Corps in the second echelon of the 53rd Army of the 2nd Ukrainian Front during the hospitalization of corps commander Major General Gury Terentyev. After the latter returned, Seryugin resumed command of the 89th Guards, which fought in the Second Jassy–Kishinev offensive as part of the 5th Shock Army. He was evaluated as having "skillfully led divisional units" in the breakthrough of Axis defenses in the Kishinev sector and the repulse of tank counterattacks. Seryugin was described as acting "energetically and competently" despite the presence of Axis tanks in the rear of the division.

In late August the division was withdrawn to the front reserve with the 5th Shock Army. The army and the division were withdrawn to the Reserve of the Supreme High Command on 5 September and in late October joined the 1st Belorussian Front, being relocated to the Magnuszew bridgehead. As part of the shock group of the army, the division played an active role in the Warsaw-Poznan offensive, during which it reached the Oder and captured a bridgehead northwest of Kustrin after breaking through German defenses. Seryugin was evaluated as having "skillfully commanded" the division during these operations and in the Berlin Offensive, during which the division was part of the main shock group that broke through the fortified defenses in the Battle of the Seelow Heights and fought its way into the city during the Battle in Berlin. For his "execution of combat missions, courage, and valor," Seryugin was awarded the Orders of Suvorov and Kutuzov 2nd class.

== Postwar ==
After the end of the war, Seryugin was sent to study at the accelerated course at the Voroshilov Higher Military Academy in June 1945, and upon his graduation in February 1946 was appointed commander of the 8th Guards Rifle Division of the Leningrad Military District. From July of that year he commanded the 36th Guards Mechanized Division. In February 1948 he was sent to the Group of Soviet Occupation Forces in Germany, where he commanded the 20th Guards Mechanized Division and then the 29th Guards Rifle Corps from February 1951. In November of that year, Seryugin was sent to study at the Higher Academic Course at the Voroshilov Academy, and upon graduation in November 1952 he became commander of the 35th Guards Rifle Corps of the Carpathian Military District. He remained in the district as First Deputy Commander-in-Chief of the 13th Army from September 1955 and from August 1958 simultaneously served as a member of the Military Council of the 13th Army. Seryugin retired in April 1961 and died in Rivne on 27 March 1975.

== Awards and decorations ==
Seryugin was a recipient of the following awards and decorations:

USSR

Order of Lenin, twice (22 February 1944, 30 April 1954)
Order of the Red Banner, twice (20 August 1943, 20 June 1949)
Order of Suvorov, 2nd class, twice (27 August 1943, 29 May 1945)
Order of Kutuzov, 2nd class (6 April 1945)
Order of Bogdan Khmelnitsky, 2nd class (13 September 1944)
Order of the Red Star, twice (23 April 1941, 3 November 1944)
Medal "For the Liberation of Warsaw" (1945)
Medal "For the Capture of Berlin" (1945)
Medal "For the Victory over Germany in the Great Patriotic War 1941–1945" (1945)
Jubilee Medal "Twenty Years of Victory in the Great Patriotic War 1941-1945" (1965)
Jubilee Medal "In Commemoration of the 100th Anniversary of the Birth of Vladimir Ilyich Lenin" (1969)
Jubilee Medal "30 Years of the Soviet Army and Navy" (1948)
Jubilee Medal "40 Years of the Armed Forces of the USSR" (1958)
Jubilee Medal "50 Years of the Armed Forces of the USSR" (1968)

Foreign

Order of the Cross of Grunwald, 3rd class (Poland)
Medal "For Oder, Neisse and the Baltic" (Poland)
Medal "For Warsaw 1939-1945" (Poland)
Order of Tudor Vladimirescu, 2nd class (Romania)
Honorary Knight Grand Cross of the Order of the British Empire (United Kingdom)
