= Aleksandr Fyodorovich Vasilev =

Red Army general

- Born: October 1 [O.S. October 13] 1909; Smolensk, Russian Empire
- Died: 9 September 1984 (aged 74); Moscow, Soviet Union
- Military career
- Allegiance: Soviet Union
- Branch: Red Army
- Service years: 1928–1971
- Rank: Major General
- Commands: 305th Rifle Division; 206th Rifle Division
- Conflicts: World War II

Aleksandr Fyodorovich Vasilev (Russian: Александр Федорович Васильев; October 1 [O.S. October 13] 1909 – 9 September 1984, Moscow) was a major general of the Red Army during the Second World War.

== Biography ==
Vasilev joined the Red Army in 1928, when he was 19 years of age. During the Second World War he did not reach the fighting front until May 8, 1942, when he was appointed as chief of staff of the 75th Fortified Region in Voronezh Front. On July 26 this unit was converted to the second formation of the 305th Rifle Division, where he first served as deputy commander until May 2, 1943, when he replaced Col. Ivan Antinovich Danilovich as division commander. Concurrently with this, Vasilev was promoted to the rank of colonel. At this time the division was in the newly-formed 69th Army in preparation for the Battle of Kursk. Vasilev would remain in command of the 305th for the duration of the war with Germany.

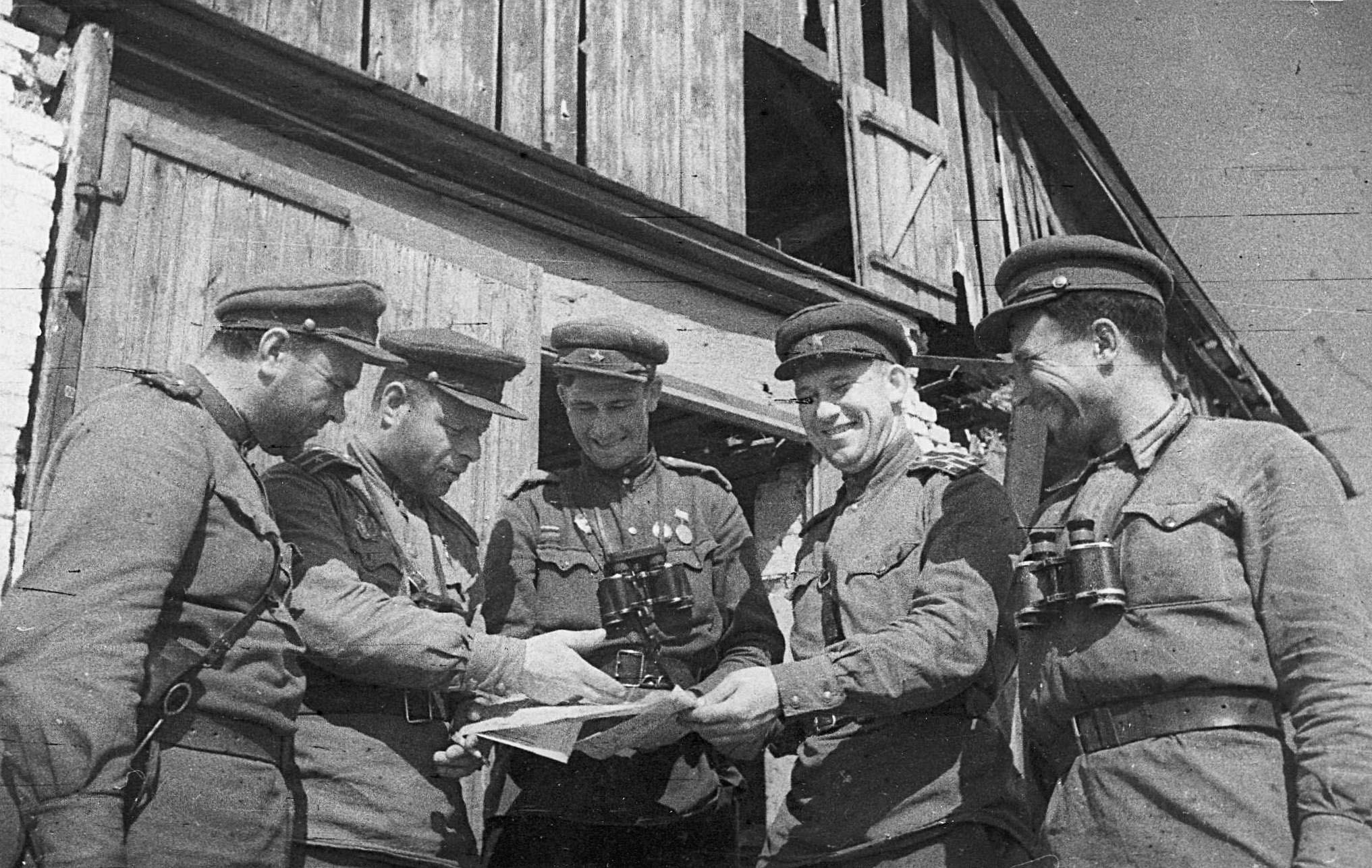
Col. A. F. Vasilev (center) shares apparent good news with subordinates at his forward outpost in Shliakhovoe, during the Battle of Kursk.

During the battle the division was ordered forward on the evening of July 8 to help counter the German III Panzer Corps, which was threatening to break through the Soviet front between 6th Guards and 7th Guards Armies east of Belgorod. At the time, Colonel Sereda of the political department of 69th Army noted as follows:

"I want to note that the division headquarters is not working as a team, is not operating smoothly, and lacks the necessary guidance. Vasilev is an old partisan, and in the old way is hauling around a wench [a frontline girlfriend]."

After the German offensive was halted the Red Army began its counter-offensive, Operation Rumyantsev, on August 3. Two days later the 305th distinguished itself in being the first unit to break into the western outskirts of Belgorod, mopping up the city over the next 24 hours with the assistance of the 89th Guards Rifle Division attacking from the east. For this accomplishment the division was awarded the honorific "Belgorod". In 1963, Vasilev was awarded the title "Honorary citizen of Belgorod" by a resolution of the city's Council of People's Deputies.

Following a few other assignments, Vasilev's division was moved to the 38th Army in December 1943, where it remained for the duration. This Army was eventually moved to the 4th Ukrainian Front, fighting through Slovakia in 1945 and ending the war near Prague. On July 11, Vasilev was promoted to the rank of major general, but in August the 305th was disbanded, and he was placed at disposal of the Main Personnel Directorate until November, when he was given command of the 206th Rifle Division.

This state of affairs lasted just one month, when Vasilev was arrested for investigation. On February 21, 1946, he was dismissed from the Red Army. On October 2, 1952, he was stripped of his rank as major general. In August 1953, following the death of Stalin, he was rehabilitated, and reinstated in the Army with his former rank. Vasilev went on to study at the Military Academy of the General Staff, before going on to serve as a Senior Instructor, Military Department, Agricultural Academy from 1955 to 1959, and then as the Head of the Military Department, Moscow Economic-Statistical Institute, where he remained until his retirement on June 2, 1971.
