= 35th Guards Rifle Corps =

- Active: April 1943 – September 1956
- Country: Soviet Union
- Branch: Red Army (Soviet Army from 1946)
- Type: Rifle corps
- Engagements: World War II
- Honorifics: Prut

The 35th Guards Rifle Corps (Russian: 35-й гвардейский стрелковый корпус) was a rifle corps of the Red Army during World War II that became part of the Soviet Army during the Cold War.

== World War II ==
=== Formation ===
The 35th Guards Rifle Corps was formed in accordance with a Stavka directive of 18 April 1943 by the conversion of the 7th Rifle Corps (Second formation) of the 64th Army (which itself soon became the 7th Guards Army) into a Guards unit in recognition of its actions in the Battle of Stalingrad. Corps troops included the 52nd Separate Communications and 8th Separate Sapper Battalions, which became the 138th and 105th Separate Guards, respectively, on 4 May. Its 12th, 13th, and 14th Guards, and 92nd, 96th, and 149th Rifle Brigades were simultaneously combined to form the 92nd, 93rd, and 94th Guards Rifle Divisions, with each division being formed from two brigades. The commander of the 7th Rifle Corps, Lieutenant General Sergey Goryachev, continued in command of the 35th Guards.

The process of forming the new divisions began on 24 April, with the 92nd Guards formed from the 12th Guards and 149th Rifle Brigades, the 93rd Guards from the 13th Guards and 92nd Rifle Brigades, and the 94th Guards from the 14th Guards and 96th Rifle Brigades, and was completed by 30 April. At this time, due to the arrival of replacements, the three divisions of the corps had between roughly 8,400 and 9,300 men each, and were at approximately 77 to 87 percent of their authorized strength.

=== Kursk to Prague ===
With the 7th Guards Army, the corps served with the Voronezh Front and then the Steppe Front from July 1943, fighting in the Battle of Kursk and the Belgorod–Kharkov Offensive. Developing the offensive, the corps reached the Dnieper in late September, assault-crossing the river and capturing a bridgehead on the right bank. Subsequently, with the 7th Guards and then the 27th Armies of the 2nd and 3rd Ukrainian Fronts, the corps fought in the Kirovograd, Uman–Botoșani, Jassy–Kishinev, Debrecen, Budapest, Vienna, and Prague Offensives, capturing Kirovograd, Tulchyn, Ploiești, Cluj, Szolnok, Eger, Zalaegerszeg, and Bratislava. For its actions in the Uman–Botoșani Offensive the corps received the Prut honorific on 24 April 1944.

== Postwar ==
The corps was stationed in western Romania with the 27th Army as part of the Southern Group of Forces from July to November, when it included the 66th, 108th, and 125th Guards Rifle Divisions. Around this time it was withdrawn to the Carpathian Military District, becoming part of the 38th Army. The corps and the 66th Guards were headquartered at Chernovitsi, while the 125th Guards were at Tulchyn and the 202nd Rifle Division (converted into the 25th Mechanized Division) at Khotyn. Goryachev commanded the corps until June 1948. By 1950 it instead included the 66th and 70th Guards Rifle Divisions. The corps was disbanded on 28 September 1956 when the number of Soviet Army corps headquarters was reduced due to a smaller number of divisions.

== Commanders ==
The following officers commanded the corps:

- Lieutenant General Sergey Goryachev (18 April 1943–June 1948)
- Major General Grigory Revunenkov (June 1948–March 1951; promoted to lieutenant general 11 May 1949)
- Major General Mikhail Seryugin (March 1951–2 September 1955; promoted to lieutenant general 3 August 1953)
- Major General Vladimir Filippov (3 September 1955–28 September 1956)
