= Kolomak =

Rural locality in Kharkiv Oblast, Ukraine

Kolomak Коломак
- Rural settlement
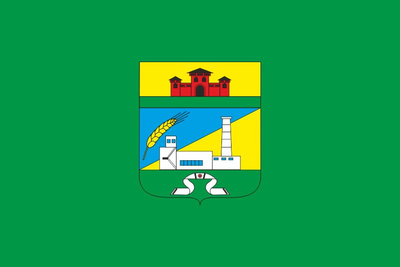
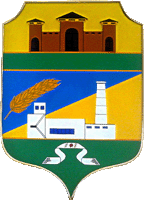
- Flag Coat of arms

- Location within Ukraine Location within Kharkiv Oblast
- Coordinates: 49°50′31″N 35°18′29″E
- Country: Ukraine
- Oblast: Kharkiv Oblast
- Raion: Bohodukhiv Raion
- Hromada: Kolomak settlement hromada

Population (2022)
  - Total: 2,619
- Time zone: UTC+2 (EET)
  - Summer (DST): UTC+3 (EEST)

Kolomak (Ukrainian: Коломак; Russian: Коломак) is a rural settlement in Bohodukhiv Raion, Kharkiv Oblast, Ukraine. It hosts the administration of Kolomak settlement hromada, one of the hromadas of Ukraine. Population: 2,619 (2022 estimate).

Kolomak is located between Poltava and Kharkiv, on both banks of the Kolomak River, a major left tributary of the Vorskla in the drainage basin of the Dnieper. Kolomak is an old Cossack town of the Sloboda Ukraine where Hetman Ivan Mazepa signed a treaty with Russia.

== History ==
The village of Kolomak was established during the second half of 17th century on the site of a preexistent fortified settlement from the 16th century. It was a village in Valky uyezd of Kharkov Governorate of the Russian Empire.

During World War II it was under German occupation from October 1941 to September 1943. In January 1989 the population was 4628 people. In January 2013 the population was 3844 people.

Until 18 July 2020, Kolomak was the administrative center of Kolomak Raion. The raion was abolished in July 2020 as part of the administrative reform of Ukraine, which reduced the number of raions of Kharkiv Oblast to seven. The area of Kolomak Raion was merged into Bohodukhiv Raion.

Until 26 January 2024, Kolomak was designated urban-type settlement. On this day, a new law entered into force which abolished this status, and Kolomak became a rural settlement.

== Economy ==
=== Transportation ===
The Highway M03, connecting Kyiv and Kharkiv via Poltava, runs about 10 kilometres (6.2 mi) south of Kolonak, and the settlement has an easy access to it. There are local roads as well.

Kolomak railway station, on the Southern railway line connecting Kharkiv and Poltava, is not located in Kolomak but in Shelestove, about 5 kilometres (3.1 mi) west of the settlement. There is a freight dead-end railway line to Kolomak from Vodiana railway station, on the same line connecting Kharkiv and Poltava.

== People from Kolomak ==
- Pavlo Pokhytaylo (born 1995), Ukrainian footballer
