= Aleksei Baksov =

Soviet Army colonel general

Aleksei Ivanovich Baksov
- Baksov, c. 1943
- Born: 18 March 1907; Bolshaya Kamyshinka, Saratov Governorate, Russian Empire
- Died: 26 November 1986 (aged 79); Moscow, Soviet Union
- Military career
- Allegiance: Soviet Union
- Branch: Red Army (later Soviet Army)
- Service years: 1926–1972
- Rank: Colonel general
- Commands: 160th Rifle Division; 67th Guards Rifle Division; 2nd Guards Rifle Corps
- Conflicts: World War II
- Awards: Hero of the Soviet Union; Order of Lenin (2); Order of the Red Banner (6)

Aleksei Ivanovich Baksov (Russian: Алексей Иванович Баксов; 18 March 1907 – 26 November 1986) was a Soviet Army colonel general and a Hero of the Soviet Union.

== Early life and prewar service ==
Aleksei Ivanovich Baksov was born on 18 March 1907 in the village of Bolshaya Kamyshinka, Saratov Governorate. From 1922 to 1925, he worked as a lumberjack at the 2nd State Plant in Saratov Oblast and then as a recorder at the registrar's office in Tashkent. Conscripted into the Red Army in September 1926, Baksov was sent to study at the Lenin Combined Central Asian Military School in Tashkent. Upon his graduation in September 1929, he served as assistant chief and chief of line border outposts of the Osh Separate Border Komendatura of the 58th Border Detachment of the NKVD Troops. From December 1932 he was chief of the line border outpost and assistant commandant of the 2nd sector of the 68th Border Detachment of the NKVD Troops. Baksov was sent to study at the Budyonny Red Banner Cavalry Officers Improvement Course (KUKS) from November 1934 to June 1935, then appointed senior course commander at the 2nd NKVD Border School in Kharkov. From May 1936 he studied at the Frunze Military Academy and after graduation in May 1939 was appointed deputy chief of the Main Directorate of NKVD Forces for the Protection of Important Industrial Enterprises.

== World War II ==
After Operation Barbarossa began, then-Colonel Baksov was appointed chief of the operations department of the local air defense directorate of the NKVD in Moscow in September 1941. From June 1942 he was deputy commander of the 160th Rifle Division of the 40th Army of the Bryansk Front, which he fought with in the Battle of Voronezh, during which the division conducted a fighting retreat to Stary Oskol and then to the line of the Don. From June to July Baksov was encircled with the division, but managed to reach Soviet lines with a group of soldiers, retaining their uniforms and documents. From 9 July the division transferred to the 6th Army of the Voronezh Front for rebuilding. From 6 August its units defended the eastern bank of the Don on the line from Pokrovsky to Petropavlovskoye, holding a bridgehead on the western bank of the river. On 29 November the division handed over its sector and by mid-December was concentrated in the area of Verkhny and Nizhny Gnilushy. From 22 December the division fought in Operation Little Saturn. From 17 to 20 January 1943 the division fought in the Ostrogozhsk–Rossosh offensive, then was transferred to the 3rd Tank Army of the Southwestern Front and continued the offensive. When division commander Colonel Mikhail Seryugin was wounded on 18 February, Baksov took over command of the 160th. He led it in the Third Battle of Kharkov, during which the division captured Kovyagi on 26 February. The 160th joined the 69th Army of the Voronezh Front between 4 March and 10 April. Despite the general Soviet retreat during the battle, Baksov was singled out for praise for an action on 6 March in which he "calmly and confidently accepted battle, resulting in the destruction of up to 80 enemy tanks and over 3,000 soldiers and officers. Temporarily retreating, the division confidently defended against the enemy, while preserving its personnel and weapons." For his "skillful leadership of the division and completion of assigned combat missions," Baksov was awarded the Order of the Red Banner. Seryugin returned from the hospital on 9 April and Baksov resumed his duties as deputy division commander. On 10 April the division was transferred to the 21st Army, redesignated the 6th Guards Army on 16 April, and defended the line of Krivtsovo, Igumenka, Sheino, and Ushakovo. It was converted to the 89th Guards Rifle Division on 18 April in recognition of its actions. From 11 May the division occupied a line of defense in the second echelon of the 6th Guards Army.

In June Baksov was transferred to command the 67th Guards Rifle Division. He led it in the Battle of Kursk and the Belgorod–Kharkov offensive operation as part of the 6th Guards Army. In late September the division was withdrawn to the Reserve of the Supreme High Command with the 6th Guards Army and relocated to the vicinity of Gorodok, Kalinin Oblast. From January 1944 the division, part of the 2nd Baltic Front fought in fierce fighting in the Idritsa sector, and in the Vitebsk–Orsha offensive and the Polotsk offensive during the summer. For distinguishing itself in the capture of Vitebsk, the division was awarded the name of the city as an honorific on 10 July and the Order of the Red Banner on 23 July. Baksov was made a Hero of the Soviet Union for his leadership of the 67th Guards on 22 July.

Baksov assumed command of the 2nd Guards Rifle Corps of the 6th Guards Army of the 1st Baltic Front on 21 August, leading it in the Memel Offensive. Shortly before the offensive began, German forces launched a counterattack against the army whose main attack fell in the sector of the corps. The counterattack failed to break through the defenses of the corps and in the October offensive battles the corps broke through strong German fortifications in the area of Kuršėnai. Developing the offensive, the corps advanced more than 100 km in a few days, then as part of the 2nd Baltic and then the Leningrad Front from April 1945 fought in the blockade of the Courland Pocket until the end of the war.

== Postwar ==
After the end of the war, Baksov continued to command the corps. From August 1946 he studied at the Voroshilov Higher Military Academy, and upon his graduation in February 1948 was at the disposal of the Foreign Relations Directorate of the General Staff. After being sent on a government mission abroad, Baksov returned to the Soviet Union and in December 1950 became chief of staff of the Moscow Air Defense Region, which became the Central Air Defense District in June 1954. From September 1954 Baksov was chief of staff, and from April 1955 first deputy commander and member of the Military Council of the Moscow Air Defense District. He was placed at the disposal of the Commander-in-Chief of the Ground Forces in August 1962, and in November of that year became senior representative (from September 1963 representative of the Commander-in-Chief of the Joint Armed Forces) of the Warsaw Pact to the Bulgarian People's Army. Baksov retired in February 1972 and died in Moscow on 26 November 1986.

== Awards and decorations ==
Baksov was a recipient of the following awards and decorations:

- Hero of the Soviet Union
- Order of Lenin (2)
- Order of the Red Banner (6)
- Order of Suvorov, 2nd class
- Order of Kutuzov, 2nd class
- Order of the Patriotic War, 1st class
- Order of the Red Star
- Medals
