= 305th Rifle Division =

305th Rifle Division (July 2, 1941 – July 7, 1942) 305th Rifle Division (October 26, 1942 – 1945)
- Col. I. A. Danilovich after promotion to Major General
- Active: 1941–1945
- Country: Soviet Union
- Branch: Red Army
- Type: Infantry
- Size: Division
- Engagements: Siege of Leningrad; Lyuban Offensive Operation; Operation Blue; Battle of Kursk; Belgorod-Khar'kov Offensive Operation; Zhitomir–Berdichev Offensive; Lvov–Sandomierz Offensive; Vistula–Oder Offensive; Prague Offensive
- Decorations: Order of the Red Banner 2nd Formation Order of Suvorov 2nd Formation Order of Kutuzov 2nd Formation
- Battle honours: Belgorod (2nd Formation)

Commanders
- Notable commanders: Col. Dmitrii Ivanovich Barabanshchikov; Col. Ivan Antonovich Danilovich; Col. Aleksandr Fyodorovich Vasilev

The 305th Rifle Division was formed for the first time as a standard Red Army rifle division shortly after the German invasion. It was soon sent north to the Volkhov Front near Novgorod. In the winter of 1942 it participated in an offensive to try to break the siege of Leningrad which ended with it and most of the rest of the attacking force being cut off and gradually annihilated during the spring. A second 305th was raised a few months later in the southern part of the front, where it distinguished itself in the final liberation of Belgorod. It continued in combat through Ukraine and Poland before ending the war near Prague.

== 1st Formation ==
The 305th Rifle Division began forming on July 2, 1941 at Dmitrov in the Moscow Military District. Its order of battle was as follows:

- 1000th Rifle Regiment
- 1002nd Rifle Regiment
- 1004th Rifle Regiment
- 830th Artillery Regiment
- 358th Antitank Battalion – added in 1942
- 573rd Sapper Battalion
- 726th Signal Battalion
- 377th Reconnaissance Company

Col. Dmitrii Ivanovich Barabanshchikov was appointed to command of the division the day it started forming, and he would remain in this position until nearly the end of this formation's existence. After several weeks forming up as was typical for the divisions being formed from reservists in this period, the 305th was shipped north in early August to the area around Novgorod, where it came under command of the Northwestern Front's Novgorod Operations Group, joining the remnants of the 16th Rifle Corps' 237th Rifle Division and 1st Mountain Rifle Brigade. By October 1 the Group consisted of the 305th, the 180th and 185th Rifle Divisions, plus the 3rd Tank Division, which had no tanks and was converting to infantry. The Group was defending a 30km sector along the Volkhov River from Dubrovka to Lake Ilmen.

On November 12 the division was ordered into an attack, along with the 180th, in support of 52nd Army's attempt to cut off the German forces that were withdrawing from Tikhvin. This attack against the scattered positions of the Spanish Blue Division in the Malaya Vishera area made few gains but did hold that division in place. In December the 305th was reassigned to 52nd Army in Volkhov Front. It took part in the Lyuban Offensive Operation during the winter months of 1942, entering the penetration of the German front across the Volkhov that was created by 2nd Shock Army in an attempt to drive into the rear of the German forces laying siege to Leningrad. While significant gains were made, the operation depended on maintaining two narrow supply corridors, which forces of German 18th Army succeeded in cutting between March 18 – 20. The 305th Rifle was now trapped in the half-frozen swamps south of Lyuban, and while it made valiant efforts to restore the situation over the coming months, by June 1 it was reporting to 2nd Shock Army that its strength was down to 860 officers, 753 NCOs and 3,208 men. On June 8 Colonel Barabanshchikov was replaced by Col. Aleksandr Pavlovich Tarasov. The division was finally destroyed in late June as the Germans "mopped up" the pocket, and it was officially disbanded on July 7.

== 2nd Formation ==
Col. A. F. Vasilev (center) shares apparent good news with subordinates at his forward outpost in Shliakhovoe, during the Battle of Kursk.

The second 305th Rifle Division was formed from the 75th Fortified Region on October 26, 1942 in 60th Army in the Voronezh Front. Its order of battle remained as previous. Col. Aleksandr Petrovich Krutikhin was appointed as commander when the division was reformed, and would remain in command until January 2, 1943, when he was replaced by Col. Ivan Antinovich Danilovich. The division remained in that Army for the remainder of the year, then moved to Front reserves, then to 40th Army, and in February 1943 to the newly-formed 69th Army. Colonel Danilovich was in turn replaced on May 2 by Col. Aleksandr Fyodorovich Vasilev, who would continue in command for the duration of the war.

In the planning for the Soviet defense against the expected German offensive around the Kursk salient, the commander of Voronezh Front, Army Gen. N. F. Vatutin, placed his 69th Army, of five rifle divisions, in the second echelon to guard the juncture of his 6th and 7th Guards Armies in the first echelon. The 305th was assigned to the new 48th Rifle Corps, along with the 107th and 183rd Rifle Divisions, just one day before the Battle of Kursk began. At this time the division had a total strength of 7,778 men, 334 light and heavy machine guns, 219 anti-tank rifles, 157 mortars (from 50mm to 120mm calibre), and 80 guns (45mm to 122mm calibre).

As elements of the German III Panzer Corps pushed through towards Melikhovo on July 8, General Vatutin ordered the division forward at around 1100 hrs. to help plug the gaps that were opening in the first echelon. Due to slow communications Colonel Vasilev did not receive the order until 1620 hrs., and the full division was not on the road until 1930. In addition, since 69th Army was not on high priority for replacements, the division was short about 70% of its required horse transport, and each infantryman was required to carry one artillery shell in addition to his regular equipment. Despite these and other difficulties (one battalion commander plus two of his senior subordinates got drunk and lost all control of their unit), by dawn on July 9 most of the 1004th Rifle Regiment had arrived to reinforce the defense of the village of Shliakhovoe along with battalions from the 280th Guards Rifle Regiment of 92nd Guards Rifle Division, which had fallen back from Melikhovo. The 1002nd Regiment, with the 2nd battalion of the 830th Artillery, deployed on unfortified ground to back up the rest of the 92nd Guards, while the 1000th took up positions to the east which were not in direct contact with the enemy.

In late July, after the German forces had abandoned their offensive at Kursk, 69th Army, including the 305th, was transferred to Steppe Front. On August 3, Voronezh and Steppe Fronts launched the Belgorod-Bogodukhov Offensive Operation, and on August 5 the division distinguished itself in the final liberation of Belgorod, being the first Red Army unit to break into its western outskirts, while the 89th Guards Rifle Division was simultaneously breaking into the east; between them they mopped up the German remnants within 24 hours. For this it received the name of that city as an honorific:

"BELGOROD – ...305th Rifle Division (Col. Vasilev, Aleksandr Fyodorovich)... The troops that participated in the liberation of Belgorod, by order of the Supreme Commander-in-Chief of August 5, 1943 and a proclamation of gratitude in Moscow, are given a salute of 12 artillery salvoes of 120 guns."

In 1963, then-Major General Vasilev was awarded the title "Honorary citizen of Belgorod" by the city's Council of People's Deputies.

In September, the 69th Army was removed to the Reserve of the Supreme High Command, and while in reserves the 305th was assigned to 74th Rifle Corps of 1st Guards Army. This army was moved to 1st Ukrainian Front in November, but in December the entire 74th Rifle Corps was shifted to 38th Army. The division remained in that Army for the duration. On March 23, 1944, the 305th was one of five rifle divisions given credit for the liberation of Vinnytsia, and was awarded the Order of the Red Banner. In May the division left 74th Corps to be reassigned at various times to each of the other rifle corps in 38th Army. In November 1944, the 38th Army was transferred to 4th Ukrainian Front. On February 19, 1945, the 305th was recognized for it role in the liberation of Wadowice and other nearby towns with the Order of Suvorov, 2nd Class. The division ended hostilities in the vicinity of Prague. At this time, the men and women of the division proudly boasted the distinguished title of 305th Rifle, Belgorod, Order of the Red Banner, Order of Suvorov, Order of Kutuzov Division. (Russian: 305-я стрелковая Белгородская Краснознамённая орденов Суворова и Кутузова дивизия.)

The division was disbanded "in place" during the summer of 1945 with the Northern Group of Forces.
