= 43rd Tank Division (Soviet Union) =

- 43-я танковая дивизия
- Active: March 1941 - August 1941
- Country: Soviet Union
- Allegiance: Red Army
- Branch: Army
- Type: Heavy-Mechanized
- Part of: 19th Mechanized Corps
- Garrison/HQ: Kiev Military District, Berdichev
- Engagements: World War II

The 43rd Tank Division (Russian: 43-я танковая дивизия) was a Soviet armored division during World War II.

== History ==
Formed in March 1941 in the Kiev Military District as part of the 19th Motorized Rifle Division. The division was formed on the basis of the 35th Light Tank Red Banner Brigade (recently redeployed from the Leningrad Military District). The regiment was stationed in Berdichev.

On June 19-20, by order of the Kiev Military District command, units of the 19th Motorized Rifle Corps were withdrawn from their deployment areas and concentrated in reserve areas. During the course of June 20, food and ammunition depots were removed. Only headquarters and duty units remained in winter quarters.

On August 9, the remnants of the corps' divisions were transferred to the 31st Rifle Corps. The corps and division headquarters were placed under the command of the Southwestern Front headquarters.

== Organization ==
These regiments are a part of the 43rd Tank Division.

- 85th Armored Regiment
- 86th Armored Regiment
- 43rd Motorized Infantry Regiment
- 43rd Howitzer Regiment
- 43rd separate anti-aircraft artillery division
- 43rd Pontoon Battalion
- 43rd Medical Battalion
- 43rd Separate Comms Battalion

== Equipment ==
By June 22, 1941, it had 237 tanks (5 KV-1 , 2 T-34 , 230 T-26).
