= Ivan Buslayev =

Soviet Army major general

Ivan Yefimovich Buslayev
- Buslayev, c. 1944–1945
- Born: 26 December 1903; Vsevolodchino, Volsky Uyezd, Saratov Governorate, Russian Empire
- Died: 30 May 1967 (aged 63) Belaya Tserkov, Ukrainian SSR, Soviet Union
- Allegiance: Soviet Union
- Branch: Red Army (later Soviet Army)
- Service years: 1925–1956
- Rank: Major general
- Commands: 213th Rifle Division; 10th Machine Gun Artillery Division
- Conflicts: Spanish Civil War; World War II
- Awards: Order of Lenin (3); Order of the Red Banner (4); Order of Suvorov, 2nd class; Order of Kutuzov, 2nd class; Order of the Patriotic War, 1st class; Order of the Red Star

Ivan Yefimovich Buslayev (Russian: Иван Ефимович Буслаев; 26 December 1903 – 30 May 1967) was a Soviet Army major general and a Hero of the Soviet Union.

Buslayev began his service as an ordinary soldier in the mid-1920s, rising to non-commissioned officer and then to junior officer. After serving in the Spanish Civil War, he rose to battalion and regimental command. When Operation Barbarossa began, Buslayev was commanding a regiment in Belarus. After leading the regiment in the Battle of Smolensk and operations to break the Siege of Leningrad, he commanded an anti-tank brigade on the Voronezh Front and from mid-1943 commanded the 213th Rifle Division. Buslayev led the division for the rest of the war and was made a Hero of the Soviet Union for his leadership of it in the Battle of the Dnieper.

== Early life and prewar service ==
Ivan Yefimovich Buslayev was born on 26 December 1903 to a peasant family in the village of Vsevolodchino, Saratov Governorate, and graduated from a seven-grade incomplete secondary school. Conscripted into the Red Army in November 1925, he was sent to serve as a Red Army man with the 11th Rifle Regiment of the 4th Rifle Division at Slutsk, Belarus, with which he spent most of the prewar years. Having graduated from the regimental school, Buslayev rose to squad leader, assistant platoon commander and starshina. He completed the accelerated course for commanders at Bobruisk in 1929 and served as a commander of a rifle platoon and training platoon before commanding a machine gun company. Buslayev was sent to fight in the Spanish Civil War between 10 March 1937 and 1 April 1938 and was wounded.

After his return to the Soviet Union, Buslayev was appointed battalion commander in the 150th Rifle Regiment of the 50th Rifle Division at Polotsk. From November 1938 he was assistant commander for personnel of the 148th Rifle Regiment of the division, and in early December was appointed chief of the division Course for Junior Lieutenants of the Infantry. In May 1939 he became commander of the 49th Rifle Regiment of the division, with which he participated in the Soviet invasion of Poland. Buslayev was appointed acting chief of the combat training department of the 3rd Army at Riga in May 1940, but soon returned to Belarus in July to command the 603rd Rifle Regiment of the 161st Rifle Division at Chausy. In the same year he also completed the Vystrel course, which provided advanced training for regimental commanders.

== World War II ==
After Operation Barbarossa began, Buslayev commanded the regiment in fighting on the Minsk-Moscow highway. In early September the 161st fought in the Yelnya Offensive, then in the First Sinyavino Offensive. During the latter, the division became the 4th Guards Rifle Division. In late October the regiment and the 4th Guards were relocated to the Tikhvin sector to participate in the fighting there, known as the Tikhvin Defensive and Offensive Operations. In February Buslayev was hospitalized due to illness.

Placed at the disposal of the Main Personnel Directorate in February 1942, Buslayev was appointed deputy commander of the 7th Rifle Division, forming in the Ural Military District. On 4 May he was relieved of this position and appointed commander of the 6th Destroyer Brigade, equipped with anti-tank guns, in the district. Later that month, the brigade joined the 1st Destroyer Division, forming in the Moscow Military District. In July the division was sent to the Voronezh Front, fighting in the Battle of Voronezh as part of the 6th Army. In the advance of the front on Belgorod, the brigade participated in the recapture of Novy Oskol on 28 January 1943, and then the recapture of Kharkov in Operation Star on 16 February before fighting in the Third Battle of Kharkov in March. For his leadership of the brigade, Buslayev was awarded the Order of the Patriotic War, 1st class, on 22 June.

On the same day, Buslayev took command of the 213th Rifle Division, leading it in the Battle of Kursk from 5 July 1943, the Belgorod–Kharkov Offensive, and the offensive towards Krasnograd. During the Battle of the Dnieper, the 213th participated in the consolidation and expansion of a bridgehead on the right bank of the Dnieper. For his "courage and heroism" in these operations, Buslayev was awarded the title Hero of the Soviet Union and the Order of Lenin on 26 October 1943, a day after being promoted to major general. During the rest of the war, he led the division in the Kirovograd Offensive, the Korsun-Shevchenkovsky Offensive, the Uman–Botoșani Offensive, the Second Jassy–Kishinev Offensive, the Vistula–Oder Offensive, the Sandomierz–Silesian Offensive, the Lower Silesian Offensive, the Berlin Offensive, and the Prague Offensive.

== Postwar ==
After the end of the war, Buslayev continued to command the 213th in the Lvov Military District. He graduated from the Higher Military Academy in 1948, and in May was appointed commander of the 10th Machine Gun Artillery Division of the Primorsky Military District. Buslayev was transferred to the Kiev Military District in January 1951 to serve as deputy commander of the 20th Guards Rifle Corps, and was transferred to the reserve in July 1956. He lived in Belaya Tserkov, where he died on 30 May 1967.

== Awards and honors ==
Buslayev was a recipient of the following decorations:

- Order of Lenin (3)
- Order of the Red Banner (4)
- Order of Suvorov, 2nd class
- Order of Kutuzov, 2nd class
- Order of the Patriotic War, 1st class
- Order of the Red Star
- Medals
