= 140th Rifle Division =

140th Rifle Division (August 16, 1939 – September 19, 1941) 140th Rifle Division (September 26, 1941 – December 27, 1941) 140th Rifle Division (December 1941 – August 19, 1942) 140th Rifle Division (October 26, 1942 - 1946)
- Active: 1939 - 1946
- Country: Soviet Union
- Branch: Red Army
- Type: Infantry
- Size: Division
- Engagements: Operation Barbarossa; Battle of Brody (1941); Battle of Uman; Operation Typhoon; Operation Blue; Sevsk-Trubchevsk offensive Oryol offensive Battle of Kursk; Operation Kutuzov; Battle of the Dnieper; Gomel-Rechitsa offensive Rovno–Lutsk offensive Proskurov–Chernovtsy offensive Lvov-Sandomierz Offensive; Battle of the Dukla Pass; Western Carpathian offensive Moravia–Ostrava offensive Prague offensive
- Decorations: Order of Lenin; Order of the Red Banner (2); Order of Suvorov; Order of Kutuzov (All 4th Formation)
- Battle honours: Siberian; Novgorod-Severski (4th Formation)

Commanders
- Notable commanders: Col. Luka Herasymovych Basanets; Col. Pavel Yefremovich Morozov; Maj. Gen. Ivan Andreevich Kopyak; Maj. Gen. Mikhail Aleksandrovich Yenshin; Maj. Gen. Aleksandr Yakovlevich Kiselyov; Col. Mikhail Markovich Vlasov

The 140th Rifle Division was first formed as an infantry division of the Red Army in August 1939 in the Kiev Military District, based on the shtat (table of organization and equipment) of September 13. The 140th might be regarded as the unluckiest division in the Army, as it, uniquely, had to be completely, or almost completely, re-formed three times between 1941 and 1943. In June 1941 the first formation was assigned to 6th Army in Southwestern Front and later Southern Front and was destroyed in the Uman pocket in early August during Operation Barbarossa, after fighting back nearly from the frontier.

A new 140th was created in late September by the redesignation of the 13th Moscow Militia (Opolcheniye) Division that had been formed in early July. Just after the start of Operation Typhoon in early October it was moved from Reserve Front to take up already compromised positions on the upper reaches of the Dniepr River, and while it fought valiantly over the following days it was soon encircled near Vyazma and only individuals and small groups were able to escape to friendly territory.

A third 140th began forming in the Moscow Military District in late December, just days after the 2nd formation was written off. This process took several months before it began moving south by rail to join 24th Army in Southern Front in May 1942, and then 9th Army in Southwestern Front. It arrived just as the German summer offensive was kicking off. 9th Army had been badly beaten up in fighting near Izium in May and June and, even with fresh reinforcements stood little chance against a full-blown panzer offensive on the Caucasian steppes. With much of the rest of the Army the 140th was encircled near Millerovo in late July and largely destroyed, being disbanded in August.

The final formation of the 140th was based on a division recruited from NKVD personnel at Novosibirsk in the Siberian Military District in October 1942. In February 1943 it was one of six such divisions that came under Red Army control as part of the new 70th Army, which was soon assigned to the reformed Central Front. During February and March, after concentrating near Kursk, it pushed toward Oryol, but this objective was not reached, in part due to ineffective Army leadership. It remained in this area through the spring and early summer, preparing for the German offensive that began in July, and played a key role in defeating one of the last armored drives of German 9th Army. Following this it participated in the defeat of the German Oryol grouping before advancing through eastern Ukraine as part of 65th Army in September, winning a battle honor in the process. It made important gains in the Gomel area during October and November before moving to reserve for rebuilding and replenishment, and then was transferred to 13th Army of 1st Ukrainian Front in December, soon being awarded the first of two Orders of the Red Banner. During the spring campaign in northwestern Ukraine it won a second Red Banner, and then, as a result of the fighting for Lviv in July it received a rare Order of Lenin, while its regiments were also decorated. It was now part of 38th Army, where it would remain for the duration of the war. This Army was transferred to 4th Ukrainian Front for the duration in November, and the 140th fought through the Carpathian Mountains during the winter of 1944/45. During this campaign in the south of Poland and Czechoslovakia it was further decorated with the Orders of Suvorov and Kutuzov, with many of its subunits also receiving awards. It ended the war as one of the most honored divisions in the Red Army. Despite this it was moved to western Ukraine in early 1946 and disbanded later that year.

== 1st Formation ==
The division was first organized on August 16, 1939, at Uman in the Ukrainian (later: Kiev Special) Military District. Col. Luka Herasymovych Basanets was appointed to command the division on the same day, and he would lead it through its entire 1st formation. This officer had served as an advisor to the Republican Army in the Spanish Civil War, and came to the 140th after commanding the 51st Rifle Division. On June 22, 1941, it was still in that District, located roughly between Shepetivka and Starokostiantyniv, and had the following order of battle:

- 445th Rifle Regiment
- 637th Rifle Regiment
- 798th Rifle Regiment
- 309th Artillery Regiment
- 361st Howitzer Regiment
- 263rd Antitank Battalion
- 143rd Antiaircraft Battalion
- 181st Reconnaissance Battalion
- 199th Sapper Battalion
- 148th Signal Battalion
- 227th Medical/Sanitation Battalion
- 201st Chemical Defense (Anti-gas) Platoon
- 146th Motor Transport Battalion
- 149th Field Bakery
- 175th Field Postal Station
- 349th Field Office of the State Bank

When the German invasion began, the 140th was assigned to the 36th Rifle Corps in Kiev Military District (Southwestern Front) reserves, which also contained the 146th and 228th Rifle Divisions. During June 24 the 140th was approaching Ostroh as it advanced westward while the 228th pushed on to Dubno. The next day the 11th Panzer Division drove the 228th out of Dubno and off to the northeast, while the 140th took up positions near Sudobychi and the 146th east of Kremenets by June 27. On the same day the 140th and 146th were assigned to 6th Army, facing elements of the German XXXXIV Army Corps north of Khmilnyk. The two divisions counterattacked at 1400 hours the next day in an effort to regain Dubno, but this proved unsuccessful. On June 29 the Front commander, Col. Gen. M. P. Kirponos, criticized the performance of 36th Corps, stating in part:

When fired upon in combat, subunits lacking materiel support do not advance, and block up the rear areas and roads... [There are] instances of panic (140th and 146th Rifle Divisions) when, even without seeing the enemy or seeing an insignificant number of the enemy, subunits run to the rear, casting away everything in their path, and subunit and unit commanders fail to undertake required measures to restore order.

By July 7 the division had essentially returned to near its starting point, east of Starokostiantyniv.

=== Battle of Uman ===
As of the end of July 14 the 140th was still holding just east of the Teteriv River north of Khmilnyk, but as the German drive was renewed it was forced to the southeast in the direction of Lypovets. By late July the division was in 49th Rifle Corps, still in 6th Army, near Monastyryshche, but was later relocated to Southern Front. In early August the division was trapped in the encirclement at Uman, and was destroyed by the middle of the month. The division number was finally deleted from the Soviet order of battle on September 19. Colonel Basanets survived the disaster and fought as a partisan behind the lines until early 1943 when he was able to cross to friendly territory. He was interned and investigated but after proving his bona fides he was made deputy commander of the 380th Rifle Division on May 5, and eventually led the 192nd Rifle Division into peacetime, being made a major general on May 5, 1945. He retired on January 19, 1956, and died on July 30, 1962.

== 2nd Formation ==
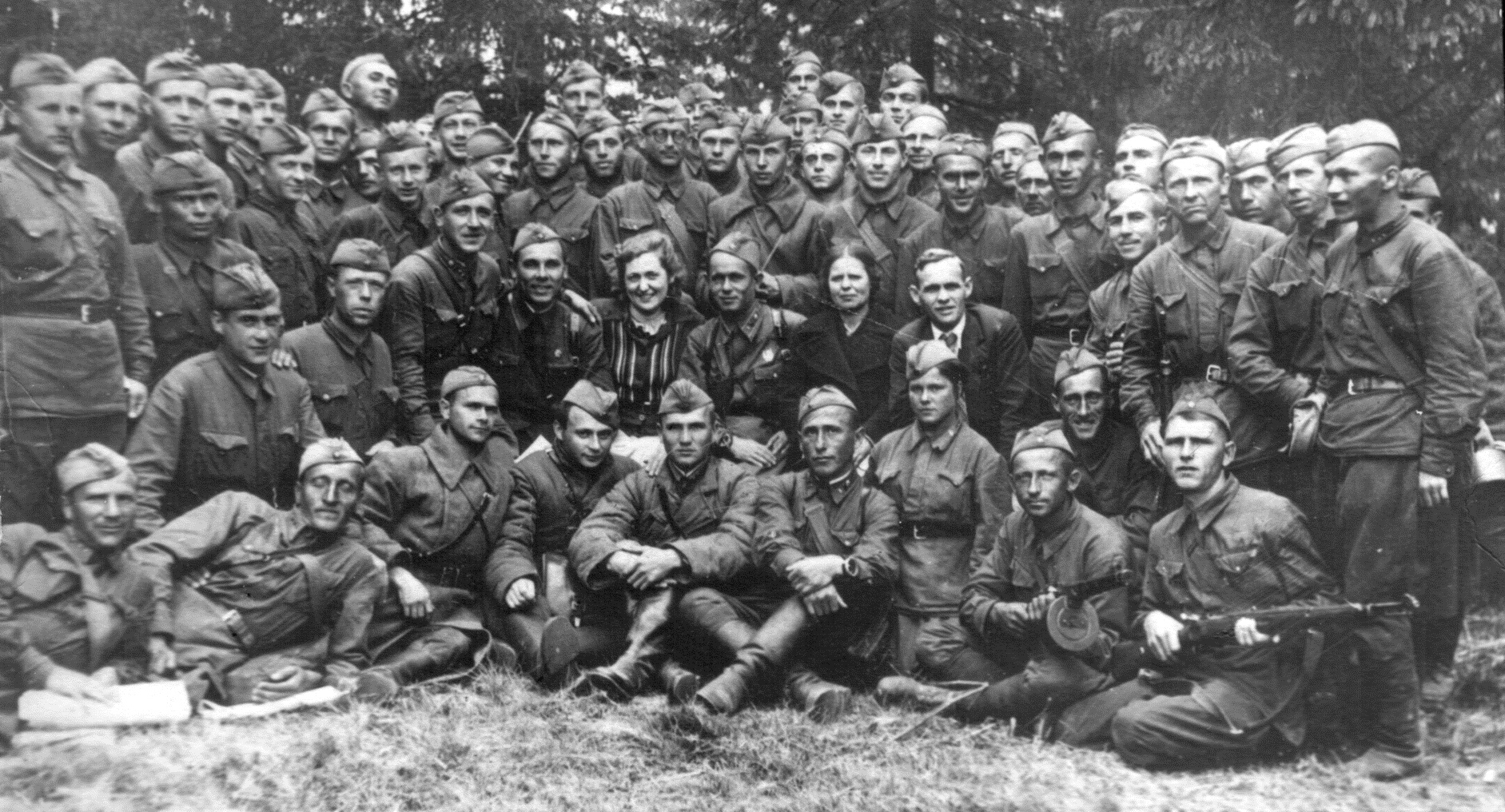
Personnel of the 13th Rostokino Militia Division

On July 2 the 13th Moscow Militia Division began forming in the Rostokino District of Moscow. Col. Pavel Yefremovich Morozov was appointed to command, where he would continue through the 2nd formation. This officer had been serving as an instructor in tactics at the Frunze Military Academy. The division's initial order of battle was as follows:

- 37th Militia Regiment
- 38th Militia Regiment
- 39th Militia Regiment
- Artillery Battalion (76mm)
- Artillery Battalion (45mm)
- Sapper, Reconnaissance and Signal Companies

By July 6 the division had 11,000 personnel assigned, including 1,000 members of the Communist Party and 700 Komsomols. Three days later the division had 13,000 personnel, but some were reassigned to other militia divisions to complete their establishments, so when the division left Moscow on July 15 it had 8,010 in the ranks, but little or no heavy equipment, motorized transport, or radios.

On July 16 the STAVKA ordered the construction of a new defense line centered on Mozhaisk, which was to be built and held by five NKVD and ten volunteer divisions of the new Reserve Front. The division was assigned to 32nd Army by July 19 and remained in the Reserve of the Supreme High Command in that Army until it was re-designated on September 27 as the new 140th Rifle Division. As of September 1 its revised order of battle was as follows:

- 1305th Rifle Regiment – from 37th Militia Regiment
- 1307th Rifle Regiment – from 38th Militia Regiment
- 1309th Rifle Regiment – from 39th Militia Regiment
- 977th Artillery Regiment – from Militia Artillery Battalion (76mm guns)
- 701st Antiaircraft Battalion
- 476th Reconnaissance Company
- 865th Signal Battalion
- 499th Medical/Sanitation Battalion
- 343rd Chemical Defense (Anti-gas) Company
- 311th Motor Transport Company
- 268th Field Bakery

On September 27 the order of battle was changed to be nearly identical to that of the 1st formation. Since 32nd Army was in the second echelon of the forces defending Moscow it was not in the immediate front lines.

=== Operation Typhoon ===
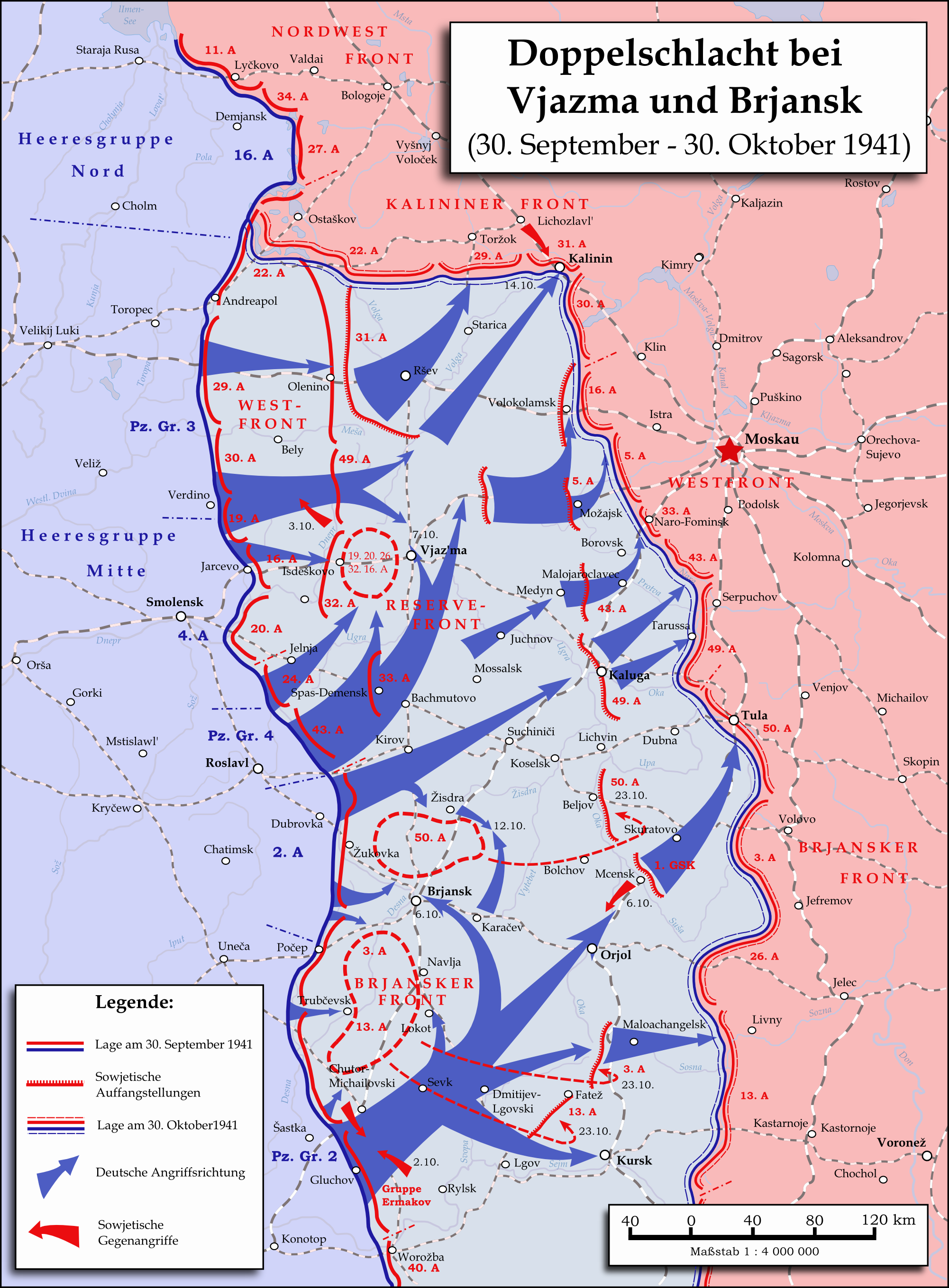
Operation Typhoon. Note positions of Reserve Front.

The southern grouping of Army Group Center (2nd Panzer Group, 2nd Army) launched their attack on September 30, while its main forces (3rd and 4th Panzer Groups, 4th and 9th Armies) began their part in the offensive on October 2, and broke through the Soviet front in several places within hours. In a prearranged move, the seven divisions of 49th Army were already preparing to entrain in the Rzhev area in response to the southern attack, unaware that the main blow would be coming two days later. The 140th was also on the move by road on the morning of October 2 to take over the positions of the 194th and one regiment of the 248th Rifle Division on the east bank of the Dniepr River. Colonel Morozov set up his headquarters at Mikhalevo, but he had no communications with the adjacent 19th Army. It was at about the same time that the 6th Panzer Division took bridgeheads on the 248th's sector as it was attempting to entrain. This part of the Dniepr is neither very wide (25m-40m) nor very deep (3.0m maximum) but it still constituted a significant antitank obstacle providing the covering works were properly manned, which they were not in the prevailing confusion.

It was only on October 3 that the commander of 32nd Army, Maj. Gen. S. V. Vishnevskii, became aware that the main German force was attacking, and in the evening he was informed that a group of some 100 German tanks had appeared in front of the 140th near Kholm-Zhirkovskii. At 1950 hours on October 4 the deputy commander of Western Front, Lt. Gen. S. A. Kalinin, reported to the commander, Col. Gen. I. S. Konev, as follows regarding the situation on the east bank of the Dniepr:

...[the enemy's] forward units, having infiltrated beyond the Dnepr River, continue to occupy the villages Tikhanovo, Glushkovo, Alad'ino and Ust'e. His strength in this region is not more than a battalion with 20 tanks.
On the prepared line along the eastern bank of Dnepr River, the 140th Rifle Division is occupying the sector between the mouth of the Viaz'ma River and Sopotov. It reached this line on 2.10; its front is 25 kilometres. Two regiments are in the first echelon, one in the second. It [the line] is poorly occupied. Prepared entrenchments and log bunkers are not being utilized.

At the same time the 248th Division was returning from its attempt to entrain. From this point much would depend on the promptness and resolve of Vishnevskii to contain or eliminate the bridgeheads. In a summary from his headquarters at 2100 it was stated, in part, that communications with the 140th and 2nd Rifle Divisions were "normal" but much of the rest of his forces could only be reached by messengers. 32nd Army was also out of contact with Konev.

On October 5, Konev sent orders to Lt. Gen. I. V. Boldin, commander of a group of units under his name, and who was defending Kholm-Zhirkovskii with elements of the 101st Motorized Division, to use his remaining forces against the German troops facing the 140th and restore the Dniepr defenses between Nikolo-Nemoshchenki and Seltso. This proved impossible as Group Boldin was unable to disengage from its current positions, and neither Boldin nor Konev had communication with Vishnevskii. The 248th was also unable to retake its old positions. By 1600 hours on October 6 Vishnevskii only had full command over two regiments of that division near Pigulino and two regiments of 18th Rifle Division in the Mostovaia–Pashutino area. Kalinin reported at 2100 reported on the 248th that "two regiments engaged the enemy, were placed under pressure, and are retreating." Vishnevskii was "reinforcing the 248th Rifle Division with a regiment from the 140th Rifle Division. But this is insufficient." Based on his report from early that morning it was apparent that the 6th and 7th Panzer Divisions, with the 129th Infantry Division, had broken out of the Glushkovo and Tikhanovo bridgeheads and were moving on Vyazma.

By now, much too late to be effective, Western Front set about organizing the retreat of its most advanced forces. Specifically, 19th Army had been ordered to start withdrawing overnight on October 5/6 to the east bank of the Dniepr to cover the Vyazma axis, taking the 2nd and 140th under command in the process. In the event this move had only begun at 1000 on October 6. Konev had ordered 32nd Army to attack the columns of German troops on the route to Vyazma from the southeast; in conjunction with this Vishnevskii reported at 1150 that the 18th, 248th, and 140th had all suffered heavy losses in personnel and equipment. Vyazma was poorly defended, and the chief of its garrison, Maj. Gen. I. S. Nikitin, attempted to organize a defense to the northeast based on the 140th. Western Front itself was unaware of the city's vulnerability. By 1850 on October 6 the panzers were only 40km away.

At 0640 hours on October 7 Konev sent orders to the commanders of 19th and 20th Armies:

Enemy motor and mechanized units have emerged in the vicinity of Viaz'ma and have cut the highway... I order you to take control of [the] troops, which have wound up west of Viaz'ma, and in addition detach the necessary strength from the 19th Army and destroy the enemy in the Viaz'ma area. The city of Viaz'ma is occupied by our forces.

General Vishnevskii reported at 1600:

1. ... up to 10 enemy tanks have broken through in the Vysokoe area [9km north of Volochek] and are putting pressure on the 18th Rifle Division. Evidently this enemy grouping is moving toward Sychevka. Between the 18th and 140th Rifle Divisions there is a gap of 30 kilometres, filled with enemy groups approximately on the line Karasevo-Belousovo-Nastas'ino. ...
5. The 248th Rifle Division as a result of stubborn fighting 4-6 October has been rendered combat ineffective and is reorganizing in the Baranovo area. The division has managed to assemble up to 600 men and through the efforts of the 140th Rifle Division, another 900 men have been collected.
6. The 140th Rifle Division is engaged in bitter fighting in the Kriushino, Mikhalevo area against the penetrating enemy tank grouping and is holding a line along the Dnepr River from Ust'e to Molosovo.
The 143rd Tank Brigade, two batteries of an antitank regiment, and a tank-hunting detachment from the 140th Rifle Division are assembling for a counterattack in the Mikhalevo area. I have no more means for restoring the situation on this sector. There are 7 T-34 and 8 T-26 in the 143rd Tank Brigade in readiness...
I have no communications with Boldin or the 19th Army.

He went on to state his intention to begin the counterattack on the morning of October 8.

==== Escape from the pocket ====
At 1625 hours on October 7 Konev had signalled to Boldin: "Get out quickly... Energetically break through to the Gzhatsk line in cooperation with Lukin [commander of 19th Army]. Act decisively, preserve equipment and manpower." 7th Panzer linked up with the 10th Panzer Division of 4th Panzer Group near Vyazma in the evening of October 7, sealing the pocket. The city itself had been taken by 1520. At this point, with the situation of 19th Army increasingly muddled, the 140th came under the command of Group Boldin, along with the 143rd Tanks. The Group was in combat with German units along the Vyazma River, to the south of Ordylevo and Belyi Bereg. The STAVKA would finally receive a report from Lukin late on October 11 in which he stated that late on October 7 that the remnants of the 140th were defending in separate groups, one at Bakovo and the other at Khitrovo, while a composite group of some 200 men of the 140th and 248th were in the woods southwest of Lomy. He also announced his intention to take the forces of the 140th, 91st, and 214th Rifle Divisions on the attack to the north and northeast on October 8. At that time he estimated each division had some 500-600 infantry remaining. In the event, Lukin's headquarters near Lomy came under attack from 6th Panzer's 114th Motorized Regiment, ending any prospect of this counterblow.

Lukin now realized his forces were encircled, and he began preparing to withdraw, beginning overnight on October 8/9. His objective was to reach the Mozhaisk line. In the afternoon of the 9th Lukin managed to restore communications with Western Front and reported that he had met with Boldin the previous day, and that the 140th and 210th Rifle Divisions had been transferred to Group Boldin. Boldin was said to be withdrawing in three groups toward Gzhatsk. This move had been anticipated by Army Group Center and the route was well defended; this first breakout effort failed. In addition, Gzhatsk itself was taken on October 9. By the next day the size of the pocket had shrunk to about 18km-20km east to west and 20km-25km north to south.

Boldin and Lukin now prepared a joint plan for a breakout to begin at 1600 hours on October 11. This time, rather than using column formations, the forces would be arranged in two echelons in order to punch a hole and cover the flanks of the penetration. Only a single KV-1 tank remained among three tank brigades. The 91st and 140th Divisions comprised the reserve. The Bogoroditskoye–Spas axis was identified as the boundary between 6th Panzer and 5th Infantry Divisions. Bridges to cross the swampy Bebria River would be required for the remaining vehicles and heavy equipment. This breakout effort also failed, at heavy cost; it was no longer realistic to attempt to withdraw road-bound equipment. only some remnants of the 91st and 2nd Divisions managed to escape. The 140th remained with Boldin, and its remnants reached friendly territory at Spas late in the month after the pocket had been more-or-less mopped up and the German screening forces had been removed. Colonel Morozov was killed in action on October 28.

In the end the 140th was one of five divisions based on Moscow militia divisions that were encircled and destroyed in this offensive, although it was not officially disbanded until December 27. Enough personnel escaped from the encirclement to make a cadre for the next formation of the division.

== 3rd Formation ==
The third formation of the 140th Rifle Division began in late December, based on escaped elements of the previous formation. The order of battle was very similar to that of the first formation:

- 445th Rifle Regiment
- 637th Rifle Regiment
- 798th Rifle Regiment
- 309th Artillery Regiment
- 263rd Antitank Battalion
- 101st Antiaircraft Battery
- 94th Mortar Battalion
- 181st Reconnaissance Company
- 199th Sapper Battalion
- 148th Signal Battalion
- 227th Medical/Sanitation Battalion
- 201st Chemical Defense (Anti-gas) Company
- 146th Motor Transport Company
- 412th Field Bakery
- 873rd Divisional Veterinary Hospital
- 1716th Field Postal Station
- 1057th Field Office of the State Bank

Maj. Gen. Ivan Andreevich Kopyak was appointed divisional commander on January 29, 1942. This officer had previously led the 112th (Motorized) Rifle Division. The unit remained in the Moscow Military District until May.

In late May the 140th was transferred to the 24th Army in the Reserve of the Supreme High Command and sent south. 24th Army arrived in Southern Front just at the opening of the German summer offensive in late June. In early July the division was transferred to the reserves of 9th Army, in Southwestern Front. This Army had suffered heavy losses during the Second Battle of Kharkov in May, and again in Operation Fridericus II during June 22-25.

=== Operation Blau ===
The OKH began the second stage of Operation Blau on July 6. After a headlong advance on limited fuel, the next day the 3rd Panzer Division reached the Kalitva River at Rossosh, seizing bridges and even part of Southwestern Front's headquarters. The day previous the STAVKA had authorized a general withdrawal by the Front, according to which 9th Army was to pull back to a new line from Belokurakino to Mostki to Kremennaya. As the left-flank (southern) unit of the Front, the 9th was ordered to hold this line firmly in order to cover the evacuation of industrial plant in and around Lysychansk. At dawn on July 8, Army Group South became aware of the withdrawal of 9th and 38th Armies and ordered the infantry on the right wing of 1st Panzer to begin a pursuit across the Oskil and Northern Donets Rivers. The forces of XI and XXXXIV Army Corps crossed both to reach the Krasna, defended by the 9th and part of the 38th. 1st Panzer now shifted the III and XIV Panzer Corps to the same axis to break through between the two Soviet Fronts. The 9th had five rifle divisions remaining, including the 140th, in first echelon, plus three more and two antitank brigades in second echelon or reserve. The Army commander, Lt. Gen. A. I. Lopatin, also had the depleted 5th Cavalry Corps and roughly 65 tanks available.

The German attack came at daybreak on July 9. Lysychansk was taken the next day, and soon most of 38th Army and one division of the 9th had been encircled between the Aidar and Chertkovo Rivers. On July 12 Southwestern Front ordered Lopatin to withdraw his remaining forces southward to join Southern Front's retreat to the Don River. Meanwhile, both panzer corps pushed the rearguards of 9th and 38th Armies while also outflanking the supposed "final" defense line of Southern Front. By July 17, 9th Army was still making a hasty withdrawal to the south. Two days later it was pocketed, along with much of 24th and 37th Armies, south of Millerovo, and was fighting to escape along the Glubokaya River. In the effort to break out much of the remaining strength of the 140th was destroyed. It is listed as "reorganizing" in the Caucasus region on August 1, and as of August 7 General Kopyak was listed as "missing in action, presumed killed in action". Nominal command passed to Col. Grigorii Osipovich Lyaskin the next day but the attempt to reform was abandoned and the division was officially disbanded on August 19.

== 4th Formation ==
The final formation of the division began on October 26, 1942, as the Siberian Rifle Division, at Novosibirsk in the Siberian Military District. Its first commander, Maj. Gen. Mikhail Aleksandrovich Yenshin, was appointed on November 1. It consisted of:

- 96th "Chita" Rifle Regiment
- 258th "Khabarovsk" Rifle Regiment
- 283rd "Krasnoufimsk" Rifle Regiment
- 371st "Sibirsk" Artillery Regiment
- 92nd Antitank Battalion
- 69th Reconnaissance Company
- 87th Sapper Battalion
- 596th Signal Battalion (later 656th Signal Company)
- 87th Medical/Sanitation Battalion
- 27th Chemical Defense (Anti-gas) Company
- 341st Motor Transport Company
- 61st Field Bakery
- 41st Divisional Veterinary Hospital
- 2278th Field Postal Station
- 1781st Field Office of the State Bank

The NKVD began forming the division, and three others, to serve as NKVD rifle divisions prior to being authorized by the Commissar of Defense on December 7. The division was passed to Red Army control as the 140th on February 5, 1943, and it entered the active army ten days later. It retained the name "Siberian" as an honorific. At that time it had 8,685 officers and men assigned, 69 percent of whom were under 30 years of age, quite a youthful cadre for a late-war division. They were also noted as being 50 percent Russian nationality, 15 percent Ukrainian, and the remaining 35 percent mixed non-Slavic. Officially these men were drawn from internal troops and border guards of the NKVD. As the Siberian Military District had no external borders, it's likely that some were taken from guards of the GULAG and other sources that were off-limits to the Red Army.

As with the other NKVD divisions, the 140th was assigned to the 70th Army in the Central Front, under the terms of this decree issued by Marshal G. K. Zhukov:

"The Stavka of the Supreme High Command orders:

1. Name the Separate Army formed by the People's Commissariat of Internal Affairs of the USSR, consisting of six rifle divisions, with separate reinforcing and support units, the 70th Army and include it in the Red Army on 1 February.
2. Give the formations of the 70th Army the following designations:

- The 102nd Far Eastern Rifle Division,
- The 106th Trans-Baikal Rifle Division,
- The 140th Siberian Rifle Division,
- The 162nd Central Asian Rifle Division,
- The 175th Ural Rifle Division,
- The 181st Stalingrad Rifle Division

3. Determine the numbering and table of organization and composition of the units of 70th Army in accordance with the instructions of the Chief of the Red Army Glavupraform."

The 140th had already loaded aboard trains and was moving west.

=== Sevsk-Trubchevsk Offensive ===
70th Army was assigned to the re-deploying Don Front (soon re-designated Central Front) under command of Col. Gen. K. K. Rokossovskii. It took some time before Rokossovskii could knock it into shape as a front-line formation, forcing him to remove many senior, ex-NKVD officers. Rokossovskii had received detailed instructions from the STAVKA early on February 6, directing him to, among other things, concentrate 70th Army's units by February 14 in the Volovo, Dolgorukovo, and Livny areas as they arrived and then send them off in the wake of the Front's first echelon. In the event, this deployment schedule was impossible to meet, due to shortages of rolling stock, damage to the rails themselves, and winter weather, so the start of Central Front's offensive was postponed until February 25.

At the same time, Rokossovskii made changes in his operational plan. In the first phase, Central Front would break through the German line from Nikolskoe to Karmanovo to Mashkino to Olshanka with the objective of reaching the rail line from Bryansk to Konotop. After this, the axis of the attack would be toward Sevsk and Unecha Station to cut the line from Bryansk to Gomel. This first phase would require covering up to 250km through deep snow and with a paucity of roads. 70th Army would join in the second phase, with the objective of capturing Mogilev by March 28 after concentrating in the Kursk area on February 23. These ambitious objectives proved well beyond the Army's capabilities. On February 24 Rokossovskii's chief of operations reported, in part, that the Army had largely completed unloading and was proceeding on two march routes, with the 140th, 102nd and 181st approaching Kosorzha with the rear of the column passing through Volovo. He also reported that each division contained 9,000-11,000 personnel, but up to 75 percent of authorized horses were missing, and there were no tractors at all for the 122mm howitzers in the artillery regiments, so they had to remain where they had been unloaded.

The strategic situation was changing by this time. Already on February 20 the XXXX Panzer Corps of Army Group South had struck the advancing forces of Southwestern Front, scoring immediate gains in the Barvinkove area. A few days later, further overextended mobile formations were destroyed by XXXXVIII Panzer Corps and the SS Panzer Corps. The STAVKA was slow to acknowledge the situation, expecting Rokossovskii's anticipated advance to make the setbacks irrelevant. This began as planned on February 25 as Central Front continued to take advantage of the weaknesses along the boundary of 2nd and 2nd Panzer Armies. The Front was led by 2nd Tank, 13th, and 65th Armies as 70th Army was still two days to the rear. German resistance at Dmitriev-Lgovsky was determined, so the 11th Tank Corps swung southward to bypass the town and drove headlong toward Sevsk, more than 50km to the west.

Rokossovskii's armies had achieved significant success by March 1. 65th Army had pushed a deep salient toward Komarichi and Trosna, and despite the arrival of 78th Infantry Division the next day the Army commander, Lt. Gen. P. I. Batov, remained confident as 70th Army arrived in his support; the 140th was now some 25km south of the latter place. Dmitriev-Lgovsky had been abandoned, but the garrison began a fighting withdrawal, covering the road to Bryansk, and the rate of advance in the center slowed. The direction also changed from Sevsk–Trubchevsk and more toward Komarichi and Lokat, where German reserves were gathering. During the next five days Central Front made only marginal gains in the center and on the right. On the left much greater (and somewhat misleading) progress was made as 70th Army more fully joined the 65th against the defenses of 76th Infantry and 12th Panzer Divisions on the southern approaches to Oryol. Under Rokossovskii's urgings, the commander of 70th Army, Maj. Gen. G. F. Tarasov, pushed his forces against Trosna without success and at high cost, and it became apparent to all no further advance was possible without additional reinforcements.

=== Oryol Offensive ===
These began arriving in the form of 21st Army from Stalingrad. Determined not to repeat the mistake he made in committing 70th Army piecemeal, Rokossovskii gave it several days to fully assemble around Fatezh before reinforcing Batov and Tarasov. Finally, in the last days of February the STAVKA began to grasp the gravity of the situation created by Army Groups South's counterstroke south of Kharkiv, and began shifting the flow of reserves which had been intended for Central Front. At 2130 hours on March 7 Rokossovskii's mission was changed. Instead of striking deeply at Bryansk and beyond he was to cooperate with Western and Bryansk Fronts in encircling and defeating the German forces in the salient around Oryol:

... 2. Turn the forces of General Batov's, Tarasov's, and Chistiakov's armies from the west toward the north and northeast, with the missions to destroy the enemy's Dmitrovsk-Orlovskii group of forces and cut the railroad line between Briansk and Orel somewhere east of Karachev with the combined forces of these armies and, by doing so, help the Briansk Front liquidate the enemy's Orel group of forces.

The 2nd Tank, 65th and 70th Armies would deploy left to right along the Usozha River with 21st Army joining as soon as possible.

Rokossovskii sent out his orders for the revised plan in the afternoon of March 8, and these expected an early arrival of 21st Army. Tarasov was directed to continue its advance on the morning on March 9 "in the general direction of Volobuevo, Apal'kovo, and Naryshkino" and subsequently capture a series of lines before taking the Oryol region in conjunction with 21st Army around March 14. The 140th had reached the front line near Aleksandrovskii, near the boundary between 12th Panzer and 76th Infantry. On the same day the 65th and 2nd Tank Armies made gains, but 2nd Panzer Army began to receive reserves and 70th Army stalled. Meanwhile, the changing situation was producing command confusion within STAVKA; effective March 12 Bryansk Front was disbanded, with three armies shifted to Central Front. The following day a new Reserve Front was established. On March 14 two infantry divisions of 2nd Army began a counterattack east of Hlukhiv against a thin screen on the left flank of Central Front which soon put 2nd Guards Cavalry Corps in an untenable position. Rokossovskii had few options available. An attack by 16th Army north of Oryol had utterly failed, his own progress was minimal, and Army Group South had renewed its offensive against Voronezh Front south of Kharkiv, which had fallen on March 15. As the panzers moved north, Central Front was in jeopardy. 21st Army was reassigned to Voronezh Front, which ended any possibility that Rokossovskii could successfully continue his offensive, although he continued limited operations until March 21.

General Enshin left the 140th on March 18; he would later lead the 307th and 362nd Rifle Divisions during the war, being made a Hero of the Soviet Union on April 6, 1945, before an extensive postwar career, reaching the rank of lieutenant general in 1955 before retiring in 1958. He was succeeded by Col. Zinovii Samoilovich Shekhtman, who was in turn succeeded on May 11 by Maj. Gen. Aleksandr Yakovlevich Kiselyov. The 140th was this NKVD officer's first front-line command.

On April 4 Rokossovskii issued a long decree in which he extensively critiqued the performance of 70th Army and requested that the STAVKA relieve General Tarasov of his command. He focused on fighting in the second half of March for the villages of Svetlyi Luch, Novaia Ialta, Rzhavchik, Muravchik and Hill 260.2 which led to losses of 8,849 personnel killed and wounded, as well as a good deal of equipment. He blamed this, first, on inadequate reconnaissance and poor provision of artillery support. Lack of cooperation with supporting tanks was also noted. No specific criticisms were directed at the 140th. Tarasov was soon removed, being replaced by Lt. Gen. I. V. Galanin.

== Battle of Kursk ==
70th Army remained along the line it had gained in March through the rest of the spring and into July. This formed the northwestern corner of the Kursk salient, with 65th Army on its left flank and 13th Army on its right. By late April the STAVKA had decided to go over to the strategic defensive and prepare for a German offensive against the salient, which all intelligence indicated was in the works. The preparation of extensive fortifications was put in hand. The reinforced 70th Army occupied a sector 62km in length. It was not expected to come under attack initially except along its boundary with 13th Army, as the German forces were considered most likely to launch a classic pincer movement against the bases of the salient. However, one variant considered possible by Rokossovskii was a main attack on 70th Army's front in the direction of Fatezh and Kursk.

German plan of attack at Kursk. Note position of 70th Army.

As of July 5, when the offensive began, Galanin had eight rifle divisions under his command, plus three tank regiments, ten artillery and mortar regiments, and an antitank brigade. The 140th was one of two divisions, with the 175th, that were under direct Army command and was in the Army's second echelon, along with the 175th, 162nd, and 132nd Rifle Divisions. The tank regiments were grouped behind the right flank where the German attack was most likely. Galanin had placed his headquarters in the woods north of Radogoshcha.

At 0210 hours Rokossovskii ordered an artillery counter-preparation along his Front's right wing. This lasted 20 minutes with mixed results, but delayed the start of the offensive between 1 1/2 and 2 hours. The German artillery preparation began at 0430. The main attack of German 9th Army was directed at Olkhovatka, but a secondary thrust by elements of XXXXVI Panzer Corps (7th Infantry and 20th Panzer Divisions) was made at the boundary of 13th and 70th Armies at Gnilets. This struck the 132nd and 280th Rifle Divisions but made only marginal gains. However, a group of tanks and motorized infantry managed to penetrate the left flank of 13th Army and got into the rear of the 132nd. Later in the day this division began to fall back under renewed pressure from XXXXVI Corps. However, German losses were very high and the Soviet line remained intact.

On July 7, the third day of the battle, elements of the division were holding the village of Samodurovka. From there they were conducting long-range anti-tank fire against the flank of a battlegroup from 2nd Panzer Division advancing on the key objective of Olkhovatka. The battlegroup commander, Col. Arnold Burmeister, diverted some of his armor, including Tigers, towards this threat, and drove the Soviet forces from the village, destroying a supporting company of T-34s in the process. Lacking infantry, Burmeister chose to leave Samodurovka vacant, and it was reoccupied by Soviet troops overnight. The next day, the fresh 4th Panzer Division was committed, retaking Samodurovka before beginning to advance on Teploye, which was held in strength by the 140th, backed by the 3rd Anti-Tank Brigade and the 79th Tank Brigade from the 19th Tank Corps. One battalion of the division was overrun and the German forces occupied part of the town before running into a "wall of fire" from dug-in tanks and anti-tank guns. The stand of the 140th at Teploye, along with that of the 307th Rifle Division at Ponyri, proved to be the high-water marks of 9th Army's advance. At the end of the day Rokossovskii declared to his army commanders that "We have won the defensive battle, and our new mission is to finish off the defeated enemy by the launching of a decisive offensive."

=== Operation Kutuzov ===
The Western and Bryansk Fronts went over to the offensive against the Oryol salient on July 12. On the same day Rokossovskii ordered his Front to be ready to go over to the attack on July 15. Apart from the 13th, his armies had emerged relatively unscathed from the defensive battle. 70th Army, with the 19th Tank Corps, was to hold a line from Katomki to Shepelevo to Verkhnyaya Grankina to Chern using three divisions while the remaining forces were to attack from Teploe to Muravl. They were first to destroy the forces of 9th Army that had penetrated the Front's positions and regain the original line by the end of July 17. Following this, they were to continue to advance in the general direction of Oryol. In the first phase the 70th was to specifically cooperate with 13th and 48th Armies, as well as 16th Air Army. After an extensive regrouping the 140th was deployed north of Teploe.

On the first day, in common with most of the Front, Galinin's forces only made slight gains. The following morning, units on his right wing defeated the German grouping in the area of Height 250 and reached the area of Gnilets. German resistance was stubborn, based on covering detachments of infantry and tanks (some disabled from the earlier fighting) as the main forces fell back to their July 5 jumping-off positions. These had been well prepared over months and the German command expected to halt the offensive here. At about this time the 140th was assigned to the 19th Rifle Corps.

The commander of 9th Army, Gen. W. Model, demanded that his troops maintain these positions, but Central Front's right wing armies maintained their momentum and on July 21 broke through the line along the Ochka River before pushing onward toward Kamenets and Kromy. During the following 10 days the 13th and 70th Armies made a steady advance despite desperate counterattacks. By the end of August 1 they had reached a line from Nadezhda to Krasnikovo while continuing the march on Kromy. On August 4, elements of Bryansk Front's 3rd Army liberated Oryol. The right wing armies of Central Front took Kromy on August 6 and by the end of August 11 had reached a line from Mytskoe to outside Dmitrovsk-Orlovskii. This town was taken the next day, and by August 17-18 a line from Glybochka to Terekhovka to Uporoi had been reached. This line contained previously prepared positions in some depth (the Hagen Line), and during the following days the advance slowed considerably. On September 8 the 371st Artillery Regiment would be awarded the Order of the Red Banner for its successes in the Kursk fighting and following battles.

== Into Ukraine and Belarus ==
Maj. Gen. Aleksandr Yakovlevich Kiselyov, Hero of the Soviet Union

Central Front struck 2nd Army's center at Sevsk and east flank at Klintsy on August 26. The Front's forces quickly broke the German line with 60th Army in the lead. On September 2 the XIII Army Corps was ordered to fall back to the west and maintain contact with Army Group South, but instead was pushed south across the Seym River into the 4th Panzer Army sector, thereby opening a 30km wide gap between Army Groups South and Center. The following day, 2nd Army withdrew to the Desna River as General Rokossovskii paused to regroup. On September 9 the Front's forces forced this river south of Novhorod-Siverskyi and at Otsekin. During the advance the division assisted in liberating the town of Novhorod-Siverskyi and was given its name as a divisional honorific:

NOVGOROD-SEVERSKII – ... 140th Rifle Division (Major General Kiselyov, Aleksandr Yakovlevich)... The troops that participated in the liberation of Novgorod-Severskii, by order of the Supreme Commander-in-Chief of 16 September 1943 and a commendation in Moscow, are given a salute of 12 artillery salvoes by 124 guns.

=== Gomel-Rechytsa Offensive ===
On October 1 the division was still in 19th Corps, along with the 37th Guards, 162nd, and 354th Rifle Divisions. The Corps, along with most of 65th Army, was facing the XX Army Corps of 2nd Army. Over the next two days the 65th, and 61st Army to the south, reached the Sozh River on a sector some 70km wide from south of Gomel to west of Dubrovka. The 102nd Division, now on the extreme left (south) flank of 48th Army, linked up with 19th Corps as it prepared to force a crossing of the Sozh. The 354th had already taken a small bridgehead over the Sozh from the German 6th Infantry Division, and Batov quickly reinforced this with a handful of tanks. His immediate objective was to expand this lodgement and force Army Group Center to abandon Gomel. To this end he pushed the 37th Guards and 140th into the bridgehead and went over to the attack on October 1. By late the next day the depth of the holding had increased to 4km in heavy fighting, but the commitment of reserves from 216th Infantry Division brought 19th Corps to a halt, even after Batov countered by committing the 162nd. The town of Zherebnaya, which controlled the southern approaches to Gomel, remained in German hands.

By October 20, 65th Army's attacks had bogged down on this sector, and the offensive towards Gomel was temporarily halted. Central Front was now redesignated as Belorussian Front. Previously, on October 15, an attack by forces on the left wing of the Front forced a passage across the Dniepr in the area of Loyew and gained ground fast; by October 20 the Soviet forces had carved out a bridgehead 90km wide and 16km deep on the river's west bank and went on to try to cut the rail line from Rechytsa to Gomel. Heavy fighting raged for more than a week until 2nd Army was forced to begin a phased withdrawal to new positions in the rear. By October 28, 27th Rifle Corps had linked up with 61st Army northwest of Loyew but the forces of both armies had by now "shot their bolt", and a halt was called on October 30. During the following 10 days the Front carried out a major regrouping, with 65th Army displacing to the south to enter the Loyew bridgehead with most of its forces. Batov's troops were deployed in the center of the bridgehead with 19th Corps in the center of the Army. The 162nd and 37th Guards were in first echelon on a 5km-wide sector from Lipniaki to west of Bushatin, with 140th Division in second echelon and 18th Rifle Corps on the right. The immediate objective was to pierce the defenses between Gansharov Podel and Budishche to a depth of 5km, along the junction between XX Corps' 2nd Panzer and 31st Infantry Divisions.

The renewed offensive began on November 10. In the first three days Rokossovskii's forces tore a gap some 15km wide and 8-12km deep in the defenses from west of Uborok to the Dniepr north of Velin, putting them halfway to Rechytsa. 19th Corps was supported by the lead brigades of 1st Guards Tank Corps and 7th Guards Cavalry Corps and, together with 27th Corps, carved out the penetration that could then be exploited into the operational rear by the mobile forces beginning late on November 12. Before long two brigades of 1st Guards Tanks were racing to the north with all three divisions of 19th Corps following closely. Heavy street fighting began in Rechytsa on November 15. The city was defended by the 203rd Security Division, along with withdrawing elements of 45th and 36th Infantry Divisions. The two rifle corps continued marching northward past the city in an effort to reach Parychy, some 80km farther on. 37th Guards reached the Berezina River near Gorval, flanked by the 162nd and 140th, early on November 20, and the Guardsmen even took a small bridgehead on the west bank. Rechytsa was largely abandoned the same day.

The taking of Rechytsa and the bridgehead over the Berezina threatened the flanks of both XXXV Army Corps, still defending Gomel, and the positions of 9th Army along the Sozh. Rokosovskii's bold thrust would have to be reinforced before 9th and 2nd Armies could bring up forces to cut it off. Between November 23-30 another regrouping took place, in which the 140th and 162nd were moved north to join 18th Rifle Corps north of Kalinkavichy, while 19th and 27th Corps were reinforced with other units to continue the northward advance. This would lead to considerable back-and-forth fighting in the vicinity of Svyetlahorsk. By the end of the month the 140th was depleted to the point that it was removed to the 121st Rifle Corps, under direct Front command, for rebuilding.

== Into Western Ukraine and Czechoslovakia ==
The STAVKA sent orders to Rokossovskii on December 9 to transfer six rifle divisions, including the 140th, to 1st Ukrainian Front. On December 13 the division was assigned to 13th Army's 24th Rifle Corps in that Front. Under these commands it took part in the Rovno–Lutsk offensive, and on January 3, 1944, it received its first Order of the Red Banner for general exemplary performance, valor and courage. Later that month it was transferred to 28th Rifle Corps under direct Front command, and in February this Corps was transferred to the 60th Army of the same Front.

1st Ukrainian Front launched its part of the Proskurov–Chernovtsy offensive on March 4, and on March 19 the 140th was awarded an unusual second Order of the Red Banner for its role in the liberation of Starokostiantyniv and several other towns in the area. In July the 140th was reassigned to the 101st Rifle Corps of 38th Army, and remained in this Army for the duration of the war.

=== Lvov–Sandomierz Offensive ===
In the planning for this operation in July the 38th Army was to penetrate the German defense in the Bzovitsa and Bogdanovka sector on a front of 6km. It would then develop the offensive with seven divisions in the direction of Peremyshliany with the objective of encircling the German Lviv grouping in cooperation with the 4th Tank and 60th Armies. The offensive began on July 13 and went largely according to this plan; Lviv was liberated on July 27 and by August 4 units of 4th Tank and 38th Armies were fighting in positions from Khyriv to north of Sambir and further along the Dniestr River to Rozvaduv.

On August 10 the division was awarded the Order of Lenin for "exemplary fulfillment of command tasks" and its "valor and courage" in the liberation of Lviv, an unusual distinction for a regular rifle division. In addition, all three of the division's rifle regiments were given the Order of the Red Star, and the 371st Artillery Regiment received the Order of Bogdan Khmelnitsky, 2nd Degree.

== Into Poland and the Carpathians ==
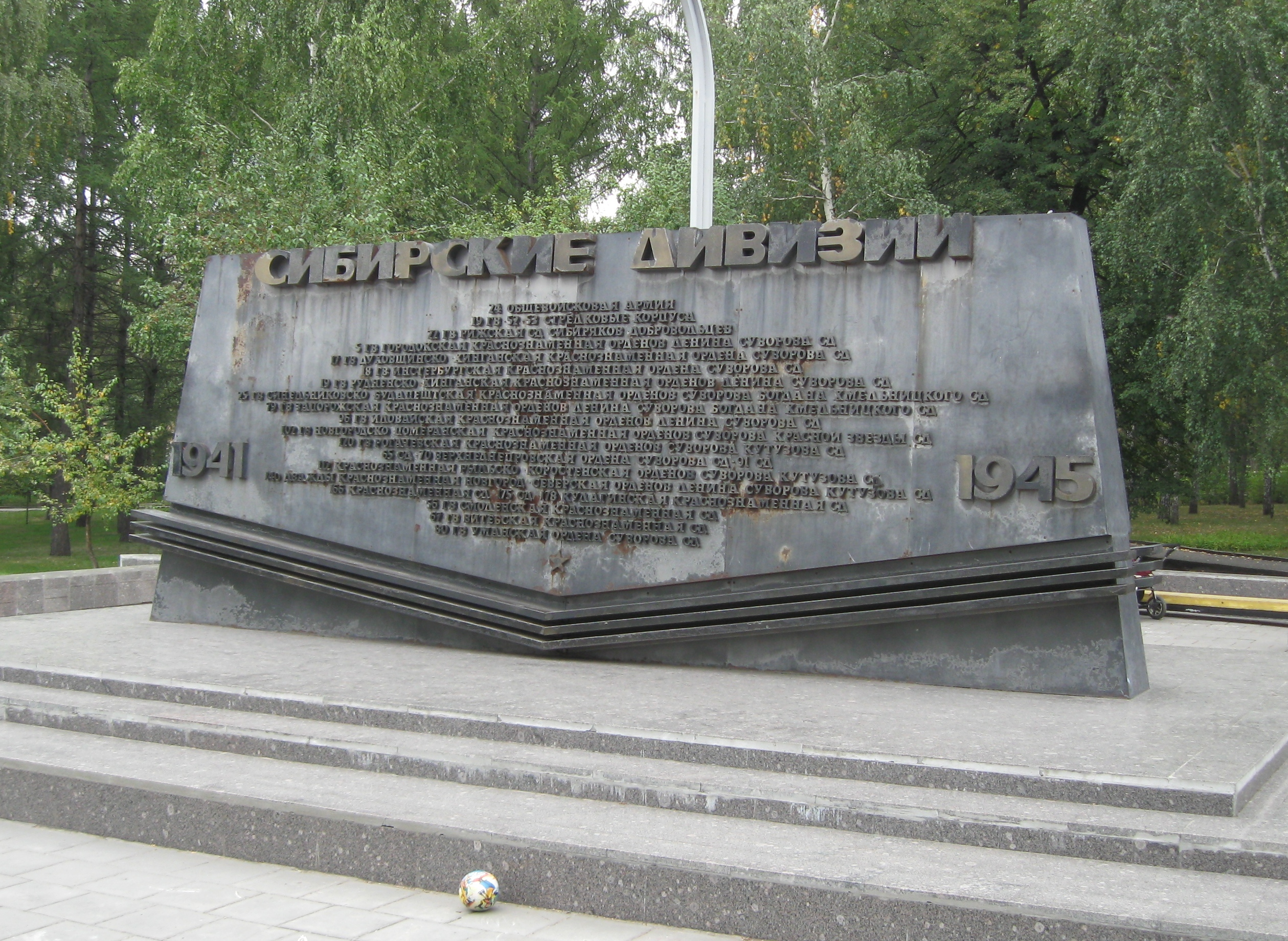
Monument at Novosibirsk to the Siberian Divisions, including the 4th formation of the 140th

During September and October the division took part in the East Carpathian offensive, particularly in the area of the Dukla Pass. During this time it was under 67th Rifle Corps, and then 52nd Rifle Corps, before returning to 101st Corps before the end of the year. In November, 38th Army was transferred to 4th Ukrainian Front.

Fighting died down until the start of the Western Carpathian offensive on January 12, 1945, which coincided with the wider Vistula–Oder offensive. The Front commander, Army Gen. I. Ye. Petrov, planned to attack with part of his forces toward Kraków to the northwest, which would assist 1st Ukrainian Front in taking this place, Meanwhile, 38th Army would break through the defense on a 6km-wide sector south of Jasło before advancing in the direction of Nowy Sącz and Krakow. For the breakthrough, which was set for January 15, the number of guns and mortars was brought up to 180-190 tubes per kilometre of front.

38th Army attacked following a heavy artillery and airstrike preparation with the 101st and 67th Corps and by the end of the first day had broken through the XI SS Army Corps and began advancing westward, threatening to encircle German 17th Army. By January 18 the Soviet forces had advanced 50-60km in cooperation with 60th Army of 1st Ukrainian Front. However, elements of 101st Corps had been left behind to clear stubborn German resistance in the utterly devastated town of Jasło. During this operation the 140th's commander, General Kiselyov, was killed in a surprise German airstrike on January 24, while successfully directing the penetration of the strong German lines south of the town. He was buried at Lviv and was awarded the Gold Star of the Hero of the Soviet Union, posthumously, on May 23, 1945. Col. Ivan Fyodorovich Koslov held command for a week until Col. Mikhail Markovich Vlasov took command of the division on January 31; he had been named as a Hero of the Soviet Union in October 1943, while leading the 106th Rifle Division across the Dniepr, and would hold this command for the duration.

=== Moravia–Ostrava Offensive ===
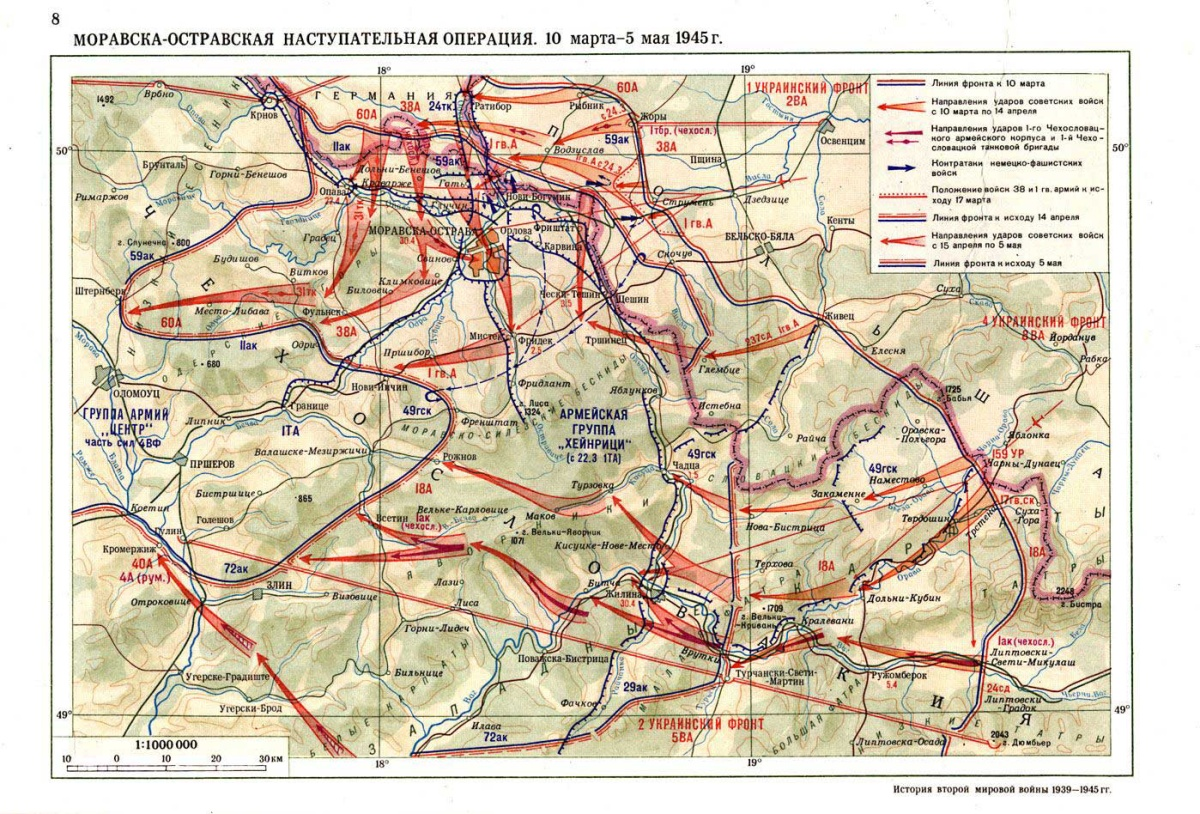
Moravia-Ostrava Offensive. Note positions of 38th Army.

The advance soon continued into Slovakia. The Moravia–Ostrava offensive began on March 10, but in the first eight days of fighting 38th Army was unable to completely penetrate the German defense. During the last half of March the Army again cooperated with 60th Army in encircling and destroying the German grouping defending east and southeast of Ratibor. This was in conjunction with a renewal of the offensive on March 22, with part of the 38th, including 101st Corps, advancing on Opava. This effort proved more successful, although Opava was not finally taken until April 22. In the aftermath, on May 28 all three of the 140th's rifle regiments would be awarded the Order of Suvorov, 3rd Degree, for this battle. The division as a whole had already been decorated with the same order in 2nd Degree on April 5 for the fighting for Bielsko.

The city of Ostrava fell on April 30, and the 140th spent the last week of the war marching with the rest of 38th Army in the direction of Olomouc. On June 4 the 87th Sapper Battalion would receive the Order of Kutuzov, 3rd Degree, for its part in taking this city.

== Postwar ==
At the end of the war, the 140th was near Prague. In two final round of honors, on May 28 the following decorations were presented for the capture of Ostrava and Žilina:

- 96th Rifle Regiment - Order of Alexander Nevsky
- 258th Rifle Regiment - Order of Kutuzov, 3rd Degree
- 283rd Rifle Regiment - Order of Bogdan Khmelnitsky, 2nd Degree
- 92nd Antitank Battalion - Order of Bogdan Khmelnitsky, 3rd Degree
- 596th Signal Battalion - Order of Bogdan Khmelnitsky, 3rd Degree

And on June 4 the division as a whole received the Order of Kutuzov, 2nd Degree, for the capture of Bohumín, Skoczów, Čadca, and other towns in Poland and Czechoslovakia. The men and women of the division now carried the full title of 140th Rifle, Siberian, Novgorod-Severski, Order of Lenin, twice Order of the Red Banner, Orders of Suvorov and Kutuzov Division. (Russian: Сибирская Новгород-Северская ордена Ленина, дважды Краснознамённая, орденов Суворова и Кутузова дивизия.)

The 38th Army was moved back to the USSR, into the short-lived Lvov Military District, by 1946, and the 101st Rifle Corps headquarters was established at Kolomyia. 140th Rifle Division is listed soon after the war as Military Unit No. (V/Ch) 28278 with headquarters located at Kalush. The division and its parent corps were both disbanded in the same year.
