= Signal Battalion (Lithuania) =

- Ryšių batalionas
- Active: 1927–1940
- Country: Lithuania
- Branch: Lithuanian Army
- Type: Military communications
- Size: Battalion

Commanders
- First commander: K. Voicechauskas
- Second commander: M. Vitkūnas‑Vitkauskas
- Third commander: J. Šepetys

The Signal Battalion (Lithuanian: Ryšių batalionas) was a Lithuanian army unit in 1927–40.

== History ==
=== Creation ===
The Signal Battalion was established in September 1927 in Šančiai, Kaunas, in place of the disbanded Technical Regiment (Lithuanian: Technikos pulkas). The battalion carried out the tasks and functions of the previously existing Electo-technical (Lithuanian: Elektrotechnikos batalionas) and Technical (Lithuanian: Technikos batalionas) battalions.

=== Purpose ===
It maintained the military telephone network, communication during army training, trained liaison officers for the signal battalion itself as well as the whole Lithuanian army. The communications battalion was directly subordinated to the headquarters of the military technical units (Lithuanian: Karo technikos dalių štabas).

The organizational structure of the Lithuanian army's infantry divisions also included signal battalions, but not as large in size as the army-level signal battalion. It was planned that during a war, the divisional signal battalion would consist of 426 soldiers. Such numbers meant that these battalions were to be half the size of the divisional battalion-level engineer or cavalry units. The infantry division's signal battalion consisted of a headquarters, a radio company, and a telephone-telegraph company.

=== Composition ===
The signal battalion consisted of headquarters, agricultural, technical, sanitary and veterinary departments, radio and telephone-telegraph companies. The battalion owned the Army's Central Pigeon station (Lithuanian: Centrinis kariuomenės karvelynas) and the Signal Dog School (Lithuanian: Ryšių šunų mokykla).

In January 1938, there were 28 officers, 455 soldiers and 31 civil servants in the battalion, while the battalion had 57 horses. By 1940, this had grown to 590 soldiers.

=== Soviet occupation in 1940 ===
In June 1940, after the Soviet occupation of Lithuania, the battalion was reorganized into the Signal Battalion of the Red Army's 29th Territorial Rifle Corps, while some soldiers were transferred to the communications battalions of the 179th and 184th Rifle Divisions.

=== Equipment ===
The battalion had 2 German radio stations UFI 75, 2 French field radio stations E.R. 400 (French: Emetteur-Récepteur), British-made and Lithuanian portable radio stations RK 1, radio direction finding receivers Telefunken and other equipment.

=== Commanders ===
The battalion's commanders were K. Voicechauskas, M. Vitkūnas‑Vitkauskas, J. Šepetys.

== Sources ==
- Vaičenonis, Jonas (2011-12-08). "Ryšių batalionas". vle.lt (in Lithuanian).
- Vasiliauskas, Edvardas (2022-10-02). "Lietuvos kariuomenės lygmens ryšių vienetai 1935–1940 m." Karo Archyvas (in Lithuanian). 37 (1): 91–157. doi:10.47459/ka.2022.37.3. ISSN 1392-6489. S2CID 252706075.
