= Dolgorukov (disambiguation) =

Dolgorukov, Dolgorukova may refer to:

- House of Dolgorukov, the Dolgorukov family and its members, descendants of Mikhail of Chernigov
- Yuri Dolgoruki, a 12th-century semi-legendary Rurikid prince
- Dolgorukov District, a district (rayon) of Lipetsk Oblast

== See also ==
- Dolgorukovo (disambiguation), for a number of villages named "Dolgorukovo"
- Russian submarine Yury Dolgorukiy
