= Dolgorukovo =

Dolgorukovo (Russian: Долгоруково) is the name of several rural localities in Russia:

- Dolgorukovo, Kaliningrad Oblast, a settlement in Dolgorukovsky Rural Okrug of Bagrationovsky District of Kaliningrad Oblast
- Dolgorukovo, Lipetsk Oblast, a selo in Dolgorukovsky Selsoviet of Dolgorukovsky District of Lipetsk Oblast
- Dolgorukovo, Issinsky District, Penza Oblast, a selo in Bulychevsky Selsoviet of Issinsky District of Penza Oblast
- Dolgorukovo, Mokshansky District, Penza Oblast, a selo in Chernozersky Selsoviet of Mokshansky District of Penza Oblast
- Dolgorukovo, Serdobsky District, Penza Oblast, a selo in Dolgorukovsky Selsoviet of Serdobsky District of Penza Oblast
- Dolgorukovo, Samara Oblast, a village in Klyavlinsky District of Samara Oblast
- Dolgorukovo, Yaroslavl Oblast, a village in Uritsky Rural Okrug of Pervomaysky District of Yaroslavl Oblast
