= 268th Division =

268th Division may refer to:

- 268th Infantry Division, Wehrmacht, Germany
- 268th Rifle Division, Soviet Union

== See also ==
- List of military divisions by number
