= 291st Division =

291st Division may refer to:

- 291st Infantry Division, Wehrmacht, Germany
- 291st Rifle Division, Soviet Union

== See also ==
- List of military divisions by number
