= Mikhail Yenshin =

Mikhail Alexandrovich Yenshin
- Born: 3 December 1900; Smolensk, Russian Empire
- Died: 6 February 1984 (aged 83) Moscow, Soviet Union
- Buried: Kuntsevo Cemetery
- Allegiance: Russian SFSR; Soviet Union
- Branch: Red Guards; Red Army (later Soviet Army); OGPU (later NKVD) Border Troops; Soviet Airborne Troops
- Service years: 1917–1918; 1918–1922; 1923–1958
- Rank: Lieutenant general
- Commands: 268th Rifle Division; 291st Rifle Division; 140th Rifle Division; 307th Rifle Division; 29th Rifle Corps; 362nd Rifle Division; 265th Rifle Division; 99th Guards Airborne Division; 76th Guards Airborne Division; 8th Guards Airborne Corps
- Conflicts: Russian Civil War; Polish–Soviet War; World War II
- Awards: Hero of the Soviet Union; Order of Lenin (2); Order of the Red Banner (7); Order of Suvorov, 2nd class; Order of Kutuzov, 2nd class

Mikhail Alexandrovich Yenshin (Russian: Михаил Александрович Еншин; 3 December 1900 – 6 February 1984) was a Soviet Army lieutenant general and a Hero of the Soviet Union.

Yenshin joined the Red Guards in late 1917 and was among those absorbed into the Red Army upon the creation of the latter, serving as a sapper during the Polish–Soviet War after a brief period in reserve. After another transfer to the reserve in 1922, he was drafted into the Red Army and sent to the Border Troops, rising to command a border detachment by the end of the 1930s. Seconded to the army during the Winter War and decorated for his actions, Yenshin graduated from an NKVD school and taught at the latter until the beginning of Operation Barbarossa.

After commanding the 268th and 291st Rifle Divisions in the Siege of Leningrad, Yenshin briefly led the 140th Rifle Division in early 1943 but was wounded and evacuated to a hospital. After recovery, he took command of the 307th Rifle Division just before it fought in the Battle of Kursk, leading it until June 1944 with a brief temporary corps command. Transferred to command the 362nd Rifle Division after he summarily executed one of his subordinate officers, Yenshin led the 362nd for the rest of the war and was made a Hero of the Soviet Union for his leadership of the division during the Vistula–Oder Offensive in January 1945. Postwar, he commanded a succession of divisions and a corps, finishing his career in 1958 as head of the combat training department of the Soviet Airborne Troops.

== Early life and Russian Civil War ==
Yenshin was born in Smolensk on 3 December 1900, the son of a surveyor, and studied at the Smolensk Gymnasium until 1917. He joined the Smolensk Red Guards Cavalry Detachment of the Smolensk Council of Deputies (Soviet) as an ordinary soldier on 13 December 1917, and from the creation of the Red Army in February 1918 served with the 1st Soviet Iron Cavalry Regiment during the Russian Civil War. In reserve from August 1918, Yenshin became a member of the Shatilov commune in Smolensk Governorate. He became a student at the Military Technical School of the Western Front in Smolensk during October 1919, and upon graduation in 1920 he became a sapper and then sapper platoon commander in the 5th Road and Sapper Detachment of the 15th Army of the front, fighting in the Polish–Soviet War.

== Interwar period ==
Yenshin served as a draftsman and captain for arms with the 23rd Rifle Division in Kharkov from February 1922, before being transferred to the reserve in December of that year. In June 1923 he was drafted into the Red Army and sent to the border troops. Yenshin served with the Sebezh Special OGPU Border Detachment as a junior supervisor at a checkpoint and as an assistant official for anti-smuggling duty. He transferred to the 11th OGPU Border Detachment in February 1925 to serve in the latter position, and from March served as an official for political protection with the 10th Ostrov and 9th Pskov OGPU Border Detachments.

Yenshin was sent to Central Asia as the commandant of border sector No. 45, part of the Merv Border Detachment and from August 1931 served in the same position for border sector No. 48 of the Saray Komar Border Detachment. He transferred to the 47th Kerki NKVD Border Detachment in May 1932 to serve as assistant chief for secret operational units, simultaneously serving as assistant head of the district department of the Central Asian Border District. In Central Asia Yenshin participated in the suppression of the bands of Gapan-Yak-Mamed and Basmachi in Khalach and Khodzhambas Districts of the Turkmen Soviet Socialist Republic.

Yenshin transferred in May 1935 to become head of the 1st Kalevala NKVD Border Detachment at Ukhta before becoming head of the 37th NKVD Border Detachment at Batumi in December 1937. He studied at the Order of Lenin Higher NKVD School in Moscow from October 1939, but was seconded to the Northwestern Front in December, with which he fought in the Winter War as commander of the 2nd Border Regiment of the 9th Army in the Kandalaksha sector. For his "courage in battle", Yenshin received the Order of the Red Banner on 26 April 1940. After the end of the war he returned to the Higher NKVD School, and upon graduation in January 1941 became a military instructor at the academy.

== World War II ==
After the beginning of Operation Barbarossa, the German invasion of the Soviet Union, Yenshin was appointed commander of the 268th Rifle Division in July with the rank of major general. The latter was formed as part of the Moscow Military District in Zagorsk from border guards. By 3 August, it was sent to Estonia, joining the 8th Army of the Northern Front. From 9 August it fought in the Rakvere area, then retreated towards Oranienbaum. Relocated to Leningrad between 17 and 19 September, the 268th became part of the 55th Army of the Leningrad Front on 29 September and fought in defensive actions in the area of Sapernoy and on the Tosna. Transferred to command the 291st Rifle Division on the Karelian Isthmus in October, Yenshin led the division as part of the 23rd Army for the rest of 1941 and most of 1942 in the holding of defensive actions near Beloostrov to the northwest of Leningrad. 23rd Army commander Major General Aleksandr Cherepanov noted that Yenshin's "daily monitoring and control of the combat activities" of the 291st "significantly increased" the readiness of the division, but due to a long period with the border troops Yenshin had "insufficient practical experience and tactical knowledge in commanding the division".

By a Stavka directive, Yenshin was placed at the disposal of the NKVD on 23 October and sent to the Siberian Military District to command the Siberian Rifle Division of the NKVD, formed at Novosibirsk as part of the Army of NKVD Troops. The Siberian Rifle Division was redesignated as the 140th Siberian Rifle Division during February 1943 while the army became the 70th Army. With the army, the division was transferred to Yelets between 8 and 15 February, and within twenty days of its arrival the 140th made a 450-kilometer march to concentrate near Khorlanovo and Trofimovka under winter conditions. The division fought in the Dmitriyev-Sevsk Offensive from 8 March as part of the Central Front. Seriously wounded in both legs on 17 March, Yenshin was evacuated to a hospital in Kursk and then the Central NKVD Troops Hospital in Moscow, where he was treated until June.

Upon his recovery, Yenshin was appointed commander of the 307th Rifle Division, leading it during the Battle of Kursk, in which the 307th fought as part of the 13th Army of the Central Front from 5 July, repulsing six days of German attacks in the Ponyri sector. The division was withdrawn to the front reserve on 11 July and from 26 July, as part of the 70th and then 48th Armies, fought in Operation Kutuzov and the Chernigov-Pripyat Offensive, during which it crossed the Nerussa, Sev, Desna, and Snov and recaptured Novozybkov, for which it received the name of the town as an honorific. 42nd Rifle Corps commander Major General Konstantin Kolganov described Yenshin's "skilled and firm leadership" of the division as integral to the crossing of the Desna by improvised rafts under German fire and its capture of Novozybkov. Continuing the offensive, the division crossed the Sozh River and for ten days fought to expand its bridgehead. Crossing the Dnieper on 20 October, the 307th fought in the Gomel–Rechitsa Offensive. For the breakthrough of German lines south of Gomel and the recapture of Rechitsa during the latter, Yenshin received the Order of Kutuzov, 2nd class, on 15 January 1944.

Yenshin temporarily commanded the 29th Rifle Corps of the 48th Army of the Belorussian Front, fighting in defensive actions near Zhlobin, then on 31 December returned to command of the 307th, which he led in heavy fighting in eastern Belarus as part of the 48th and then the 50th Army from 18 March. During the unsuccessful fighting in eastern Belarus, on 26 February, Yenshin personally summarily executed the chief of artillery of his division's 1019th Rifle Regiment, Captain Ivan Barankov, at the divisional command post, after Barankov reported to him that Yenshin's orders had not been fulfilled, the artillery guns having fallen through the ice of the Berezina. The incident was concealed and Yenshin only received a disciplinary sanction. The 307th was withdrawn to the second echelon of the army on 29 April, and on 26 June Yenshin transferred to command the 362nd Rifle Division, which he led for the rest of the war. The transfer was requested by the commander of the 50th Army, who believed that the execution of Barankov by Yenshin undermined the authority of the latter with the 307th. Initially part of the 50th Army, the 362nd fought as part of the 33rd Army as part of the 2nd, 3rd, and then 1st Belorussian Fronts from July. Yenshin led the division in the Minsk and Kaunas Offensives during Operation Bagration, during which it recaptured Shklov, Bykhov, Prienai, and Marijampolė. The 362nd suffered heavy losses during the repulse of German counterattacks at Kybartai between mid-August and 9 September and was withdrawn to the reserve. During October, the division was relocated to Poland and concentrated near Białystok and in December transferred to the Puławy bridgehead.

Yenshin led the 362nd during the Vistula–Oder Offensive in January 1945, participating in the capture of Radom and the pursuit of German forces to the Oder. The division approached the Oder on 1 February and three days later crossed it and captured a bridgehead with minimal loss. It spent February and March fighting to hold the latter, and Yenshin was made a Hero of the Soviet Union and awarded the Order of Lenin on 6 April 1945 in recognition of his leadership. The division fought in the Berlin Offensive from 16 April, fighting in the Müllrose area southwest of Frankfurt-an-der-Oder, the crossing of the Oder–Spree Canal, the offensive in the Fürstenwalde region (southeast and south of Berlin), battles in the Kertse area, and the advance to the Elbe. It ended the war near Stonau and Dessau. By the end of the war, his superiors assessed Yenshin as having "quickly understood situations, making decisions correctly and executing them firmly, and making effective use of attached support and organizing their cooperation with the infantry".

== Postwar ==
Postwar, Yenshin served as head of the commandant's office of Mecklenburg-Vorpommern in Schwerin from July. He transferred to command the 265th Rifle Division of the Group of Soviet Occupation Forces in Germany in October, and continued in this position when the 265th was withdrawn to the Moscow Military District and reduced to the 34th Separate Rifle Brigade in June 1946. Commanding the 99th Guards Airborne Division of the 37th Guards Airborne Corps from July, he entered the Rifle Division Commanders' Improvement Courses at the Frunze Military Academy in February 1949, and upon completion a year later Yenshin took command of the 76th Guards Airborne Division. He graduated from the correspondence department of the Frunze Academy in 1953, and from September of the later year served as commander of the 8th Guards Airborne Corps, being promoted to lieutenant general in 1955. Yenshin served as assistant commander and head of the combat training department of the Soviet Airborne Troops from August 1956, his last post before retirement on 2 December 1958. He lived in Moscow and died there on 6 February 1984, being buried at Kuntsevo Cemetery.

== Awards and honors ==
Yenshin received the following awards and decorations:

- Hero of the Soviet Union
- Order of Lenin (2)
- Order of the Red Banner (7)
- Order of Suvorov, 2nd class
- Order of Kutuzov, 2nd class
- Medals

He was a delegate to the Supreme Soviet of the Adjar Autonomous Soviet Socialist Republic in 1938.
