= Ivan Kopyak =

Russian major general (1897–1942)

Ivan Andreyevich Kopyak
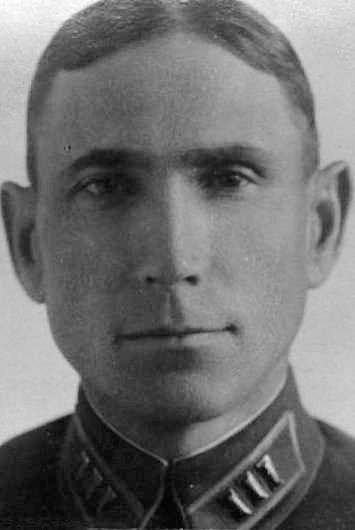
- Kopyak's picture from his service records, c. 1940
- Born: 26 August 1897; Glubokaya Balka, Poltava Governorate, Russian Empire
- Died: July 1942 (aged 44) Rostov Oblast, Soviet Union
- Allegiance: Russian Empire; Soviet Union
- Branch: Imperial Russian Army; Red Army
- Service years: 1916–1917; 1918–1942
- Rank: Major general
- Commands: 112th Rifle Division; 140th Rifle Division
- Conflicts: World War I; Russian Civil War; World War II
- Awards: Order of the Red Banner

Ivan Andreyevich Kopyak (Russian: Иван Андреевич Копяк; 26 August 1897 – July 1942) was a Red Army major general who held division command during World War II.

A veteran of World War I, Kopyak rose to regimental command by the end of the Russian Civil War. He took command of the 112th Rifle Division in the first days after Operation Barbarossa began and led it during the Battle of Smolensk. Kopyak led the division in its breakout from encirclement and in late 1941 took command of the 140th Rifle Division. The division suffered heavy losses defending against Case Blue in mid-1942, during which Kopyak was presumed killed.

== Early life, World War I and Russian Civil War ==
A Ukrainian, Ivan Andreyevich Kopyak was born on 26 August 1897 in the village of Glubokaya Balka, Poltavsky Uyezd, Poltava Governorate. During World War I, Kopyak was conscripted into the Imperial Russian Army on 15 May 1916 and sent to the 235th Reserve Regiment at Azov. In June he was dispatched to the Western Front with a march company, where he fought in the region of Brody in Galicia with the 402nd Ust-Medveditsa Infantry Regiment of the 101st Infantry Division of the 32nd Army Corps. Kopyak graduated from the regimental training detachment in 1917, reaching the rank of feldfebel. Demobilized at the end of December, he joined the 1st Kiev Red Guard Detachment in January 1918 while returning home through Kiev and served with it for thirteen days until German troops occupied the city, after which he continued to his home village.

During the Russian Civil War, Kopyak joined the Red Army on 23 February 1918 and was sent to the 1st Poltava Soviet Infantry Regiment of the 3rd Ukrainian Soviet Army of the Southern Front. With this unit, he commanded a platoon and company, fighting with German troops and the Ukrainian People's Army in the regions of Poltava, Kharkov, Lyubotin, Zhuravka, Rossosh and Voronezh. Kopyak and the regiment were transferred to the Eastern Front in mid-June, where the regiment was redesignated the 251st Rifle Regiment and assigned to the 28th Rifle Division of the 2nd Army. With the regiment, Kopyak served as an assistant company commander, company commander, battalion commander, regimental commander and assistant regimental commander. He took part in battles with the Czechoslovaks and Whites near Kazan. In January 1919 he was wounded in action and evacuated to a hospital. In summer 1919 the division was relocated west to Tsaritsyn, where it fought against the White Armed Forces of South Russia as part of the 10th Army. For distinguishing himself in combat, Kopyak was awarded the Order of the Red Banner on 6 May. In August he was sent to the Vystrel course, and returned to his regiment after graduation in February 1920. From April the division fought on the Caucasian Front with the 11th Army on the axis of Baku, Yelizavetpol, Agdam, Shusha, and Nakhichevan. During these operations Kopyak served as an assistant regimental commander, regimental commander, and acting brigade commander. He was wounded on 6 November and evacuated to a hospital.

== Interwar period ==
After the end of the Russian Civil War, Kopyak was sent to the Kiev Military District headquarters in June 1921, where he was appointed commander of the 492nd Rifle Regiment of the 164th Separate Rifle Brigade in Nezhin. The brigade was disbanded in August, and Kopyak sent to the 24th Rifle Division as a battalion commander in the 216th Rifle Regiment at Gaisin. From September 1922 he commanded the 14th Separate Border Battalion of the 2nd Podolsk Border Division of the Ukrainian Military District, and then was assistant commander of the 11th Separate Battalion of the division in the region of Mogilev-Podolsky. In June 1923 Kopyak was sent to the North Caucasus where he became chief of the Pyatigorsk Convoy Detachment of the Convoy Guard Troops of the OGPU. From February 1925 he commanded the 6th and 14th Separate Battalions of the Convoy Guard Troops at Krasnodar and Rostov-on-Don. From November 1927 to August 1928 Kopyak completed the Vystrel course again, after which he commanded the 2nd and 9th Separate Battalions of the Convoy Guard Troops at Dnepropetrovsk and Zhitomir.

Kopyak returned to the Red Army in April 1931 as assistant commander of the 142nd Rifle Regiment of the 48th Rifle Division at Rzhev. In January 1932 he transferred to Tomsk where he served as chief of the supply service of the 78th Rifle Division, and from November commanded the 232nd Rifle Regiment of the division. In August 1933 Kopyak was appointed chief of the provisions section of the Supply Department of the Primorsky Group of Forces of the Special Red Banner Far Eastern Army. Kopyak continued to serve in the Soviet Far East as chief of the Combat Training Department of the Primorsky Oblast Osoaviakhim Council at Vladivostok from December 1934, and in May 1935 transferred to serve as chief of the Vladivostok Reserve Command Personnel Improvement Courses. From February 1940 he was deputy commander of the 39th Rifle Division of the 1st Red Banner Army of the Far Eastern Front. In March 1941 Kopyak was appointed commander of the 203rd Rifle Division of the Ural Military District. In early June the division was sent to the Baltic Special Military District to form the 5th Airborne Corps, and then-Colonel Kopyak appointed commander of the 112th Rifle Division of the 22nd Army's 51st Rifle Corps.

== World War II ==
=== Kraslava ===
While Kopyak was en route, Germany invaded the Soviet Union on 22 June. The 112th had also been sent west from the Ural Military District, and when Kopyak took command on 27 June its units were defending positions near Krāslava. On the morning of 1 July German units began attacking the 112th near Kraslava, and were repulsed in fighting that raged for most of the day. The 112th suffered significant casualties, and Kopyak had to commit a battalion to strengthen his right.

By the morning of 2 July, Kopyak had brought up to Kraslava six of his nine rifle battalions and two of three divisional artillery battalions. His remaining forces were defending the line up to the city of Drissa. The German units resumed the attack that morning, but the defenses of the 112th managed to hold again. However, Dmitry Lelyushenko's 21st Mechanized Corps defending to the 112th's right began retreating to the northwest, exposing Kopyak's flank. Lelyushenko failed to inform Kopyak and it was not until 18:00 that day that the 112th's command found out. Kopyak realized the danger and ordered a retreat. In an hour the regiments began to draw off their troops to a new line east of Kraslava, abandoning the city by midnight.

Army commander Filipp Yershakov ordered the 112th to retreat further but the division did not receive the order. The fighting continued on 3 July and by the evening the dwindling forces of the 112th were no longer able to hold the line. Its defenses broken, the division retreated to the northeast towards the Sarjanka river under the over of darkness.

=== Nevel pocket ===
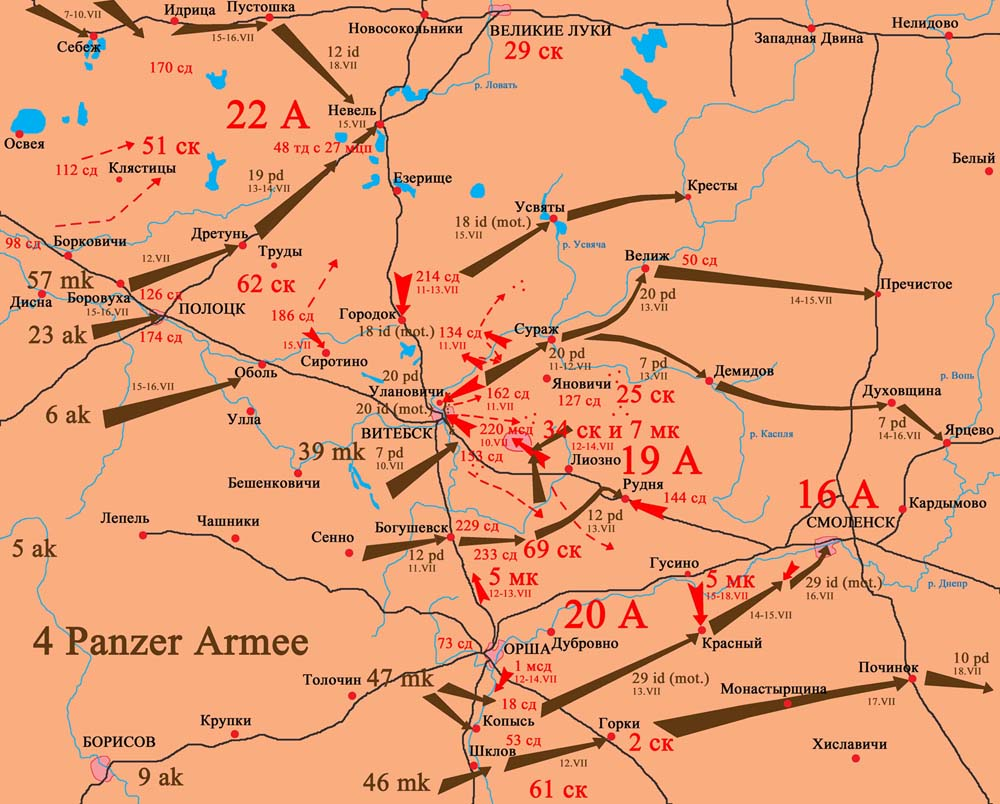
Battle of Smolensk, 10 to 18 July

Reestablishing defenses on the Sarjanka, the division came under infantry attack again on 7 July. Later that day, Kopyak concluded that the German concentration at the mouth of the Sarjanka was the main threat to the defense, and that night he reinforced the regiment defending there with two more battalions. However, the German attack on 8 July came against the 416th Regiment on the division's right, at Lake Osveya. The attack drove a wedge into the Soviet positions and threatened the rear of the division. To remedy the situation, Kopyak went to the area of the fighting and threw two battalions into a counterattack, which halted the German advance at the cost of significant casualties. The right remained the most threatened sector of the division and Kopyak concentrated almost all of his reserves there.

The division was driven back by tank-supported German attacks on 9 July, having lost 40 percent of its personnel and almost all its equipment and horses. During 11 July the division marched east towards the line of the Nishcha river and Yukhovichi, coming under periodic German air attack while conducting rearguard actions as the Battle of Smolensk began. Kopyak formed mobile detachments of company strength to cover the division's flanks. While the division retreated, the city of Polotsk fell on 15 July, trapping the 51st Rifle Corps in the Nevel pocket. By 16 July the remnants of the division reached the sovkhoz of Repishche, suffering from a lack of ammunition, shells and provisions. The 51st Rifle Corps continued to retreat east on 17 July, cut off from the rest of the 22nd Army. With ammunition, fuel and provisions almost exhausted, corps commander General Akim Markov ordered a breakout.

On the night of 19–20 July Kopyak's 112th attempted to break out through the Pustoshka–Nevel highway northeast of Nevel, but repeated attempts failed with heavy losses. The German troops responded with their own attacks and broke through to the division command post, only being stopped by a hastily organized counterattack. Most of the survivors of the division remained encircled and dispersed into small groups. Late on 21 July, due to the failure of the attempts of the previous two days, Kopyak decided to change the direction of the breakout attack to the south, towards Pogrebishche. He ordered the destruction of heavy equipment, with the soldiers left with only what they could carry out themselves and artillery that could be drawn by horses. However, Markov countermanded Kopyak's change of plans and the 112th had to regroup in the dark after it had already begun movement, creating confusion and noise that attracted German artillery fire. The remnants of the division took cover in a small forest, and a general attack by the remaining combat-capable units of the corps commenced hours later. However, this met with a similar lack of success.

Scraping together survivors, Kopyak personally led his soldiers into the attack in the area of the Kuznetsovo forest in the predawn hours of 22 July. In one attack he was wounded and lay in a ditch for several hours, not having the strength to climb to the highway on his own. At night Kopyak managed to get up and returned to his command post in the Kuznetsovo forest. By the morning of 23 July, the encircled units of the 51st Corps had disintegrated and Kopyak and other commanders formed detachments of 200 to 250 men out of soldiers from all three divisions of the corps mixed together. Continuing to attack to the south, the Soviet breakout attempts resumed. Kopyak's detachment reached Soviet lines on 25 July in the region of Lake Dvinye. The remnants of the 112th were consolidated into the 112th Rifle Regiment, having retained their banner.

Kopyak was wounded again in fighting in the region of Sosykino, Kalinin Oblast on 22 August, after which he was treated in a hospital from 2 September to 6 November. Kopyak's reputation as a commander was strengthened by his performance in the Nevel pocket, as 51st Rifle Corps chief of staff Kuzma Sazonov reported that he wasn't "sitting somewhere in a dugout, but was where the fighting was the hottest."

Kopyak took command of the new 140th Rifle Division, forming in the Moscow Military District, on 21 December. He was promoted to major general on 3 May 1942. In May the division was assigned to the 24th Army of the Southern Front. From 8 June it fought as part of the 9th Army, repulsing the German advance in Case Blue in the Donbass and the Great Bend of the Don, during the Voronezh–Voroshilovgrad and Donbass defensive operations. In these intense battles Kopyak's division sustained heavy losses, and he was reported missing, presumed killed, in July. The 140th had only 85 personnel left by late July.

== Decorations ==
Kopyak received the following decorations:

- Order of the Red Banner (1919)
- Jubilee Medal "XX Years of the Workers' and Peasants' Red Army" (1938)
- Order of the Patriotic War, 2nd class (6 May 1965, posthumously)
