= 307th Rifle Division =

307th Rifle Division (July 12, 1941 – December 30, 1945)
- Active: 1941–1945
- Country: Soviet Union
- Branch: Red Army
- Type: Infantry
- Size: Division
- Engagements: Battle of Smolensk; Battle of Moscow; Battle of Kursk; Operation Kutuzov; Battle of the Dniepr; Gomel-Rechitsa Offensive; Operation Bagration; Battle of Königsberg
- Decorations: Order of the Red Banner Order of Suvorov Order of Kutuzov
- Battle honours: Novozybkov

Commanders
- Notable commanders: Col. Vasilii Grigorevich Terentev; Maj. Gen. Georgii Semyonovich Lazko; Maj. Gen. Mikhail Yenshin; Maj. Gen. Vasilii Nikitich Dalmatov

The 307th Rifle Division was raised in 1941 as a standard Red Army rifle division, and served for the duration of the Great Patriotic War in that role. The division distinguished itself in the intense defensive fighting around the village of Ponyri during the Battle of Kursk. It was credited with the liberation of the town of Novozybkov on September 25, 1943. After battling its way through eastern Belarus during the autumn and winter of 1943–44, and then helping complete its liberation during Operation Bagration, it was moved to East Prussia, where it took part in the Battle of Königsberg in the spring of 1945, ending the war on the Baltic coast near the Zemland Peninsula. In the course of these campaigns the 307th compiled a battle record to rival a Guards unit (which it narrowly missed out on) but was nevertheless disbanded on the second-last day of 1945.

== Formation ==
The division began organizing at Ivanovo in the Moscow Military District on July 12, 1941, and was at the front by the middle of the next month. Its order of battle was as follows:

- 1019th Rifle Regiment
- 1021st Rifle Regiment
- 1023rd Rifle Regiment
- 837th Artillery Regiment
- 365th Antitank Battalion
- 580th Sapper Battalion
- 733rd Signal Battalion
- 384th Reconnaissance Company

Col. Vasilii Grigorevich Terentev was the first divisional commander assigned. The 307th was very quickly moved to the front, arriving in 13th Army of Bryansk Front at Starodub by August 15. The division would remain in that Front, apart from one month, until March, 1943, and in that Army until July of the same year. During this entire period the division remained in the same general part of the front, between Voronezh and Tula-Oryol. When it first arrived at the front, the division operated as a separate formation, but by September 1 it had been subordinated to 45th Rifle Corps.

Gen. A.I. Yeryomenko, the Army commander, began ordering counterstrokes on August 27 against German forces of Second Panzer Group that had recently captured Starodub. Over the following weeks the rifle divisions of 13th Army launched numerous attacks with limited armor support against the German flank in what was clearly an uneven contest to try to disrupt the enemy armored drive south to encircle the Red Army forces defending Kiev. In these actions the 45th Rifle Corps made little progress while suffering significant losses, and on September 7 Yeryomenko wrote:

"At that time, the [enemy] units conducting the offensive along the Starodub axis began a meeting engagement with 269th, 282nd, 155th, and 307th Rifle Divisions along the Sudost' River line. Unable to withstand the attack by the motorized corps, these divisions began withdrawing in disorder behind the Desna River, while suffering heavy losses."

13th Army was too far south to be caught up in Operation Typhoon, but instead was gradually pushed eastward during October and November by the south flank forces of Army Group Center until it reached the area of Yelets. On November 5, Colonel Terentev handed command of the division to Col. Grigorii Semyonovich Lazko. After the German advance was halted at Moscow, Marshal S.K. Timoshenko led a counteroffensive by 3rd and 13th Armies against those same forces, driving them westward during December. During 1942 the front in this sector was stable, with both sides committing their major forces elsewhere. This changed in the aftermath of Stalingrad. Soviet formations on the southern half of the front exploited the victory by thrusting westward, and on February 12, 1943, the 307th was pushing northwards from the area of Kursk in the general direction of Oryol, but a week later had been brought to a halt.

As was the case with many other successful Red Army formations during this period, the division was considered for elevation to Guards status, but the following report from the chief of the 13th Army's political department dashed that chance:

"In connection with the proposed award of a guards banner to the 307th Rifle Division... I consider it my duty to report to you that, in my opinion, the state of affairs in the division and the course of its combat operations at present do not provide a sufficient basis for the award of that high status, since, from 13 to 21 February... the division has not fulfilled even one of its assigned missions... The required organization, precision, and vigilance is absent in the division's headquarters, units, and subunits... The division inadequately displays concern about the skillful fulfillment of combat missions... and, as a result... units are suffering excessive personnel losses... The division commander, Comrade Lazko, displays considerable conceit, [excessive] self-confidence, and unnecessary arrogance; he keeps distant from his units and the command cadre, he always "leads" from his office... Military discipline is not at the required level. There have been instances of drunkenness and dissipation among the command cadre... The division's rear services function exceptionally poorly. The soldiers in a number of subunits have not received bread or sugar in several days... They have not changed their underclothing for a long time, many are lice-ridden, and recently 16 instances of typhus were registered. The division commander displays complete indifference to all these outrages and deficiencies." – Major General Popov

Even this scathing report did not prevent Lazko from being promoted to the rank of Major General on February 22. The division would miss out on the distinction of Guard status, but would compile a worthy record nevertheless, beginning with its next battle.

== Battle of Kursk ==
The 307th's February advance came to a halt several kilometres north of the village of Ponyri. During the following months the division fortified its positions, first as a matter of course, then more intensively as Stavka began to expect a German summer offensive against the Kursk salient. Stavka was entirely correct. In March, 13th Army was transferred to Gen K.K. Rokossovsky's Central Front. Just days before the battle began, General Lazko was replaced by Maj. Gen. Mikhail Yenshin, and the division became part of the second echelon of the 29th Rifle Corps. As the battle began on July 5, the 307th strongly contested elements of the German 9th Army, particularly the 9th and 18th Panzer Divisions, both in the village and Hill 253.5 on its outskirts in what was described as the "Stalingrad of the Kursk Salient". Counter-attacks by elements of the division were backed by the 129th Tank Brigade and the 1454th SU Regiment (SU-122s). The highest ground was denied to the Germans by the 1023rd Rifle Regiment. Back-and-forth fighting went on for several days, and while the Soviet forces were not able to immediately retake the village, the German thrust had been stymied far short of its goal, with significant losses, giving the Red Army, and the 307th, the victory, also at a large cost.

== Advance ==
Following the German defeat at Kursk, Central Front began advancing westward out of the salient. On July 21, the 307th was transferred to the 70th Army, and about a month later to the 48th Army, moving to the 42nd Rifle Corps. During the Front's advance westwards towards the Dniepr the division distinguished itself in the liberation of the city of Novozybkov:

"NOVOZYBKOV – Liberated on 25 September 1943 by troops of Central Front in the Bryansk and Chernigov-Pripyat operation... 307th Rifle Division (Maj. Gen. Yenshin, Mikhail Alexsandrovich)... By order of the Supreme High Command is given this name."

=== Battles for Belarus ===
By the start of October, Rokossovski's Front had arrived along the Sozh River, as well as part of the Dniepr south of the Sozh. His next objectives were the cities of Gomel and Rechitsa. The preliminary plan for the offensive called for 65th Army's 19th Rifle Corps to begin an attack against the German XXXV Army Corps' defenses at Gomel on October 7. Following a regrouping, 48th Army's 307th, 102nd and 194th Rifle Divisions would join the offensive as soon as possible, with the other four divisions of the Army to follow. This regrouping transferred the first three divisions into the bridgehead at Loev (the confluence of the Dniepr and the Sozh) between October 8 and 14. Soon after this the 307th was moved to the 42nd Rifle Corps, which was in the first echelon on a 5-kilometre-wide sector between the village of Bushatin and the Dniepr.

The Gomel-Rechitsa Offensive was launched from the Loev bridgehead early on November 10 on a front of 38 km. In three days of fighting the forces of 48th and 65th Armies managed to tear a gap 15-kilometres wide and from 8 – 12-kilometres deep in the German defenses, and were halfway to Rechitsa. By November 16 the 307th had reached as far as Sviridovichi. Over the next four days, 42nd Corps drove XXXV Corps back into Rechitsa, and on November 20 the Germans evacuated the city, crossing to the east bank of the Dniepr under pressure from the rifle Corps and 1st Guards Tank Corps to the north. Army Group Center's southern defenses were in a state of crisis by this point, and Ninth Army had been forced out of Gomel. As the German retreat continued, 42nd Corps also crossed the Dniepr and linked up with the rest of 48th Army.

In December the division was transferred to 29th Rifle Corps, still in 48th Army. In January, Rokossovsky planned another offensive to continue his drive towards Parichi and, in the best case, Bobruisk. Beginning on January 16, 29th and 42nd Corps, along with a corps of 65th Army and backed by two separate tank regiments and the SU-76s of 1897th SU Regiment, were to attack on a 15-kilometre-wide sector from Shatsilki on the Berezina River southwestward to Zherd Station on the Shatsilki – Kalinkovichi rail line. They faced the German 253rd Infantry Division and roughly half of the 36th Infantry Division. On the overall attack sector the Red Army had, with reserves, about a 3 to 1 advantage in infantry, but was weak in armor. The 307th was on the right of its Corps, east of Shatsilki. From the outset, the two Rifle Corps struggled to penetrate the German forward defenses. After six days of intense fighting, 48th Army's shock group managed to advance between five and ten kilometres on a front of roughly 20 km. Shatsilki fell to the 217th Rifle Division on January 21, and the rest of 29th Corps was regrouped and ordered to attack northward toward Chirkovichi and Molcha, 8–13 km northwest of Shatsilki, beginning on January 24.

This renewed attack caught the Germans off-balance as they were preparing new defenses. In four more days of heavy fighting the 307th captured the German strongpoint at Repishche. Then, with flank support from the 73rd and 137th Rifle Divisions, it forced the 253rd Infantry to retreat with most of its remaining forces to the Chirka River. By day's end on January 27 the most advanced elements of 48th Army were just 15 km from the outskirts of Parichi. But this had come at a cost, and Rokossovsky called a temporary halt on that date, with the offensive to resume on February 2. The new effort made only limited gains in four days of combat, and another halt was called on February 6. On those last two days the division took in 1,500 infantry replacements from the Far East. Shortly thereafter the 307th was shifted to 25th Rifle Corps, which was holding the line along the Berezina. On February 24, following a short but intense artillery preparation, 25th Corps launched an attack across the river. The division was in the center on the Iashchitsy sector and almost immediately ran into enemy strongpoints at Dubrova and Antonovka which were only overcome after three days of hard fighting; the flanking divisions faced the same sort of difficulties. Early on the 26th the battle was reinforced by two divisions of 53rd Rifle Corps, specifically by 41st Rifle Division on the 307th's sector, and by the next day the strongpoints were taken and the German 45th Infantry Division was falling back to an intermediate line 4 – 10 km to the rear. The 307th pursued towards Korotkovichi but bogged down there in the new German defenses. This offensive was halted on February 29 after an advance of from 2 – 18 km on a 20 km front. This marked the end of Rokossovsky's winter offensives.

In March the division was transferred to the 19th Rifle Corps of 50th Army, still in the 1st Belorussian Front, but in April the 50th Army was itself transferred to 2nd Belorussian Front in the buildup to Operation Bagration. From April until July the division was not assigned to any corps. On the third day of Bagration, Maj. Gen. Vasilii Nikitich Dalmatov took command of the division from General Yenshin, and would remain in that post for the duration of the war; at the same time, Yenshin took over Dalmatov's 362nd Rifle Division. On July 9 the 307th was released to 49th Army from Front reserve. It was tasked, along with 38th Rifle Corps and five other separate rifle divisions, plus three NKVD border regiments, to methodically comb through the forested areas east of Minsk with light air support. This was a search and destroy mission against enemy groups that had not yet surrendered. This operation ended on July 13, after which the division returned to 50th Army. The 307th would remain in 50th Army for the duration, for most of that time in the 81st Rifle Corps. On September 1 the division was recognized for its role in the Osovets Offensive with the award of the Order of Suvorov, 2nd Class.

== Into Germany ==
In February, 1945, 50th Army was shifted to 3rd Belorussian Front as the war was grinding to a halt in East Prussia. The division would take part in the Siege of Königsberg, and would later join the Zemland Group of Forces, clearing the remaining German elements from the Baltic coast. On April 5, the day before the final battle for the city began, the division was awarded the Order of the Red Banner for the capture of Biała Piska and other nearby towns, and its general record of service. On the same day, it was also awarded the Order of Kutuzov, 2nd degree, for its role in the capture of Wormditt, Melzak, and the surrounding area. When the war ended, the men and women of the division carried a title to rival most Guards divisions: 307th Rifle, Novozybkov, Order of the Red Banner, Order of Suvorov, Order of Kutuzov Division. (Russian: 307-я стрелковая Новозыбковская Краснознамённая орденов Суворова и Кутузова дивизия.)

== Postwar ==
The division was moved to the Kiev Military District, where the corps disbanded on December 30, 1945. The division was disbanded either before or around that date.
