= 291st Rifle Division =

- 291-я стрелковая дивизия
- Active: 12 July 1941 - 11 May 1945
- Country: Soviet Union
- Branch: Red Army
- Type: Infantry
- Role: Rifle Division
- Engagements: Second World War: Eastern Front; Siege of Leningrad; Leningrad–Novgorod Offensive; Baltic Offensive; Prague Offensive
- Decorations: Order of the Red Banner; Order of Kutuzov 2nd Class
- Battle honours: Gatchina

Commanders
- Notable commanders: Major-General Mikhail Yenshin (25 October 1941 - 1 November 1942)

The 291st Rifle Division (Russian: 291-я стрелковая дивизия) was an infantry division of the Soviet Union's Red Army during World War II. Formed in the summer of 1941, the 290th fought in the siege of Leningrad until its end in January 1944, and then in the Baltic states, Poland, Germany, and Czechoslovakia before being disbanded after the end of the war in the summer of 1945.

== History ==
The 291st was formed in early July 1941 as the 11th Moscow Militia Division, which soon received a regular Red Army cadre and on 12 July became the 291st Rifle Division. Its basic order of battle included the 181st, 309th, and 1025th Rifle Regiments, as well as the 838th Artillery Regiment. Less than a month after its formation, the division was sent to Leningrad, and by 17 August was part of the city's Krasnogvardeysk fortified sector. At the beginning of September, the division was transferred to the 23rd Army, holding positions against Finnish attack north of the city. The division served with the 23rd Army until March 1943, when it transferred to the 55th Army of the Leningrad Front. In January 1944, when the Leningrad–Novgorod Offensive, which ended the siege, began, the division was part of the 67th Army. At the time, the average rifle company in the division had about 70 men, half of authorized strength.

In April 1944 the 67th Army was transferred to the 3rd Baltic Front, and the division became part of the army's 116th Rifle Corps. In September the division was withdrawn to the Reserve of the Supreme High Command where it remained for over three months. Returning to the front in December, the 291st became part of the 1st Ukrainian Front's 21st Army. The division fought in Poland, Germany, and northern Czechoslovakia for the rest of the war. The division was disbanded in the summer of 1945 with the Central Group of Forces.
