= 179th Rifle Division =

- Active: 1940–1948 (1st formation); 1953–1955 (2nd formation)
- Country: Soviet Union
- Branch: Red Army
- Type: Infantry
- Size: Division
- Engagements: Eastern Front (1941-1945): Operation Barbarossa; Battles of Rzhev; Battle of Smolensk (1943); Operation Bagration; Riga Offensive (1944); Battle of Memel; Courland Pocket
- Decorations: Order of the Red Banner
- Battle honours: Vitebsk

The 179th Vitebsk Red Banner Rifle Division was an infantry division of the Soviet Union's Red Army during World War II.

== World War II ==
=== Formation ===
Established at Vilnius on 17 August 1940 as part of the 29th Lithuanian Territorial Rifle Corps on the basis of the 1st Infantry Division of the Lithuanian Army:

Lithuanian Army units from which the Soviet unit was formed	Soviet units
1st Division's HQ, Lithuanian Army's Staff	HQ
1st Division's HQ, Lithuanian Army's Staff, 9th Infantry Regiment, 2nd Cavalry Regiment	215th Rifle Regiment
1st, 8th Infantry Regiments, 1st Cavalry Regiment	234th Rifle Regiment
2nd, 3rd Infantry Regiments, 3rd Cavalry Regiment	259th Rifle Regiment

=== Battles ===
With 29th Rifle Corps of 11th Army on June 22, 1941. Fought at Kalinin, Gomel, and Vitebsk; with 4th Shock Army of the Kurland Group (Leningrad Front) May 1945.

== After World War II ==
It was reduced to the 27th Rifle Brigade in 1948 at Uralsk. It became a division again in October 1953.

In 1955, the division became the 4th Rifle Division at Buzuluk in the South Ural Military District.

== See also ==
- List of infantry divisions of the Soviet Union 1917–1957

== Books ==
- Feskov, V.I.; Golikov, V.I.; Kalashnikov, K.A.; Slugin, S.A. (2013). Вооруженные силы СССР после Второй Мировой войны: от Красной Армии к Советской [The Armed Forces of the USSR after World War II: From the Red Army to the Soviet: Part 1 Land Forces] (in Russian). Tomsk: Scientific and Technical Literature Publishing. ISBN 978-5-89503-530-6.
- Robert G. Poirier and Albert Z. Conner, The Red Army Order of Battle in the Great Patriotic War, Novato: Presidio Press, 1985. ISBN 0-89141-237-9.
