= 362nd Rifle Division =

362nd Rifle Division (10 August 1941 – May 1945)
- Active: 1941–1945
- Country: Soviet Union
- Branch: Red Army
- Type: Division
- Role: Infantry
- Engagements: Battles of Rzhev; Operation Mars; Operation Kutuzov; Battle of the Dniepr; Operation Bagration; Vistula-Oder Offensive; Battle of Berlin
- Decorations: Order of the Red Banner Order of Suvorov Order of Kutuzov
- Battle honours: Upper Dniepr

Commanders
- Notable commanders: Col. Ivan Poluektovich Arkhipov; Col. Sergei Yakovlevich Senchillo; Maj. Gen. Vasilii Nikitich Dalmatov; Maj. Gen Mikhail Yenshin

The 362nd Rifle Division began forming on 10 August 1941, as a standard Red Army rifle division, at Omsk. It did not reach the front until March 1942, assigned to the 22nd Army in Kalinin Front. It served under these commands for the next year, then was pulled out of the line for rebuilding before being moved south to 3rd Army of Bryansk Front, and later Belorussian Front, for the 1943 summer offensive, during which it was awarded the Order of the Red Banner. It served in 50th Army during Operation Bagration, and earned a battle honor during the crossings of the upper Dniepr River near Shklov, but was soon reassigned to 33rd Army, where it remained for the duration of the war. The 362nd ended the war deep into Germany with 1st Belorussian Front, but in spite of an exemplary record of service, including three unit decorations, it was disbanded shortly thereafter.

== Formation ==
The division began forming on 10 August 1941, at Omsk in the Siberian Military District. It shared much of its early history with the 364th Rifle Division. Its partial order of battle was as follows:

- 1206th Rifle Regiment
- 1208th Rifle Regiment
- 1210th Rifle Regiment
- 936th Artillery Regiment

The division's first commander, Col. Ivan Poluektovich Arkhipov, was assigned on 10 October. By that date it had 9,951 officers and men under command. The division took a remarkably long time to reach the front; it was first assigned to the 58th (Reserve) Army, which was also forming in the Siberian District, in the Reserve of the Supreme High Command. On 22 February 1942, it was finally assigned to the 22nd Army in Kalinin Front, but spent some time in transit. On 7 March, Colonel Arkhipov was replaced in command by Kombrig Nikolai Ivanovich Konchits, but this officer was in turn replaced by Col. Sergei Yakovlevich Senchillo on 28 March. The 362nd would remain in 22nd Army until March 1943, generally holding positions along the northwestern sector of the Rzhev salient.

=== Operation Mars ===
On 30 October 1942, Colonel Senchillo turned the division over to the command of Maj. Gen. Vasilii Nikitich Dalmatov. In the planning for the Second Rzhev-Sychevka Offensive, the Army commander, Maj. Gen. V. A. Yushkevich, gave Dalmatov a diversionary assignment. His division was to attack with the 1208th and 1210th Rifle Regiments against a small German-held salient south of the road from Nelidovo to Olenino. In the event the salient was taken and held, making it one of the few permanent gains by the Red Army in Operation Mars, although casualties in the division were high.

In the aftermath of the battle on 4 January 1943, the chief of staff of Kalinin Front reported on shortcomings in the combat units, including the 362nd:

"...5. Weapons, as a consequence of the lack of care in the combat units, are rusty, filthy, rifles lack foresights; many of the automatic weapons no longer fire automatically because of defects, and heavy machine guns are not operable (185th, 362nd, 238th Rifle Divisions and others).

As the German 9th Army prepared to evacuate the salient its artillery units began firing off excess ammunition, and on 24 February the combat positions of the division were struck by up to 1,000 shells and mortar rounds. When that Army began Operation Büffel on 1 March the 362nd was part of 25th Rifle Corps and briefly took part in the pursuit before being ordered, with its Corps, on 11 March into the Reserve of the Supreme High Command for rebuilding at Plavsk. It remained there with its Corps for about a month before being assigned to Bryansk Front.

== Western Russia and Belorussia ==
As of 1 August, during Operation Kutuzov, the 362nd was directly under command of the 3rd Army in Bryansk Front. On 22 September the division was awarded the Order of the Red Banner in recognition of its general meritorious service during the summer offensive. By 1 October, 3rd Army had been transferred to Central Front and the 362nd was part of 80th Rifle Corps.

At the start of the Novyi Bykhov - Propoisk Offensive on 22 November, the division was on the right flank of 3rd Army with the 1206th Rifle Regiment and the divisional training company holding along the line of the Sozh River nearly to the boundary with 50th Army, with the rest of the division in or near the Army's bridgehead over the river near Rudnia. The 1208th and 1210th were to break out of the bridgehead to the north, and advance along the west bank of the Sozh to make a combined attack from both sides of the river on Propoisk, even though that city was in the sector of 50th Army:

"While reporting to the army commander about his attack, Major General V. N. Dalmatov... declared that the division's units could capture the city. However, the soldiers and officers asked that the army commander not petition for the award of the tiresome honorific name "Propoisk" to the division and regiments... Having been assured that such a petition would not be made, 362nd Rifle Division's units attacked and liberated the city and, soon after, occupied Rzhavka.

By 26 November most of the division had reached positions about 20 km west of the Sozh, while one regiment had liberated the town of Khachniki, on the road to Bykhov.

On 10 December General Dalmatov left command of the division to take the position of deputy commander of 80th Corps. He was replaced by Col. Nikolai Fomich Pukhovskii. At the end of the month, 80th Corps began preparing an offensive operation to destroy the German 267th Infantry Division and advance to the Dniepr. This action began on 4 January 1944, preceded by a deep raid by a ski detachment of about 200 men overnight on 3/4 January against the headquarters of the German division in the village of Pribor, based on intelligence from German prisoners and local inhabitants. The raid was successful in utterly disrupting the command and control of the 267th. At dawn of the 4th, 80th Corps, supported by the 36th Tank Regiment, attacked on a 7 km-wide sector from Palki on the Bobrovka River northward to Uzniki. In total, the disrupted 267th was faced with an attack by elements of six Soviet rifle divisions. In the early going the attackers advanced 4 – 5 km, and the 362nd and 283rd Rifle Divisions quickly encircled and destroyed the German garrison at Palki before driving on northwest towards Nikonovichi. By late on 5 January, 80th Corps was closing up to a new defensive line along the Ukhliast River, the so-called Winterstand line, which had been prepared in advance. The offensive was called off on 8 January, but 80th Corps by that time had severely damaged the 267th Infantry and captured most of the Germans' Bykhov salient. On 13 January General Dalmatov returned to command of the division.

== Operation Bagration ==
In February the division was transferred to the 19th Rifle Corps of 50th Army in the renamed 1st Belorussian Front. On 6 March, Senior Sergeant Stepan Lavrentevich Ushakov, commander of the 1210th Rifle Regiment's reconnaissance platoon, became the division's first Hero of the Soviet Union for his exploits on scouting missions and for his score of 400 kills as a sniper. (Medal No. 3965) In April, 19th Corps and 50th Army were reassigned to 2nd Belorussian Front. In the planning for the summer offensive, 2nd Belorussian Front would take a secondary role holding the German 4th Army in place while it was encircled from the north and south. When the main offensive began on the morning of 23 June, 50th Army was spread over a sector 75 km wide. On the next morning the 19th Corps penetrated the defenses of the 267th Infantry at Ludchitsa, but by 1100 hrs. the attack had been contained. On the 25th General Dalmatov handed his command over to Maj. Gen. Mikhail Yenshin, who would remain in command for the duration; at the same time Dalmatov took over Yenshin's former command, the 307th Rifle Division.

During these days the pace of the offensive picked up and elements of 50th Army reached and forced the Dniepr, in recognition of which the personnel of the 362nd were given a battle honor apparently more to their liking:

"SHKLOV... By order of the Supreme High Command, units that distinguished themselves during the crossing of the Dniepr and the capture of the cities of Mogilev, Shklov and Bykhov are given the names of Upper Dniepr and Mogilev... 362nd Rifle Division (Major General Yenshin, Mikhail Aleksandrovich)... By order of the Supreme High Command of June 28, 1944, and a commendation in Moscow, the troops who took part in the battles for the crossing of the Dniepr and for the liberation of Shklov and other cities are given a salute of 20 artillery volleys from 224 guns.

On the following day, elements of the 362nd and 380th Rifle Divisions, along with three anti-tank artillery regiments, two Guards Mortar regiments, a mortar regiment, two sapper battalions and two truck battalions, were formed into the forward detachments of 50th Army with orders to seize a bridgehead over the Berezina River. On 1 July, 19th Corps crossed the Berezina north of Brodets in the wake of these advance troops; following this, 50th Army cut off the escape of the broken German 4th Army between Berezino and Chervin, and then headed for Minsk.

Later in July the 19th Corps was transferred to 33rd Army in 3rd Belorussian Front; the division would remain in this Army for the duration of the war. In August it was shifted to the 62nd Rifle Corps, where it would also remain for the duration.

== Into Germany ==
During much of September, the 33rd Army was in the Reserve of the Supreme High Command before being reassigned to 1st Belorussian Front in October, where it would remain for the duration. On 5 April 1945, the 362nd was awarded the Order of Suvorov, 2nd degree, for penetrating the border of Brandenburg state, and on the following day General Yenshin was recognized as a Hero of the Soviet Union (Medal No. 6443). At the start of the Berlin offensive in the same month 33rd Army was deployed along the east bank of the Oder River from a bridgehead south of Frankfurt-on-Oder and along the east bank of the Neisse River; in all, a 64 km front with nearly all its forces concentrated on a 3 km sector from Zsetznow to Lossow and another 3.5 km sector between Brieskow and Wisenau. The 362nd was in the first echelon of 62nd Corps. 33rd Army began its attack at 0615 hrs., following a 30-minute artillery preparation. During the course of the day it advanced 4–6 km through wooded and swampy terrain and broke through all of the first and most of the second German defense lines. By the end of the day the 62nd Corps had reached a line from 1.5 km west of Brieskow to Unter Lindow to Rautenkrantz. On 18 April the offensive was resumed at 1050 hrs, after an artillery preparation of 20 minutes, and the Corps advanced another 2 km, capturing height 71.0 and the eastern slopes of height 74.8. By the end of 21 April, 62nd Corps had reached the Oder-Spree Canal.

== Postwar ==
When the war ended, the division held the official name of 362nd Rifle, Upper Dniepr, Order of the Red Banner, Order of Suvorov, Order of Kutuzov Division (in Russian: 362-я стрелковая Верхнеднепровская Краснознамённая орденов Суворова и Кутузова дивизия). According to STAVKA Order No. 11095 of 29 May 1945, part 6, the 362nd is listed as one of the rifle divisions to be "disbanded in place". It was disbanded in Germany in accordance with the directive during the summer of 1945.
