= Dolgorukovo, Lipetsk Oblast =

Rural locality in Lipetsk Oblast, Russia

Coordinates: 52°19′53″N 38°20′27″E

Dolgorukovo (Russian: Долгоруково) is a rural locality (a selo) and the administrative center of Dolgorukovsky District, Lipetsk Oblast, Russia. Population: 5,237 (2021 census); 5,343 (2010 census); 5,649 (2002 census); 5,555 (1989 Soviet census).
