= Dolgorukovsky District =

Dolgorukovsky District Долгоруковский район (Russian)
- District
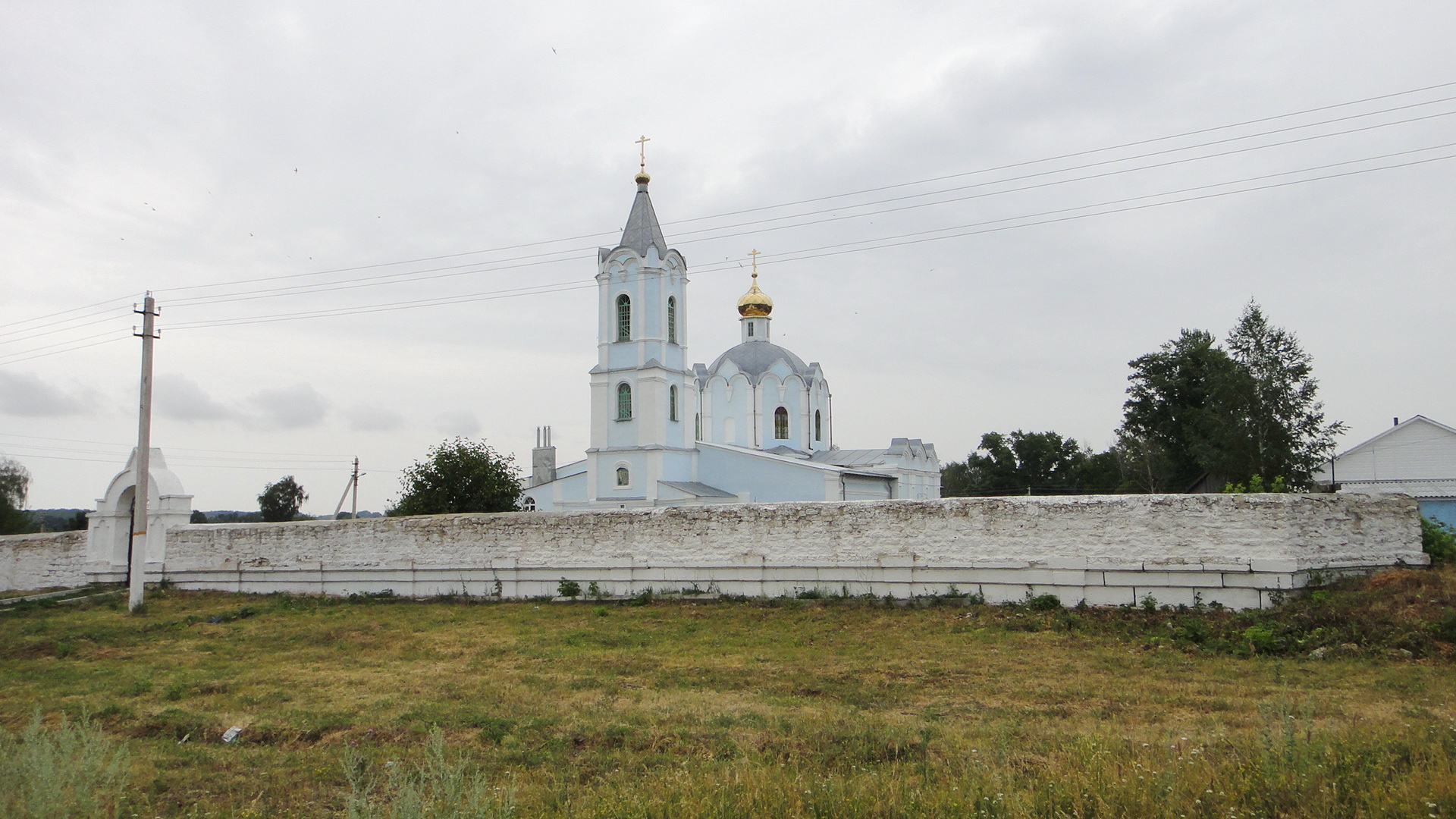
- Church of the Assumption, village Stegalovka, Dolgorukovsky District

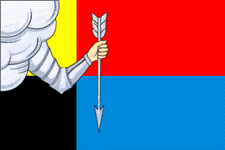
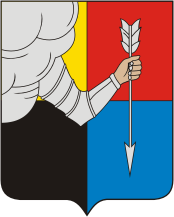
- Flag Coat of arms
- Location of Dolgorukovsky District in Lipetsk Oblast
- Coordinates: 54°25′36″N 20°31′04″E
- Country: Russia
- Federal subject: Lipetsk Oblast
- Administrative center: Dolgorukovo

Area
  - Total: 990 km^{2} (380 sq mi)

Population (2010 Census)
  - Total: 18,623
  - Density: 19/km^{2} (49/sq mi)
  - Urban: 0%
  - Rural: 100%

Administrative structure
  - Administrative divisions: 14 selsoviet
  - Inhabited localities: 97 rural localities

Municipal structure
  - Municipally incorporated as: Dolgorukovsky Municipal District
  - Municipal divisions: 0 urban settlements, 14 rural settlements
- Time zone: UTC+3 (MSK)
- OKTMO ID: 42618000
- Website: http://www.dolgorukovo.org/

Dolgorukovsky District (Russian: Долгору́ковский райо́н) is an administrative and municipal district (raion), one of the eighteen in Lipetsk Oblast, Russia. It is located in the southwest of the oblast. The area of the district is 990 square kilometers (380 sq mi). Its administrative center is the rural locality (a selo) of Dolgorukovo. Population: 16,126 (2021 census); 18,623 (2010 census); 21,127 (2002 Census); 23,488 (1989 Soviet census). The population of Dolgorukovo accounts for 32.5% of the district's total population.
