= 29th Rifle Corps =

- Active: 1940 August–1941 September (1st formation); 1943 March–1943 April (2nd formation); 1943 July–1957 October (3rd formation)
- Allegiance: Soviet Union
- Branch: Soviet Red Army
- Engagements: World War II; Eastern Front; Operation Barbarossa

The 29th Rifle Corps (Lithuanian: 29-asis teritorinis šaulių korpusas) was formed several times in the Soviet Red Army, each formation primarily seeing combat on the Eastern Front during World War II. The first formation of the 29th Rifle Corps was known as the 29th Lithuanian Territorial Rifle Corps, composed of troops of the former Lithuanian army, active from the Soviet Union's annexation of Lithuania in August 1940 until September 1941. A second formation existed from March to April 1943, and a third formation was formed in June 1943. This third formation continued to exist until 1957 when it became the 29th Army Corps, which disbanded in 1969.

== First formation - Territorial Rifle Corps ==
The 29th Lithuanian Territorial Rifle Corps was formed in accordance with an order of the People's Commissar of Defence of 17 August 1940, from Lithuanian Army troops following the forced annexation of that country to the Soviet Union. The personnel of the corps wore Lithuanian Army uniforms with Red Army symbols sewn on. The corps headquarters was located in Vilnius, including the 179th and 184th Rifle Divisions, under the command of Lieutenant General Vincas Vitkauskas, the former commander of the Lithuanian Army. Major General Alexander Samokhin replaced Vitkauskas on 3 June 1941.

The German invasion of the Soviet Union, Operation Barbarossa, began on June 22, 1941. On July 17, 1941, the corps headquarters departed for Velikiye Luki, occupied by the German 19th Panzer Division, where the formation of the corps was carried out with the 48th Tank Division (Soviet Union). On July 21, 1941, the corps appears to have taken Velikiye Luki, and defended it until August 25, 1941, when the city was again abandoned. On August 20–21, 1941, units of the corps went over to the offensive, and began penetrating the enemy's defence, but they themselves were entrapped, and withdrew by the end of August 1941.

On September 1, 1941, the corps headquarters was withdrawn from the fighting, and on September 23, 1941, it was disbanded.

== Second formation ==
The second formation existed March–April 1943.

== Third formation ==
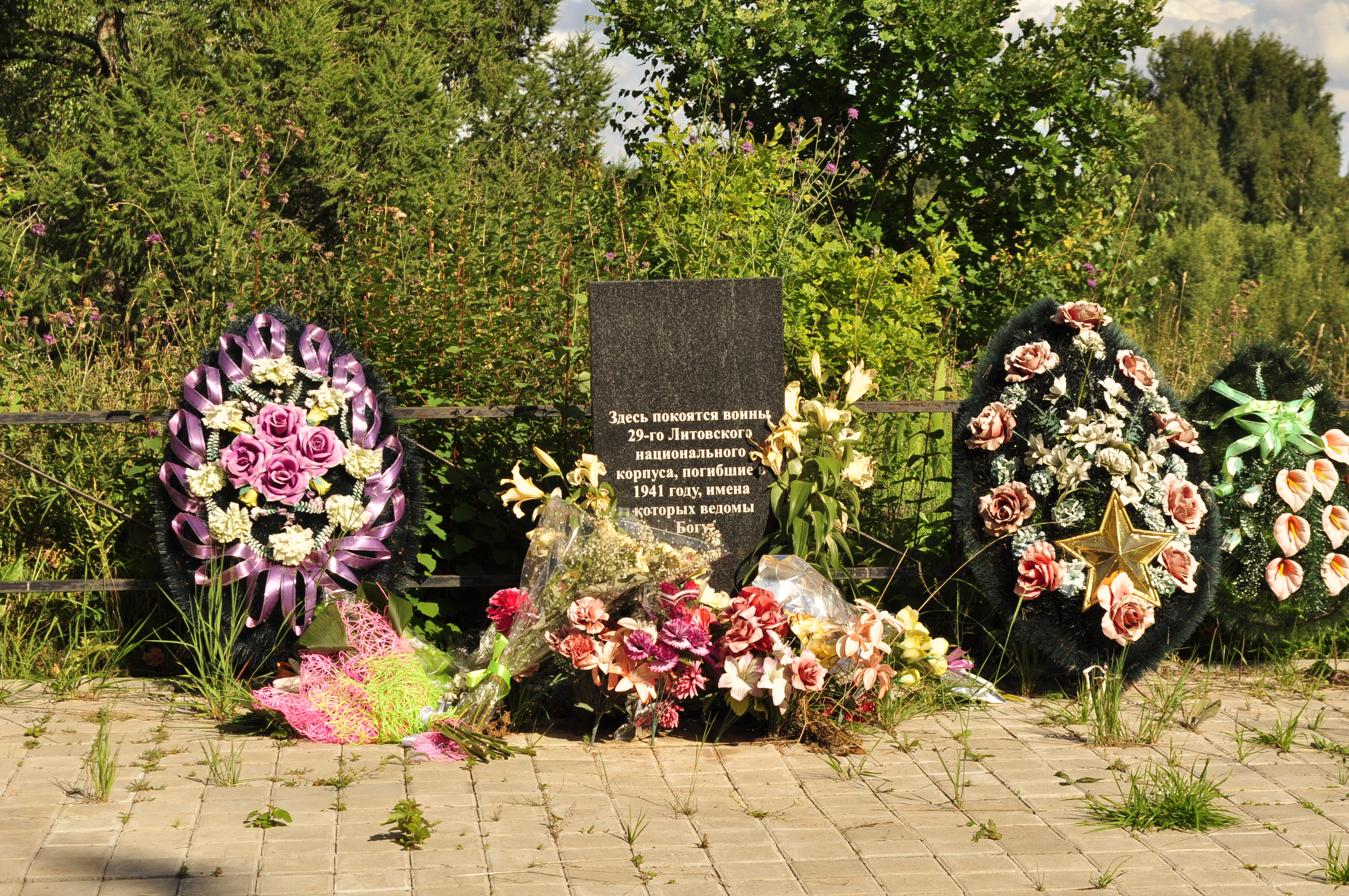
Monument to the fallen soldiers of the 29th Rifle Corps in Velikiye Luki

Originally formed on 25 June 1943, Included 55th Rifle Division (IIIrd Formation), in September–October–November 1943 while part of 60th Army.

On 10 May 1945, the third formation of the 29th Rifle Corps comprised the:

- 73rd Rifle Division
- 102nd Rifle Division
- 217th Rifle Division

Five months later, the corps had the same three divisions, but they were in the North Caucasus Military District. The 73rd was based at Novorossiysk, the 102nd at Armavir and the 217th at Nalchik.

In May 1946, the corps was reorganized under a peacetime structure, with its divisions being reduced to the 8th, 9th and 39th Separate Rifle Brigades. The 8th was based at Maykop, the 9th at Armavir and the 39th at Stavropol. In March 1947, the 9th Separate Rifle Brigade was disbanded. On 23 July 1949, the corps became the 29th Mountain Rifle Corps. The 8th Separate Rifle Brigade became the 9th Mountain Rifle Division and the 39th became the 73rd Mountain Rifle Division. In 1954, the corps was re-designated as a regular rifle corps again.

On 10 October 1957, the 29th Rifle Corps became the 29th Army Corps. The 9th and 73rd Mountain Rifle Divisions became motor rifle divisions. In 1960, the 29th Army Corps was at Krasnodar and had the 9th and 73rd Motor Rifle Divisions. In 1966 it moved to Belogorsk in Amur Oblast. On 22 February 1968, 29th Army Corps was awarded the Order of the Red Banner.

On 25 June 1969 the 29th Army Corps became the 35th Army.
