= Timeline of the Russo-Ukrainian war (1 December 2023 – 31 March 2024) =

Timeline of the Russo-Ukrainian war (2022–present)
- Prelude; (up to 23 February 2022); Initial invasion; (24 February – 7 April 2022); Southeastern front; (8 April – 28 August 2022); 2022 Ukrainian counteroffensives; (29 August – 11 November 2022); Second stalemate; (12 November 2022 – 7 June 2023); 2023 Ukrainian counteroffensive; (8 June 2023 – 31 August 2023); 2023 Ukrainian counteroffensive, cont.; (1 September – 30 November 2023); 2023–2024 winter campaigns; (1 December 2023 – 31 March 2024); 2024 spring and summer campaigns; (1 April – 31 July 2024); 2024 summer–autumn offensives; (1 August – 31 December 2024); 2025 winter–spring offensives; (1 January 2025 – 31 May 2025); 2025 summer offensives; (1 June 2025 – 31 August 2025); 2025 autumn–winter offensives; (1 September 2025 – 31 December 2025); 2026 winter–spring offensives; (1 January 2026 – 31 May 2026); 2026 summer offensives; (1 June 2026 – present)

This timeline of the Russo-Ukrainian war covers the period from 1 December 2023 to 31 March 2024.

This period was characterized by an increased reliance on drones and missiles amid an increasing shortage of Ukrainian artillery ammunition and tanks.

== December 2023 ==
=== 1 December ===
Ukraine claimed that Russian forces launched 25 Shahed drones and one Kh-59 missile. Ukrainian forces claimed to have downed 18 of the drones and the missile.

Ukraine said it had successfully tested domestically made electromagnetic warfare systems to protect soldiers from radar-guided weapons and drones.

Ukrainian media reported that the Security Service of Ukraine (SBU) was behind another bomb attack on a fuel train passing over a rail bridge on the Baikal-Amur Mainline in the Russian Far East. Ukrainian military intelligence (HUR) claimed that a Russian military refueling station in Melitopol was blown up by partisans, killing several soldiers and damaging military equipment.

The Russian FSB claimed to have arrested a dual Italian-Russian citizen in relation to the derailing of a freight train near Rybnoye, Ryazan Oblast on 11 November. The FSB claimed that he had been recruited in February 2023 and received training in Latvia.

Two pro-Russian separatists from the Donbas captured by Ukraine were sentenced to 12 years in prison for treason.

Russian President Vladimir Putin signed a decree increasing the number of Russian military personnel by 170,000, with the Russian Defence Ministry citing NATO expansion and the war in Ukraine as one of the reasons for the decree.

In an interview with the Associated Press in Kharkiv, Ukrainian President Volodymyr Zelenskyy acknowledged that the Ukrainian counteroffensive "did not achieve the desired results", and said the war had entered a new phase with the winter season.

Germany delivered a military aid package to Ukraine that included four HX81 tractors, eight Zetros off-road trucks, four other vehicles, 15 HLR 338 precision rifles, 60,000 rounds of ammunition, five drone-detection systems, laser range finders, and more than 4,000 155 mm shells.

The US imposed sanctions on three transnational firms for violating a price cap imposed by the US Treasury Department on Russian oil in response to the invasion of Ukraine.

The International Federation of Red Cross and Red Crescent Societies suspended the membership of the Belarus Red Cross after it refused to remove its head Dzmitry Shautsou, who admitted involvement in the deportation of Ukrainian children from Russian-occupied territories.

=== 2 December ===
Ukraine released a video reportedly showing two unarmed Ukrainian soldiers being executed by Russian soldiers after surrendering near the frontline village of Stepove, Donetsk Oblast. The Ukrainian military later said that the perpetrators were killed on 4 December.

The SBU said that it had prevented former Ukrainian president Petro Poroshenko from going to Hungary to meet with Prime Minister Viktor Orban, saying that Russia was planning to use the meeting "in psychological operations against Ukraine."

=== 3 December ===
Three people were killed in separate Russian attacks in Donetsk and Kherson oblasts.

=== 4 December ===
The SBU said it had launched two drone strikes that destroyed Russian ammunition and equipment depots near Svatove, occupied Luhansk Oblast. It also arrested a resident of Kyiv on suspicion of aiding Russian airstrikes on the capital and a businessman for trying to sell stolen aircraft components to Russia.

Nepal confirmed that six of its nationals had been killed while fighting for Russia in Ukraine and that a seventh was captured. CNN later estimated that Russia had recruited thousands of Nepalis to fight its war.

The Biden administration warned that funding for Ukrainian military aid would run out by the end of the year and requested more funding from the US Congress. Bulgarian president Rumen Radev vetoed an agreement to donate to send 100 surplus APCs to Ukraine, sending the arrangement back to the National Assembly for reconsideration. The assembly subsequently voted to override Radev's veto on 8 December.

=== 5 December ===
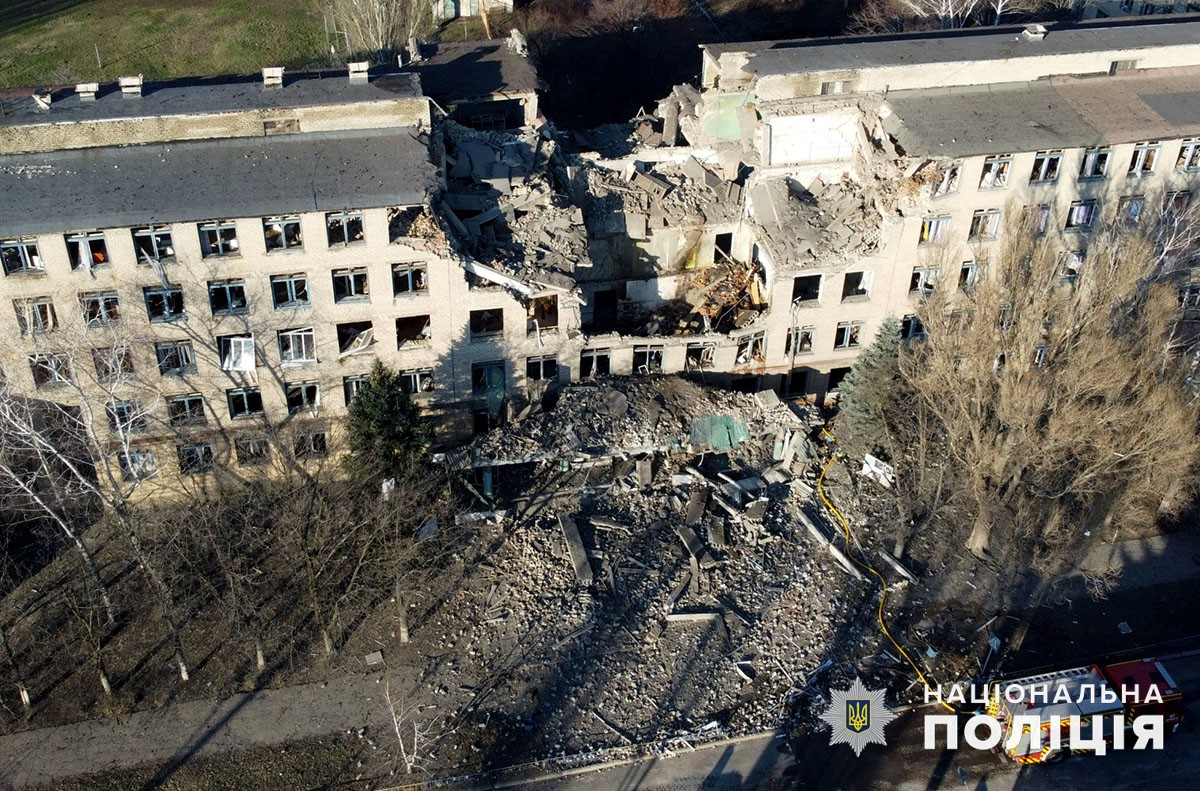
Polytechnic college in Selydove (Donetsk Oblast) after Russian strike on 5 December

Two people were killed in a Russian attack on Kherson. One person was killed in a separate attack in Donetsk Oblast.

The UK Ministry of Defence assessed that Russian forces were in control over most of Marinka, with Ukrainian forces retaining control over "pockets of territory in the western edge of the town".

The Ukrainian Air Force claimed to have shot down a Russian Su-24M bomber aircraft preparing to launch airstrikes near Snake Island with an anti-aircraft missile from an Su-30SM fighter plane.

Russia claimed to have shot down 35 Ukrainian drones over Crimea. Ukrainian media reported that the Marine Oil Terminal in Feodosia, a Nebo-M radar system near Baherove, as well as a military helicopter parking lot, a P-18 Terek radar complex, and a Baikal-1M anti-aircraft missile control system were targeted in the attacks, causing significant damage.

The US imposed sanctions on the head of the Belarus Red Cross, Dzmitry Shautsou, for his role in the deportation of Ukrainian children from Russian-occupied territories, and on Belgium-based businessman Hans de Geetere, who is alleged to lead an international network procuring sophisticated electronics with potential military applications for Russia-based end-users.

=== 6 December ===
Ukrainian media reported that former MP Illia Kyva, who fled to Russia after the 2022 invasion and subsequently called on Putin to launch a "pre-emptive strike" on Ukraine, was shot and killed in a special operation by the SBU in Moscow. It also reported that Oleg Popov, a deputy in the Luhansk People's Republic regional assembly, was killed in a car bombing orchestrated by the SBU in Luhansk city.

A Ukrainian court sentenced a Russian soldier in absentia to 15 years' imprisonment for shooting at civilians near Izium in June 2023, while a resident of Luhansk Oblast who was captured near Bilohorivka in May 2023 was sentenced to 12 years' imprisonment for joining a pro-Russian armed group.

The G7 announced that it would ban imports of Russian diamonds from 2024 as part of sanctions imposed against Russia for its invasion of Ukraine.

The US Senate blocked a funding bill that included aid for Ukraine, Israel and Taiwan, with every Republican senator voting against it.

Documents seen by Reuters revealed that Ukraine was requesting more weapons from the United States such as three types of drones, F/A-18 Hornets, C-17 Globemasters, C-130J Super Herculess, AH-64 Apache and Black Hawk helicopters, and THAAD air defence systems.

=== 7 December ===
One person was killed in an overnight Russian drone attack on the port of Izmail.

Ukrainian actor Vasyl Kukharskyy was announced to have died from injuries sustained while fighting on the front in September.

Russian-installed authorities announced that they would start a "voluntary" evacuation of Nova Kakhovka on 13 December, citing the town's proximity to the fighting in the east bank of the Dnipro River.

Ukraine imposed sanctions on 300 individuals and entities linked to Russia. Among those sanctioned were Apti Alaudinov, the commander of the Chechen Akhmat battalion fighting in Ukraine, Ramzan Tsitsulayev, former special envoy of Chechen leader Ramzan Kadyrov to Ukraine, Midhat Shagiakhmetov, deputy prime minister of Tatarstan, and Adil Shirinov, CEO of the Ulyanovsk Automobile Plant.

Russian authorities claimed to have arrested a Belarusian national who was accused of bombing two trains on the Baikal-Amur Mainline on behalf of Ukrainian intelligence on 29–30 November. Two other individuals, including a former soldier were also arrested on suspicion of organizing arson attacks, spying on behalf of Ukraine and sending money to the Ukrainian military.

A court in Chernihiv Oblast sentenced a Russian soldier to 12 years' imprisonment for abducting and taking hostage a 15-year old for four days in 2022 in an effort to coerce his mother, a soldier, to give intelligence on Ukrainian positions.

=== 8 December ===
One person was killed in a Russian missile attack on Pavlohrad Raion, Dnipropetrovsk Oblast.

The SBU announced that a former director of a state-owned defense company and three others were charged with trying to embezzle Hr 3.9 million ($106,500) in funds used to procure Su-27 aircraft parts.

Germany delivered a military aid package to Ukraine that included 11 reconnaissance drones, six border protection vehicles, eight off-road Zetros trucks, 100,000 first aid kits and other medical materials, 33 GMG automatic grenade launchers, and additional 155 mm artillery shells.

The International Olympic Committee allowed Russian and Belarusian athletes to compete as neutrals in the 2024 Summer Games in Paris, in a decision that was criticized by both Russia and Ukraine.

=== 9 December ===
Two people were killed in a Russian missile attack in Kupiansk. One person was killed in a Russian drone attack on Beryslav, Kherson Oblast.

=== 11 December ===
The Ukrainian Air Force claimed to have downed eight ballistic missiles and 18 drones overnight. One person suffered shrapnel wounds and three others suffered acute reactions to stress in Kyiv. An unfinished apartment building was also damaged.

One person was killed by Russian shelling in Kherson.

The UK government announced the transfer to Ukraine of two Sandown class minehunters from the Royal Navy.

The International Monetary Fund authorised a $900 million disbursement to Ukraine from its loan program.

Slovak truckers began blockading the Slovakia–Ukraine border demanding that the EU restore entry restrictions on Ukrainian trucking firms that were removed following the Russian invasion.

=== 12 December ===
One person was killed in a Russian drone strike on Odesa.

Russian air defences reportedly shot down a Ukrainian Tochka-U missile over Belgorod Oblast.

A "massive" cyberattack caused disruptions at Ukraine's largest mobile phone operator Kyivstar, and Monobank, one of the country's biggest banks. Authorities reported that the attack also disabled air raid warning systems in Kyiv Oblast, Sumy and Dnipro. The Russian hacker group Solntsepek, which is believed by Ukraine to be run by Russian military intelligence, subsequently claimed responsibility for the attack.

The HUR said that its cyber units, along with the Ukrainian Defence Ministry, hacked into the central server of the Federal Tax Service of Russia, as well as 2,300 of its regional servers, extracting sensitive information and destroying the entire tax database with malware.

During President Zelenskyy's meeting with US President Joe Biden at the White House, the latter announced a new aid package to Ukraine valued at $200 million.

Finland announced that it would double its manufacture of artillery shells, both for domestic defence and to ensure supplies to Ukraine.

=== 13 December ===
Destructions by fragments of the missiles in Kyiv

Ukrainian officials said Kyiv was targeted by an overnight Russian air attack. About 53 people were injured, while a hospital and several buildings were damaged. Ukraine claimed it had downed all 20 missiles and drones launched.

Russia placed the head of the HUR, Kyrylo Budanov, on its wanted list.

=== 14 December ===
One person was killed in a Russian missile attack in Kherson Oblast.

The UK Ministry of Defence assessed that the Russian 104th Guards Airborne Division likely suffered "exceptionally heavy losses" during its first combat deployment against Ukrainian forces near Krynky.

Romanian authorities said that the remains of a Russian drone were found on its territory near Grindu, around 20 kilometres from the Ukrainian port of Reni. The drone was believed to have been launched over the previous night heading for targets in Odesa Oblast.

In Russia, nine drones were reportedly shot down over Kaluga and Moscow Oblasts.

In a press conference, Putin indicated that Russia would only negotiate with Ukraine "when we achieve our objectives". He stated that another mobilization was unnecessary as "617,000" Russian soldiers were fighting in Ukraine.

Drone footage emerged appearing to show Russian soldiers in Zaporizhzhia Oblast using Ukrainian POWs as human shields as they advanced, in contravention of the Geneva Conventions that regulate treatment of POWs. One was reportedly shown killed in the video.

Germany delivered a military aid package to Ukraine that included a Patriot missile system, 7,390 rounds of 155 mm ammunition, 14 drone detection systems, eight off-road Zetros trucks, and three mine clearing systems. Estonia pledged a military aid package worth 80 million euros ($88 million) to Ukraine, that included Javelin anti-tank missiles, ammunition, machine guns, various vehicles and vessels, and diving equipment.

The Australian Defense Ministry announced a 186 million AUD ($125.6 million) expansion of its Operation Kudu training program for Ukrainian soldiers in the UK.

=== 15 December ===
The EU, minus Hungary, held a "consensus decision" vote that decided to initiate accession talks with Ukraine. However, a four-year funding package, valued at €50 billion, was blocked by Hungary, with Prime Minister Viktor Orbán blocking it because Ukraine is not part of the EU.

Russia claimed to have shot down ten drones over Kursk Oblast and Crimea.

The UK imposed sanctions on Novikombank, a subsidiary of the Russian state conglomerate Rostec, for being "involved in obtaining a benefit from or supporting" the Russian government.

Patriarch Kirill, head of the Russian Orthodox Church, was placed on Ukraine's wanted list for "abetting the conflict".

Lithuania delivered a military aid package to Ukraine that included millions of cartridges, thousands of short-range anti-tank projectiles, and about a thousand folding beds. It also returned several Leopard 2 tanks that were repaired in the country.

=== 16 December ===
Ukraine claimed to have downed 30 of 31 Russian drones launched overnight over 11 regions, with Kyiv recording its sixth air attack for the month.

Russian-installed officials in Kherson Oblast claimed that two people were killed in a Ukrainian HIMARS missile attack during an aid distribution event in Nova Mayachka.

=== 17 December ===
A cross-border incursion was launched into Russia by Russian rebels believed to be allied with Ukraine at Terebreno, Belgorod Oblast.

Two people were killed by Russian shelling in Kherson and Sumy Oblasts. One person was killed in Odesa by a Russian drone that was shot down in a residential area. A total of nine drones were reportedly shot down, along with a cruise missile and an Iskander missile.

The SBU said a recording device was discovered inside offices that were set to host Ukrainian military commander-in-chief Valeriy Zaluzhnyi.

Russian officials claimed to have shot down some 33 Ukrainian drones over Lipetsk, Rostov and Volgograd Oblasts.

The Ukrainian National Agency on Corruption Prevention (NACP) suspended the inclusion of Raiffeisen Bank from its list of international war sponsors following Austrian opposition to new EU sanctions against Russia.

=== 18 December ===
One person was killed by Russian shelling in Kherson.

The SBU said it had arrested a man in Zaporizhzhia on suspicion of aiding Russian airstrikes on the city.

The EU imposed a new round of sanctions against Russia to come into force on 1 January 2024, which included a ban on the import of diamonds except for industrial purposes, penalties on the circumvention of the price cap on Russian oil, and sanctions on 29 firms linked to the Russian military.

Ukrainian Brigadier General Oleksandr Tarnavskyi said that due to shortages of Soviet-era artillery ammunition and lack of Western support, Ukrainian forces had scaled back offensive operations. He also claimed that Russian forces had similar shortfalls in artillery ammunition.

BAE Systems signed an agreement to repair and maintain artillery systems donated by the UK using Ukrainian employees based in Ukraine.

=== 19 December ===
In Russia, four drones were reportedly shot down over Kaluga and Bryansk Oblasts, while a fifth was intercepted near Moscow, prompting the closure of the city's airports.

A Ukrainian court sentenced a man to 15 years' imprisonment for trying to recruit SBU agents into a Russian spy network.

Germany announced several deals worth some $400 million to supply Ukraine with artillery shells. The orders were placed with Rheinmetall and an unidentified French company.

=== 20 December ===
The Ukrainian military acknowledged that Russian forces had advanced by between 1.5 and 2 kilometres in parts of the Avdiivka sector in the past two months and claimed that Russia had taken 20,000 casualties and lost 600 tanks and armored vehicles.

Ukraine's 26th Artillery Brigade claimed that Russia had concentrated 80,000 troops around Bakhmut in preparation for an offensive on Chasiv Yar, a figure that is as many as during the peak fighting of the Battle of Bakhmut and twice as what Russia was deploying concurrently against Avdiivka.

Ukrainian media reported that the Ukrainian hacker group Blackjack carried out a cyber attack against the Russian water utility firm Rosvodokanal with the support of the SBU, gaining access to 1.5 TB of data and deleting another 6 TB.

The SBU placed Russian-Israeli oligarch Mikhail Fridman to its wanted list for helping to finance the Russian war effort in Ukraine.

The Swiss government announced an emergency winter package to Ukraine worth nearly $30 million.

=== 21 December ===
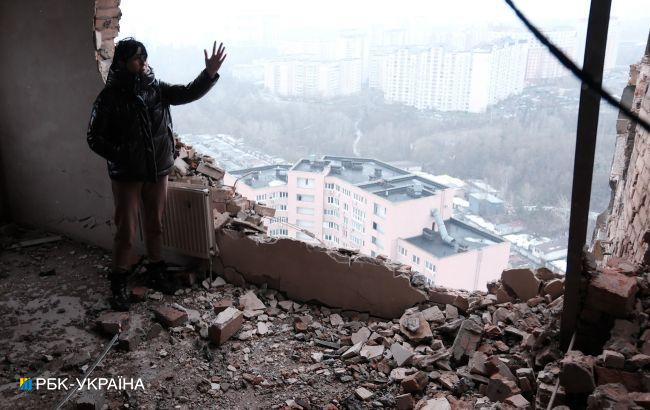
View from a 26-storey residential building in Kyiv, damaged by drone remains

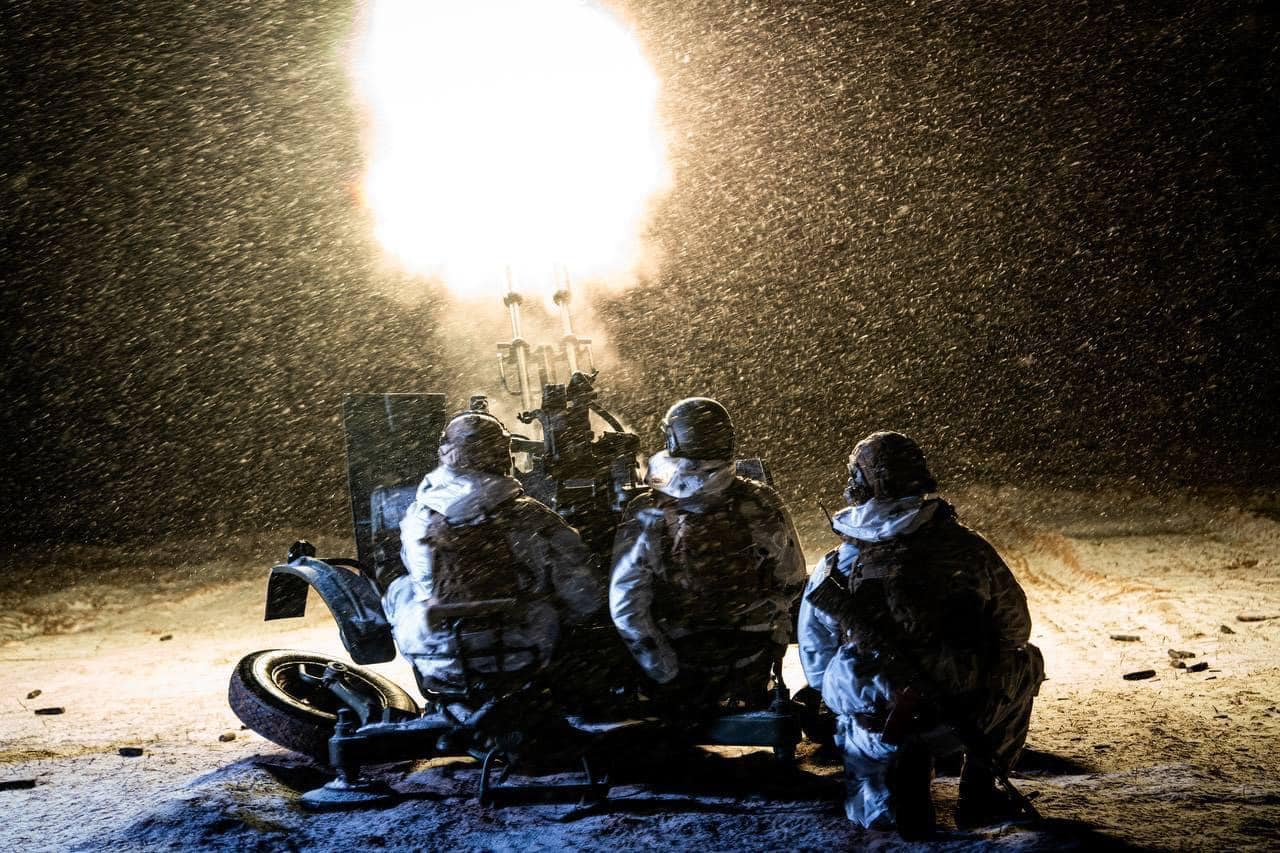
Mobile group of National Guard of Ukraine hunts for Russian drones

Three people were killed while six others were injured by Russian airstrikes on two mines in Toretsk, Donetsk Oblast. Two people were killed by Russian shelling in Nikopol.

Two people were injured in a Russian drone attack on a residential building in Kyiv.

Finland pledged a military aid package to Ukraine valued at 106 million euros ($116 million).

=== 22 December ===
One person was killed in a Russian airstrike in Donetsk Oblast.

Three Russian Su-34 supersonic fighter-bomber aircraft were reportedly shot down by Ukrainian forces over Kherson Oblast.

In Russia, a drone was reportedly shot down outside Podolsk, Moscow Oblast.

Two Russian citizens were sentenced by a court in Khabarovsk to eight and seven years' imprisonment, respectively, "for financing Ukraine's armed forces" after they were accused of donating money to a Ukrainian-linked fund.

The Dutch government announced that it would deliver 18 F-16s to Ukraine, while Germany sent an arms shipment to Ukraine that included ammunition for Leopard tanks, three Gepard anti-aircraft systems, and two Wisent mine-clearing tanks.

=== 23 December ===
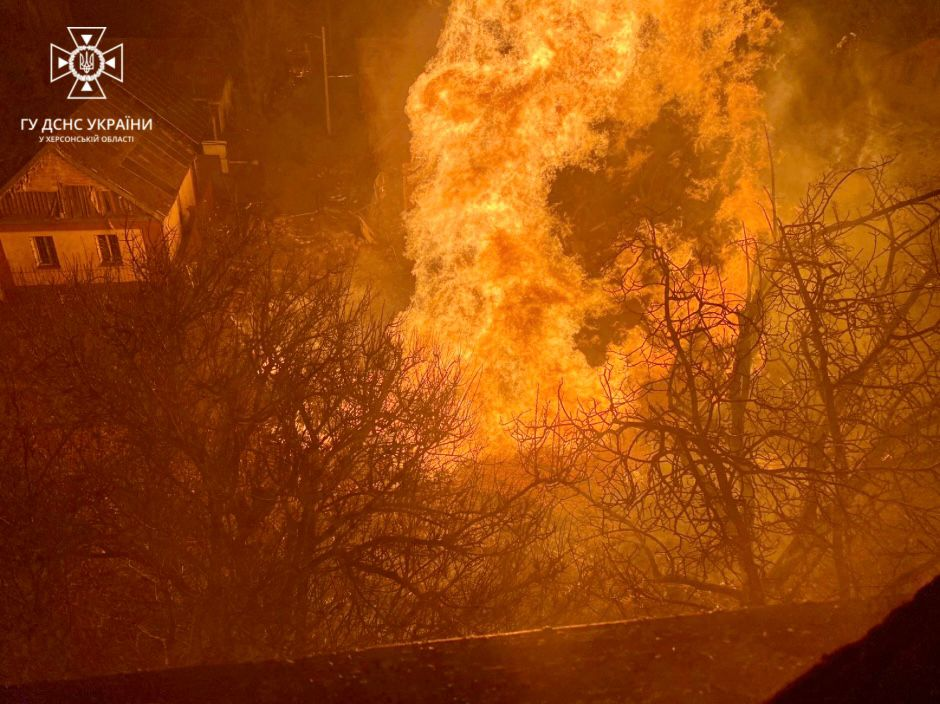
Fire due to shelling of Kherson

One person was killed in a Russian drone attack in Kherson Oblast.

London Mayor Sadiq Khan agreed to send scrap cars to Ukraine, particularly vehicles that did not met the UK's new efficiency standards, following a request from Kyiv's Mayor Vitali Klitschko to send heavy 4x4 vehicles and trucks that are needed in the frontlines.

The Institute for the Study of War (ISW), citing statements from the Russian 810th Naval Infantry Brigade, assessed that Russian forces had begun using chemical weapons, particularly CS gas, against Ukrainian forces in Krynky.

=== 24 December ===
Five people were killed in Russian attacks across Kherson Oblast. The Russian-installed mayor of Horlivka, Donetsk Oblast, claimed that one person was killed and six others were injured by Ukrainian shelling in the city.

The Ukrainian Air Force claimed to have shot down a Russian Su-34 fighter-bomber jet near Mariupol. Another Su-30 was reportedly shot down over the Black Sea.

Ukraine ordered the evacuation of residents of 19 villages in Sumy Oblast within 5 kilometres of the Russian border due to repeated shelling.

=== 25 December ===
Russia said that its forces had taken Marinka while Ukrainian officials said fighting was still ongoing.

Ukraine officially celebrated Christmas on 25 December, instead of 7 January for the first time, following President Zelenskyy's decision in July to abandon what he called "Russian heritage".

The Ukrainian Air Force claimed to have downed 28 out of 31 drones. The drones were downed over five oblasts, while two missiles, a Kh-59 and a Kh-31P, were shot down over Zaporizhzhia Oblast and the Black Sea, respectively.

=== 26 December ===
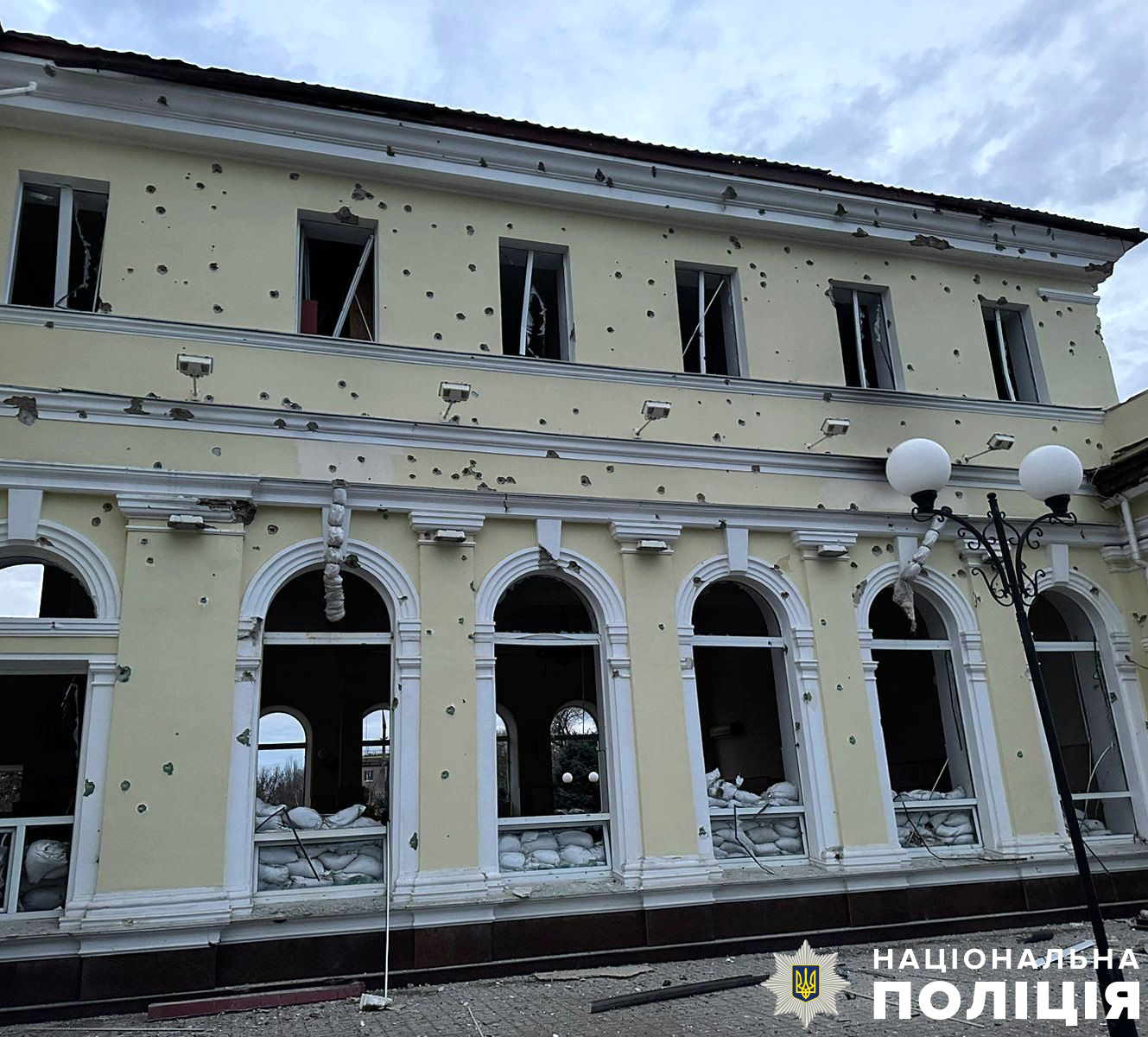
Kherson railway station after the attack

The Ukrainian Air Force claimed to have destroyed the Russian landing ship Novocherkassk in Feodosia following a missile attack by two Su-24s. Russian officials confirmed the attack, during which one person was killed and two injured. Six buildings were damaged. Russian officials also claimed that two Ukrainian Su-24s were shot down.

Ukrainian military commander Valeriy Zaluzhnyi confirmed that Ukrainian forces had withdrawn to the northern outskirts of Marinka.

A police officer was killed while four others, including two police officers, were injured after the Kherson railway station was shelled by Russian artillery during a civilian evacuation.

=== 27 December ===
Two people were killed in a Russian drone attack on Odesa.

In Russia, a drone was reportedly shot down over Rostov Oblast.

Ukraine sentenced Denis Pushilin, the head of the Donetsk People's Republic, to 15 years' imprisonment in absentia for collaborating with Russia and undermining Ukraine's territorial integrity following his role in organizing the region's unrecognized referendum to join Russia.

The Ukrainian Defence Ministry announced a new kind of body armour designed specifically for female soldiers that would be manufactured by a Ukrainian company, ending female soldiers having to fund their own body armour or wear male body armour.

=== 28 December ===
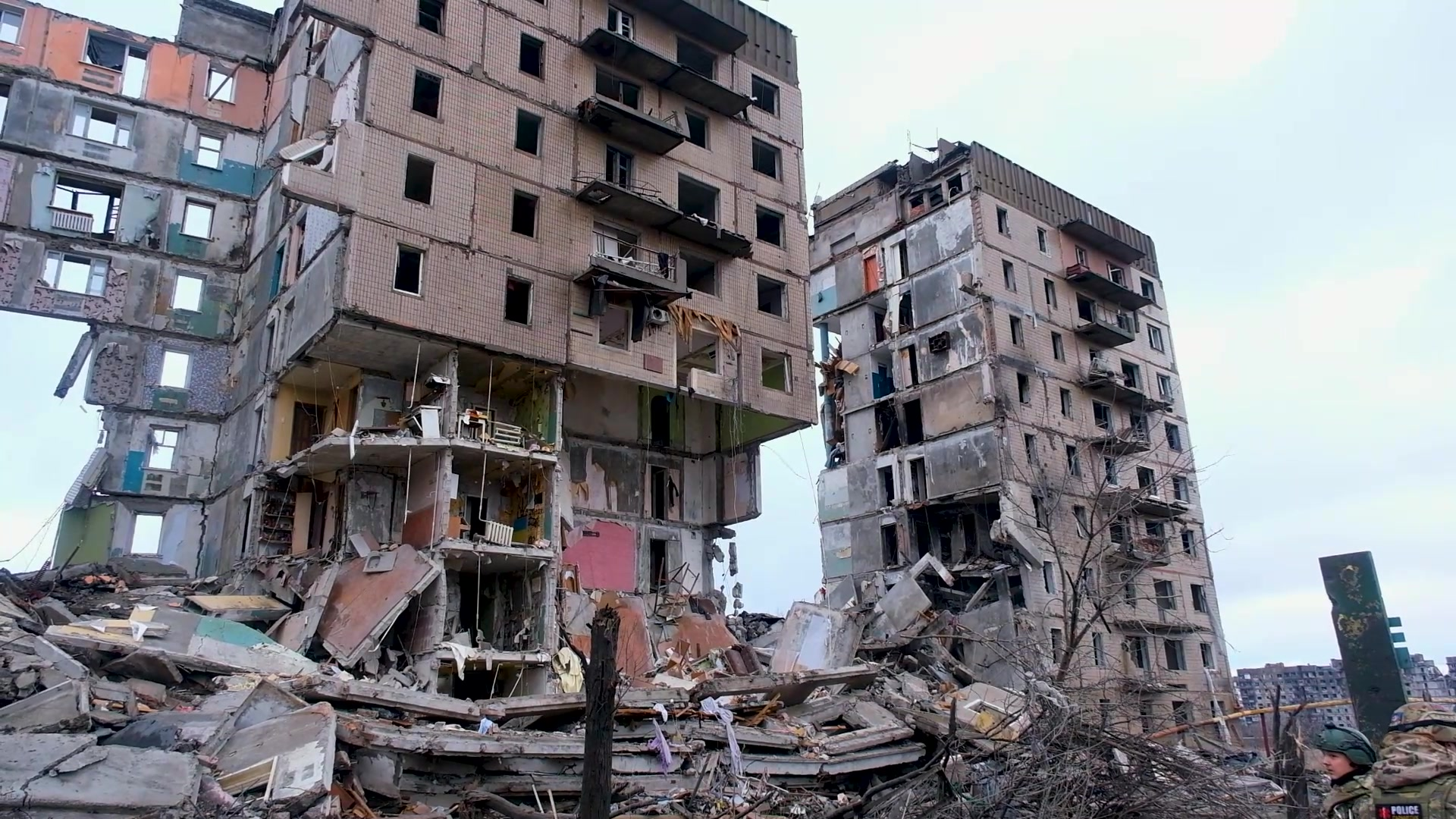
Remains of a residential building in Pivnichne, Donetsk Oblast

Two people were killed by Russian shelling in Bilenke, Zaporizhzhia Oblast. One person was killed by Russian shelling in Kharkiv Oblast.

A Panamanian-flagged cargo vessel on its way to pick up grain in Izmail struck a suspected Russian floating mine in the Black Sea, injuring two sailors.

The US sent a military assistance package to Ukraine valued at up to US$250 million that includes air defence munitions, 105 mm and 155 mm shells, 15 million rounds of various types of ammunition and anti-armour weapons.

Two Russian poets were sentenced to up to seven years' imprisonment by a Moscow court for publicly conducting poetry readings critical of the invasion of Ukraine.

=== 29 December ===
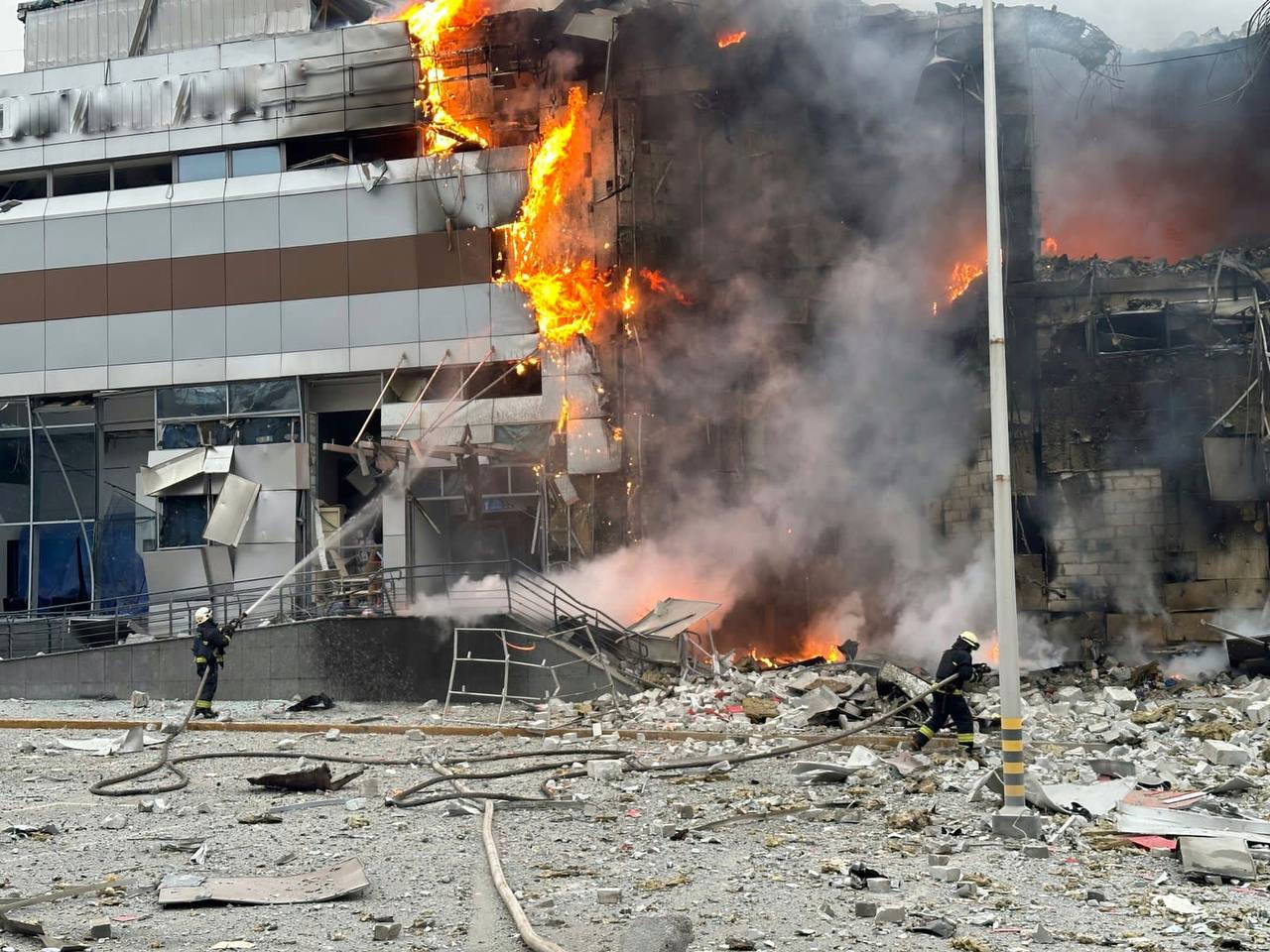
Shopping mall in Dnipro city after the strike of 29 December

Russia launched airstrikes at several cities across Ukraine, with many explosions reported. At least 50 people were killed, and more than 160 injured. Some 122 missiles and a "score" of drones were fired according to the Ukrainian Air Force, most of which were intercepted. Air Force commander Mykola Oleshchuk called it "the most massive attack from the air". A maternity hospital in Dnipro was also struck. Ukrainian General Valerii Zaluzhnyi claimed to have intercepted 27 of the drones and 87 of the missiles. One Russian missile, according to Polish army commander Wiesław Kukuła, entered Polish airspace from Ukraine for approximately three minutes, before it "turned back" for Ukrainian airspace.

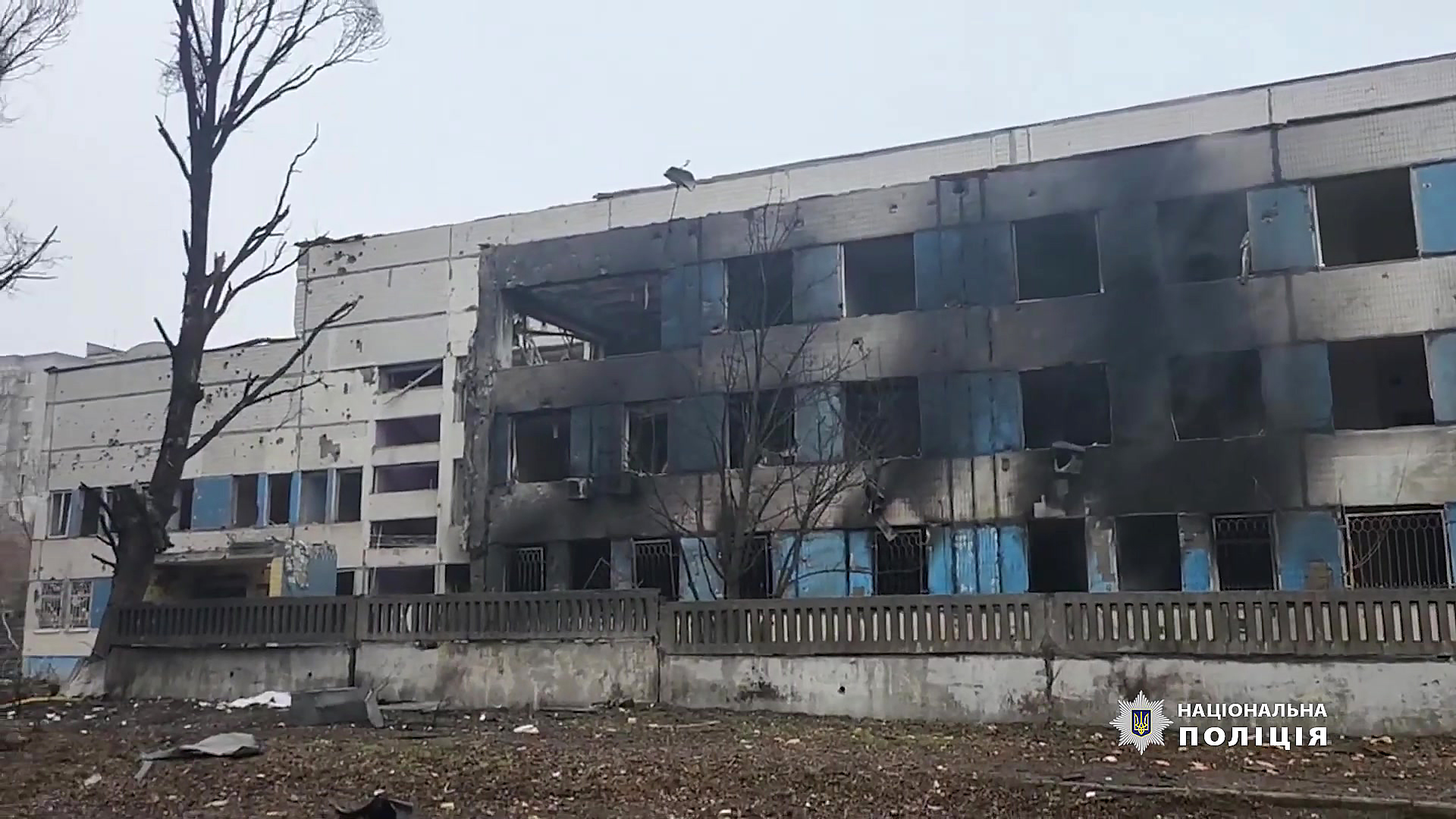
Destroyed maternity hospital in Dnipro

President Zelenskyy visited Ukrainian positions in Avdiivka.

The Russian Defense Ministry claimed that two Ukrainian drones were shot down over Kursk and Bryansk Oblasts.

A Tarantul-class corvette was struck by a Ukrainian drone whilst in harbour at Sevastopol. On 20 January 2024, satellite images confirmed the sinking.

=== 30 December ===
Russia claimed to have shot down 32 drones and 13 missiles over Bryansk, Oryol, Kursk, and Moscow Oblasts. In Belgorod, 25 people, including three children, were killed and 108 were injured by shelling. Several homes and water infrastructure were damaged. In Bryansk, the governor claimed that a child was killed, while a recreational centre, 55 homes, private businesses, a pre-school and football field were damaged.

Seven people were killed in Russian attacks in Donetsk, Kherson, Chernihiv and Zaporizhzhia Oblasts. Twenty-eight people were injured in a Russian missile attack on Kharkiv.

=== 31 December ===
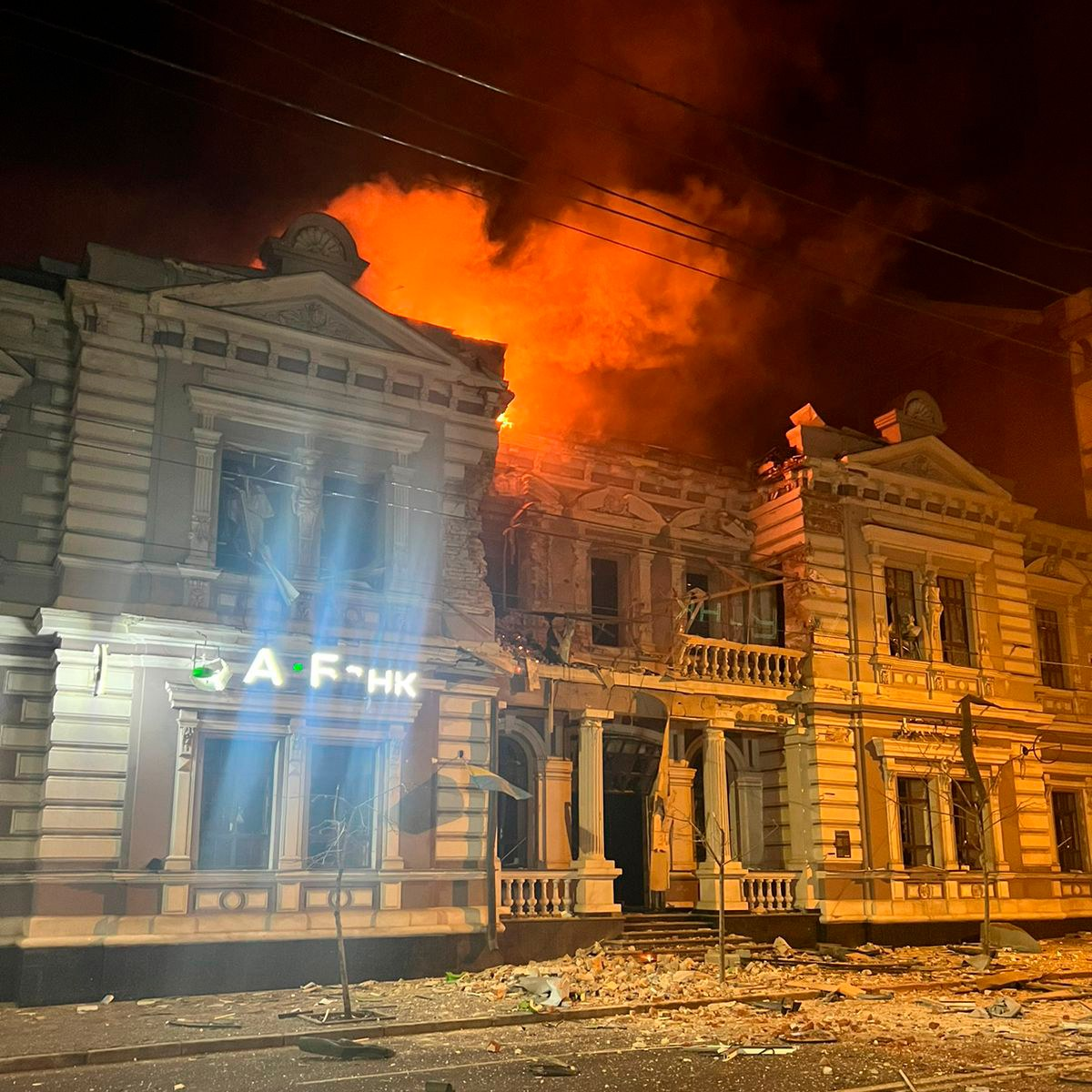
Bank building (architectural monument) in Kharkiv after the attack

Three people were killed by Russian shelling in Borova, Kharkiv Oblast. One person was killed in a Russian drone attack on Odesa. Russia launched a wave of drone and missile attacks in Kyiv and Kharkiv in response to the attack on Belgorod. At least six missiles hit Kharkiv, injuring 22 people and damaging 12 apartment buildings, 13 houses, and a kindergarten.

== January 2024 ==
=== 1 January ===
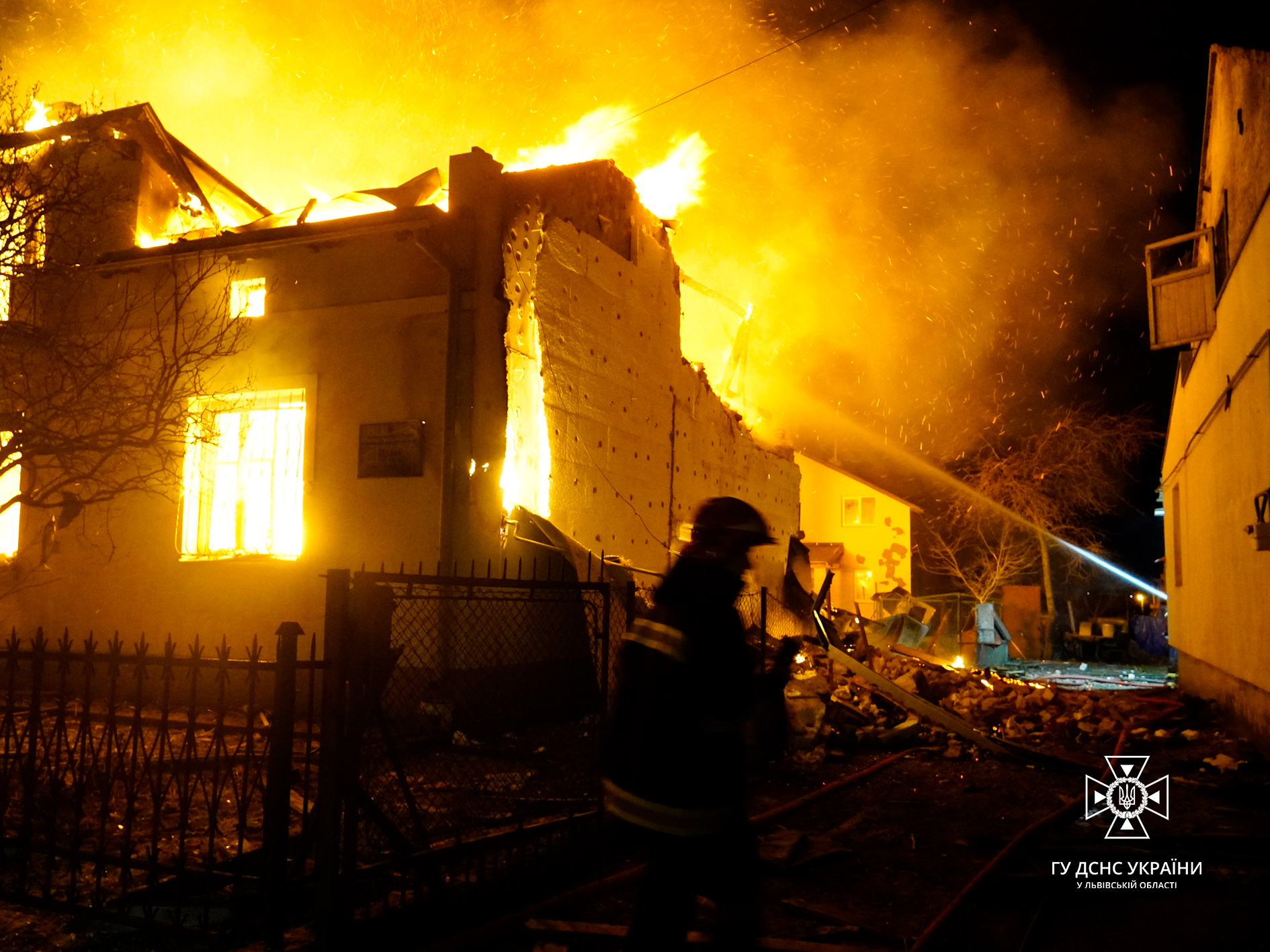
Memorial museum of Roman Shukhevych after the strike

Pro-Russian authorities in Donetsk claimed that four people were killed and 13 others were injured by Ukrainian shelling in the city. Three people were killed by Russian shelling in Donetsk, Kharkiv and Kherson Oblasts. Two people were also killed in a Russian drone attack in Sumy Oblast.

A museum in Lviv about the controversial Ukrainian World War Two fighter Roman Shukhevych was set on fire by a Russian drone. Another drone damaged the building of the Lviv National Agrarian University.

Norway allowed its domestic weapons manufacturers to sell directly to Ukraine.

=== 2 January ===
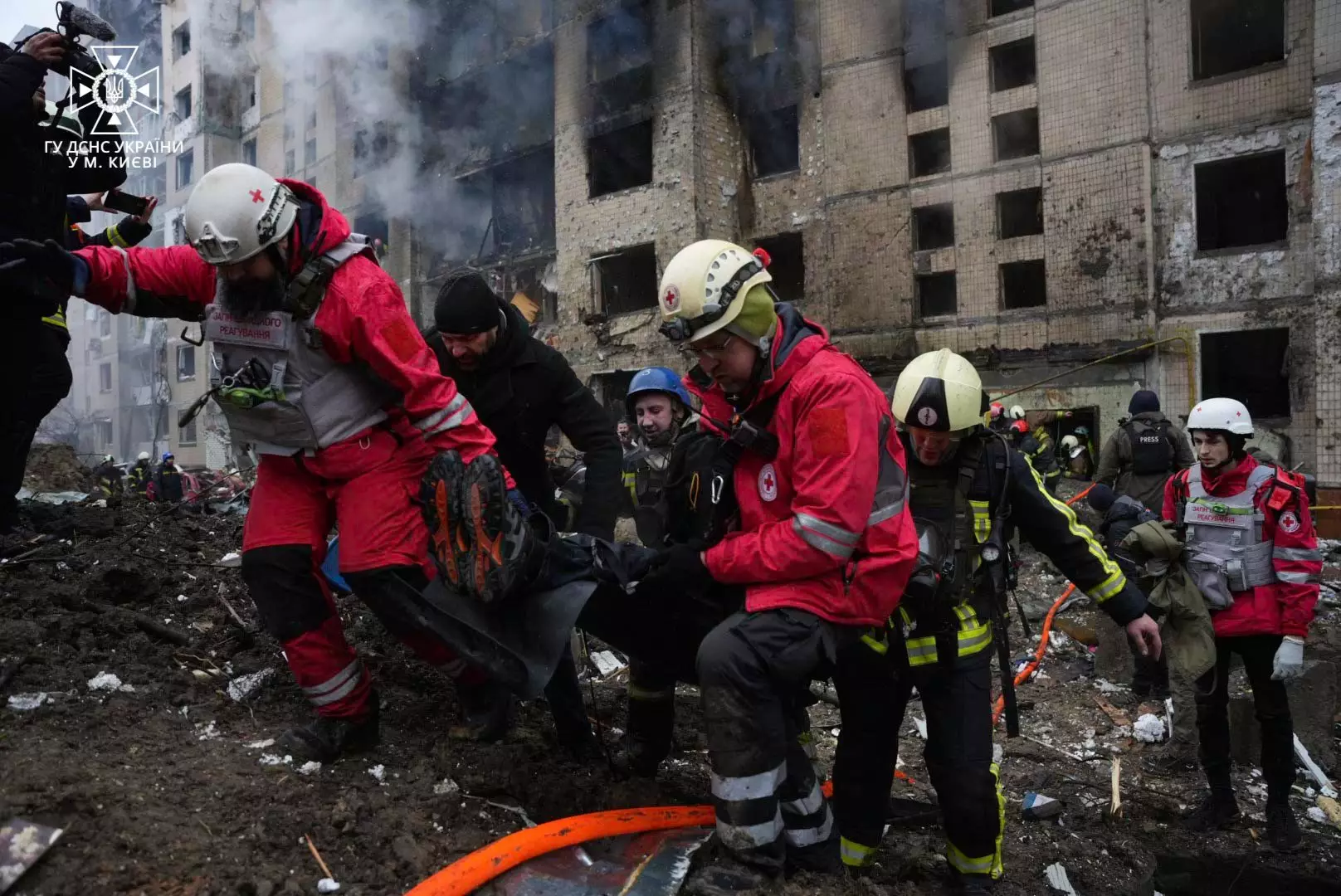
Rescuing of injured person from a damaged residential building in Kyiv

Russia launched a missile attack on Kyiv and Kharkiv, killing six people and injuring 127. The Ukrainian Air Force claimed to have intercepted 72 out of 99 missiles launched. Analysis of remains of a missile fired at Kharkiv found that it was manufactured in North Korea.

In an earlier strike the Ukrainian Air Force claimed to have shot down all 35 drones sent from Russia and occupied Ukraine. In Dnipropetrovsk Oblast falling debris took out a power line and in Mykolaiv Oblast falling debris started a fire that was extinguished. According to calculations based on the figures of the Ukrainian Air Force; Forbes Ukraine claimed that the missile attack that day cost Russia about 620 million US dollars.

Two people were killed by Russian shelling in Donetsk Oblast.

Russia accused Ukraine of launching another missile attack on Belgorod. One missile struck a car, killing a man, another hit an auto market wounding four. Three others were also injured in separate instances. Russian air defences claimed to have shot down 17 missiles fired from a MLRS.

A Russian Air Force aircraft accidentally released its explosive ordinance on the Russian village of Petropavlovka, Voronezh Oblast, injuring four people and damaging six or seven buildings.

Turkey blocked two minehunter vessels donated by the UK from entering the Turkish Straits on its way to Ukraine, citing possible violations of the Montreux Convention Regarding the Regime of the Straits regarding the passage of ships belonging to belligerent parties in the Black Sea during conflicts.

=== 3 January ===
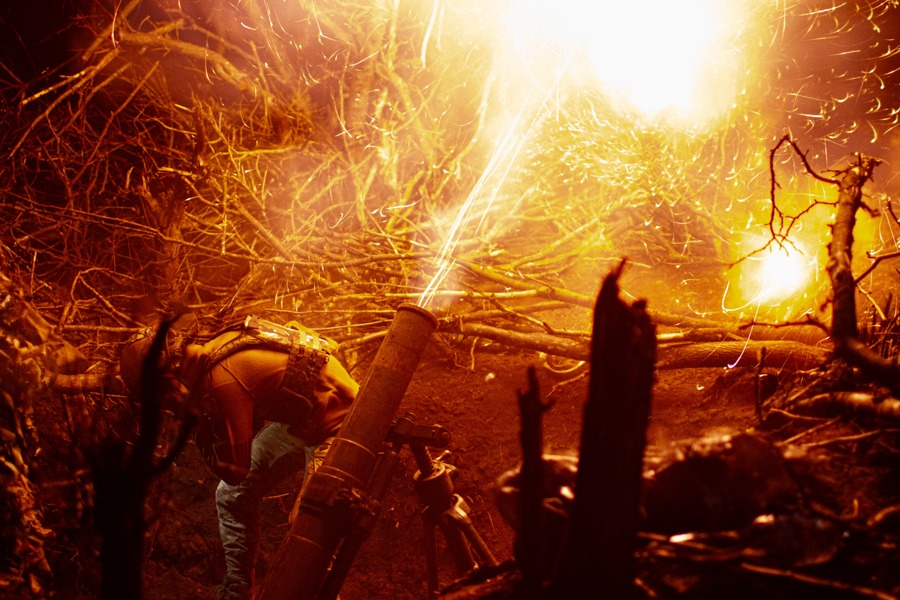
Mortar team of the National Guard of Ukraine works in Zaporizhzhia Oblast

Three people were killed in Russian attacks in Kherson Oblast and Avdiivka.

In Russia, the governor of Belgorod Oblast reported several explosions overnight and claimed that several drones were shot down, while in Crimea, the Russian-installed governor of Sevastopol claimed that a missile was shot down over the port. Ukraine launched 12 missiles and several drones on Belgorod.

230 Ukrainian POWs and 248 Russians were released in the largest prisoner exchange between the two countries since the 2022 invasion. The exchange was mediated by the UAE.

Norway announced it would send two F-16s to Denmark to help train Ukrainian pilots.

The SBU reported that Russian hackers had gained remote control over security cameras in Kyiv, which were then used to check on the positions of air defence units and give battle damage assessments.

=== 4 January ===
One person was killed in a Russian missile attack on an industrial facility in Kropyvnytskyi. Three people were killed by Russian shelling in Donetsk and Kherson Oblasts.

The Russian defence ministry claimed Ukrainian forces fired 10 missiles at Crimea and 10 over Belgorod, which were all shot down. One person was reported injured at Sevastopol by falling debris while three houses were destroyed. Ukraine claimed it had hit two military targets in Crimea, including a command post. They also claimed to have killed 23 Russian soldiers in the Crimean strikes, including 9 special forces and 5 "high–ranking commanders". Two people were injured in Belgorod according to the regional governor.

An Su-34 bomber was set on fire at the Chelyabinsk air base by a Ukrainian saboteur according to the HUR. Russian media reported that the fire was allegedly caused by a 16-year-old boy from Dagestan.

Germany delivered a military aid package to Ukraine that included a Skynex air defense system, 10 Marder armored vehicles, ammunition for Leopard tanks, two TRML-4D air surveillance radars, 30 drone detection systems, IRIS-T anti-air missiles, 10 GO12 ground surveillance radars, 155 mm artillery ammunition, firearms munitions, two mine-clearing tanks, a bridge-laying tank, trucks, assault rifles, combat helmets, and winter camouflage nets and ponchos.

The NACP added the Lithuanian food manufacturing firm Viciunai Group to its list of international war sponsors for continuing to do business in Russia.

=== 5 January ===
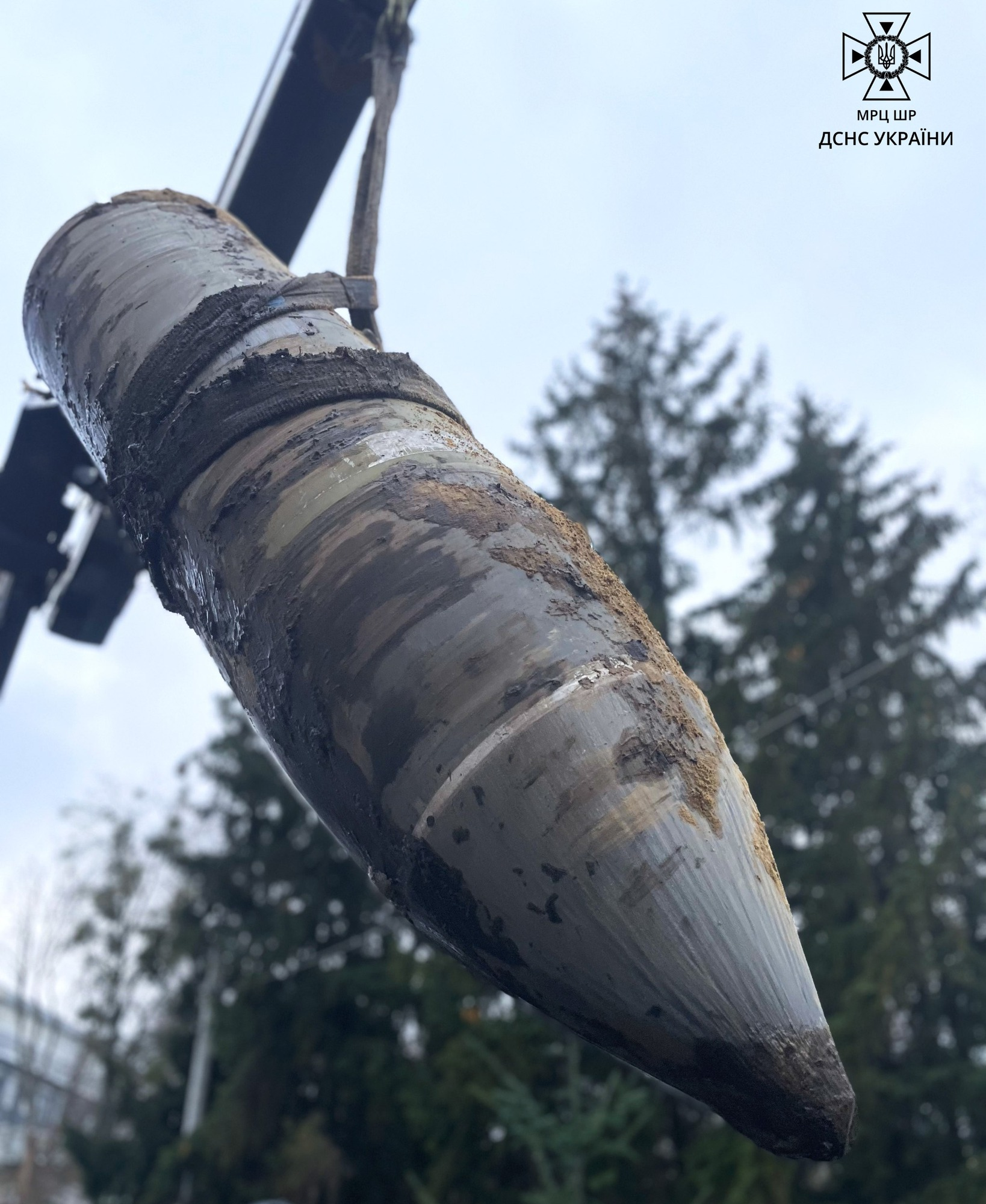
Disposal of a Russian missile (reportedly Kinzhal) in Kyiv

The HUR claimed that it had launched a cross-border raid into the Grayvoronsky District of Belgorod Oblast in Russia, mining a road and inflicting casualties on a Russian platoon.

One person was killed by Russian shelling in Kherson Oblast.

Vladyslav Zalistovskyi, a 23-year-old MiG-29 pilot from the Ukrainian Air Force's 114th Tactical Aviation Brigade who was known by the call sign "Blue Helmet", was killed during a combat mission.

A resident of Donetsk Oblast was sentenced by a Ukrainian court to 12 years' imprisonment for spying on Ukrainian military movements in Avdiivka for Russia.

Ukrainian media reported that Anton Kravets, founder of the Ukrainian rubber goods manufacturer Kyivguma, was arrested on suspicion of exporting tactical harnesses and bandages to Russia through Europe, some of which were used by the Russian military in Ukraine.

In Russia, some 300 residents were evacuated from Belgorod. The oblast's governor, Vyacheslav Gladkov, said on Telegram that his office had received 1,300 applications to evacuate children from the city as well following Ukrainian strikes.

=== 6 January ===
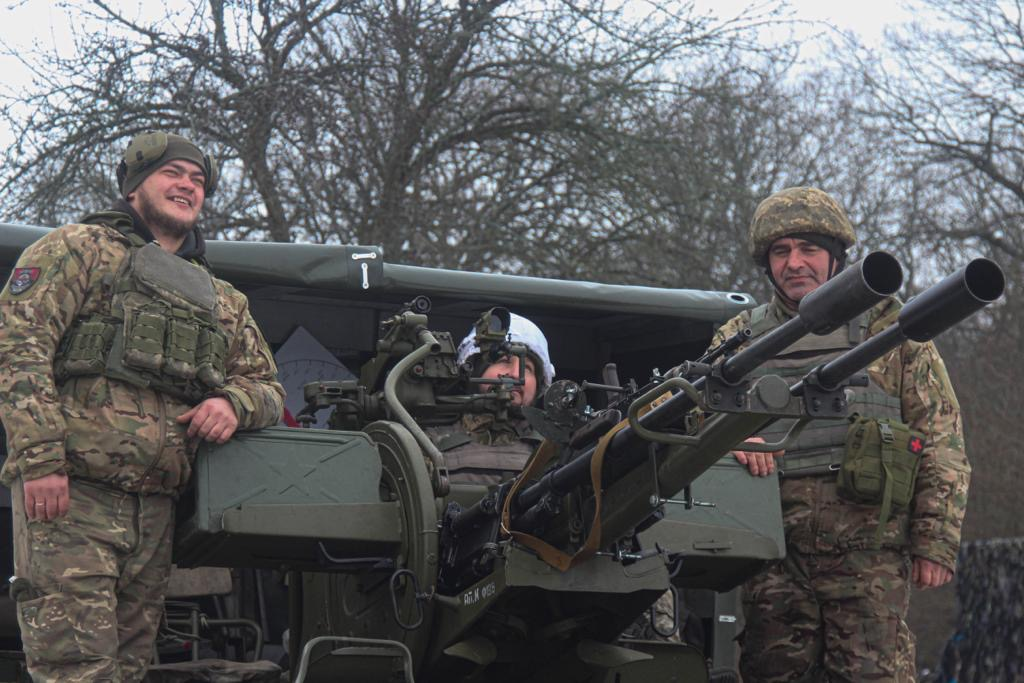
Mobile fire team of National Guard of Ukraine hunting on Russian drones and cruise missiles

Eleven people, including five children, were killed while eight others were injured in Russian missile attacks on Pokrovsk and Myrnohrad, Donetsk Oblast. Two people were killed by Russian attacks in Nikopol and in Pivnichne, Donetsk Oblast.

Russia claimed to have shot down four Ukrainian missiles over Crimea. The Ukrainian Air Force claimed it had carried out an airstrike on Saky airbase.

Denmark announced that the delivery of 19 F-16s to Ukraine will be delayed until the second quarter of 2024 due to the time required to train Ukrainian pilots and operators.

Ukrainian intelligence claimed to have destroyed a partially built rail bridge, fuel trucks and other construction machinery using a missile strike in Hranitne, near Mariupol.

=== 7 January ===
Two people were killed by Russian shelling in Kherson and Kharkiv Oblasts.

The Ukrainian poet Maksym Kryvtsov was announced to have been killed in action.

The Polish government reached an agreement with Polish truckers to end their blockade of the Ukrainian border.

During a visit to Kyiv, Japanese Foreign Minister Yoko Kamikawa pledged 11000 million JPY ($37 million) for a drone detection system along with other equipment such as gas turbines and electricity transformers.

=== 8 January ===
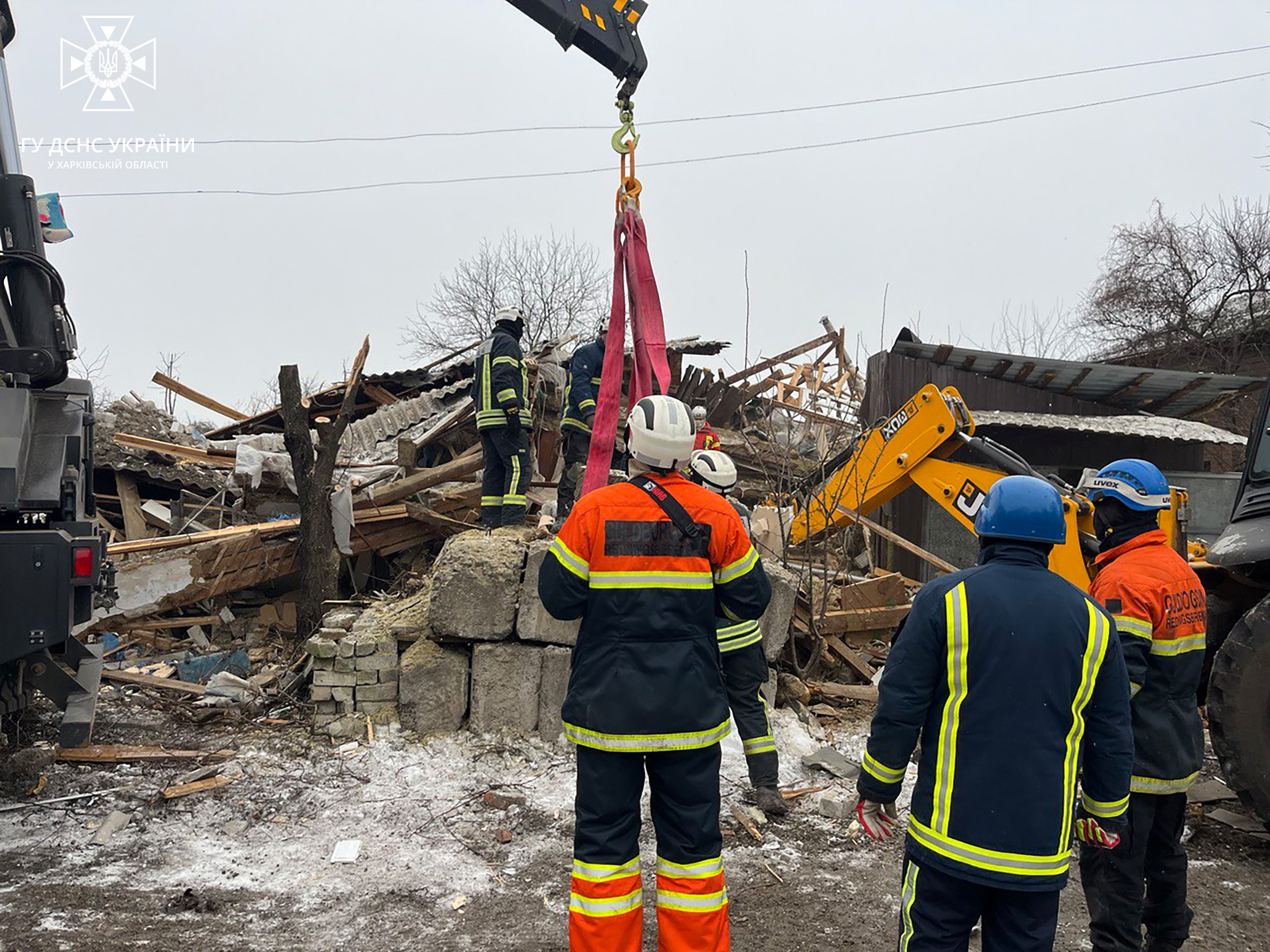
Destroyed house in Zmiiv (Kharkiv Oblast) after the attack

Russia launched a massive missile and drone attack across Ukraine, killing at least five people and injuring at least 45 others in Zaporizhzhia, Khmelnytskyi, Dnipropetrovsk, and Kharkiv Oblasts.

A Russian Air Force aircraft accidentally released an FAB-250 warhead over Rubizhne, Russian-occupied Luhansk Oblast. No casualties or damage were reported, as the warhead failed to detonate.

In Russia, three people were reportedly injured by falling drone debris during an attack on Belgorod Oblast.

The HUR claimed to have taken about 100 GB of classified data valued at $1.5 billion from the Russian drone manufacturer Special Technology Center.

=== 9 January ===
In Russia, a fuel depot and another energy facility in Oryol Oblast were reportedly attacked by Ukrainian drones, injuring three people. A woman was claimed killed in a separate attack on the border village of Gornal in Kursk Oblast.

Ukrainian media reported that the Blackjack hacker group undertook a cyberattack against the Russian Internet provider M9 Telecom, destroying the firm's servers and deleting 20 TB of data.

Russia placed exiled oligarch and opposition leader Mikhail Khodorkovsky on its wanted list for online statements made regarding payments for Russian military fatalities in the invasion of Ukraine.

=== 10 January ===
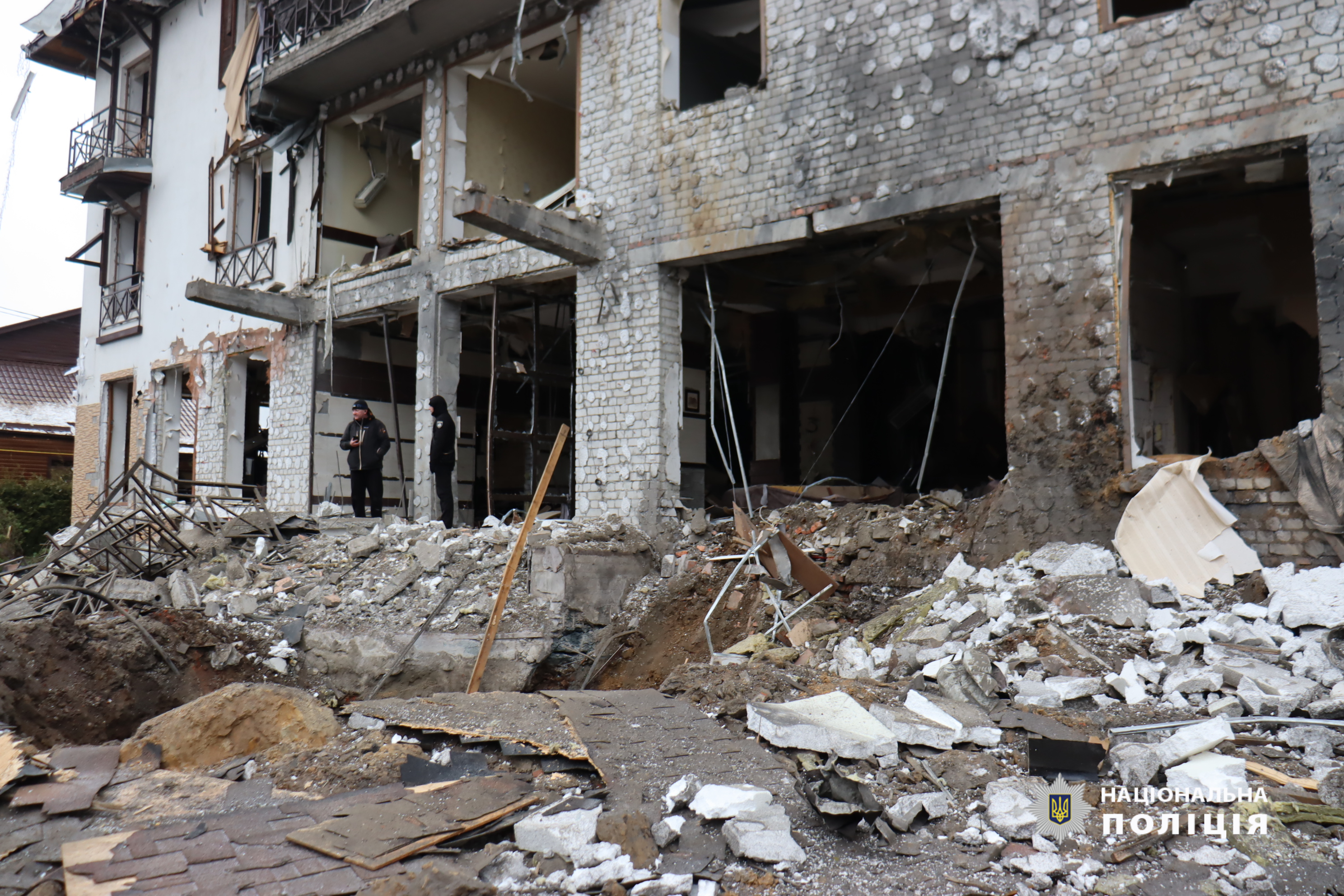
Hotel in Kharkiv after the attack

One person was killed in a Russian airstrike in Kharkiv Oblast. Thirteen people, including several Turkish journalists, were injured in a Russian missile attack on a hotel in Kharkiv city.

=== 11 January ===
Russia claimed to have shot down three drones over Rostov, Tula and Kaluga Oblasts.

Turkey, Romania and Bulgaria signed an agreement establishing a Mine Countermeasures Task Group to deal with Russian naval mines affecting shipping in the Black Sea.

A US Department of Defense Office of Inspector General report revealed that the Pentagon was unable to quickly or fully account for over $1 billion worth of weapons aid to Ukraine, with US officials and diplomats failing to properly monitor 39,139 high-value weapons and devices intended to reach front line Ukrainian units. No evidence of theft or diversion of weaponry was presented in the report, as such investigation was beyond the scope of the inspector general's examination.

US National Security official John Kirby said that the US had run out of funding for military aid to Ukraine.

The Verkhovna Rada refused to debate legislation regarding an extension of mobilisation which would have reduced the age of conscription from 27 to 25 and increased penalties for draft evaders. The proposal was rejected on the basis that parts of it "directly violate human rights". The bill was returned to President Zelenskyy for further amendments.

During President Zelenskyy's visit to Latvia, his counterpart Edgars Rinkevics announced a new military aid package to Ukraine that would include howitzers, 155 mm ammunition, anti-tank weapons, rockets, grenades, helicopters, drones, communication devices, and generators.

=== 12 January ===
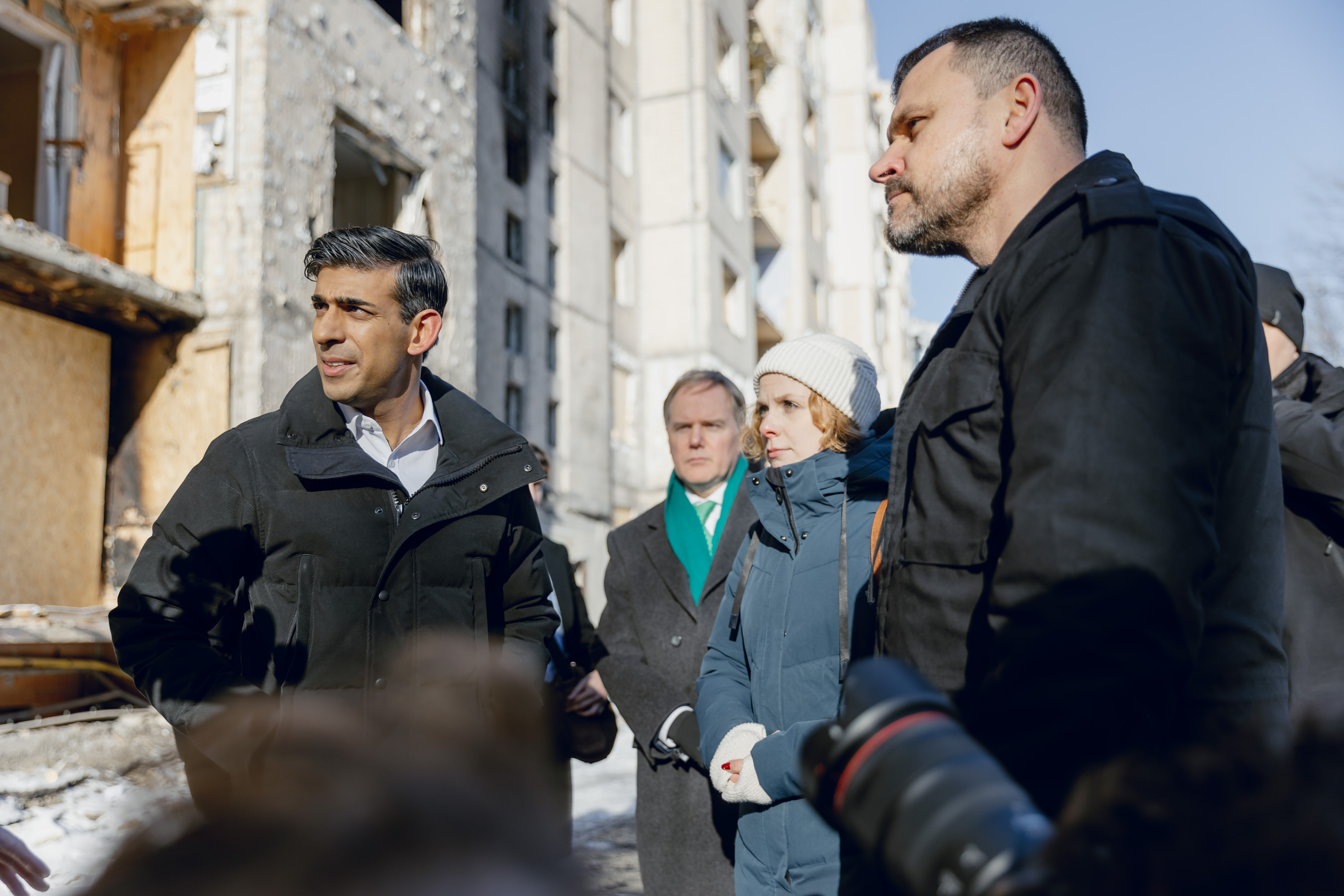
British Prime Minister Rishi Sunak and Ukrainian Interior Minister Ihor Klymenko inspect a residential building in Kyiv, damaged by 2 January Russian strike

Two people were killed by Russian shelling in Kherson. In Horlivka, two people were claimed to have been killed and six others injured by a Ukrainian drone strike on an ambulance transporting victims of an earlier Ukrainian attack in Holmivskyi that killed two people.

British Prime Minister Rishi Sunak visited Kyiv and announced a new £2.5 billion aid package for Ukraine earmarked for the manufacture and purchase of drones, munitions, maritime security and humanitarian aid.

A Russian tank brigade lieutenant was sentenced in absentia by a Ukrainian court to life imprisonment for the killing of two civilians in Mriia during the Battle of Kyiv in 2022.

The NACP added the sandwich chain Subway to its list of international war sponsors for continuing to operate in Russia.

The SBU filed charges against Vasyl Povorozniuk, metropolitan of the Luhansk Diocese of the Ukrainian Orthodox Church (Moscow Patriarchate) (UOC-MP), for collaborating with Russia.

Russia issued an arrest warrant for former vice president of Gazprombank, Igor Volobuyev, for being a "foreign agent", having fled to Ukraine after the 2022 invasion and joining the Kyiv-backed Freedom of Russia Legion.

=== 13 January ===
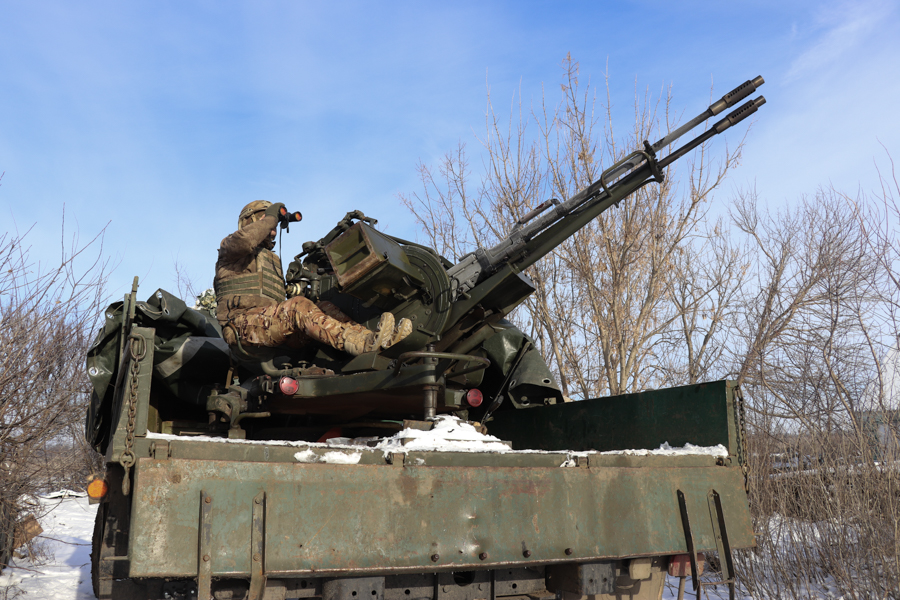
Mobile fire team of National Guard of Ukraine hunts for Russian drones in Zaporizhzhia Oblast

Russia launched 37 missiles and three drones across Ukraine, of which Ukrainian air defenses intercepted eight missiles. Another 20 missiles were brought down by malfunctions or "Ukrainian electronic warfare systems". One person was injured in Sumy Oblast.

French Foreign Minister Stéphane Séjourné visited Kyiv, during which he encouraged French defence firms to invest in Ukraine.

=== 14 January ===
The Ukrainian military claimed to have shot down a Russian Beriev A-50 AWACS aircraft and damaged an Ilyushin Il-22 over the Sea of Azov. The former had a crew of 15 people, and the latter with 10. According to Ukraine, Russia had had only three A-50s and six modernized A-50Us in service, which was confirmed by the UK Defence Intelligence together with the crash of the A-50 aircraft.

In Melitopol, a vehicle carrying four Russian soldiers was claimed to have been blown up by partisans.

The Swedish government and the Norwegian company Nammo signed an agreement to increase production of 155 mm artillery ammunition to Ukraine while also boosting Swedish stocks.

=== 15 January ===
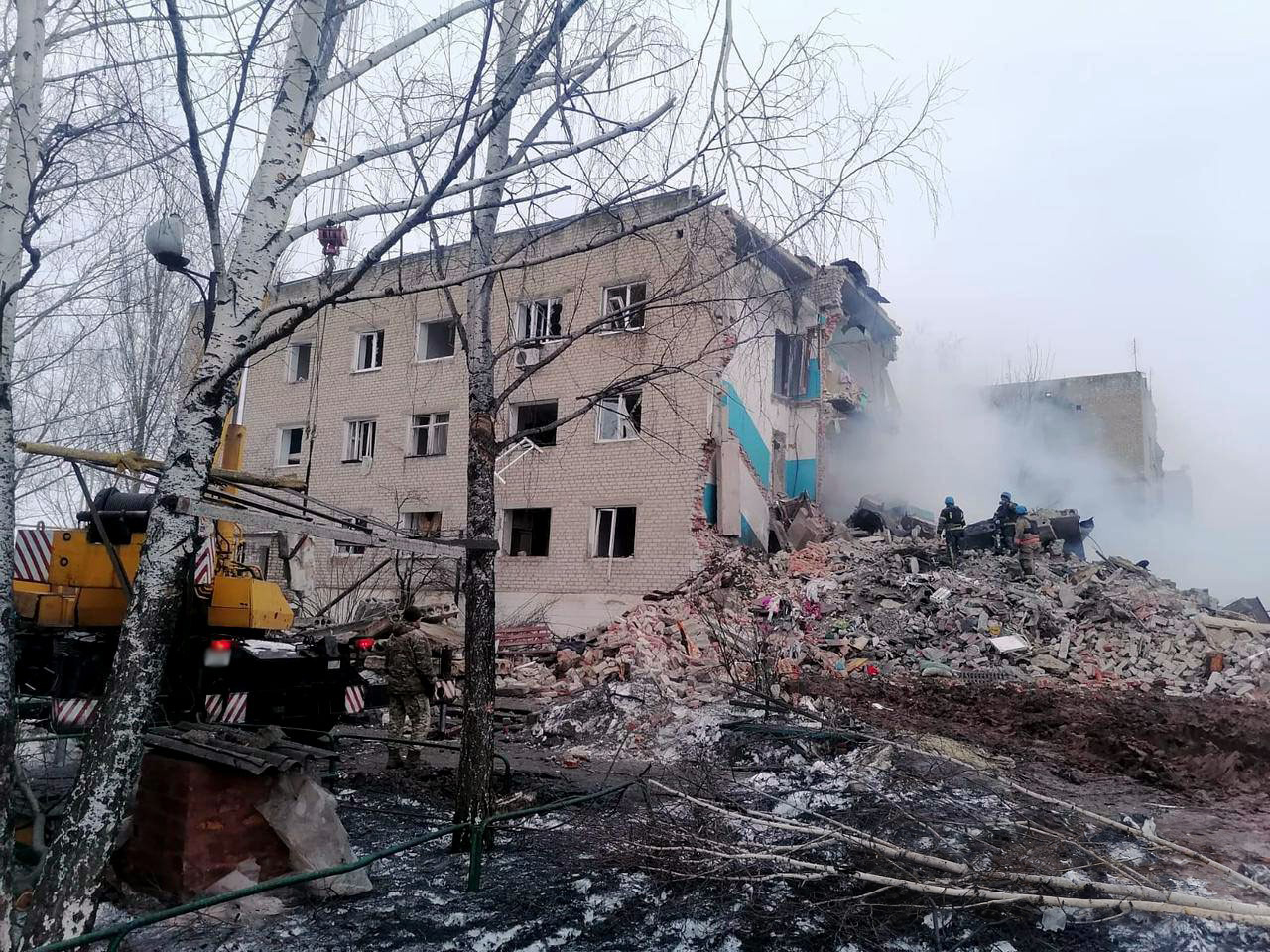
Destroyed house in New York

Five people were killed in a Russian missile strike on a house in New York, Donetsk Oblast, with the bodies only being recovered on 27 January. One person was killed by Russian shelling in Krasnohorivka, Donetsk Oblast.

Ukrainian journalist Yuriy Nikolov claimed that unknown intruders tried to break down his front door and demanded that he join the army two weeks after he had criticized President Zelenskyy's leadership due to his unwillingness to accept "bad news", during which he compared him to a "draft-dodger".

=== 16 January ===
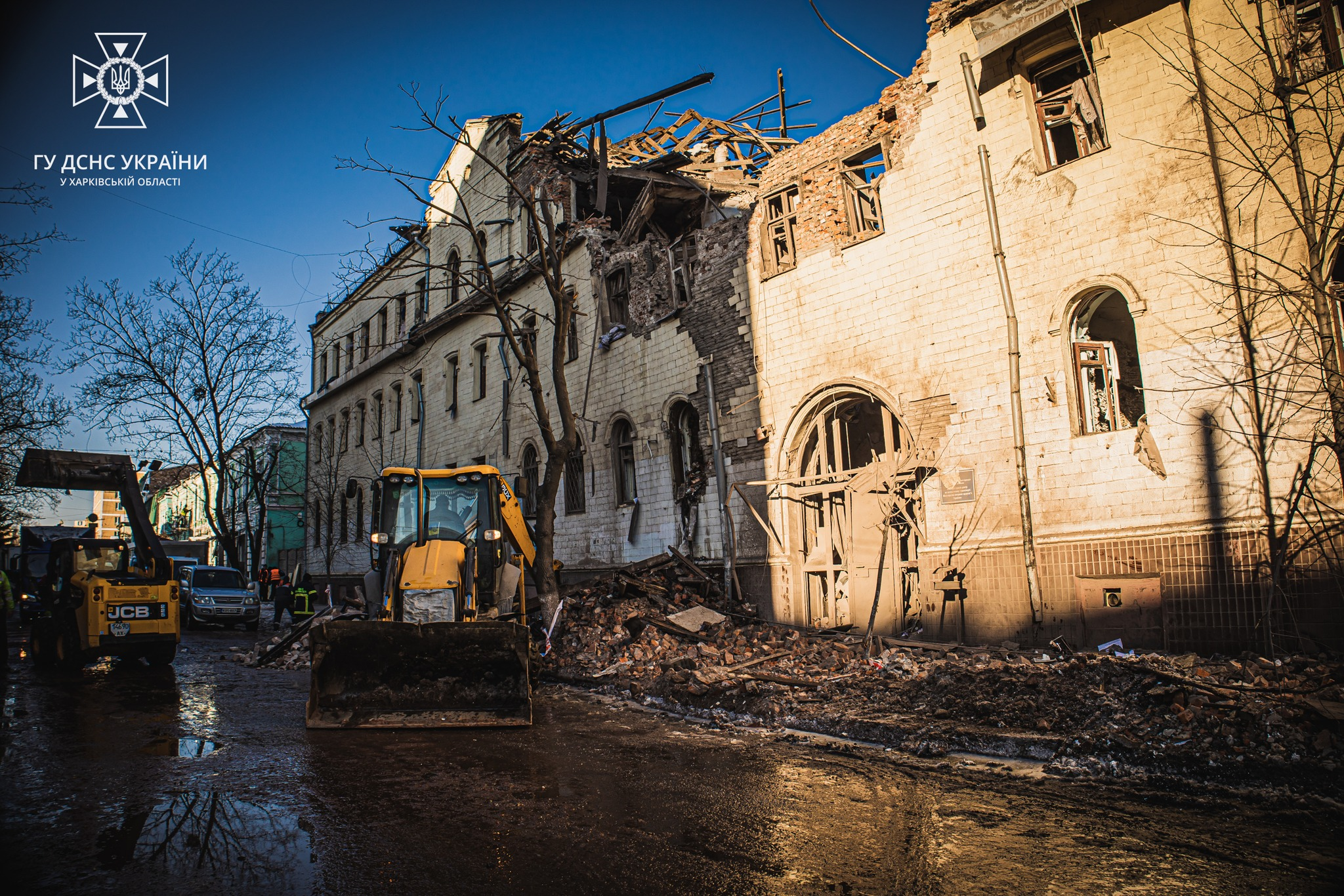
Medical building in Kharkiv, destroyed by the strike on 16 January

Russia claimed to have shot down five drones over Voronezh, during which two children were injured. Explosions were reported near an airbase.

Ukrainian authorities ordered the evacuation of over two dozen villages in Kupiansk Raion, Kharkiv Oblast, due to "worsening" Russian attacks.

The Verkhovna Rada passed a law creating an electronic registry of potential conscripts for mobilization purposes.

French President Emmanuel Macron announced that his government would deliver some 40 SCALP missiles and "several hundred bombs" in the next few weeks and sign a bilateral security agreement with Ukraine.

Polish truckers who had been blocking three border crossings with Ukraine suspended their actions until March following an agreement with the Polish government.

Seventeen people were injured, two seriously, after two S-300 missiles hit residential buildings in Kharkiv; ten residential buildings were damaged as well, according to regional governor Oleh Syniehubov.

=== 17 January ===
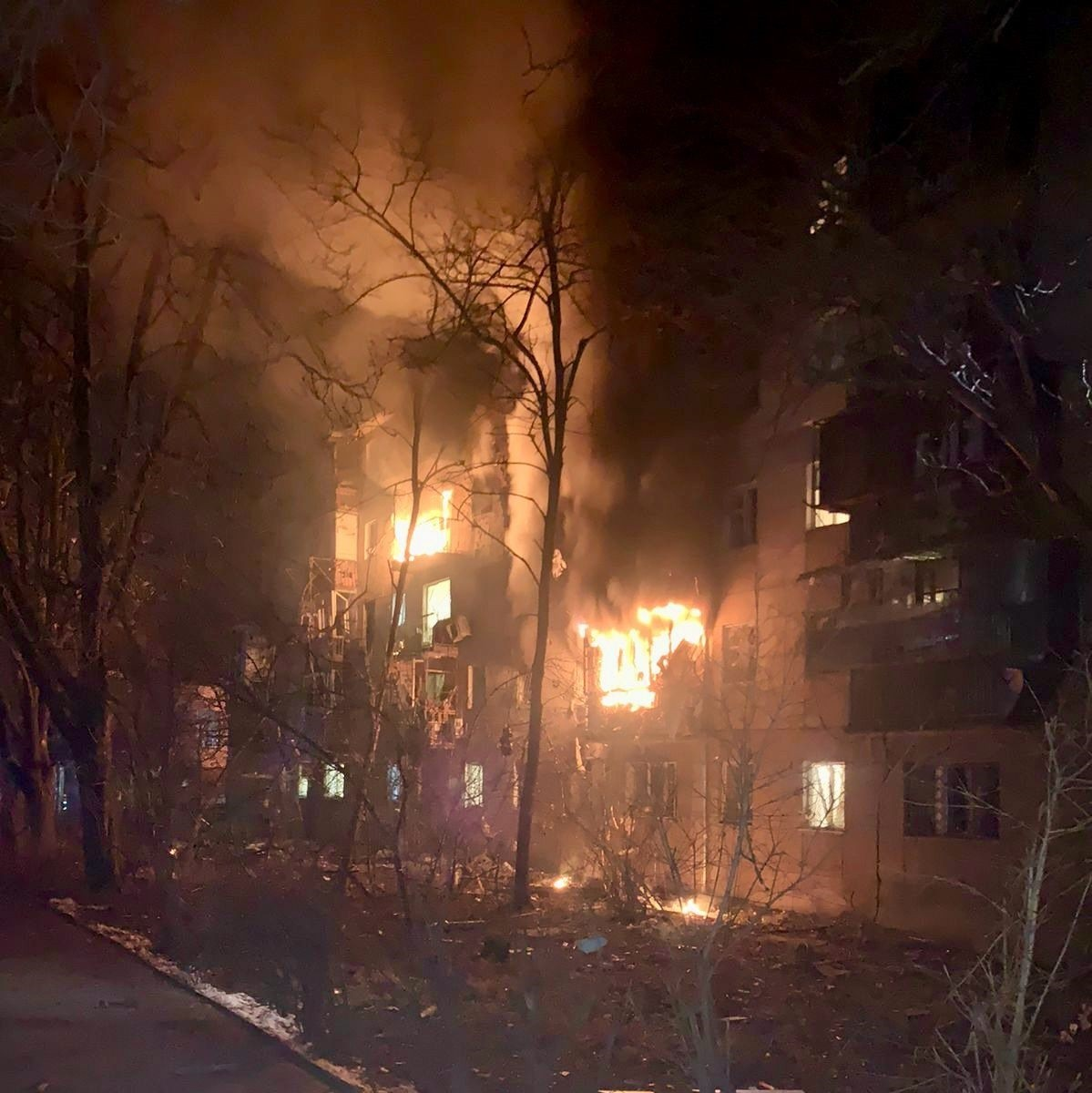
Residential building in Odesa damaged by the 17 January attack

Ukraine claimed to have shot down 19 out of 20 drones near Odesa. Three people were injured. Residential buildings, cars and a gas pipe were also damaged.

Three people, including a 13-year-old girl, were killed by Russian shelling in Kherson and Kharkiv Oblasts.

Russian forces claimed to have shot down seven Vilkha missiles and four drones over Belgorod Oblast, as well as another drone over Moscow Oblast.

Germany announced a new military aid package of some €7 billion for Ukraine that would include ammunition for Leopard 1 tanks, drones and communication equipment. However, the Bundestag voted down a motion to send Taurus cruise missiles to Ukraine.

Ukrainian defence minister Rustem Umerov cancelled a scheduled visit to France on 18 January due to "security reasons", according to the French Ministry of Armed Forces.

=== 18 January ===
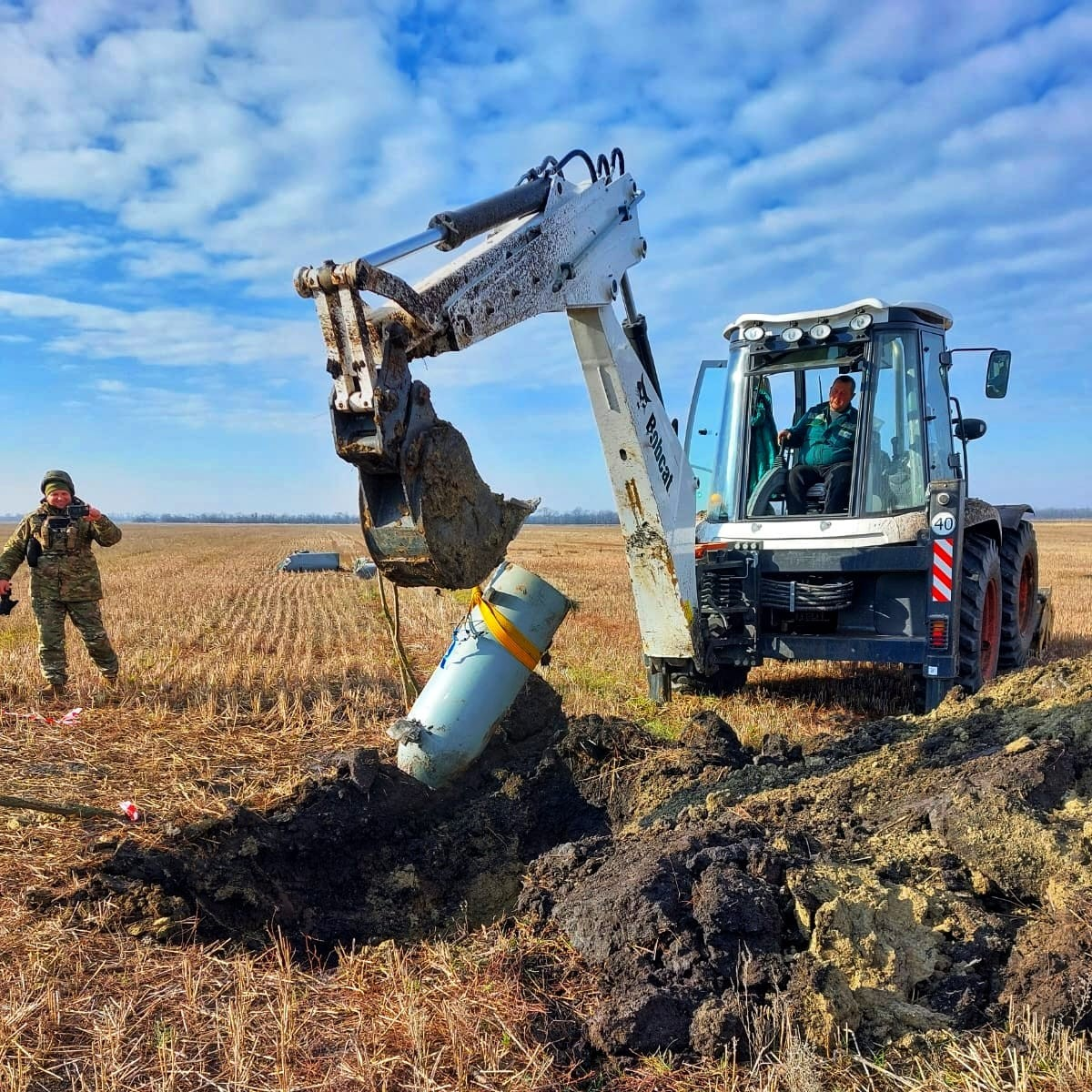
Disposal of the warhead of a Russian missile Kh-101 in Kherson Oblast

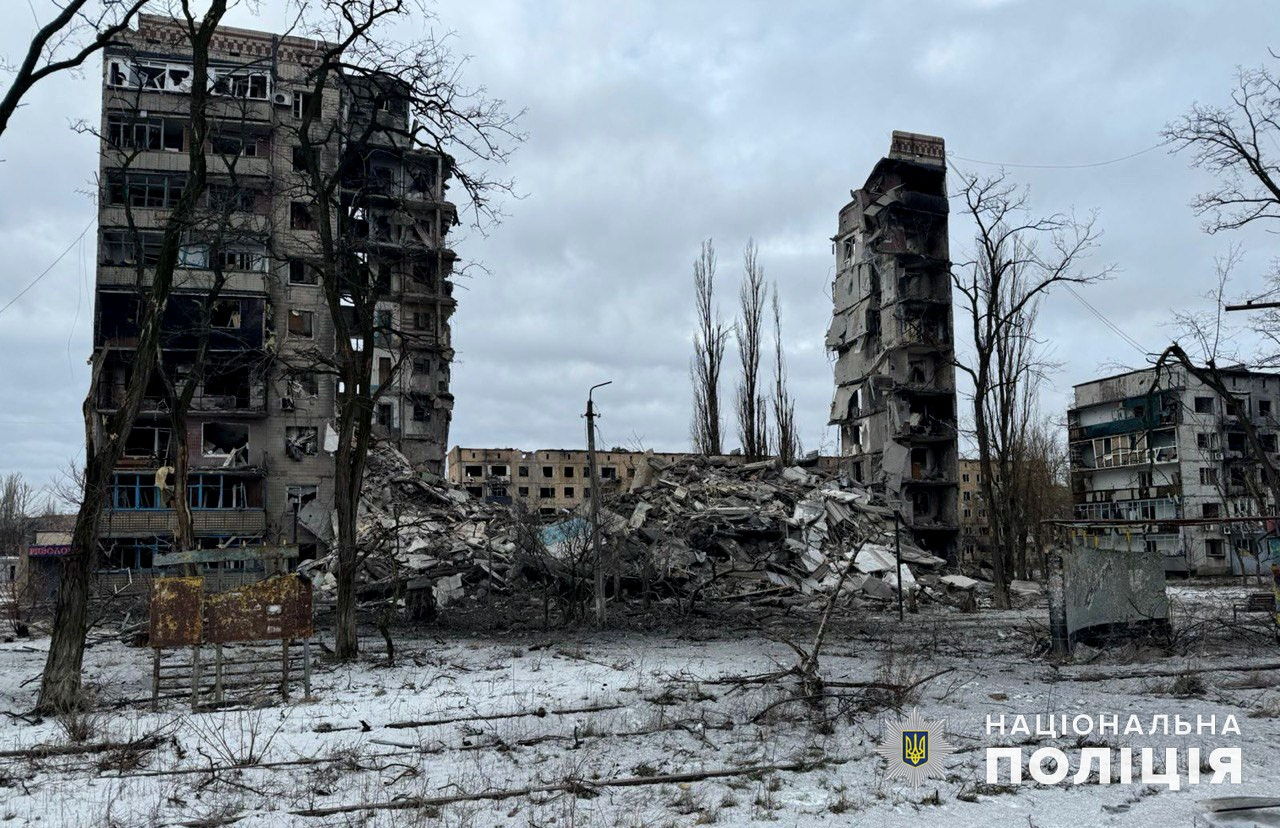
Remains of a residential building in Avdiivka

Russia claimed that it had taken the village of Vesele in Donetsk Oblast, 20 square kilometres (7.7 sq mi) northeast of Bakhmut.

Russian officials claimed that a drone was shot down over Vasilevsky Island in Saint Petersburg, in the first occurrence of its kind since the invasion began. A fire was reported near the St. Petersburg Oil Terminal after three kilograms of high explosives detonated, burning an area of some 130 square metres. A drone also flew over one of Putin's official residences in Valday, Novgorod Oblast, while another was shot down over Moscow.

One person was killed by Russian shelling in Kupiansk.

Australia declined a request from Ukraine to acquire 45 retired Taipan helicopters, citing their unworthiness for flying and massive repair costs.

The US imposed sanctions on the shipping firm Hennesea Holdings Limited for violating the price cap on Russian oil imposed following the 2022 invasion.

French Armed Forces Minister Sébastien Lecornu announced more aid for Ukraine, including a plan to train 7,000–9,000 Ukrainian soldiers along with a "artillery coalition" of 23 nations to produce more artillery for Ukraine. France also pledged 12 CAESAR self-propelled howitzers in total, and 50 AASM Hammer bombs per month, and increase the number of shells delivered to Ukraine from 2000 per month to 3000.

Ukraine released video of what it claimed to be a jet-powered kamikaze drone during a test flight.

=== 19 January ===
In Russia, a Ukrainian drone strike caused a fire that affected four reservoirs at an oil depot in Klintsy. TASS reported that the fire covered an area of some 1,000 square metres. Another drone was reported to have struck a gunpowder factory in Tambov.

One person was killed by Russian shelling in Kherson.

IAEA head Rafael Grossi said that monitors had discovered mines in a buffer zone between the external and internal fences of the Zaporizhzhia Nuclear Power Plant that had previously been removed in November 2023.

=== 20 January ===
Ukraine placed Communist Party of Ukraine leader Petro Symonenko, who fled to Russia after the 2022 invasion, on its wanted list for calling for the overthrow of the government and justifying Russian aggression.

=== 21 January ===
A Ukrainian drone attack caused an explosion at a natural gas terminal belonging to Novatek at Ust-Luga, Leningrad Oblast. Russian authorities said there were no casualties but two storage facilities and a pumping station were damaged. Drone attacks were also reported at the Shcheglovskiy Val plant in Tula, which produces Pantsir missile systems, the Smolensk Aviation Plant, and in Oryol Oblast. Russian officials also claimed that two Ukrainian missiles and another projectile were shot down over Crimea.

Russian-installed officials in Donetsk claimed that a Ukrainian missile attack on a market in the suburb of Tekstilshchik killed 27 and wounded 25. The Tavria army group of the Ukrainian military denied responsibility.

One person was killed by Russian shelling in Kurakhove.

The Ukrainian military confirmed the capture of the village of Krokhmalne, 30 kilometres southeast of Kupiansk, by Russian forces, while claiming that the latter had lost at least 7,055 soldiers in the attempt.

=== 22 January ===
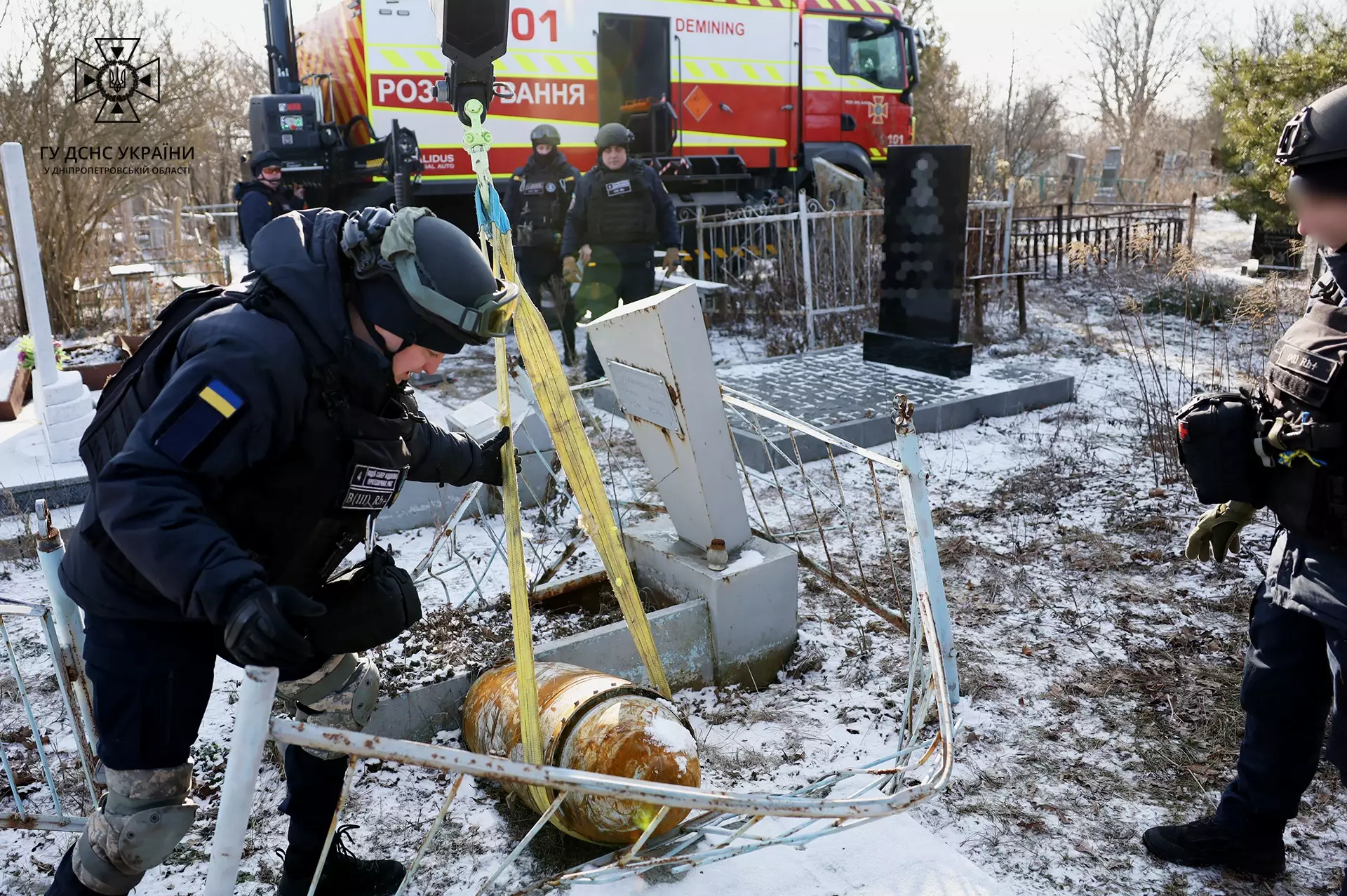
Removing of Kh-59 missile warhead which fell on a cemetery in Dnipropetrovsk Oblast

Three people were killed by Russian shelling in Donetsk, Kharkiv and Kherson Oblasts.

Polish Prime Minister Donald Tusk visited Kyiv to discuss a new aid package for Ukraine focused on making "ammunition and military equipment".

On Unity Day, President Zelenskyy signed a decree recognizing the regions of Kuban, Starodubshchyna and Slobozhanshchyna in Russia as historically inhabited by Ukrainians. The decree also required the Ukrainian government to create plans "to preserve the national identity of Ukrainians" in those areas. However, it did not establish any territorial demands on Russia. Zelenskyy also proposed a law allowing dual citizenship with other nationalities except with Russia.

=== 23 January ===
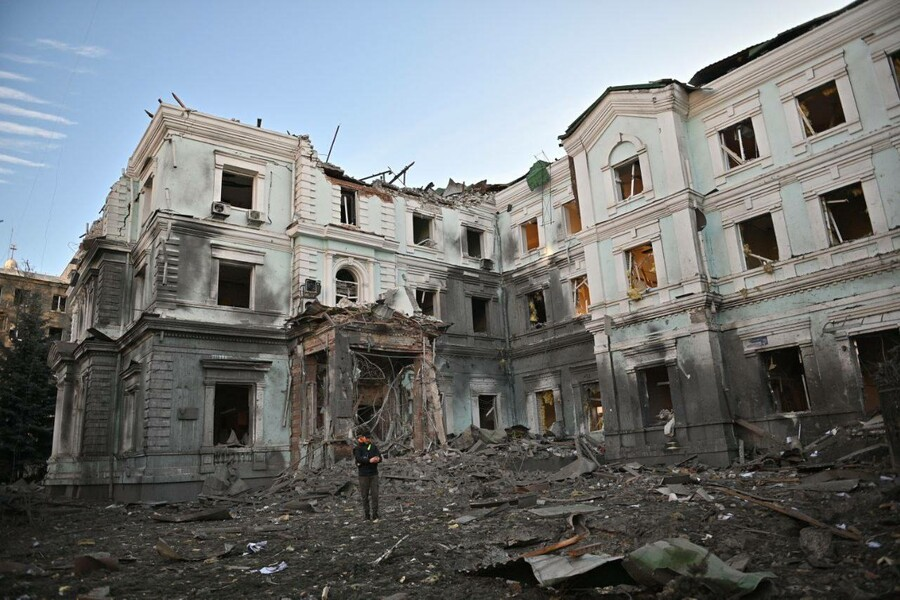
Building of the National Academy of Legal Sciences of Ukraine in Kharkiv housed in a 19th-century merchant's manor after the strike

Russia launched a series of missile strikes across Ukraine, killing at least 18 people and injuring 130 others according to President Zelenskyy. Ukrainian forces claimed to have intercepted 21 of 42 missiles launched. Eleven people and two dogs were killed and at least 57 others were injured in Kharkiv. One person was killed in Pavlohrad while at least 22 others were injured in Kyiv. Four people were killed in Kherson Oblast.

Hackers from the Ukrainian group BO Team launched a cyberattack on the Russian Far Eastern Research Center of Space Hydrometeorology "Planeta" based in Khabarovsk, destroying 280 servers and two petabytes of data that were used by multiple Russian government agencies, as well as a digital array valued at $10 million, the software of the facility's supercomputers. The cyberattack also reportedly disabled the facility's air conditioning, humidification, and emergency power supply systems, and rendered a strategic station on Bolshevik Island in the Russian Arctic offline.

NATO announced a 1.1 billion euro ($1.2 billion) deal to purchase 220,000 155 mm artillery shells for replenishing depleted stocks and supporting Ukraine.

=== 24 January ===
A Russian Il-76 transport aircraft carrying 74 people was reported have crashed in Yablonovo, Belgorod Oblast, killing everyone on board, including 65 Ukrainian POWs according to Russian officials. The Ukrainian military claimed the aircraft was transporting S-300 missiles. A spokesperson for the HUR confirmed a prisoner swap was due to happen on 24 January but did not proceed, adding that it was checking if Ukrainian POWs were on board the aircraft. It later released another statement where it accused Russian forces of failing to advise them to keep the airspace clear. The BBC considered this statement a "tacit acknowledgement" that Ukraine shot down the aircraft.

The mayor of Avdiivka said that Russian forces had managed to enter the southern part of the city for the first time but were forced out by Ukrainian forces. A Russian rocket strike in nearby Hirnyk killed two people.

Russia claimed to have shot down seven drones over Oryol, Bryansk and Belgorod Oblasts.

Germany announced that it would deliver six decommissioned Westland Sea King Mk. 41s in its first transfer of helicopters to Ukraine. Canada announced a military aid package of $20 million including 10 rigid inflatable boats manufactured by Zodiac Hurricane Technologies, and English language training for F-16 pilots.

=== 25 January ===
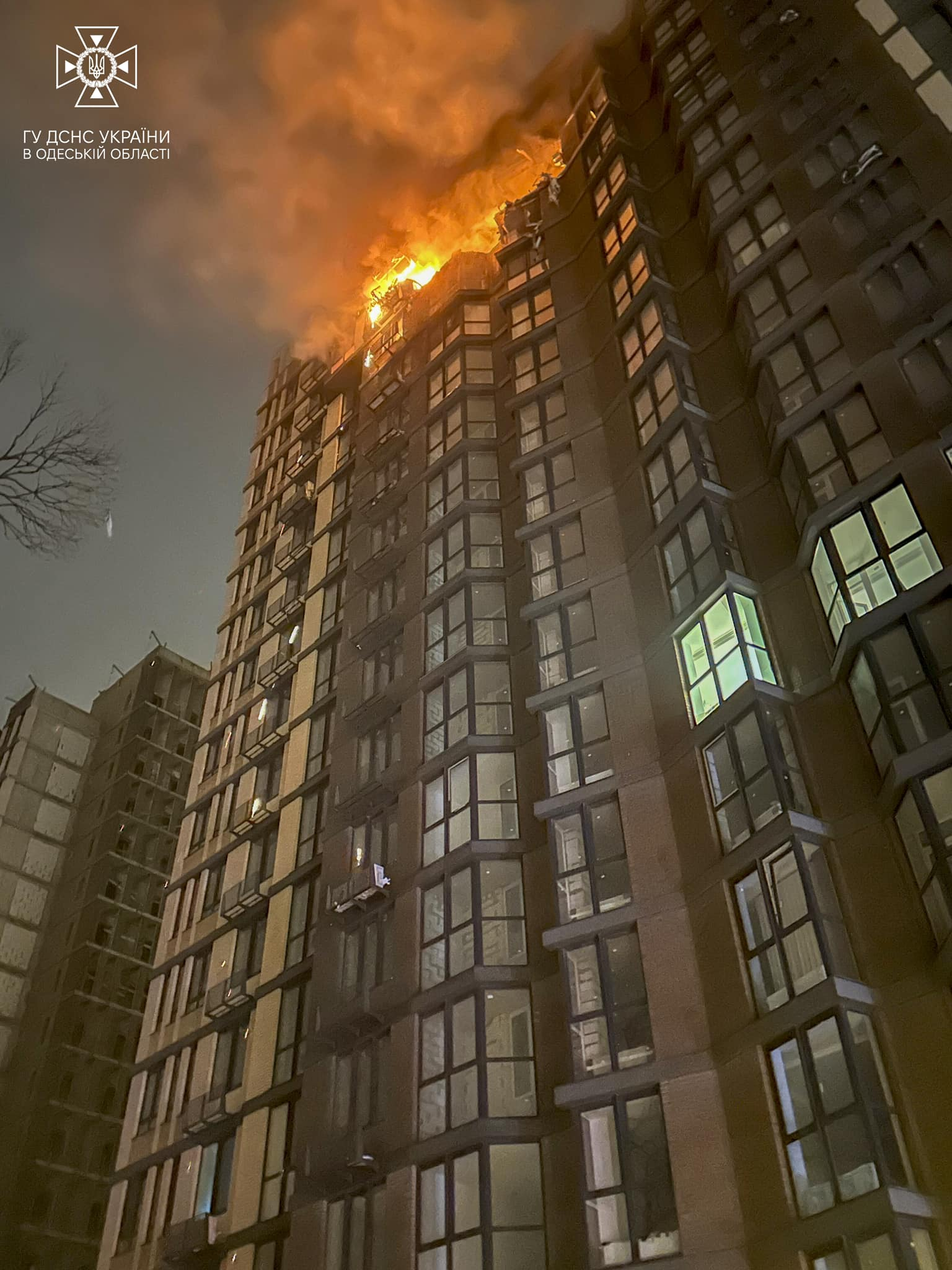
Damaged residential building in Odesa

According to Ukraine, Russia launched 14 drones and five missiles in the south of the country. 11 drones were shot down, injuring two people in Odesa. Residential and industrial buildings in the city were also damaged.

In Russia, an oil depot in Tuapse, Krasnodar Krai, caught fire. Locals reported multiple drones in the air before and after the fire. The fire was localised without causing casualties.

BBC News Russian reported that Russia had phased out its practice of granting presidential pardons to prisoners who agreed to fight in Ukraine and was instead offering them conditional release and sending them to the front until the war ends, citing testimonies from fighters and their relatives.

A court in Moscow convicted Donbas separatist commander Igor Girkin aka Strelkov, of extremism and sentenced him to four years' imprisonment for calling Putin a "coward" over his conduct of the war in Ukraine. A Saint Petersburg court sentenced Darya Trepova to 27 years' imprisonment for her involvement in a bombing that killed pro-war milblogger Vladlen Tatarsky and wounded 42 others in 2023 and which Russia claimed was orchestrated by Ukrainian intelligence.

=== 26 January ===
France delivered two LRU rocket launchers to Ukraine.

=== 27 January ===
The ISW, citing Russian milbloggers, reported that the Russian military had taken the village of Tabaivka, 20 kilometers southeast of Kupiansk, which was denied by Ukraine.

Ukrainian authorities claimed that two siblings were fatally shot by a Russian sabotage group that had infiltrated a village in Khotin, Sumy Oblast. One person was killed by a drone strike in Beryslav.

The HUR claimed that it had destroyed the "entire IT infrastructure" of the IPL Consulting company, which provides services to the Russian heavy industry and military-industrial complex, in a cyberattack.

The SBU announced that it had uncovered corruption in a weapons purchase by the Ukrainian military worth about 1.5 billion hryvnias ($40 million) that was signed in 2022 but saw none of the promised weapons arrive. It said that five senior officials in the defence ministry and managers of the weapons supplier Lviv Arsenal were under investigation, with one suspect in custody after being apprehended while trying to leave the country.

=== 28 January ===
Greece agreed to transfer air defense missiles and anti-aircraft guns deemed outdated by its military to Ukraine.

The Ukrainian Coordination Headquarters for the Treatment of Prisoners of War suffered a cyberattack by Russian hackers, restricting access to its servers. A statement linked the attack to the crash of the Russian transport aircraft suspected to be carrying Ukrainian POWs on 24 January.

=== 29 January ===
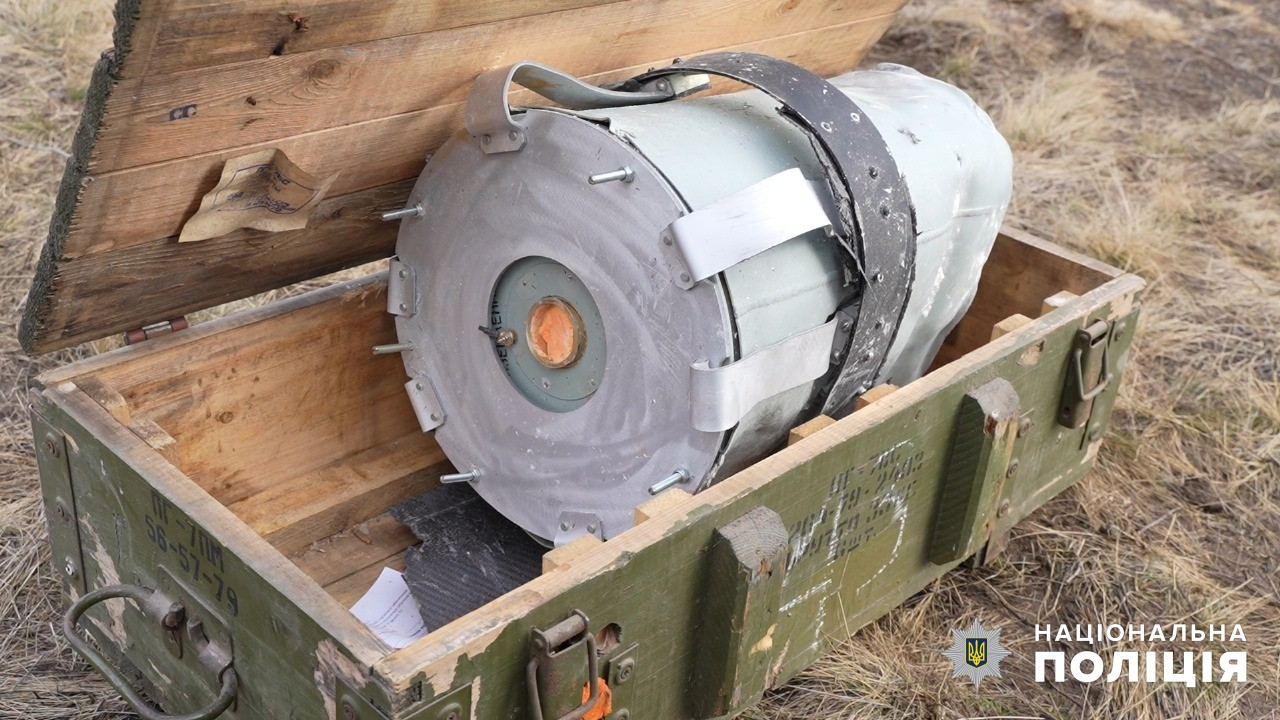
Shahed warhead, found in Odesa Oblast

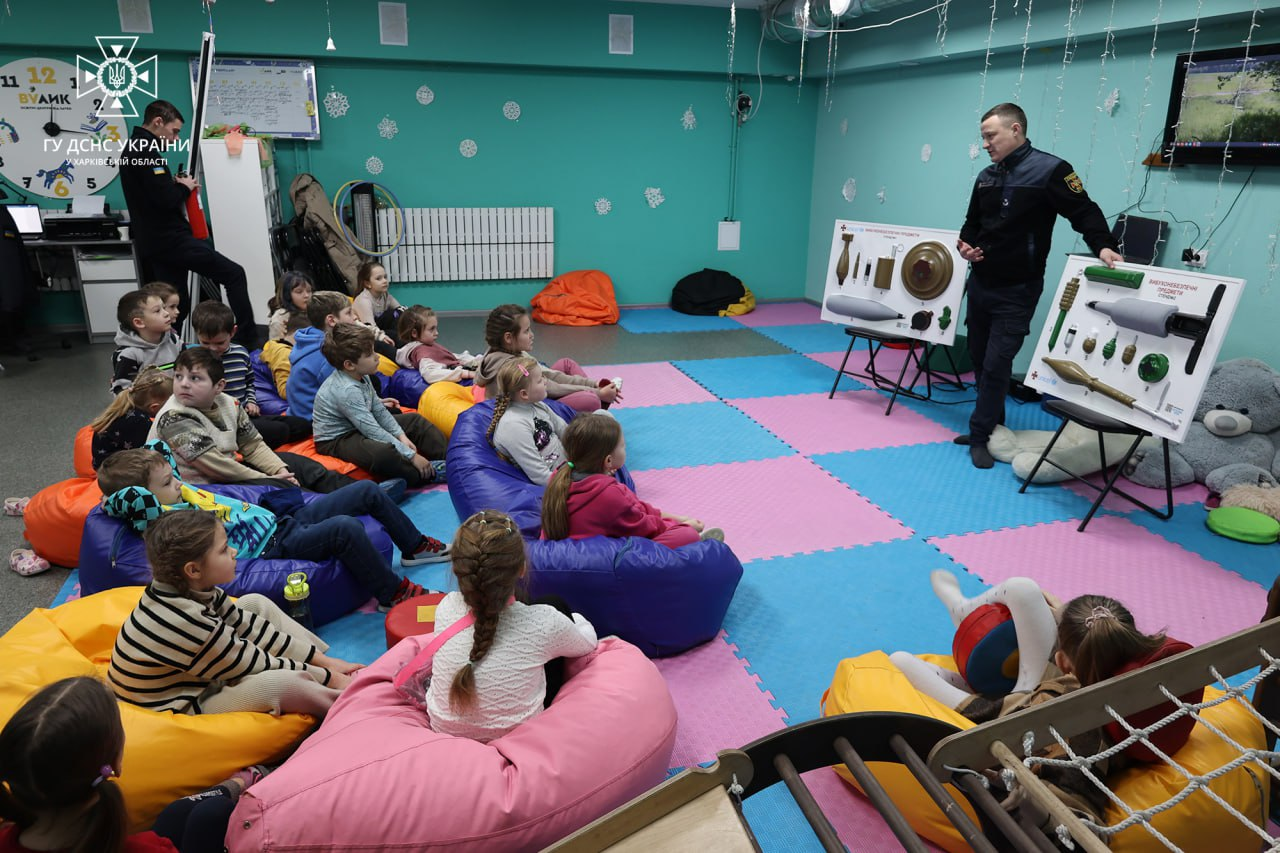
Mine safety lesson in Kharkiv Oblast

Three people were killed by Russian shelling in Znob-Novhorodske, Sumy Oblast. Russian-installed officials claimed that three people were killed by Ukrainian shelling in Donetsk.

A Russian Su-34 fighter jet was reportedly shot down by Ukrainian air defenses over Luhansk Oblast.

In Russia, the governor of Yaroslavl Oblast claimed that a drone was shot down by air defenses near the Yaroslavl Refinery in the first such attack in the region since the war began.

Authorities in Donetsk Oblast ordered the mandatory evacuation of nine frontline villages in the vicinity of Marinka and Ocheretyne due to continued Russian shelling.

A Ukrainian court sentenced a Russian soldier to life imprisonment for illegally detaining three civilians and fatally shooting two of them in Haivoron, Chernihiv Oblast, in 2022.

The Netherlands pledged €122 million ($132 million) to help procure artillery shells to Ukraine and improve the country's cybersecurity.

A largely intact Ukrainian R-360 Neptune washed ashore on the Russian coast of the Sea of Azov.

=== 30 January ===
One person was killed by Russian shelling in Avdiivka. Another person was killed in a Russian drone strike in Beryslav.

35 drones and two missiles were fired by Russian forces across Ukraine. 15 drones were shot down over Mykolaiv, Sumy, Cherkasy, Dnipropetrovsk, Kharkiv, Kherson and Kyiv Oblasts. The Ukrainian Air Force claimed some of the targets were fuel and energy infrastructure.

The Ukrainian military said that it had attacked a Russian radar station in Rozdolne, Crimea. The HUR claimed to have disabled the special communications server of the Russian Defense Ministry in a cyberattack.

Russia claimed to have shot down 21 drones over Crimea and Belgorod, Bryansk, Kaluga, and Tula Oblasts.

The SBU arrested a resident of Kyiv on suspicion of spying for Russia.

Reuters reported that Ukraine had received its first GLSDBs according to sources at Boeing.

=== 31 January ===
The Ukrainian Air Force claimed to have launched a missile strike on Belbek airport in Crimea, damaging three Russian military aircraft. Russian forces claimed to have shot down 20 Storm Shadow missiles, 17 over the Black Sea and three over Crimea.

In Russia, a drone crashed into the grounds of the Nevsky Mazut oil refinery in St. Petersburg, causing an explosion and fire. Another drone was reportedly shot down over Pskov Oblast. Russian media blamed the explosion on a S-400 missile that was fired at a drone but lost control, crashing into the refinery and exploding. All flights from Pulkovo airport were suspended between 3:53 a.m. and 5:11 a.m.

Russia and Ukraine conducted an exchange of POWs, in which 195 Russians and 207 Ukrainians were returned to their home countries. The exchange was brokered by the United Arab Emirates.

Germany delivered a new set of military equipment to Ukraine which included IRIS-T missiles, 24 APCs, four tracked all-terrain armored vehicles, 155mm artillery ammunition, 14 mine plows, three mine-clearing tanks, a naval mine clearance system, and a Satcom surveillance system.

Dmitry Ovsyannikov, a former Russian-installed Governor of Sevastopol, was arrested in London by the UK's National Crime Agency allegedly for "circumventing sanctions" to the value of £65,000.

== February 2024 ==
=== 1 February ===
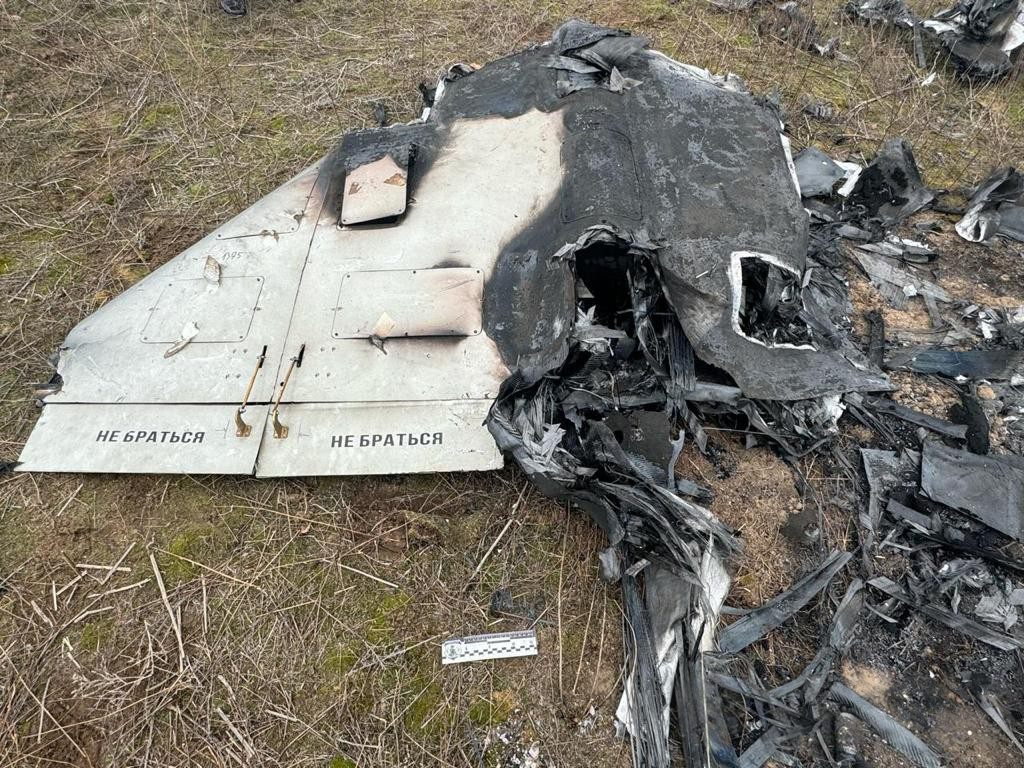
Downed Shahed drone in Mykolaiv Oblast

The HUR claimed that it had sunk the Russian Tarantul-class missile corvette Ivanovets in Lake Donuzlav on the west coast of Crimea using naval drones. Ukrainian sources claimed that the entire crew of 40-50 personnel had been killed, but this could not be confirmed.

Two French nationals working as humanitarian volunteers were killed and five others were injured in a Russian drone strike on Beryslav. Ukrainian authorities subsequently prohibited foreign volunteers, NGOs and diplomatic staff from entering parts of Kherson Oblast without their permission.

Russia claimed to have shot down 11 drones over Belgorod, Kursk and Voronezh Oblasts.

The International Court of Justice (ICJ) issued a verdict on a case filed by Ukraine against Russia, refusing to rule on the shooting down of MH17 and rejecting Ukrainian claims for reparations from Russia. However, it found that Russia repressed the rights of ethnic minorities in Crimea after it unilaterally annexed the peninsula in 2014, failed to support the teaching of the Ukrainian language and offered "monetary and financial support" to separatists in eastern Ukraine.

EU leaders unanimously agreed to extend 50 billion euros ($54 billion) in aid to support Ukraine's economy.

=== 2 February ===
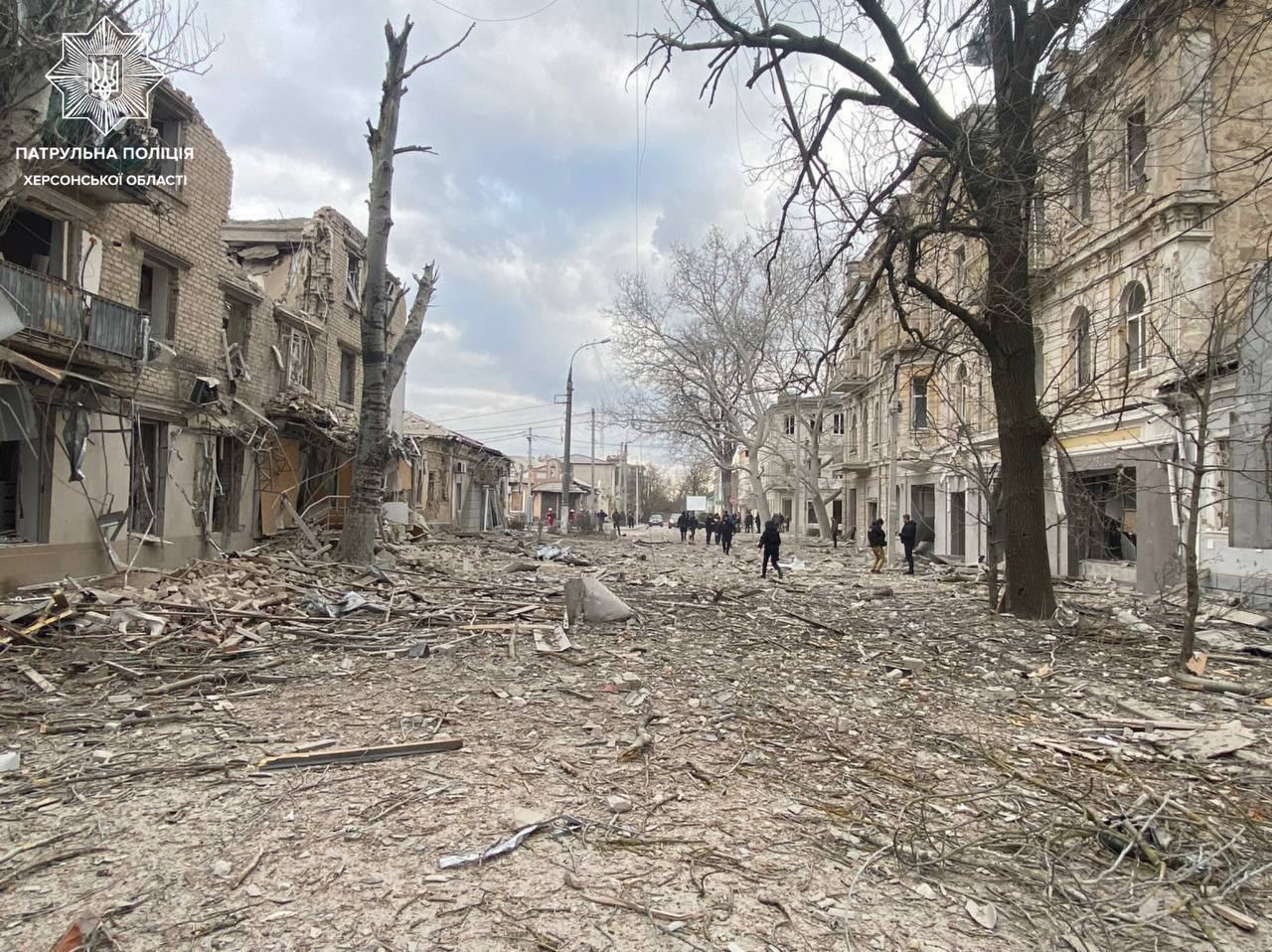
Street in Kherson after bomb strike on the city center on 2 February

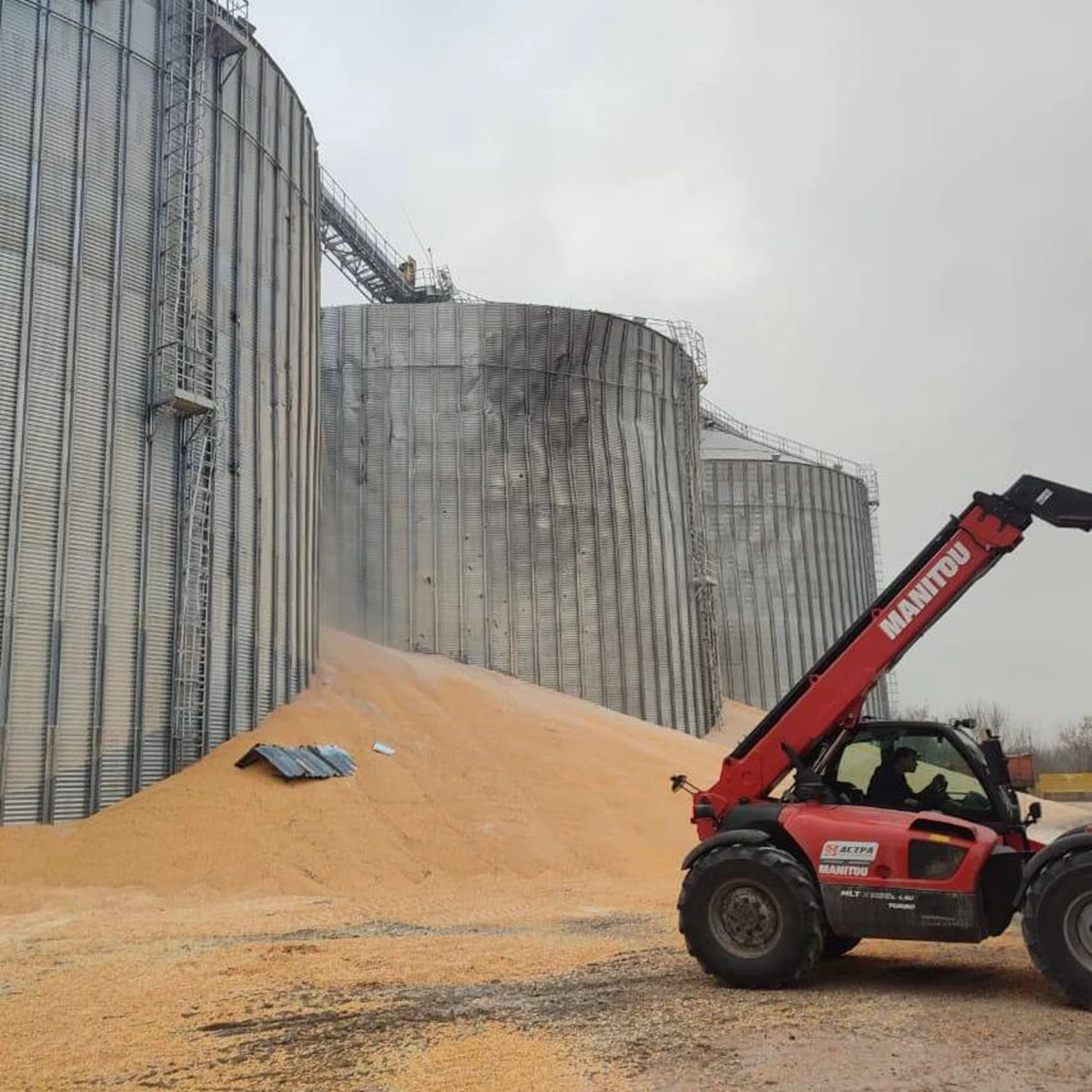
Granary in Poltava Oblast after Russian attack on 2 February

Russian drone attacks cut power to 40,000 civilians in central Ukraine and trapped miners in Kryvyi Rih underground. 24 drones attacked energy infrastructure, 11 were shot down and seven failed to reach their targets.

The Ukrainian Culture Ministry reported that the Cossack-era historical monument of Kamianska Sich in Kherson Oblast was damaged in a Russian attack, with three recorded hits on the site itself, an 18th-century Cossack cemetery and a site near the grave of Kish otaman Kost Hordiienko.

The ICJ ruled that it would proceed with a case brought by Ukraine against Russia over the veracity of the latter's invocation of the 1948 Genocide Convention in launching its invasion in 2022, but declined to rule on whether the invasion itself was a violation of the said convention.

=== 3 February ===
Russia accused Ukraine of striking a bakery in occupied Lysychansk, Luhansk Oblast, using a HIMARS system, killing 28 people, including the regional emergencies minister Aleksey Poteleshchenko, and a child.

In Russia, an oil refinery in Volgograd Oblast operated by Lukoil was set on fire by Ukrainian drone attack. The regional governor, Andrey Bocharov, blamed the fire on falling drone debris, claiming that all drones were shot down or jammed. The fire was brought under control without anyone being injured. The Russian military claimed that four drones in Belgorod Oblast, two in Volgograd and one in Rostov-on-Don were intercepted by electronic warfare systems.

Oleg Stegachev, a Russian Tu-95 crew commander at Engels air base, was shot. Ukrainian intelligence was blamed, his condition is unknown.

Estonia delivered a military aid package to Ukraine valued at 80 million euros ($88 million) that included Javelin missiles and other weapons, ammunition, vehicles and diving equipment.

=== 4 February ===
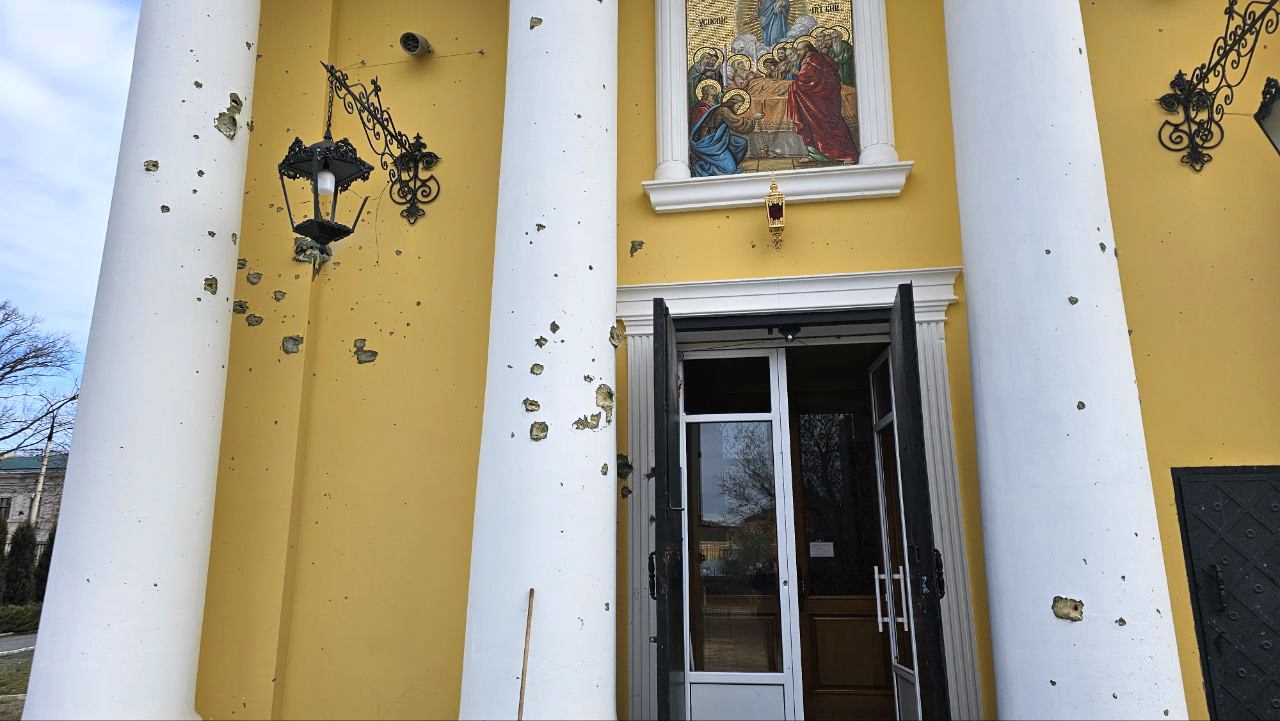
Dormition Cathedral in Kherson, damaged by Russian shelling on 4 February

One person was killed by Russian shelling in Donetsk Oblast.

President Zelenskyy visited Ukrainian positions near Robotyne. He also announced the appointment of Ivan Fedorov, the exiled mayor of Melitopol, as governor of Zaporizhzhia Oblast.

In Russia, the governor of Belgorod Oblast claimed that two border villages were subjected to cross-border attacks by Ukraine.

=== 5 February ===
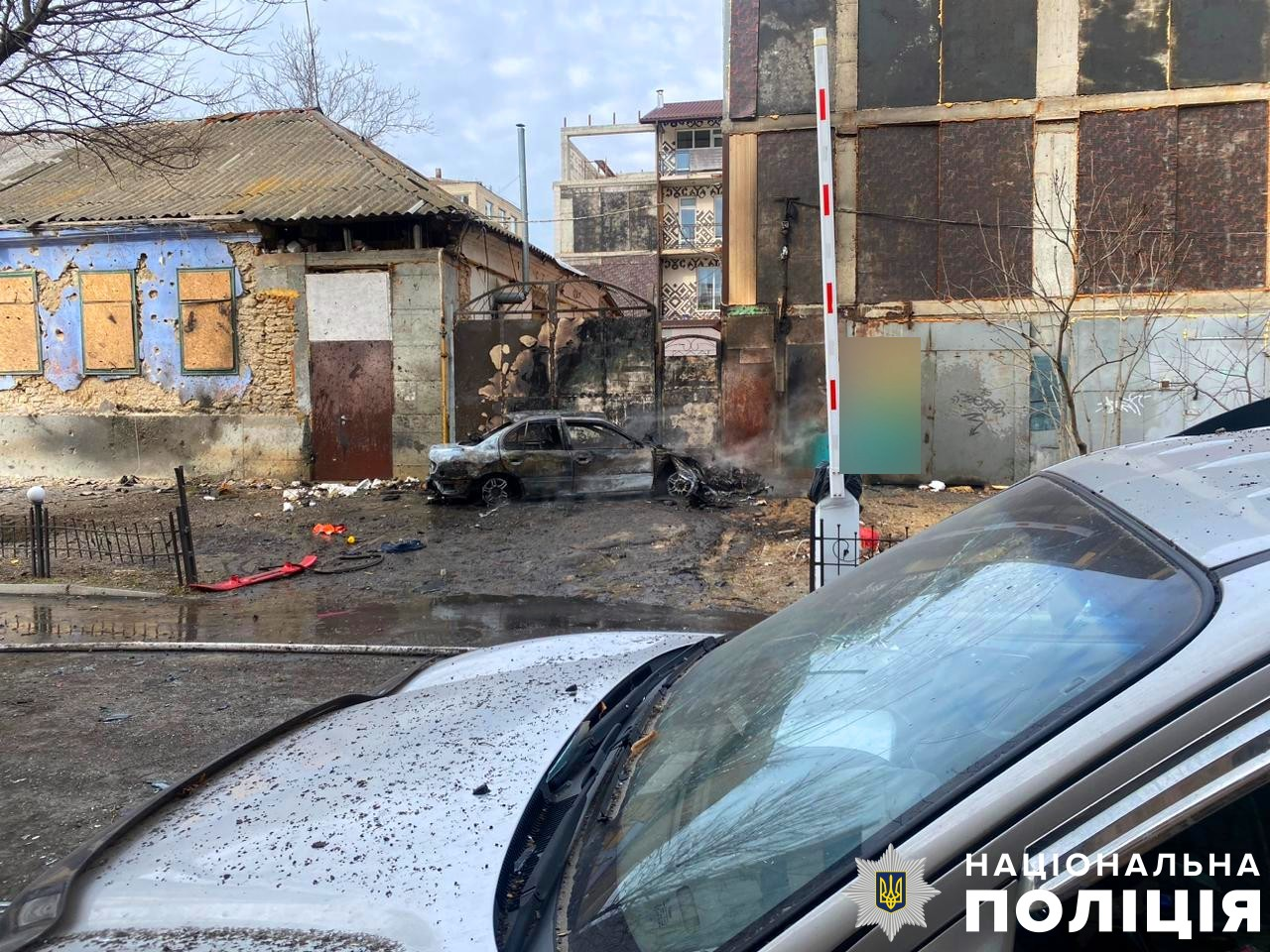
Destructions in Kherson, 5 February

Four people were killed by Russian shelling in Kherson. One person was killed in a Russian rocket attack in Sumy Oblast.

The SBU arrested five people on suspicion of being part of a Russian spy network in Odesa, Zaporizhzhia, and Donetsk Oblasts.

Ukrainian Minister of Veterans Affairs Yulia Laputina submitted her resignation to the Verkhovna Rada without specifying a reason.

In Russia, the governor of Bryansk Oblast claimed that two drones were shot down by air defenses.

The Netherlands pledged to send six more F-16s to Ukraine. Ukrainian commander Lieutenant General Serhii Naiev said that Ukrainian F-16s would be equipped with (300–500 kilometres (190–310 mi)) range air-launched cruise missiles.

The State Security Service of Georgia claimed to have intercepted explosives from Ukraine that were being transported to Russia to use for an attack on Voronezh and said that a Ukrainian citizen of Georgian origin was behind the plot.

=== 6 February ===
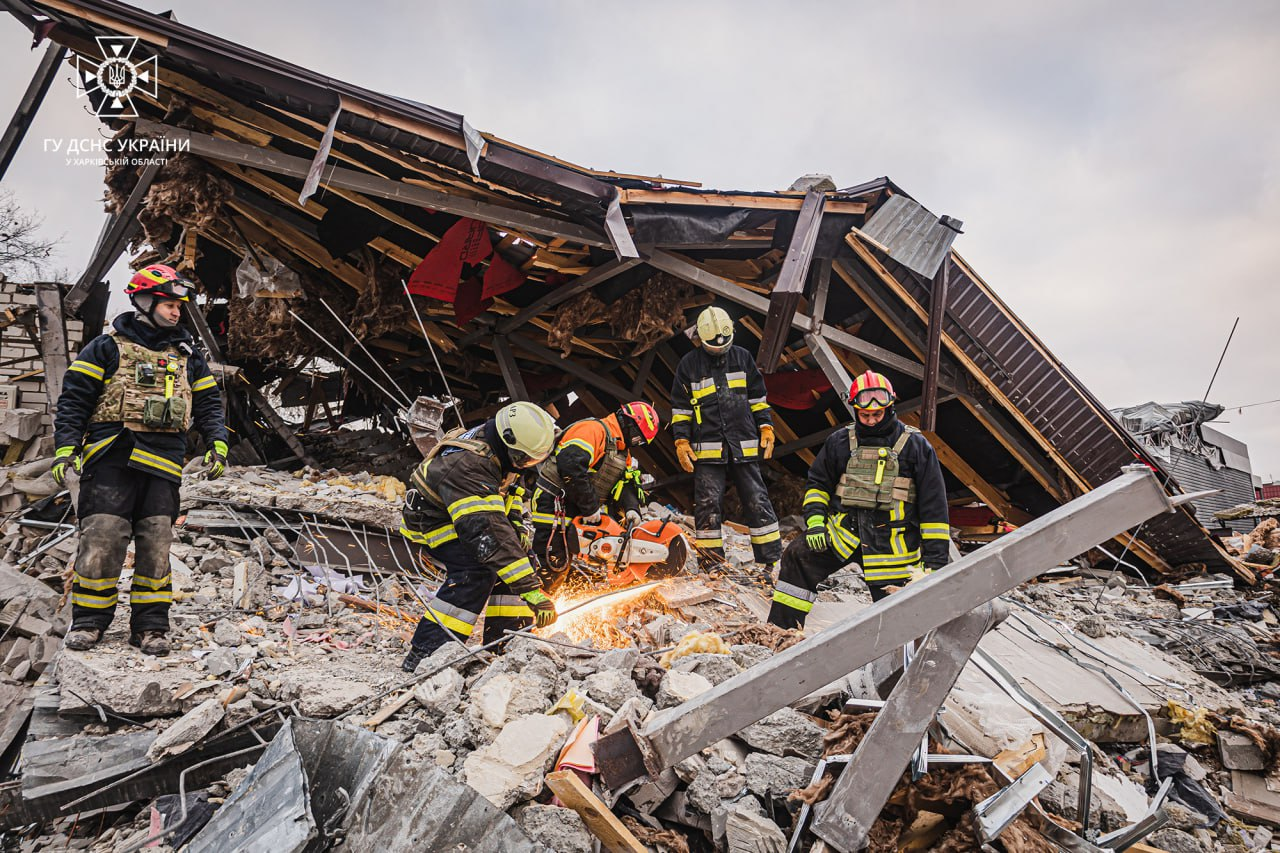
Hotel in Zolochiv (Kharkiv Oblast) after the attack

A two-month-old baby died following an overnight Russian missile attack that hit civilian buildings and a hotel in Zolochiv, Kharkiv Oblast.

The Ukrainian defence ministry claimed that the Special Operations Forces had conducted an operation on a Russian-occupied oil rig in the Black Sea that was being used to deploy Mohajer-6 drones, resulting in the capture of a Neva-B radar system and the destruction of the facility.

The SBU arrested five people, including members of Ukrainian intelligence agencies, on suspicion of being part of a Russian spy network.

President Zelenskyy signed a decree establishing the Unmanned Systems Forces, a new branch of the Armed Forces of Ukraine that would take charge of drone-related matters.

Russia claimed to have intercepted seven drones over Belgorod Oblast. No casualties were reported but four homes were damaged by falling debris.

=== 7 February ===
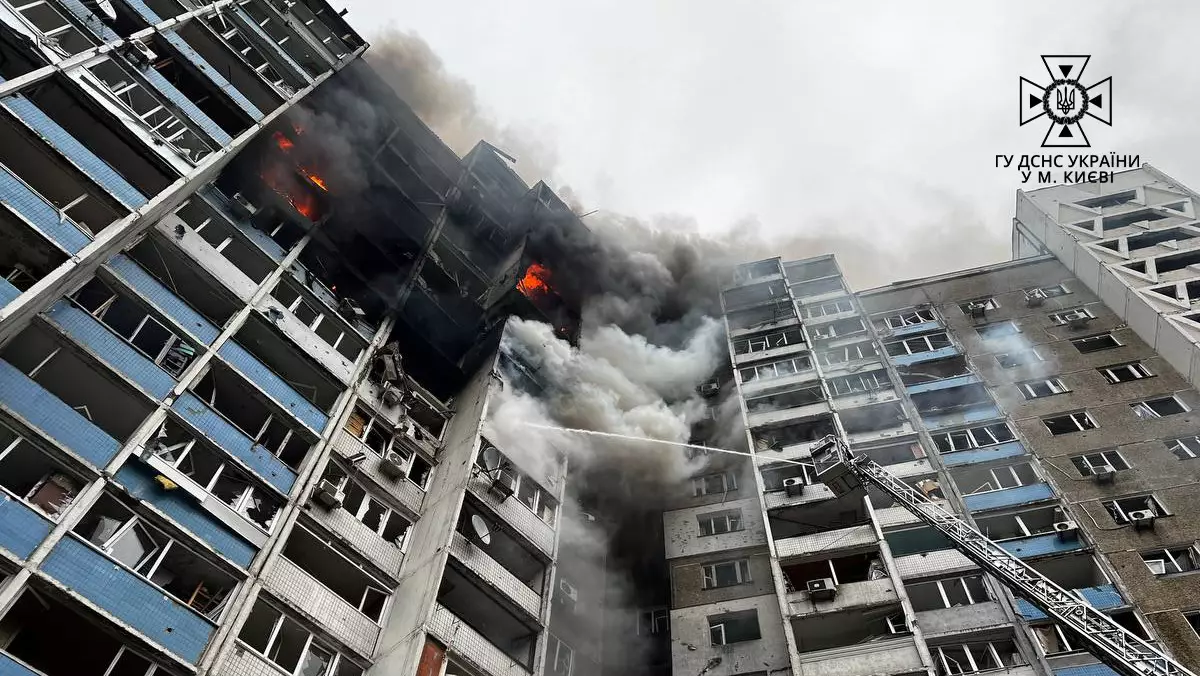
Damaged residential building in Kyiv

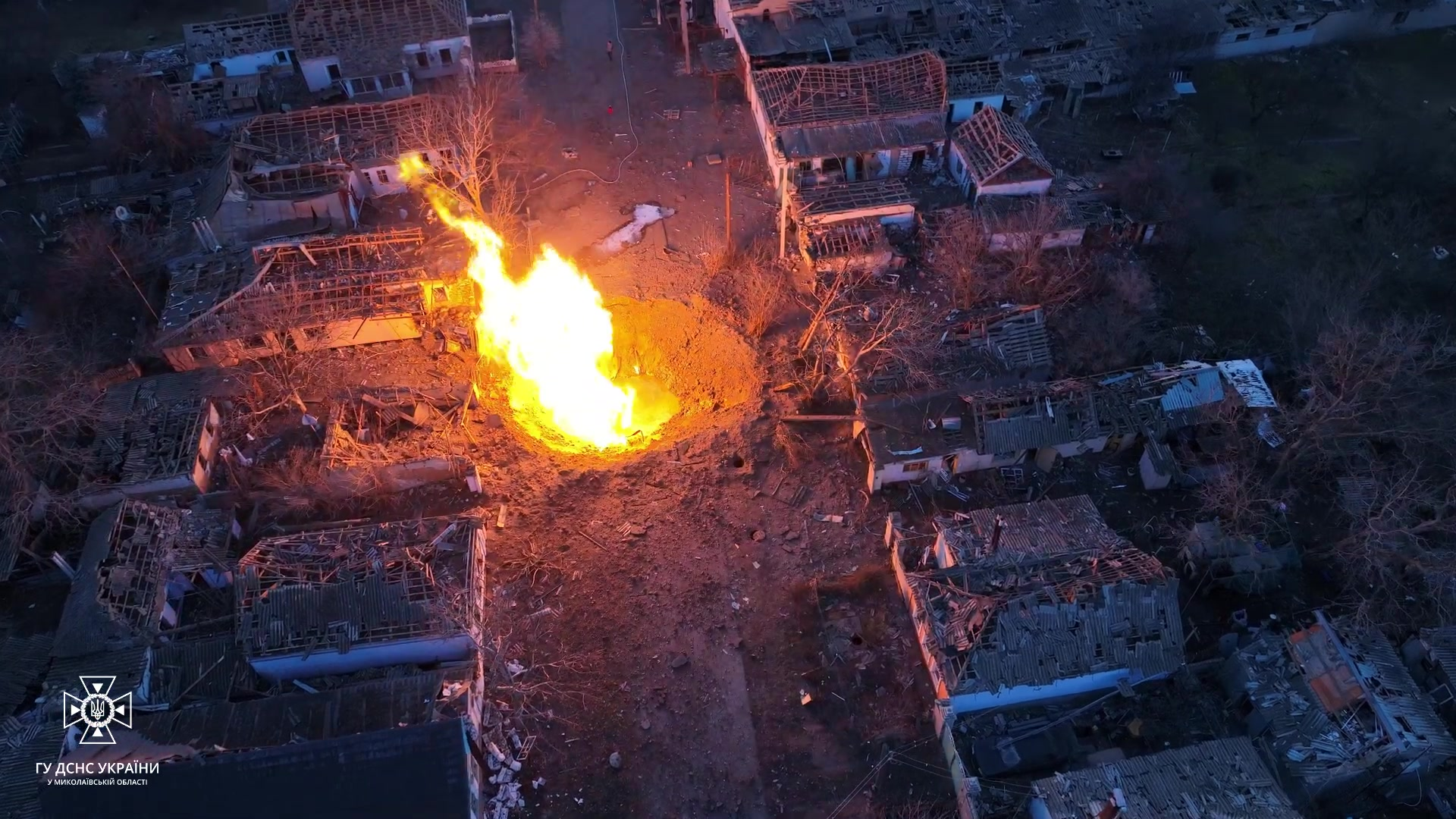
A crater on the street of Mykolaiv

Russia launched a wave of missile and drone attacks across Ukraine, killing one person in Mykolaiv and six others in Kyiv. The Ukrainian military said 64 missiles and drones were launched, of which 44 projectiles were shot down. Airstrikes were also reported in Kharkiv. One of the missiles launched was a hypersonic Zirkon cruise missile, the first time it had been used in the conflict, according to the Kyiv Scientific Research Institute.

The Ukrainian military claimed to have shot down a Russian Ka-52 Alligator helicopter near Avdiivka.

The 299th Tactical Aviation Brigade of the Ukrainian Air Force announced that one of its veteran pilots, Vladislav Rykov, was killed in action after having done 385 sorties.

The SBU arrested a woman on suspicion of aiding a Russian missile attack on Pokrovsk on 6 January that killed six civilians.

Rheinmetall outlined a new aid plan for Ukraine that would involve the delivery of ammunition for Leopard 1 and 2 tanks, Marder IFVs, Gepard anti-aircraft guns, 40 mm and "tens of thousands" of 155 mm shells. It also signed a contract to supply 25 Leopard 1A5 tanks, five recovery vehicles and five Leopard 1s for driver training.

In Russia, two people were reportedly injured by Ukrainian shelling on Belgorod.

Russia placed HUR chief Kyrylo Budanov, Ukrainian Navy Commander Oleksiy Neizhpapa, and Ukrainian Air Force Commander Mykola Oleshchuk on its list of "terrorists and extremists".

Sweden closed its investigation into the 2022 Nord Stream pipeline sabotage, citing lack of jurisdiction.

Ukraine announced that it would begin mass production of an "analogue" of the Russian Lancet drone with a range of 40 kilometres.

=== 8 February ===
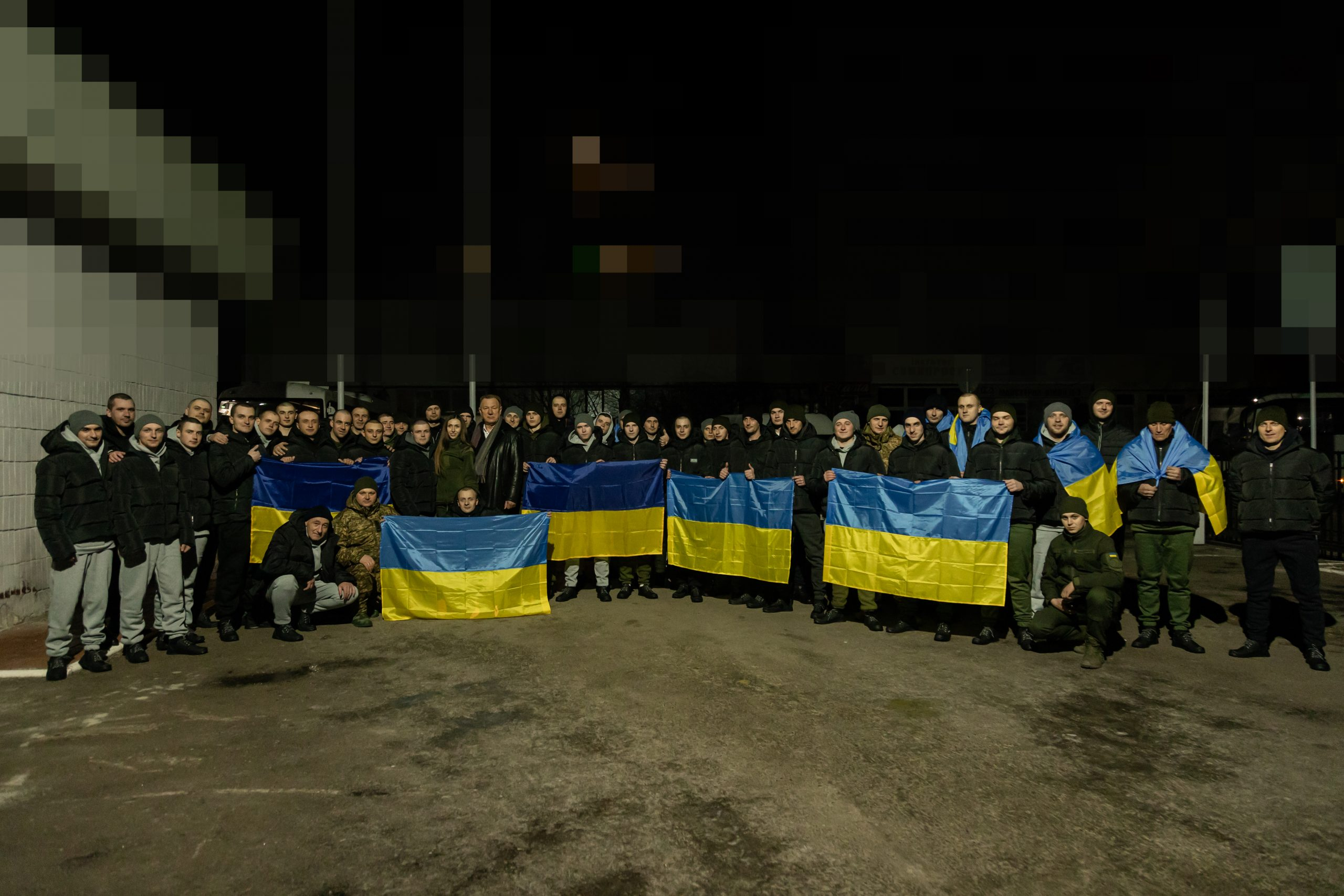
Ukrainian POWs returned on 8 February

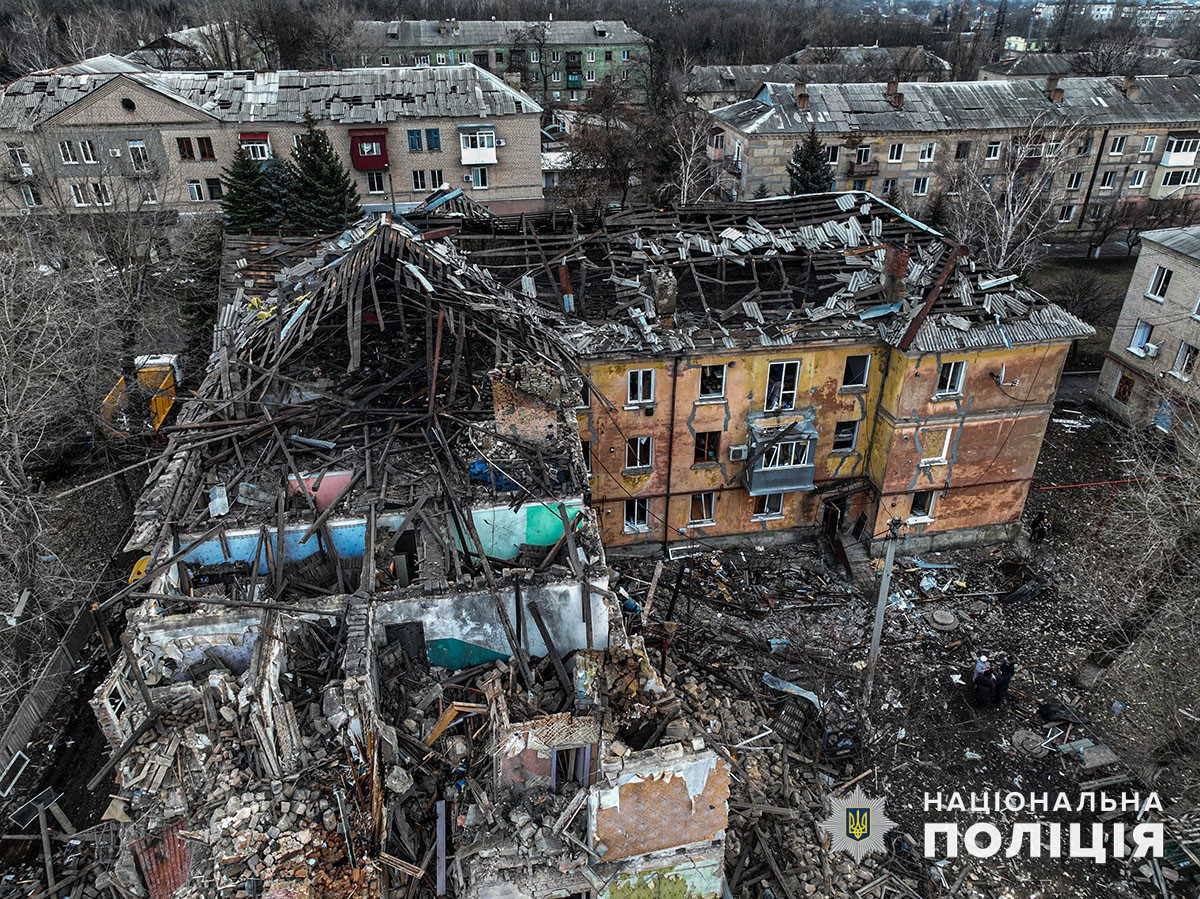
Residential buildings in Selydove after the strike

Zelenskyy replaced Commander-in-Chief Valerii Zaluzhnyi with Oleksandr Syrskyi amid reports of growing disagreements between the two. Zelenskyy also awarded Zaluzhnyi and HUR chief Kyrylo Budanov with the title of Hero of Ukraine, and later announced the return of 100 Ukrainian POWs, mostly captured following the siege of Mariupol, in a prisoner exchange in which 100 Russian POWs were also released, according to the Russian defence ministry.

One civilian was killed by Russian shelling in Avdiivka and one in Selydove, Donetsk Oblast.

The SBU said it had uncovered three Russian weapons caches in Kyiv, Vinnytsia, and Zakarpattia Oblasts. Among the items seized included grenade launchers, over 15 kilograms of explosives, and automatic weapons. At least one of the caches was believed to have been for the use of alleged "pro-Russian underground groups".

In Russia, the governor of Belgorod Oblast, Vyacheslav Gladkov claimed that six people were injured in two separate attacks by Ukraine.

=== 9 February ===
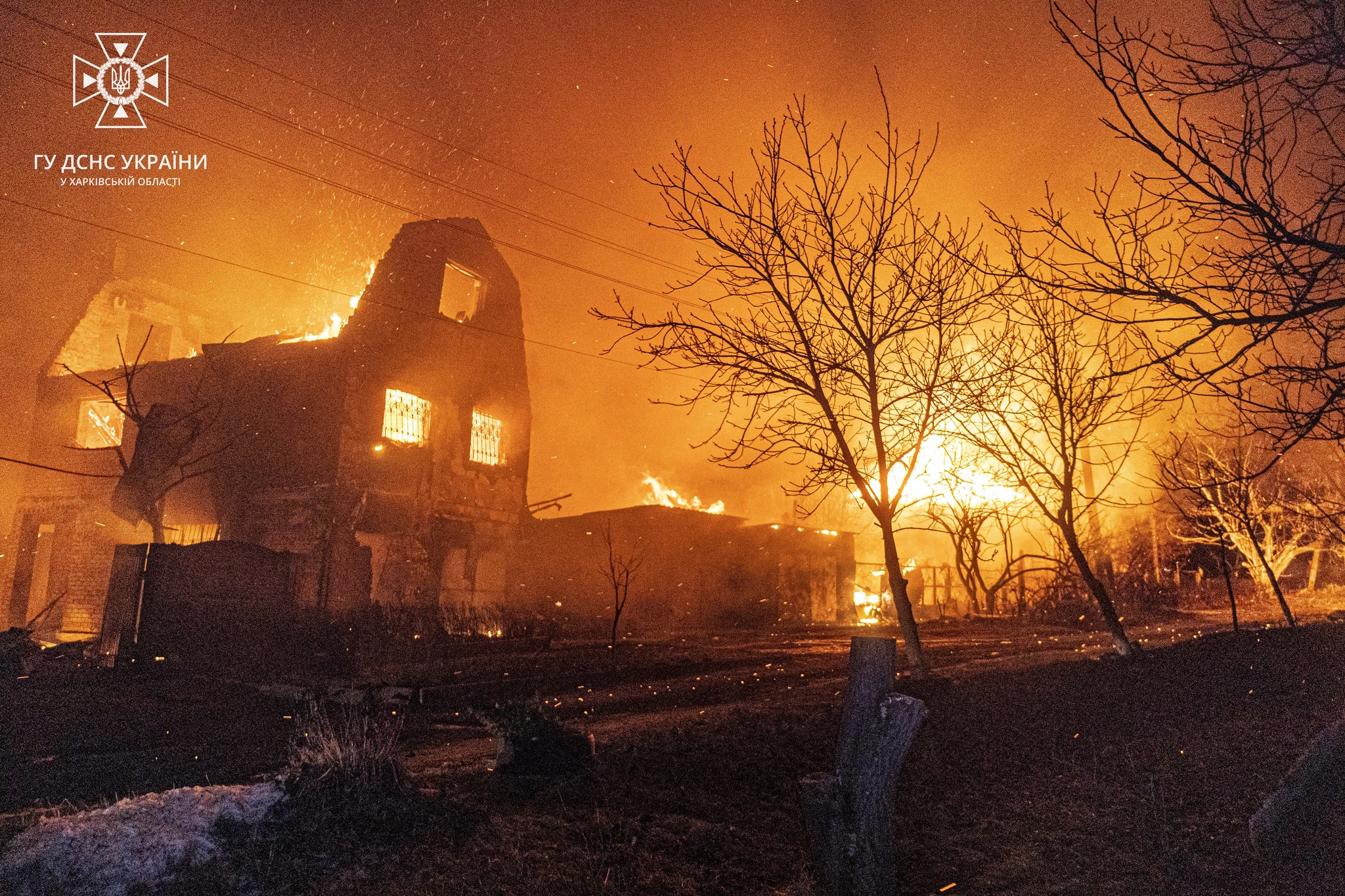
Burning street in Kharkiv after the drone attack

Seven people, including three children, were killed after a gas station in Kharkiv was blown up by Russian drones. Burning fuel flowed down the street, destroying 15 houses. Three people were killed by Russian airstrikes in Sumy Oblast.

Zelenskyy appointed Major General Anatoliy Barhylevych as the new Chief of General Staff of the Ukrainian Armed Forces, replacing Lieutenant General Serhiy Shaptala.

Russia claimed to have shot down 19 drones over the Black Sea, Krasnodar Krai and in Kursk, Bryansk, and Oryol Oblasts. One of the drones was reported to have started a fire within the premises of the Ilsky oil refinery in Krasnodar Krai. A refinery at Afipsky was also attacked without reports of damage or casualties.

The Ukrainian NACP added the US-based refractory manufacturing company Allied Mineral Products to its list of international sponsors of war for continuing to operate in Russia.

Oleksandr Porkhun, a veteran of the War in Donbas, was appointed as acting minister of veterans affairs of Ukraine.

Ukrainian soldiers reported that Russian forces appeared to be using SpaceX's Starlink satellite devices across the frontline, and that the internet terminals were being shipped to and deployed in Russia via Dubai.

=== 10 February ===
One person was killed in an attack in Kherson Oblast.

Zelenskyy named Colonels Vadym Sukharevskyi, commander of the 59th Separate Motorized Infantry Brigade, and Andrii Lebedenko as deputy commanders-in-chief of the Ukrainian Armed Forces. He also appointed Volodymyr Horbatiuk, Oleksii Shevchenko, and Mykhailo Drapatyi, as deputy chiefs of the Ukrainian general staff.

=== 11 February ===
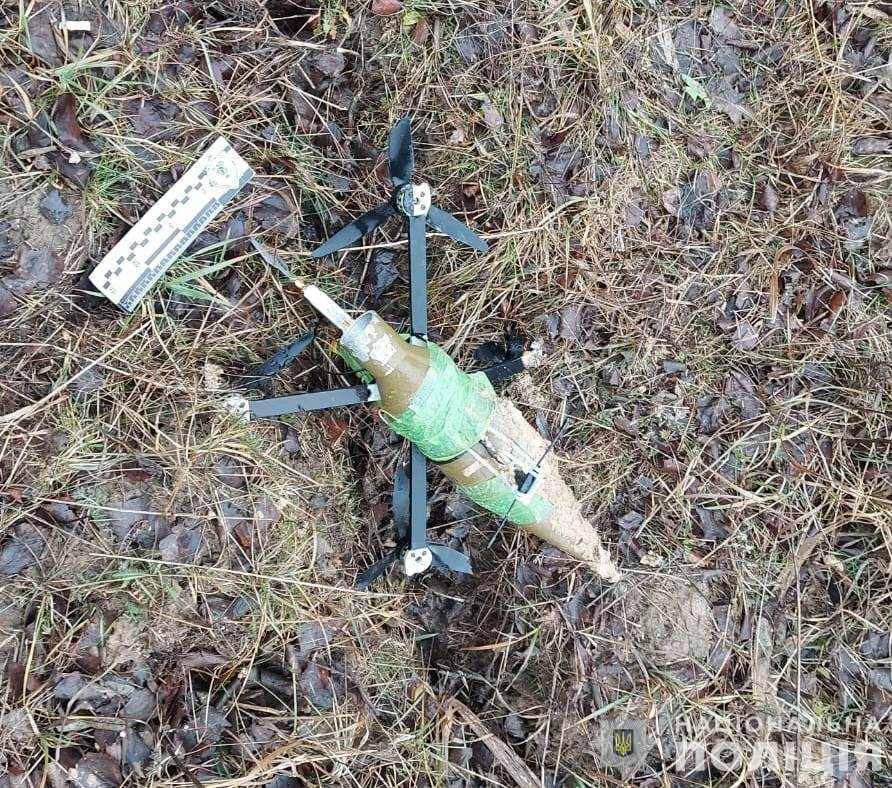
Russian drone with attached rocket-propelled grenade, found in Dnipropetrovsk Oblast

Zelenskyy appointed Lieutenant General Oleksandr Pavliuk as commander of the Ukrainian Ground Forces replacing Oleksandr Syrskyi, Major General Ihor Plakhuta as commander of the Territorial Defense Forces replacing Anatoliy Barhylevych, Brigadier General Ihor Skybiuk as commander of the Ukrainian Air Assault Forces replacing Maksym Myrhorodskyi, and Lieutenant General Yurii Sodol as commander of the Combined Forces replacing Serhii Naiev.

One person was killed in a Russian attack in Kharkiv Oblast.

In Russia, a drone was reportedly shot down over Belgorod Oblast.

Russian troops were found to have built a defensive line of railway cars in Donetsk Oblast measuring about 30 kilometres (19 mi).

In Moldova, border police found fragments of a Russian Shahed-type drone in the village of Etulia, which was suspected to have crashed in Moldova after being shot down by Ukrainian air defenses following a Russian attack against Ukraine's Izmail Raion on the night of 9 to 10 February, with 50 kg of explosives.

=== 12 February ===
A Ukrainian military commander said that Russian forces had stopped sending "human wave" attacks on Avdiivka and were instead resorting to smaller assault groups with air cover.

=== 13 February ===
In an interview with ZDF, Ukrainian military commander Oleksandr Syrskyi said that Ukrainian forces had shifted to defensive operations to exhaust advancing Russian forces. The Ukrainian 110th Mechanized Brigade was rotated out of Avdiivka after having been stationed there since March 2022 as it "no longer has sufficient capabilities to hold the city".

Three people were killed by Russian shelling in Kharkiv Oblast. Two others were killed in separate attacks in Nikopol and in Kherson Oblast. Russian-installed officials in Luhansk Oblast claimed that three people were killed by Ukrainian shelling in Kreminna.

In February 2024, Russian propaganda outlets spread information about an alleged Russian missile strike on a concentration of Ukrainian military and heavy losses for the Ukrainian Armed Forces near Selydove. Commander Oleksandr Tarnavskyi refuted their claims, stating it was a Russian information and psychological operation. Tarnavskyi claimed that in this way, "the occupiers divert attention from their daily colossal losses in the direction: on February 12 alone, the occupiers lost 645 soldiers, and from February 5 to 11, a total of 2947 persons."

The US Senate passed a bill that includes $61 billion in funding for Ukraine.

Russian pilot Maksim Kuzminov, who defected to Ukraine with his Mi-8 AMTSh helicopter in 2023, was found dead with 12 gunshot wounds at his residence in Spain.

=== 14 February ===
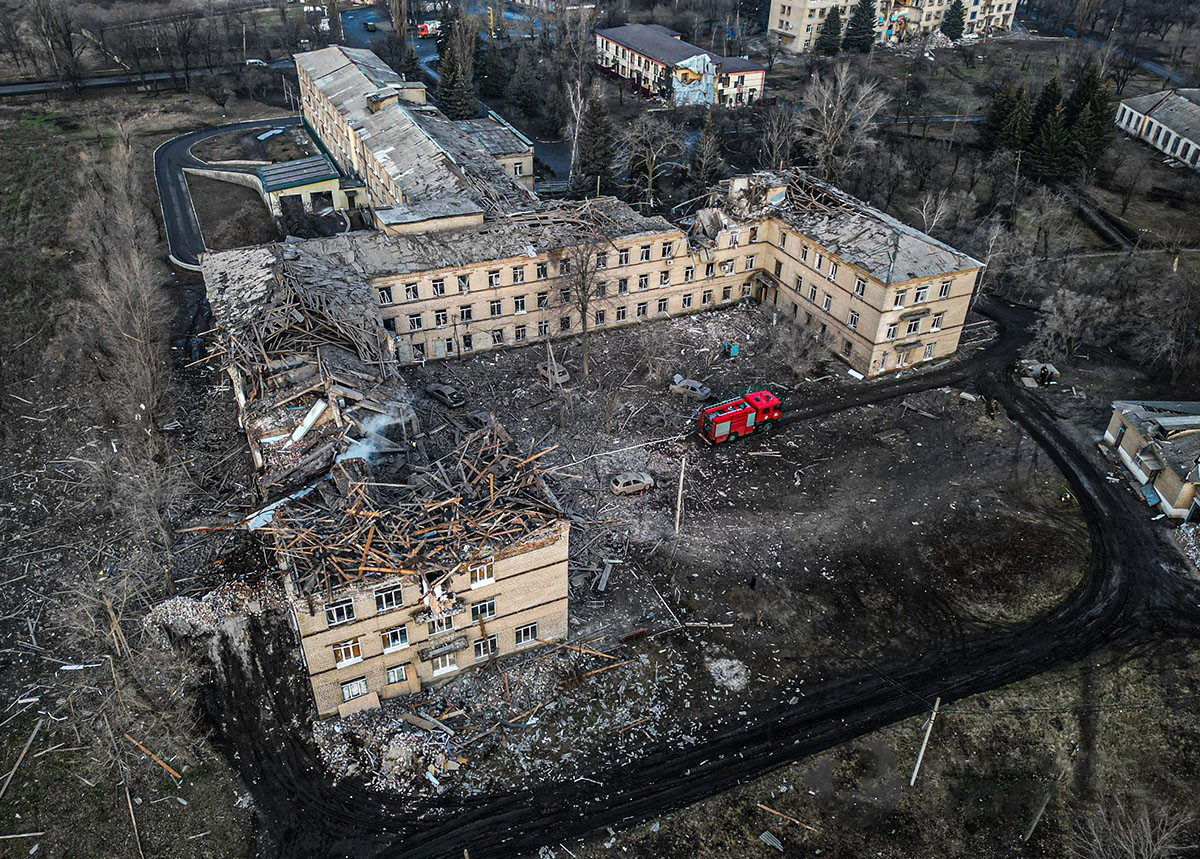
Selydove central city hospital after missile strike on 14 February

Ukrainska Pravda, citing sources from the HUR, reported that the Russian landing ship Tsezar Kunikov was sunk by drones in the Black Sea.

Three people, including a child, were killed by Russian shelling in Selydove. Two people were killed in a separate attack in Mykolaivka, Donetsk Oblast. Four people were killed in a Russian missile attack in Velykyi Burluk, Kharkiv Oblast while another was killed in Kherson.

Colonel Magomedali Magomedzhanov, the deputy commander of the Russian 18th Combined Arms Army and commander of the 61st separate Kirkenes Red Banner Marine Brigade of the Northern Fleet, died in a hospital in Sevastopol from injuries sustained while he was undertaking a military operation, according to the republican government of Dagestan.

Putin signed a law allowing for the confiscation of assets of those convicted of spreading "deliberately false information" about the Russian military.

Russian media published footage of what appeared to be the remains of a GLSDB reportedly found near Kreminna.

=== 15 February ===
Ukraine fired several missiles at Belgorod Oblast, according to Russian officials. Fourteen were shot down but one hit and "heavily damaged" a shopping centre in Belgorod city, killing seven, including children, and injuring 18 others. Another missile struck a sports stadium. Russia claimed the missiles were fired from an RM-70 Vampire. An oil refinery in Kursk Oblast was set on fire by a Ukrainian drone strike, according to local officials.

In Kharkiv Oblast, one person was killed in a Russian missile strike on Chuhuiv while three others died in Chorne. Two people were killed by Russian shelling in Kherson and Donetsk Oblast.

The Ukrainian Third Assault Brigade confirmed that it had been "urgently" redeployed to Avdiivka, adding that the situation there was "extremely critical", and claiming to have inflicted "critical losses" on two Russian brigades.

The NACP added the Irish-American oilfield service company Weatherford International to its list of international war sponsors for continuing to do business in Russia.

=== 16 February ===
Ukrainian commander Oleksandr Tarnavskyi said that Ukrainian forces had withdrawn from the Zenit air defense complex in Avdiivka, which they had used as a strongpoint since 2014.

One person was killed by Russian shelling in Sumy Oblast.

Belarusian President Alexander Lukashenko claimed that a group of Ukrainian and Belarusian saboteurs were caught with explosives on the border with Ukraine as part of plans to commit acts of sabotage in Russia and Belarus.

President Zelenskyy arrived in Germany to sign a bilateral security deal with the German government. The German government announced that it would give €7.1bn of military aid to Ukraine in 2024. Along with a separate €1.13bn aid package. Which included 100 IRIS-T missiles, a SykNex air defence unit, 18 howitzers and 18 self propelled howitzers. Later in the day, Zelenskyy signed a 10-year bilateral security deal with President Macron in France that would provide Ukraine with "3 billion euros ($3.2 billion)" of aid in 2024.

Germany delivered 3,990 155 mm shells, 18 armored personnel carriers, three Wisent demining tanks, 62 reconnaissance drones, a Dachs engineering vehicle, nine mine-clearing plows, four border guard vehicles, and 500 LED lights and IT equipment to Ukraine.

=== 17 February ===
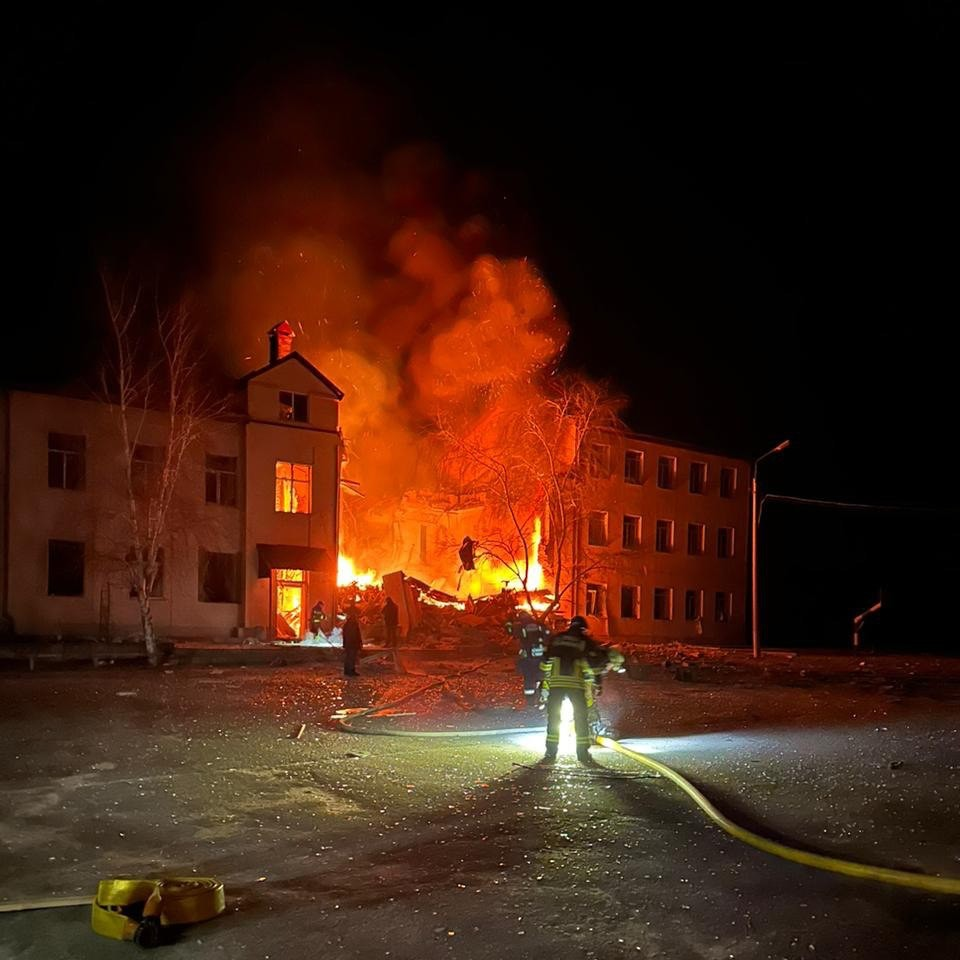
School in Sloviansk after missile strike on 17 February

Ukrainian commander-in-chief Oleksandr Syrskyi announced the withdrawal of Ukrainian forces from Avdiivka to prevent encirclement by the Russian army. The city fell to Russian forces later in the day, with pockets of resistance remaining in the Avdiivka Coke Plant. Between 500 and 1000 Ukrainian soldiers are believed to have been captured or gone missing in the withdrawal. Russian forces were also storming Robotyne, according to the ISW. Ukraine claimed to have defeated a Russian offensive in Zaporizhzhia Oblast, killing 70 Russian soldiers and injuring 80 as well as destroying 18 pieces of equipment, including three tanks.

The Ukrainian Air Force claimed to have shot down two Russian Su-34s and a Su-35 fighter jet over eastern Ukraine.

Five people were killed by Russian attacks in Kherson, Kharkiv, Donetsk and Sumy Oblasts.

In Russia, officials claimed that 14 drones were shot down over Belgorod, Kaluga, Bryansk, and Voronezh Oblasts.

In Moldova, border police reported it had found fragments of a Russian drone near the village of Etulia Nouă.

Rheinmetall signed a joint venture to open a factory in Ukraine that would produce hundreds of thousands of 155mm calibre bullets annually. Czech President Petr Pavel said that his country could supply Ukraine with "half a million 155 mm and 300,000 122 mm shells" within weeks if funding is found.

=== 18 February ===
Ukrainian air defences shot down a Russian Su-34 fighter-bomber. Twelve Russian drones and a Kh-59 cruise missile were also destroyed overnight.

Ukraine opened an investigation after video emerged of Russian forces summarily executing eight POWs in Avdiivka and Vesele, Donetsk Oblast. Another investigation was opened after video emerged subsequently emerged of three Ukrainian POWs allegedly being shot near Robotyne.

Russian hackers launched cyberattacks on several Ukrainian media outlets, with Ukrainska Pravda reporting that its account was used to spread misinformation regarding the Ukrainian military.

Danish Prime Minister Mette Frederiksen announced that her country would donate its entire artillery ammunition stockpile to Ukraine. The US government said it was transferring $500,000 in seized Russian funds to Ukraine via Estonia.

=== 19 February ===
Ukraine claimed that its air defences shot down two Russian fighter jets: an Su-34 and an Su-35S.

Zelenskyy visited Ukrainian positions in Kupiansk.

Canada pledged 800 SkyRanger R70 multi-mission drones to Ukraine.

Russian forces in Novoazovsk, occupied Donetsk Oblast, brought down a suspected Banshee drone using electronic warfare systems.

=== 20 February ===
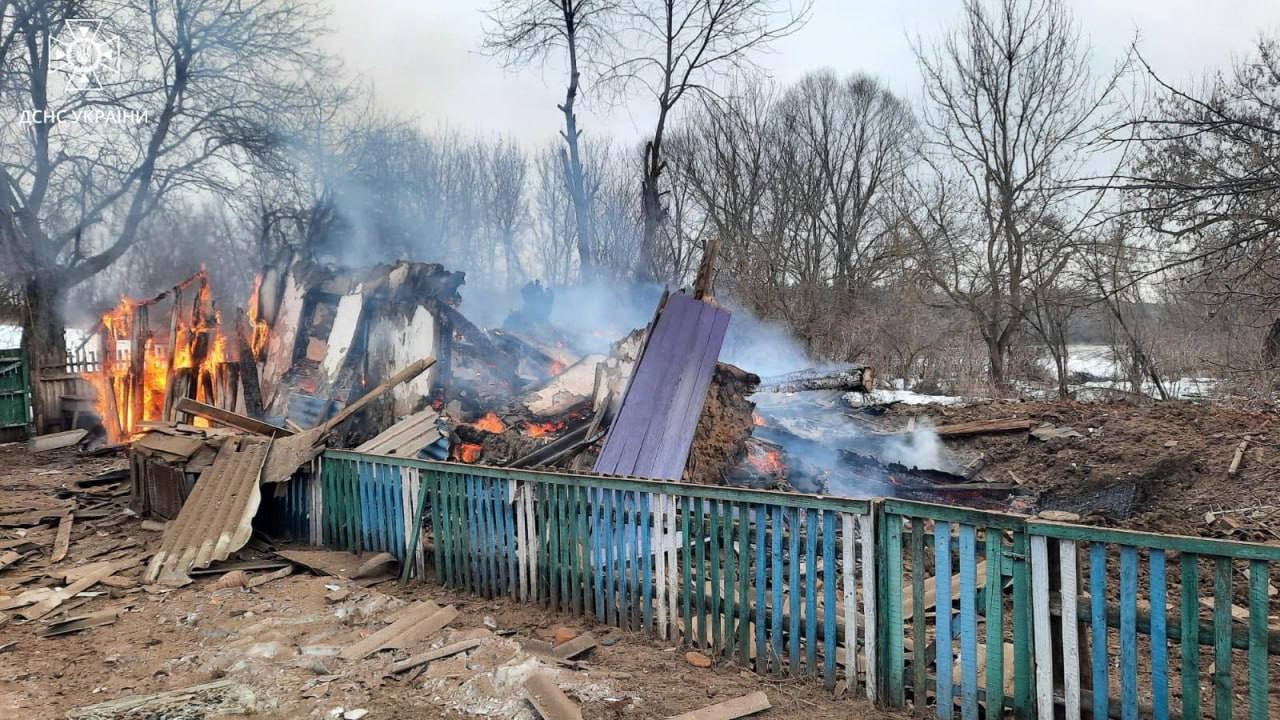
Destroyed house in Nova Sloboda

Ukraine claimed that at least 60-68 Russian soldiers and were killed and 300 were wounded in a HIMARS strike on a training ground near Trudivske, occupied Donetsk Oblast. Two "sub-units", the 4th and 6th companies, numbering between 80 and 120 soldiers each, were reportedly "cut down".

Russia claimed that it had pushed out Ukrainian forces from their bridgehead across the Dnipro River in Krynky, Kherson Oblast. The Ukrainian military denied the claims. Five people were killed by Russian shelling in Nova Sloboda, Sumy Oblast. Two people were killed in a Russian drone strike in Kupiansk.

Sweden announced a 7.1-billion kronor ($682 million)-military aid package to Ukraine.

=== 21 February ===
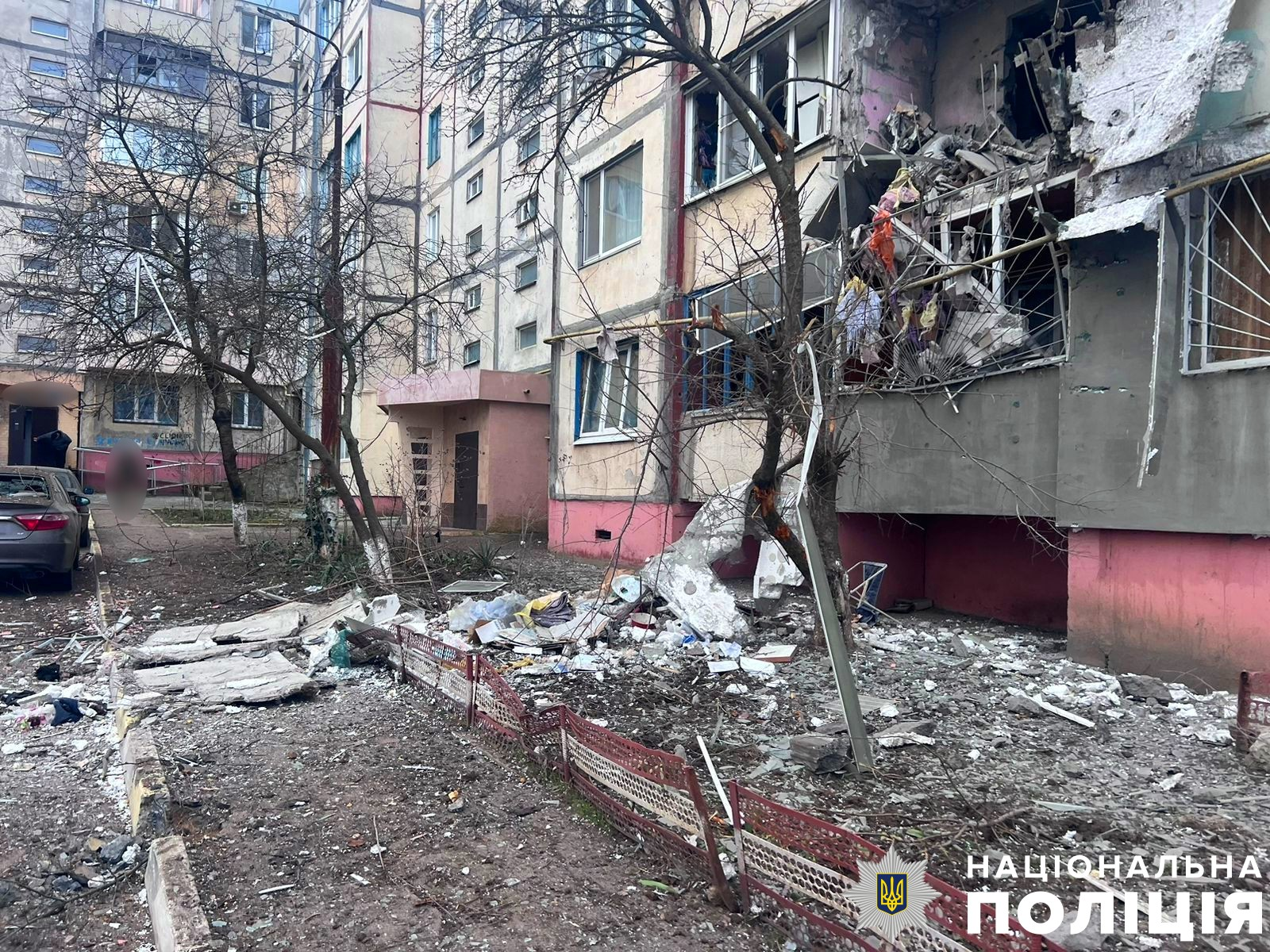
Residential building in Kherson, shelled on 21 February

According to the commander of the Ukrainian Air Force, Mykola Oleshchuk, a Russian Su-34 fighter jet was shot down.

The SBU arrested a resident of Kharkiv on suspicion of aiding a Russian missile strike in the city in 23 January.

Zelenskyy signed a law allowing foreign nationals to serve in the National Guard of Ukraine.

=== 22 February ===
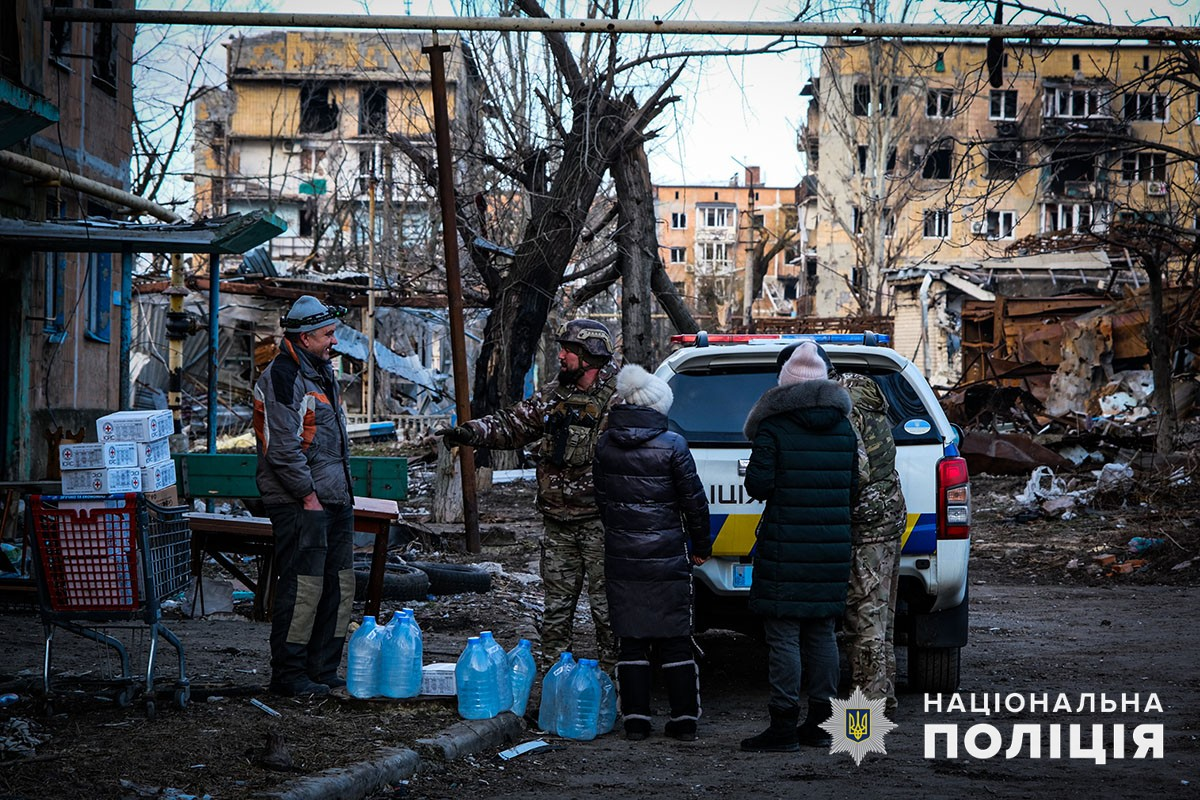
Police delivers water and food to citizens of destroyed Vuhledar

The Ukrainian military claimed that it had killed around 60 Russian soldiers in an artillery strike on a training ground near Podo-Kalynivka, Kherson Oblast.

Russia claimed to have taken the village of Pobieda, five kilometers west of Donetsk.

One person was killed by Russian shelling in Kherson Oblast. One person was killed in a separate attack in Donetsk Oblast.

New Zealand pledged $26 million in military and humanitarian aid to Ukraine, including for the training of soldiers and the procurement of weapons and ammunition. Denmark also pledged 1.7 billion kroner ($247 million) in military aid and signed a 10-year security agreement with Ukraine. UK defence minister Grant Shapps announced plans to send 200 Brimstone anti-tank missiles to Ukraine, while in Germany, the Bundestag voted down a proposal to send Taurus missiles to Ukraine and approved instead a motion to send additional other long-range weapons.

=== 23 February ===
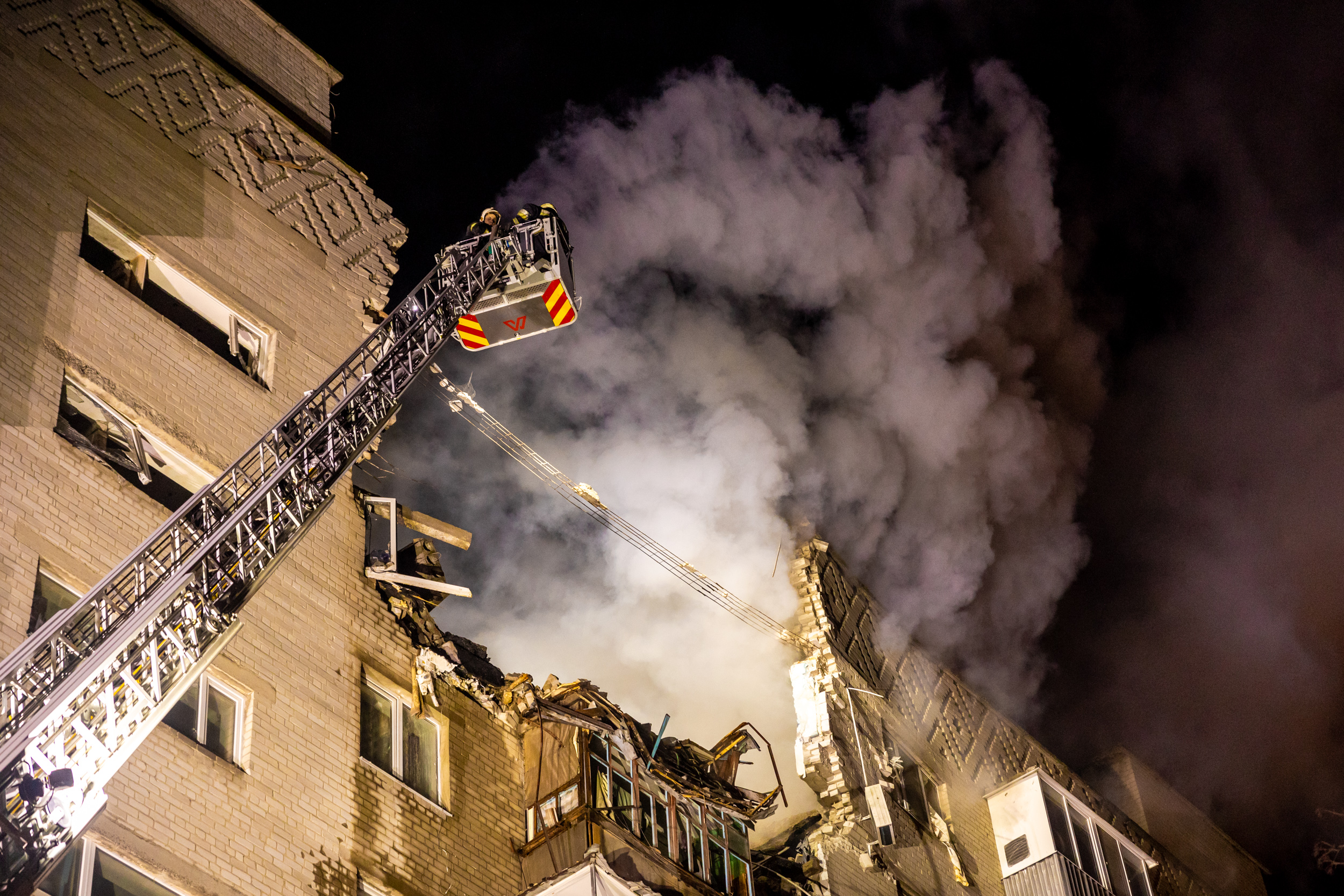
Damaged residential building in Dnipro

The US and EU announced sanctions on 600 individuals and entities associated with Russia over its invasion of Ukraine and the death of Alexei Navalny.

Two people were killed in a Russian drone strike in Dnipro and five in Odesa.

The Ukrainian Air Force announced the downing of a Russian Beriev A-50 early warning and control aircraft in Krasnodar Krai, making it the second such loss during the invasion.

Ukrainian intelligence confirmed that the Czech Republic was organising some $2 billion in funding to purchase artillery shells for Ukraine from southern African countries and South Korea.

=== 24 February ===
The UK pledged £245 million ($311 million) to replenish Ukrainian artillery ammunition stocks.

Russia claimed to have downed drones over Lipetsk, Kursk and Tula Oblasts. Ukraine claimed that its drones set fire to the Novolipetsk Steel plant in Lipetsk. No casualties were reported however the facility was evacuated.

Ukraine opened an investigation after video emerged showing seven Ukrainian POWs reportedly being executed by Russian soldiers near Bakhmut.

=== 25 February ===
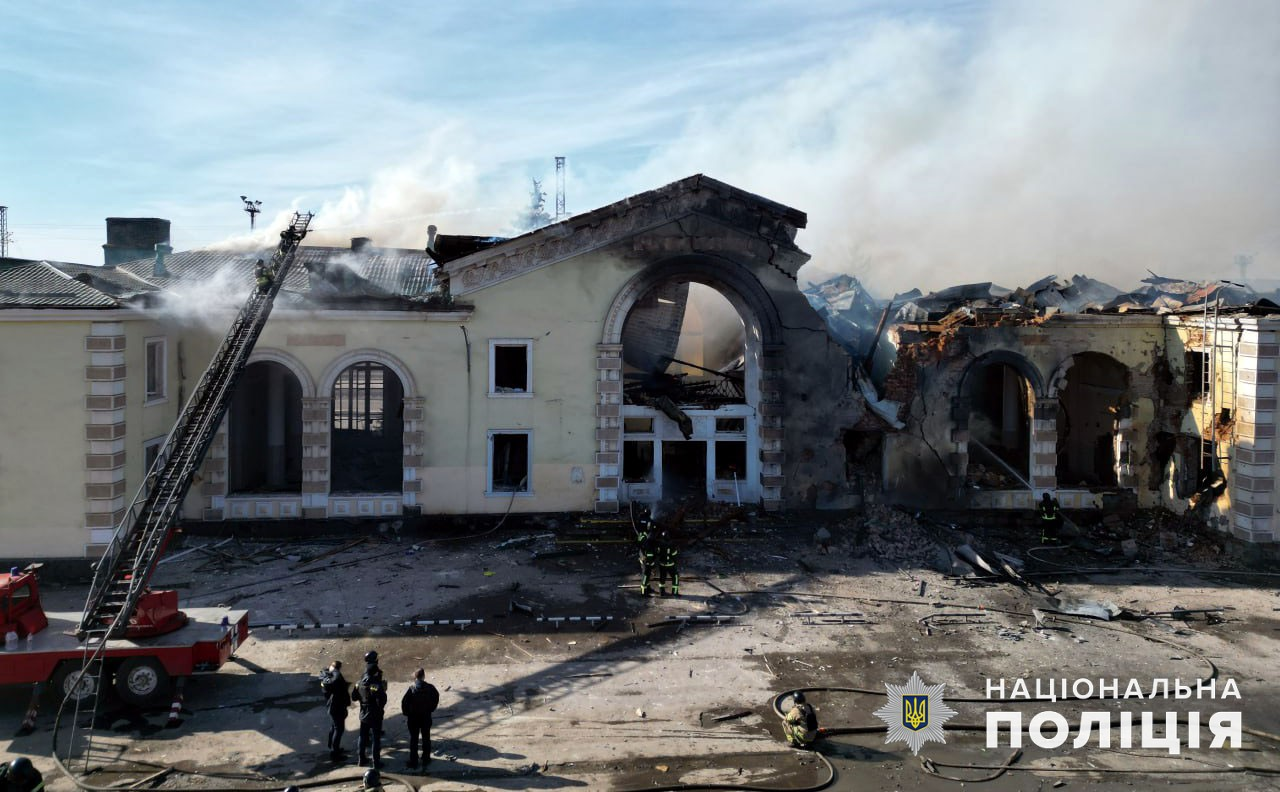
Kostiantynivka Railway Station after the attack

In a rare disclosure, Zelenskyy said that 31,000 Ukrainian soldiers had been killed since the start of the Russian invasion in 2022.

Russia claimed to have shot down six drones over Belgorod Oblast and the Black Sea.

Russian bombing destroyed the central railway station of Kostiantynivka, Donetsk Oblast, and damaged several dozen other buildings. One person was killed in a Russian drone strike in Nikopol. Two others were killed by Russian shelling in Tiahynka, Kherson Oblast.

=== 26 February ===
The Ukrainian military announced that it had withdrawn from the village of Lastochkyne, west of Avdiivka. Russia later said it had taken the village and claimed to have pushed back Ukrainian forces by 10 kilometers. Ukraine appeared to have recorded its first loss of an M1A1 Abrams tank in battle. as well as its first loss of a NASAMS system to Russian forces in Zaporizhzhia.

Zelenskyy signed a law revising the conditions for the demobilization of conscripts.

In Russia, the Governor of Belgorod Oblast claimed a Ukrainian drone strike killed three people and wounded another three in the village of Pochaevo.

Denmark dropped its investigation into the 2022 Nordstream pipeline sabotage, citing insufficient grounds to support a criminal case.

Slovak Prime Minister Robert Fico claimed that several NATO and EU members were considering to deploy soldiers to Ukraine. which was denied by NATO secretary general Jens Stoltenberg. French President Emmanuel Macron gave his support for EU funds to be used to buy ammunition for Ukraine outside the bloc, particularly the Czech proposal to buy artillery ammunition from southern Africa and South Korea. Germany announced a new military aid package to Ukraine that included 14,000 155mm shells and four WISENT 1 mine-clearing vehicles.

=== 27 February ===
Ukrainian forces withdrew from the villages of Stepove and Sieverne near Avdiivka. Ukrainian commander Oleksandr Tarnavskyi said that defence lines in the area had "stabilised" along the Tonenke-Orlivka-Berdychi axis.

The Ukrainian Air Force claimed the downing of two Russian Su-34 fighter jets on separate occasions. The Ukrainian military said a Russian Shahed drone overflew Moldovan airspace for "tens of kilometers" on its way to Ukraine, where it was intercepted. Ukrainian partisans claimed to have blown up an office of the United Russia party in Nova Kakhovka.

Two police officers were killed by Russian shelling in Khotin. One person was killed in a separate attack in Kherson Oblast.

The Netherlands said it would contribute over €100 million to a Czech initiative to purchase artillery ammunition for Ukraine.

South Korean defence minister Shin Won-sik claimed that North Korea had sent Russia three million shells to use in Ukraine in exchange for "thousands of containers of food".

A HIMARS strike killed 19 Russian soldiers from the 155th Naval Infantry Brigade including a colonel and 2 other ranking officers. The unit commander was also wounded.

=== 28 February ===
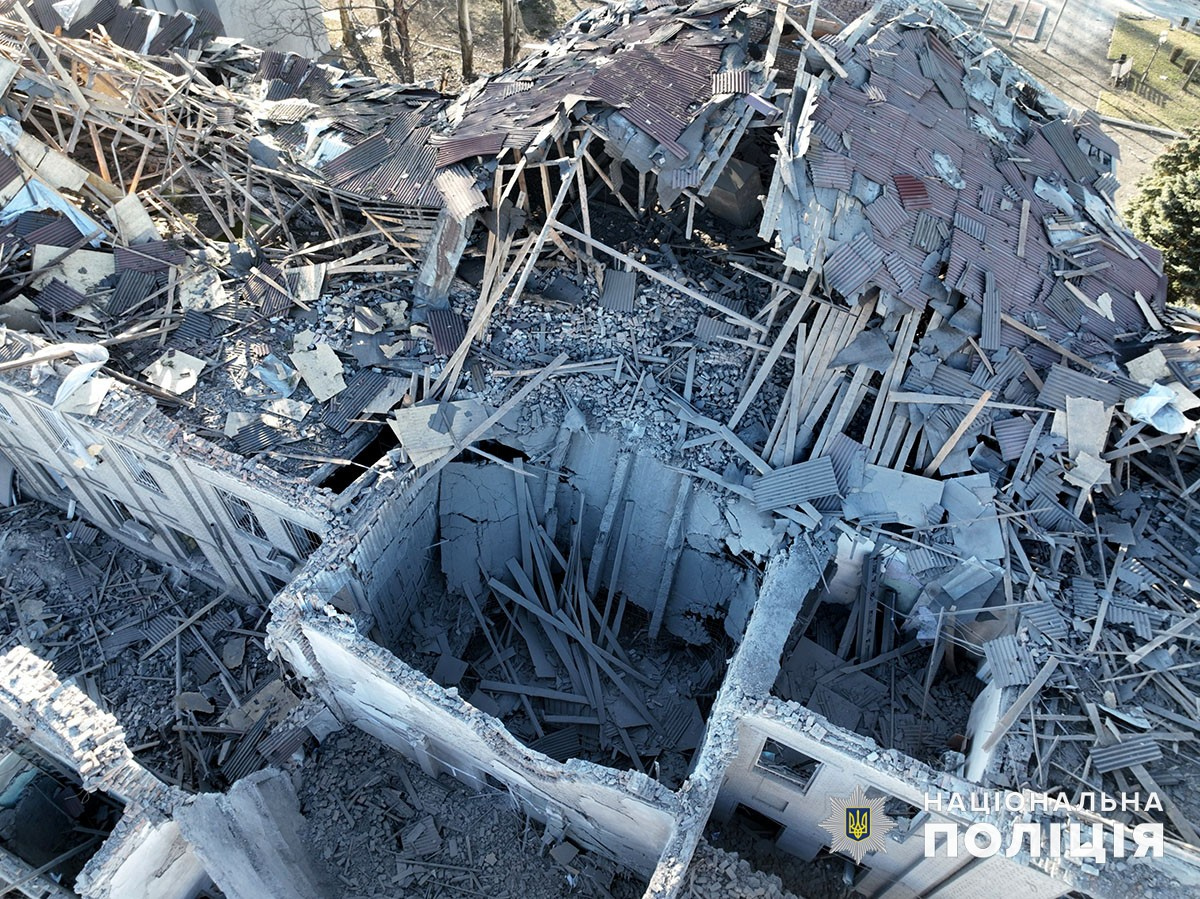
Building of Donetsk National Technical University in Pokrovsk after missile attack on 28 February

The Ukrainian 3rd Assault Brigade claimed that they drove out Russian troops from Krasnohorivka a day after Russian forces entered it, killing or injuring 100 Russian soldiers in the process.

In Kharkiv Oblast, four people, including a child, were killed in separate Russian attacks in Kupiansk and Velykyi Burluk railway station. Two people were killed by shelling in Nikopol and in occupied Zaporizhzhia Oblast.

Belgium announced it would contribute 200 million euros to the Czech initiative to buy artillery ammunition for Ukraine from outside the EU.

=== 29 February ===
The Ukrainian Air Force claimed to have shot down three Russian Su-34 jets, including two near Mariupol and Avdiivka. The Ukrainian military claimed to have killed 19 Russian soldiers and wounded twelve in a missile strike in Olenivka, Donetsk Oblast. Fighting was reported in the centers of Ivanivske and Bohdanivka, near Chasiv Yar. The HUR claimed that a S-1 anti-aircraft missile system was damaged in an attack in Russia's Belgorod Oblast.

Russian forces claimed to have reentered Robotyne and killed more than 20 Ukrainian commandoes during an ambush near the Crimean coast.

Zelenskyy appointed Brigadier General Volodymyr Karpenko as commander of the Ukrainian military's Logistics Forces, replacing Major General Oleh Huliak.

Finnish officials confirmed that Ukraine can use Finnish-supplied weapons on targets in Russia.

== March 2024 ==
=== 1 March ===
Ukraine claimed to have shot down a Russian Su-34 jet and 14 Shahed drones while Russia claimed to have shot down four drones over Belgorod and Nizhny Novgorod Oblasts.

=== 2 March ===
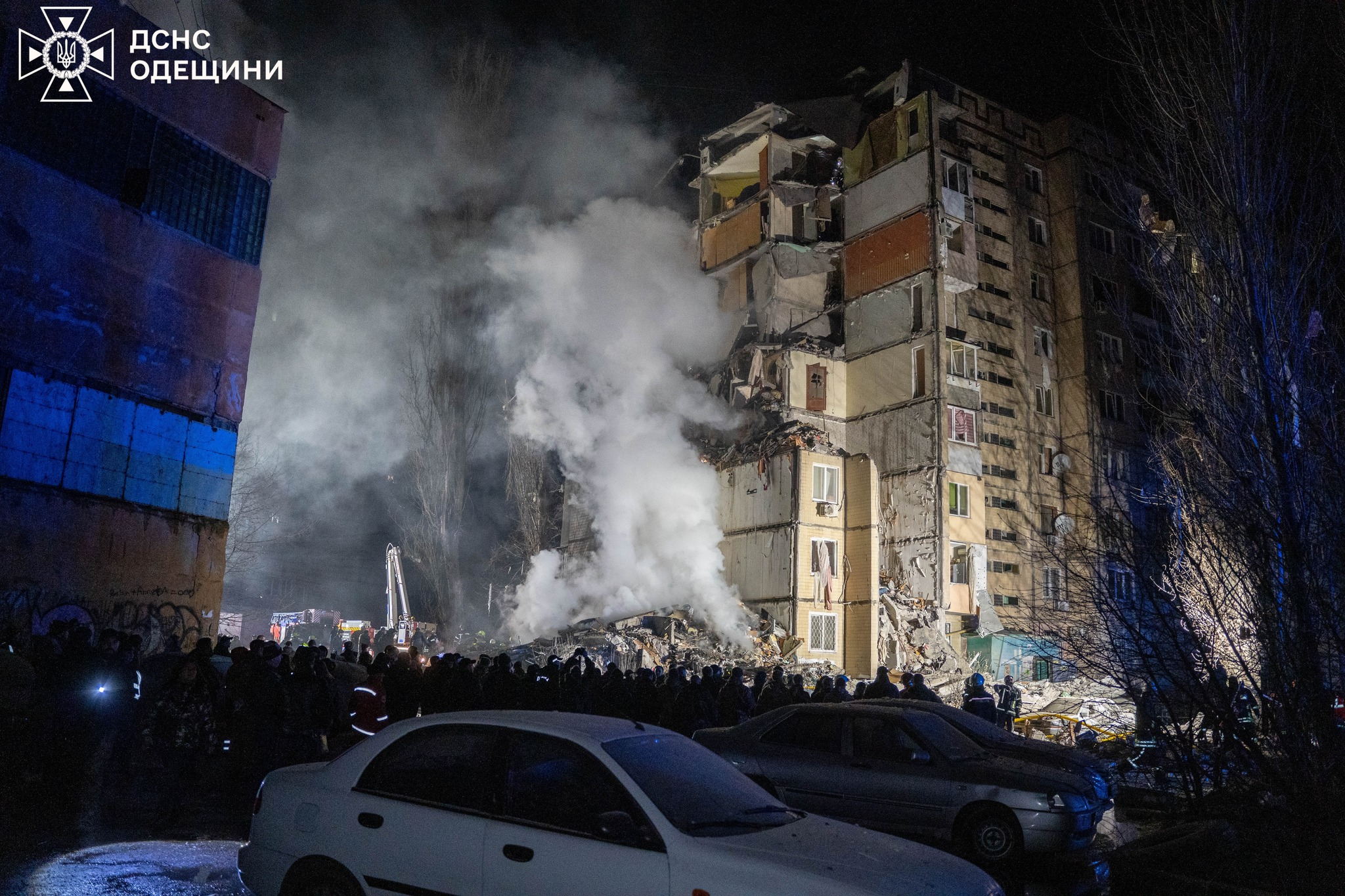
Residential building in Odesa after the attack

Twelve people, including five children, were killed while 20 others were injured in a Russian drone strike on a residential building in Odesa. Three people were killed in separate attacks in Kharkiv, Kherson and Zaporizhzhia Oblasts.

Russian forces claimed to have captured a "fully operational" M2 Bradley.

Ukraine claimed to have shot down a Russian Su-34 jet.

A suspected Ukrainian drone caused an explosion that damaged two buildings in St Petersburg, forcing the evacuation of 100 people and medical treatment for six others.

The Czech government said it expected Ukraine to receive the first batch of 155 mm shells purchased outside of the EU "within weeks" following support in funding by other European countries.

Russian television played leaked audio from a Webex discussion in which it claimed German Air Force officers were discussing striking the Crimean Bridge using Taurus missiles. The German Defense Ministry subsequently confirmed the authenticity of the recording, saying that the conversation had been intercepted but adding that it was "unable to say for certain whether changes were made" before it was released.

=== 3 March ===
Russia claimed to have shot down 38 drones over Crimea. The Crimean bridge was temporarily closed and video on social media allegedly showed an explosion near a fuel depot in Feodosia.

One person was killed by Russian shelling in Kherson Oblast. Sixteen people were injured in a separate attack in Kurakhove.

=== 4 March ===
The HUR claimed responsibility for a cyberattack on the Russian defence ministry and an explosion at a railway bridge in Russia's Samara Oblast.

Two emergency responders were killed in a Russian double tap attack in Kramatorsk Raion, Donetsk Oblast. One person was killed in a Russian cluster munitions attack in Zaporizhzhia Oblast.

The SBU arrested a resident of Dnipro on suspicion of spying for Russia.

Zelenskyy appointed Brigadier General Oleksandr Yakovets as commander of the Ukrainian military's Support Forces, replacing Dmytro Hereha.

Lithuania joined the Czech initiative to purchase artillery ammunition for Ukraine.

A retired US Army Colonel and civilian employee of the US Strategic Command was arrested for leaking classified information on Ukraine through a dating website.

Russia issued an arrest warrant for former Ukrainian ambassador Petro Vrublevskyy for calling on Ukrainian soldiers to "kill as many Russians as possible" in an interview when he was posted in Kazakhstan in 2022.

=== 5 March ===
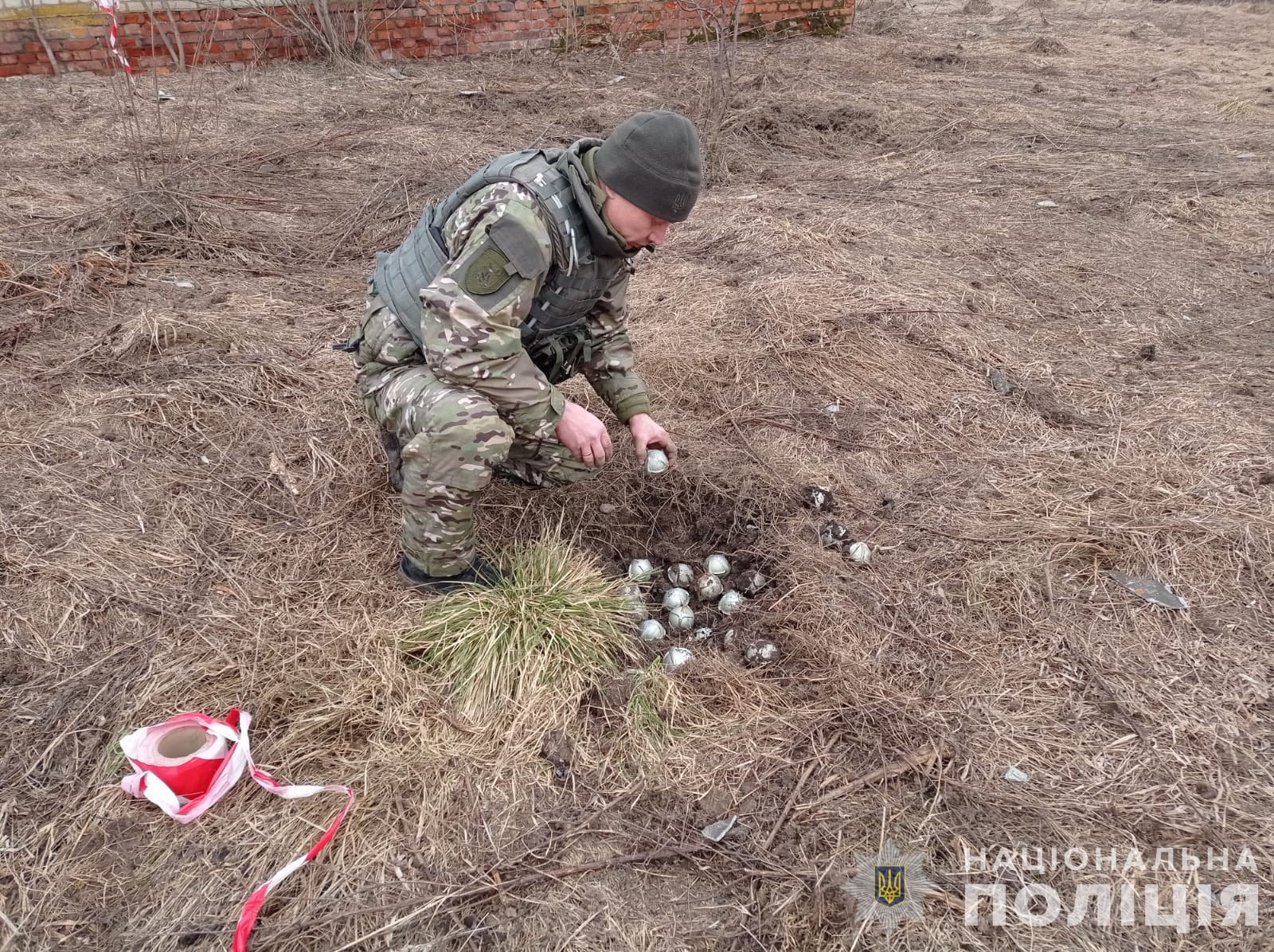
Cluster bomblets ShOAB-0,5, scattered by Russian airplanes in Sumy Oblast

The Russian patrol ship Sergey Kotov, along with an on-board helicopter was sunk by Ukrainian naval drones near the Kerch Strait. The HUR claimed that seven people on board were killed while six others were injured. The Crimean bridge was closed to traffic due to Ukrainian naval and air drones attacking Kerch.

Ukraine confirmed it had used the French-made Hammer bomb in combat for the first time.

Two people were killed in separate Russian attacks in Kharkiv and Donetsk Oblasts.

A Ukrainian court convicted and sentenced two residents of Donetsk Oblast to between 10 and 12 years imprisonment for spying for Russia. The SBU arrested a resident of Zaporizhzhia on suspicion of planning a bomb attack on behalf of Russia.

Russia claimed to have shot down four drones over Kursk and Belgorod Oblasts. One drone was reported to have caused an explosion at an oil depot in Belgorod. The governor of Kursk Oblast claimed that shelling destroyed a railway station in Glushkovo.

The International Criminal Court issued arrest warrants for Sergey Kobylash, the commander of the Long-Range Aviation of the Russian Aerospace Forces, and Viktor Sokolov, the commander of the Black Sea Fleet over their role in war crimes in Ukraine.

Ukraine charged two Russian soldiers for killing a resident of Bucha in 2022.

France joined the Czech initiative to purchase artillery ammunition for Ukraine. Argentina said it would send two Mi-171E helicopters to Ukraine.

=== 6 March ===
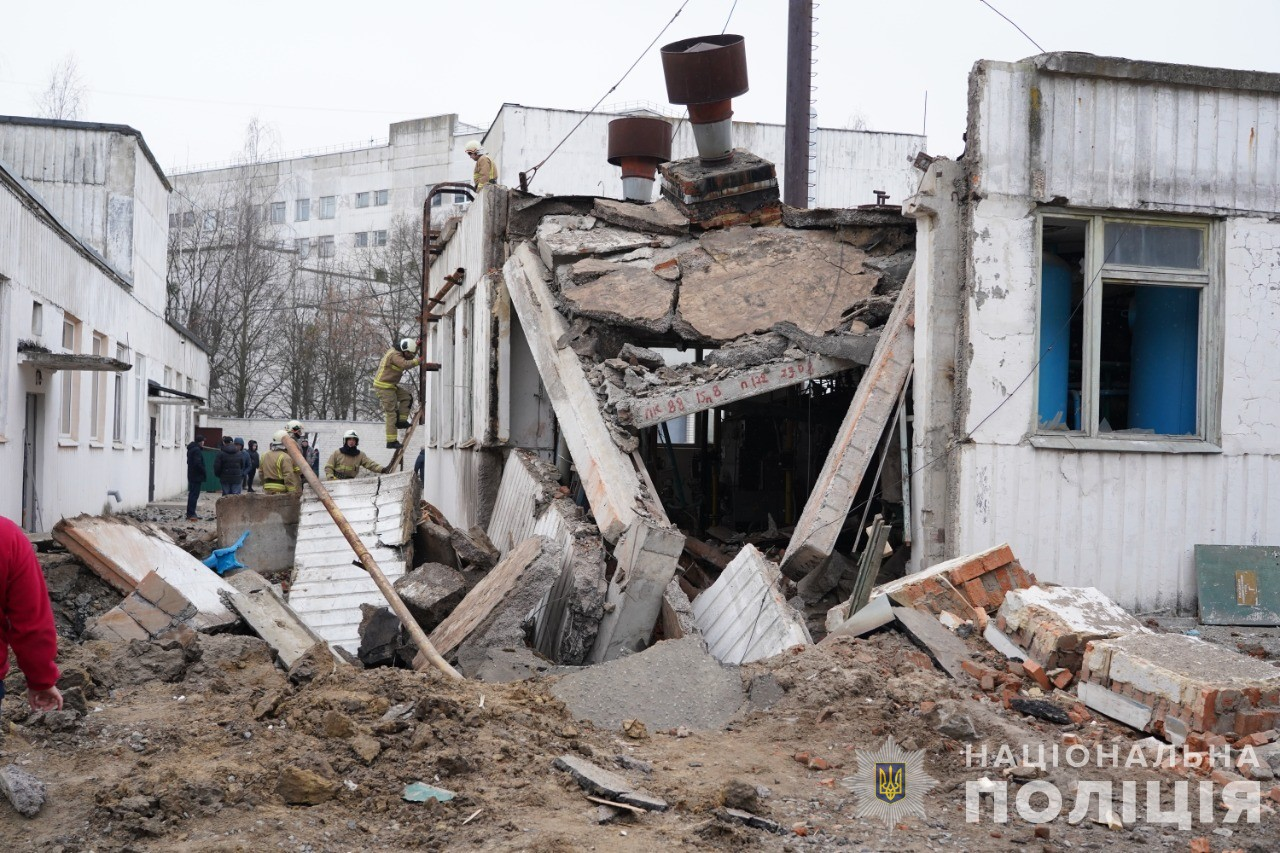
Destructions in Sumy City Clinical Hospital after Russian drone attack

Russian missiles fired at Odesa narrowly missed President Zelenskyy's motorcade, in what was believed to be an assassination attempt. The missiles landed some 500 feet from Zelenskyy and Greek Prime Minister Kyriakos Mitsotakis. The attack killed five people without causing injury to the President or Prime Minister.

Russia claimed that a Ukrainian drone strike set fire to a warehouse in Kursk Oblast. Attacks were also reported in Voronezh and Belgorod Oblasts. The Mikhailovsky Mining and Processing Plant was struck twice by Ukrainian drones. A source from the HUR later confirmed the attack. Another Ukrainian drone strike cut power to large parts of Crimea.

One person was killed in a Russian attack in Kharkiv Oblast. Exiled officials said that a member of the local branch of the Russian electoral commission in occupied Berdiansk was killed in a car bombing. Pro-Russian officials claimed that five people were killed after the bus they were travelling on hit a landmine in Kirovsk, Luhansk Oblast, while two people were killed by Ukrainian shelling in Kreminna.

The SBU captured a soldier from Dnipropetrovsk Oblast who was trying to flee to Transnistria on suspicion of spying for Russia.

A Russian court sentenced a Ukrainian soldier captured during the Siege of Mariupol to 20 years imprisonment on war crimes charges.

=== 7 March ===
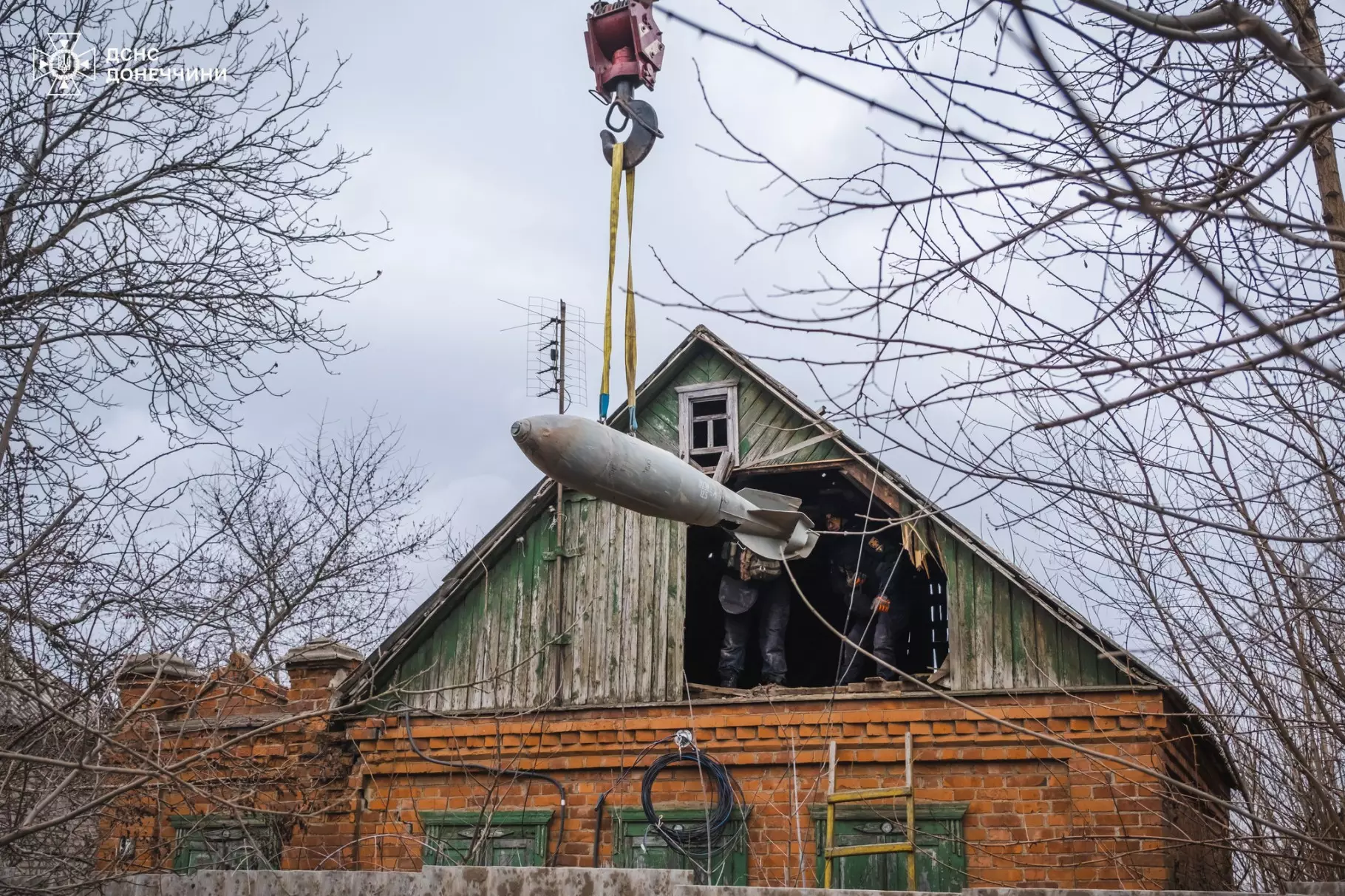
Extraction of an unexploded Russian air-dropped bomb FAB-500, which hit a private house in Kostiantynivka, Donetsk Oblast

Russia claimed to have retaken the southern part of Robotyne.

Two people were killed and 26 others injured in a Russian missile attack on Sumy. In Kharkiv Oblast, three people were killed in separatist Russian attacks in Kupiansk and Vovchansk. Ukrainian authorities ordered mandatory evacuations in 57 settlements near Kupiansk in response to Russian attacks.

Ukrainian Border Guards apprehended a Russian sabotage and reconnaissance group which tried to cross the border in Sumy Oblast.

In Russia, the FSB claimed to have killed a Belarusian national on suspicion of plotting an attack in Karelia on behalf of Ukraine.

Norway announced the payment of 1.6 billion kronor ($153 million) towards the Czech initiative to purchase artillery ammunition for Ukraine. UK defence secretary Grant Shapps also announced a donation of 10,000 drones to Ukraine during his visit to Kyiv.

Former head of the Ukrainian military General Valerii Zaluzhnyi was named as the new Ukrainian ambassador to the UK.

Czech President Petr Pavel announced that the plan to purchase 800,000 artillery shells for Ukraine had reached its targeted budget with contributions from 18 countries, adding that deliveries to Ukraine would start within "weeks".

=== 8 March ===
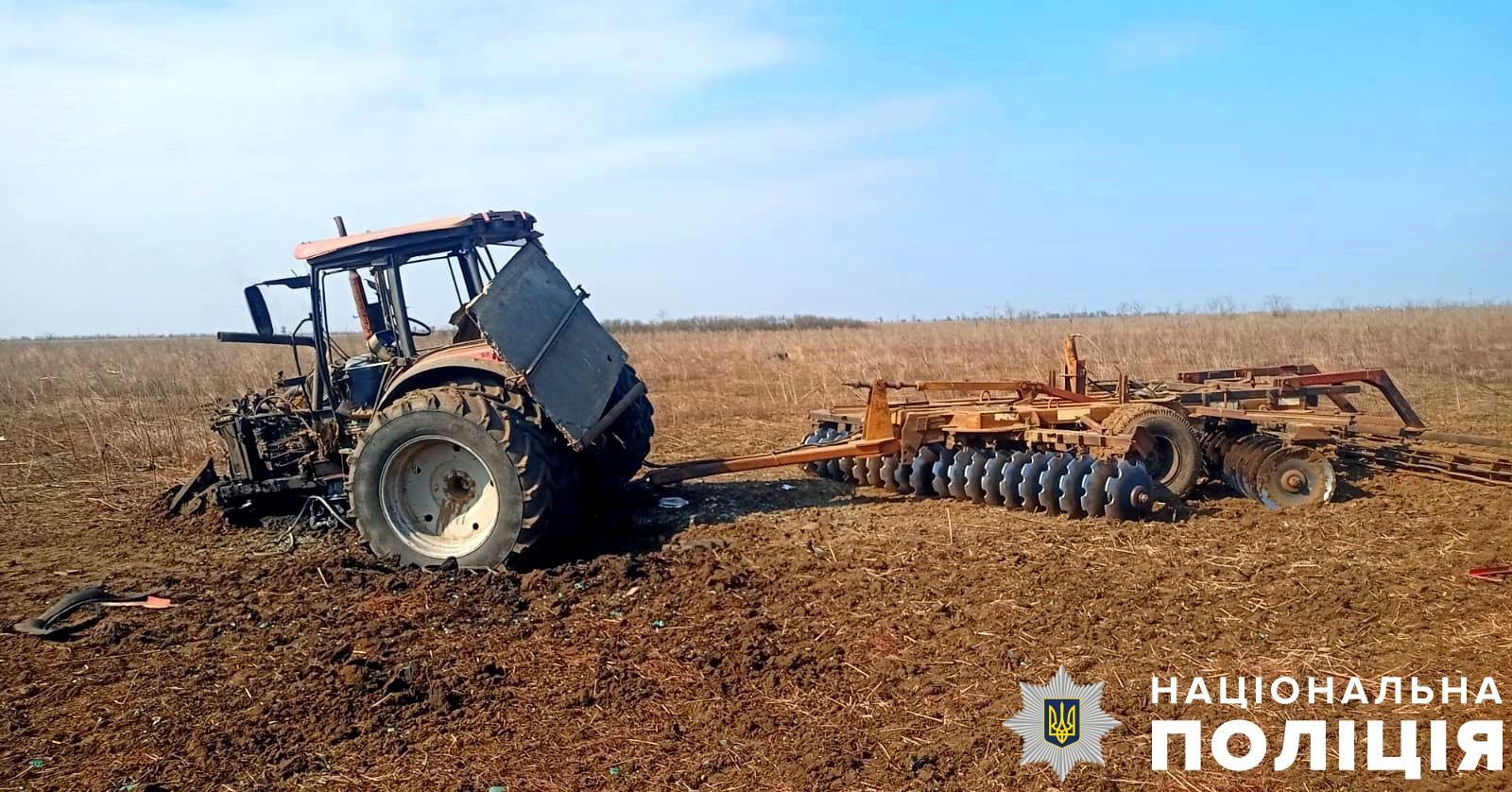
Tractor that blew up on a mine in Kherson Oblast

Three people were killed in Russian attacks in Vovchansk. The Ukrainian-appointed governor of Zaporizhzhia Oblast reported explosions at Russian military facilities in occupied Melitopol and Tokmak.

In Russia, two people were killed and a third person was critically injured during Ukrainian drone attacks on Rozhdestvenka, Belgorod Oblast, which came after the Russian Defense Ministry announced it downed several drones over the region throughout the morning.

=== 9 March ===
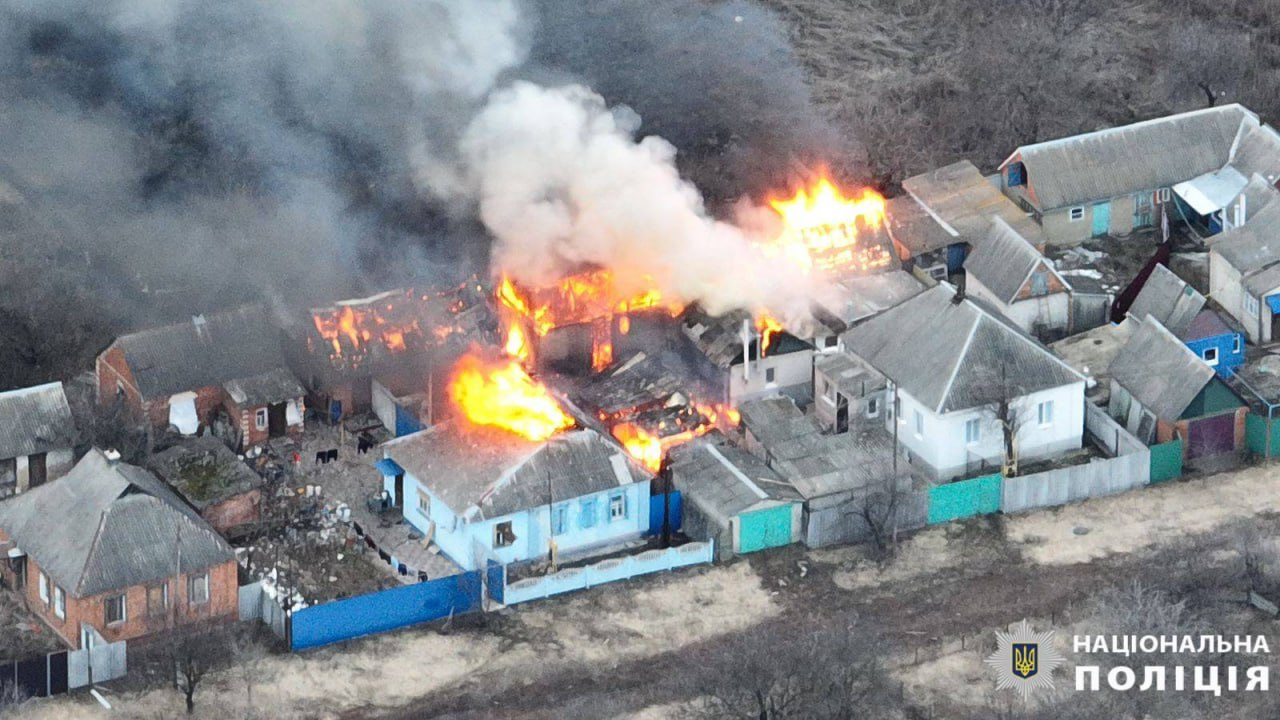
Houses in Odnorobivka settlement (Kharkiv Oblast), shelled on 9 March

Russia claimed to have destroyed some 47 Ukrainian drones over Rostov, Volgograd, Belgorod and Kursk Oblasts. Five explosions were reported in Taganrog. One person was injured and the roof of a medical clinic was hit with patients having to be evacuated from the intensive care unit. The Beriev Aircraft Company based in Taganrog, which repairs A-50 radar aircraft, was also damaged.

One person was killed and another was wounded by Russian artillery attacks in Chervonohryhorivka, while another person was killed in a Russian artillery attack in Chasiv Yar. The Russian Ministry of Defense also said it shot down a Ukrainian MiG-29 fighter jet over Pokrovsk.

=== 10 March ===
Two people were killed in a Russian drone strike in Dobropillia, Donetsk Oblast, while 12 people were injured in a separate attack in Myrnohrad.

In Russia, a woman was killed in Kulbaki, Kursk Oblast and her husband wounded by Ukrainian shelling according to the regional governor, who also claimed that a fire broke out at an oil depot following the interception of a drone. A drone was also reportedly shot down in Leningrad Oblast.

=== 11 March ===
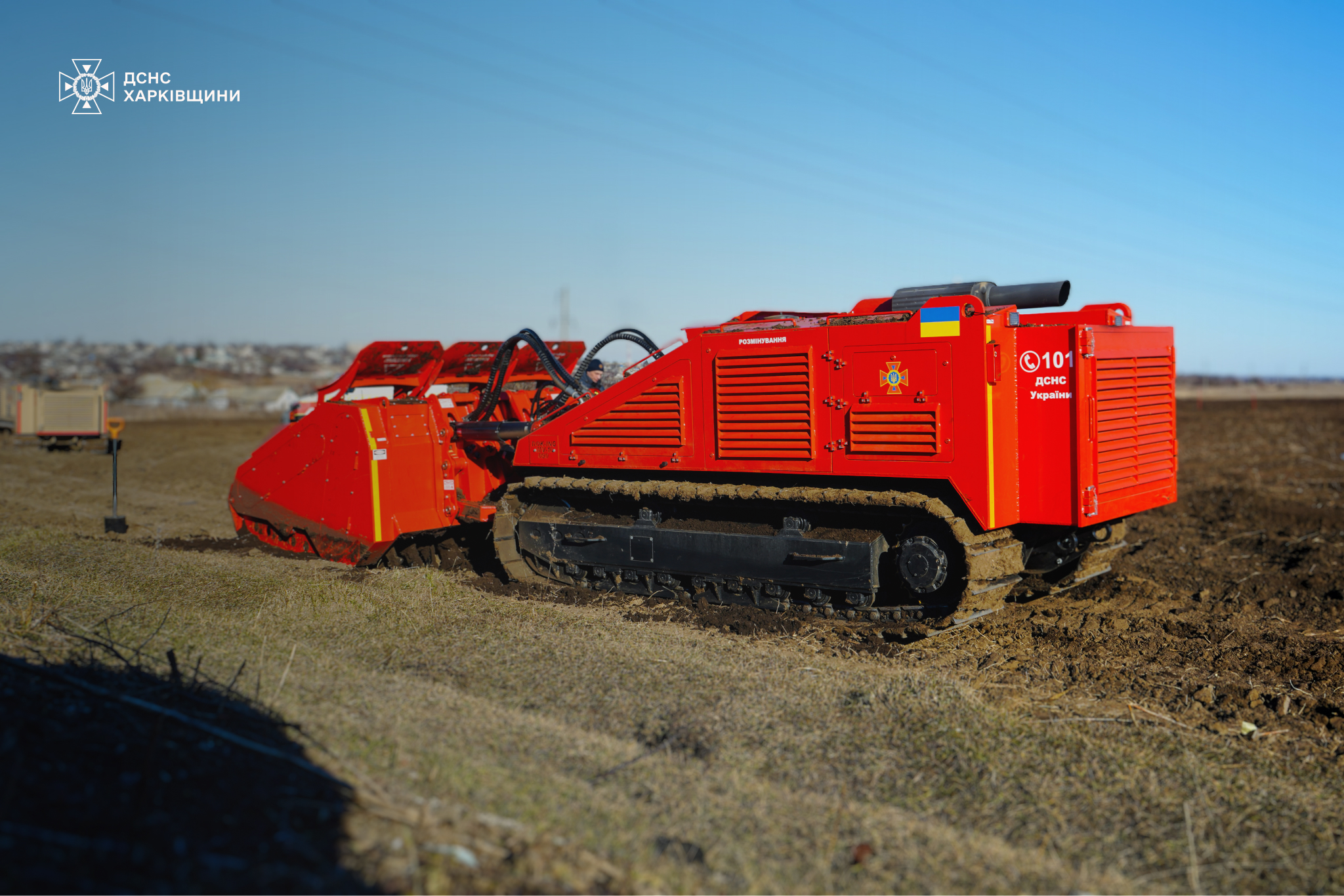
Remotely controlled vehicle for demining in Kharkiv Oblast

A US-supplied M1A1 Abrams tank was destroyed by a mine near Avdiivka, the fourth recorded loss of its kind by Ukraine.

The SBU arrested a resident of Vinnytsia Oblast on suspicion of spying for Russia.

UK Foreign Secretary David Cameron proposed a "ring swap" in which Germany would give the UK Taurus missiles in exchange for Storm Shadow missiles that would then be sent to Ukraine. German foreign minister Annalena Baerbock said she was "open" to the idea, although she has also supported sending Tauruses directly to Ukraine.

=== 12 March ===
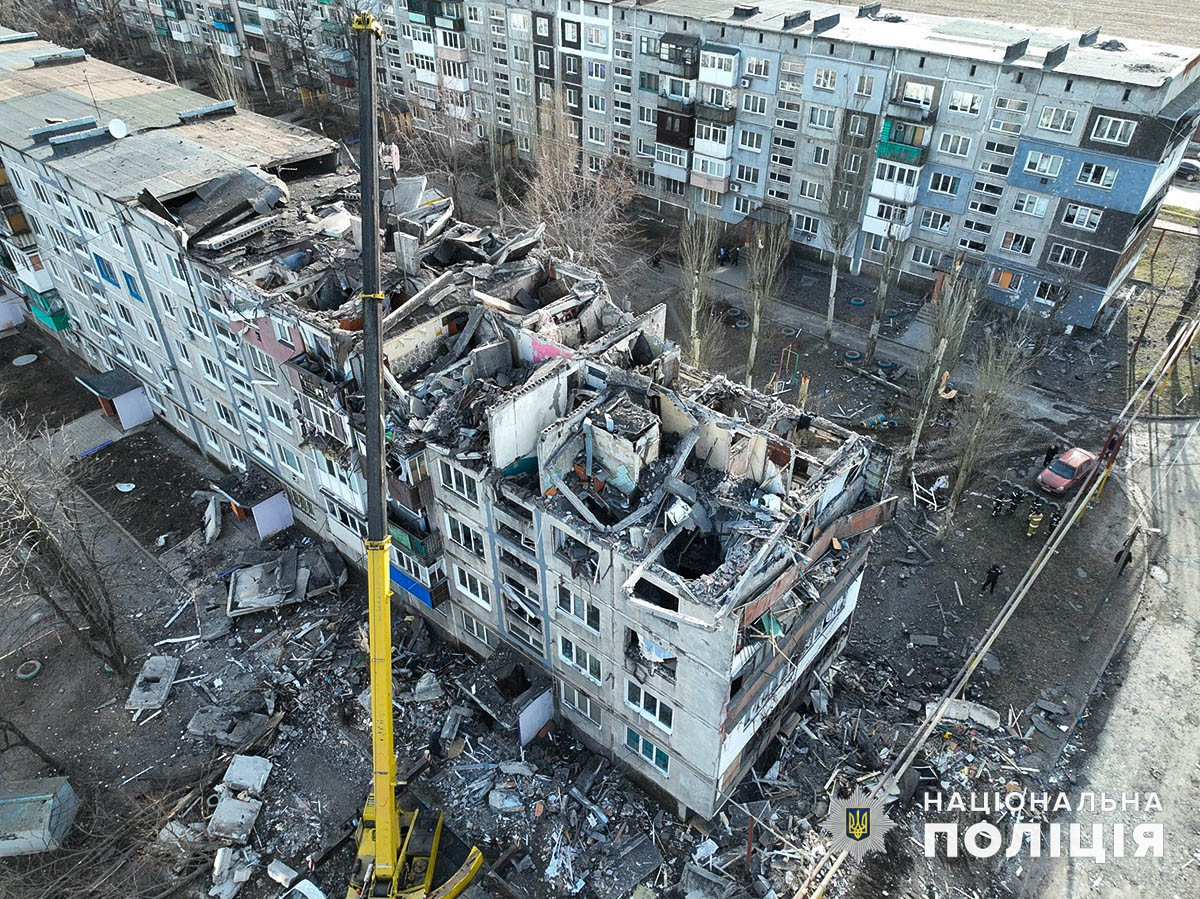
Residential building in Myrnohrad after the strike

The Freedom of Russia Legion, the Russian Volunteer Corps and the Sibir Battalion launched a cross-border incursion into Russia from Ukraine and claimed to have destroyed a Russian armored personnel carrier in Tyotkino, Kursk Oblast, which they also claimed to have taken over, along with the village of Lozovaya Rudka, Belgorod Oblast. The Russian government claimed to have repelled the attacks.

Russian authorities claimed that drone strikes caused fires at oil depots in Nizhny Novgorod and Oryol Oblasts, while another drone caused a power outage in Belgorod Oblast and struck the administration building of Belgorod city. Several other drones were also reportedly shot down over Moscow, Leningrad, Bryansk, Kursk, Tula and Voronezh Oblasts.

Russia claimed to have taken the village of Nevelske, Donetsk Oblast.

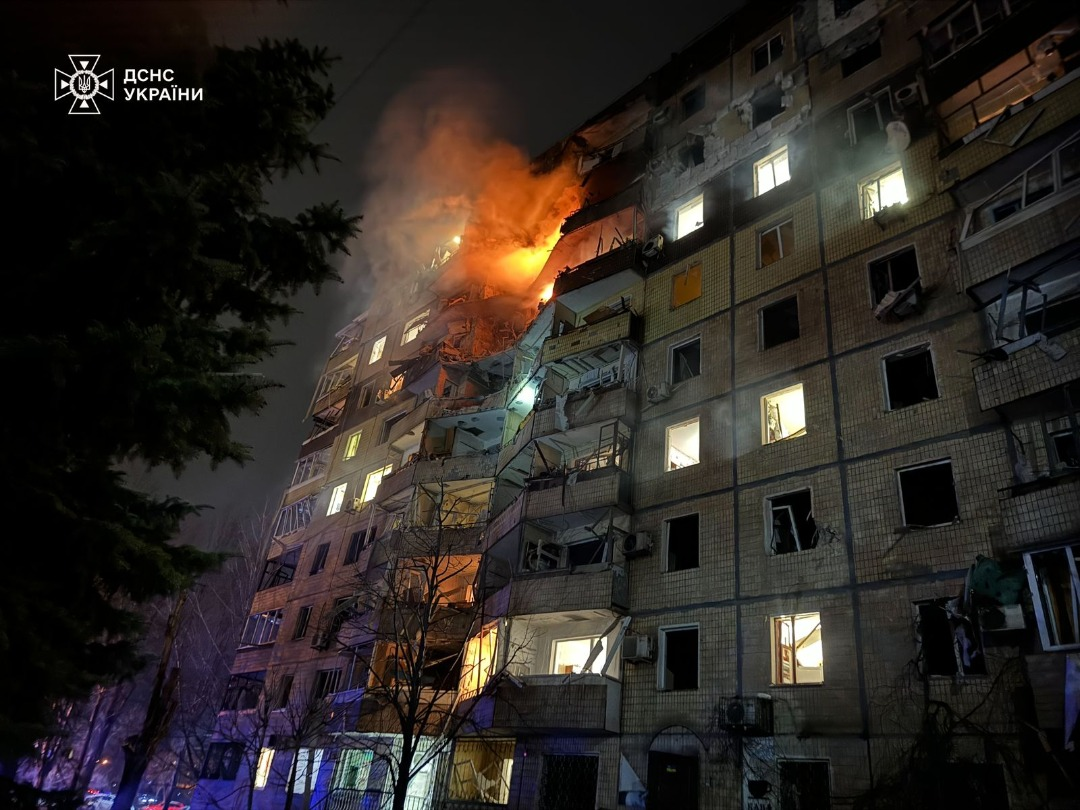
Residential building in Kryvyi Rih after the strike

Six people were killed and 50 others were injured in a Russian airstrike on Kryvyi Rih, while one person was killed in a separate attack near Kupiansk. Two people were killed in a Russian airstrike in Myrnohrad.

HUR commander Kyrylo Budanov said that Ukraine was planning a "serious operation" in Crimea.

The SBU said that it had uncovered a pro-Russian disinformation network organized by the FSB in Kyiv which had 15 members, four of which, including a priest of the UOC-MP, were arrested.

The US government announced that it was preparing a $400 million military aid package for Ukraine from surplus Pentagon funds.

=== 13 March ===
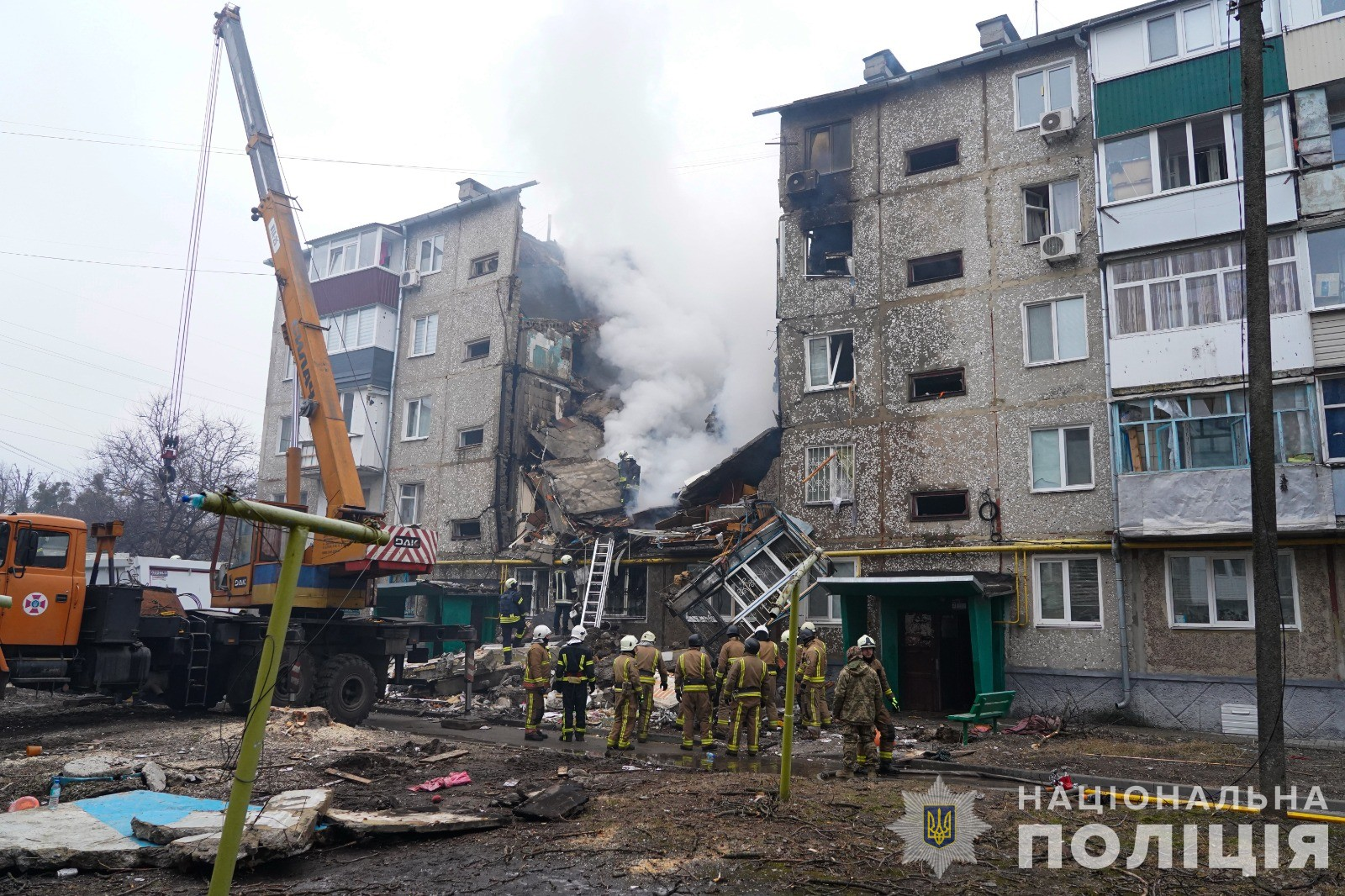
Residential building in Sumy after the strike

Russian forces claimed to have shot down around 60 drones over the country. Drones set fire to Rosneft's oil refinery in Ryazan, the seventh largest in Russia, causing injuries according to the regional governor. Another drone was shot down over the Kirishi refinery, Russia's second largest, without causing damage or injuries. Thirty drones were shot down over Voronezh Oblast, causing "minor damage". In Belgorod Oblast, drone debris cut power and a gas pipeline. Putin accused Ukraine of trying to disrupt the 2024 Russian presidential election.

The Freedom of Russia Legion and other anti-Putin groups called for residents of Kursk and Belgorod to evacuate as more strikes would be conducted against industrial infrastructure in a joint statement.

Three people were killed in a Russian drone strike in Sumy. One person was killed by a helicopter strike in Velyka Pysarivka.

The Ukrainian 3rd Assault Brigade claimed to have killed or wounded 500 Russian soldiers and to have destroyed 20 tanks and armored vehicles on the Avdiivka front since the fall of the city. They also claimed that Russia had "lost a regiment’s worth of soldiers", but that numerically superior Russian forces were unrelenting.

=== 14 March ===
Russian officials claimed Ukraine fired eight missiles at Belgorod Oblast, killing two people and injuring 12 others.

Anti-Kremlin armed groups staged an incursion into Kursk Oblast.

The Ukrainian military said it had repelled an attempted landing by Russian forces at the west bank of the Dnipro River near the Antonivskyi Bridge.

Two people were killed in a Russian drone strike in Vinnytsia Oblast.

The SBU arrested a resident of Kharkiv Oblast on suspicion of plotting acts of sabotage for Russia.

=== 15 March ===
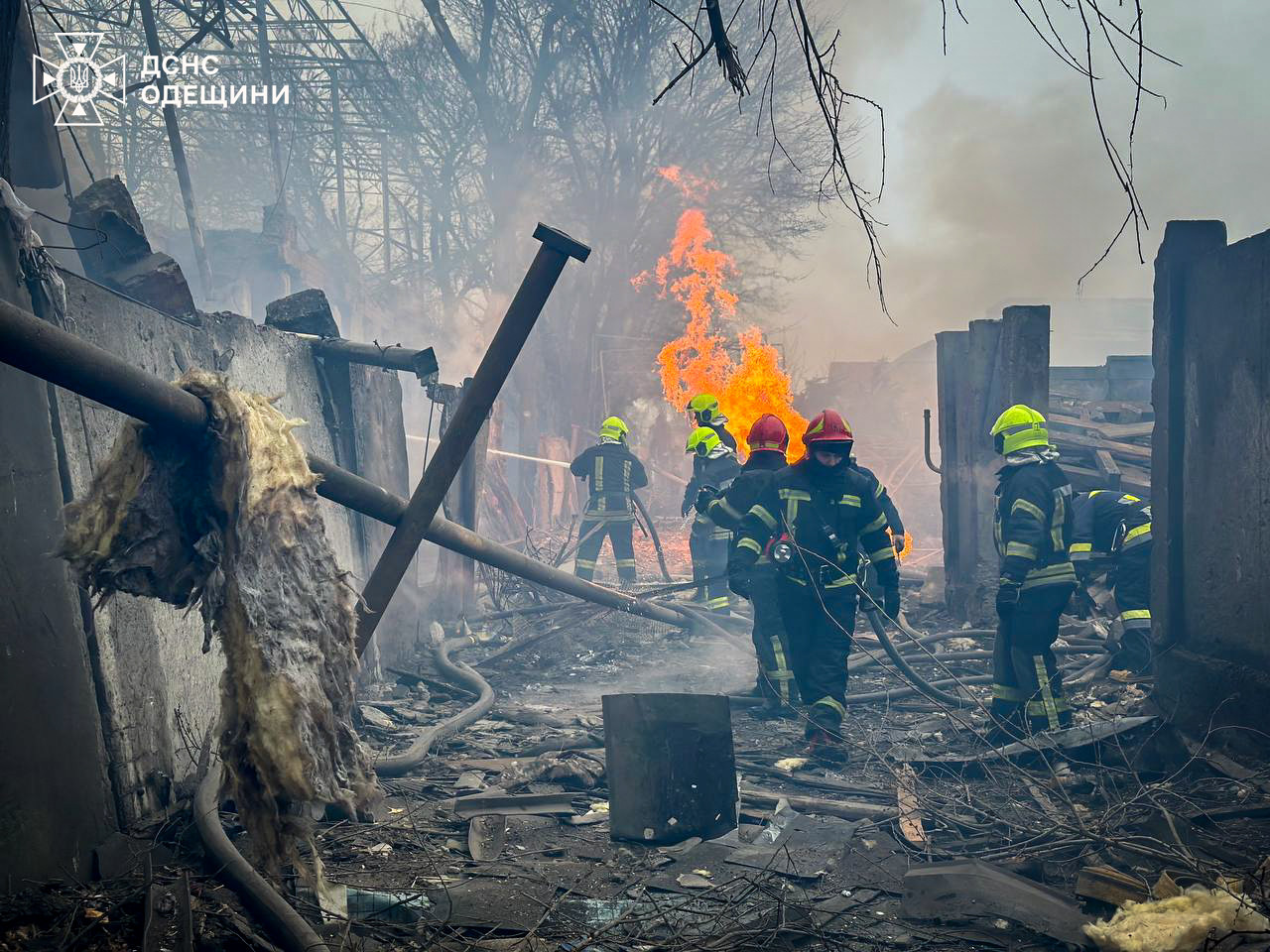
Fire in Odesa after the strike

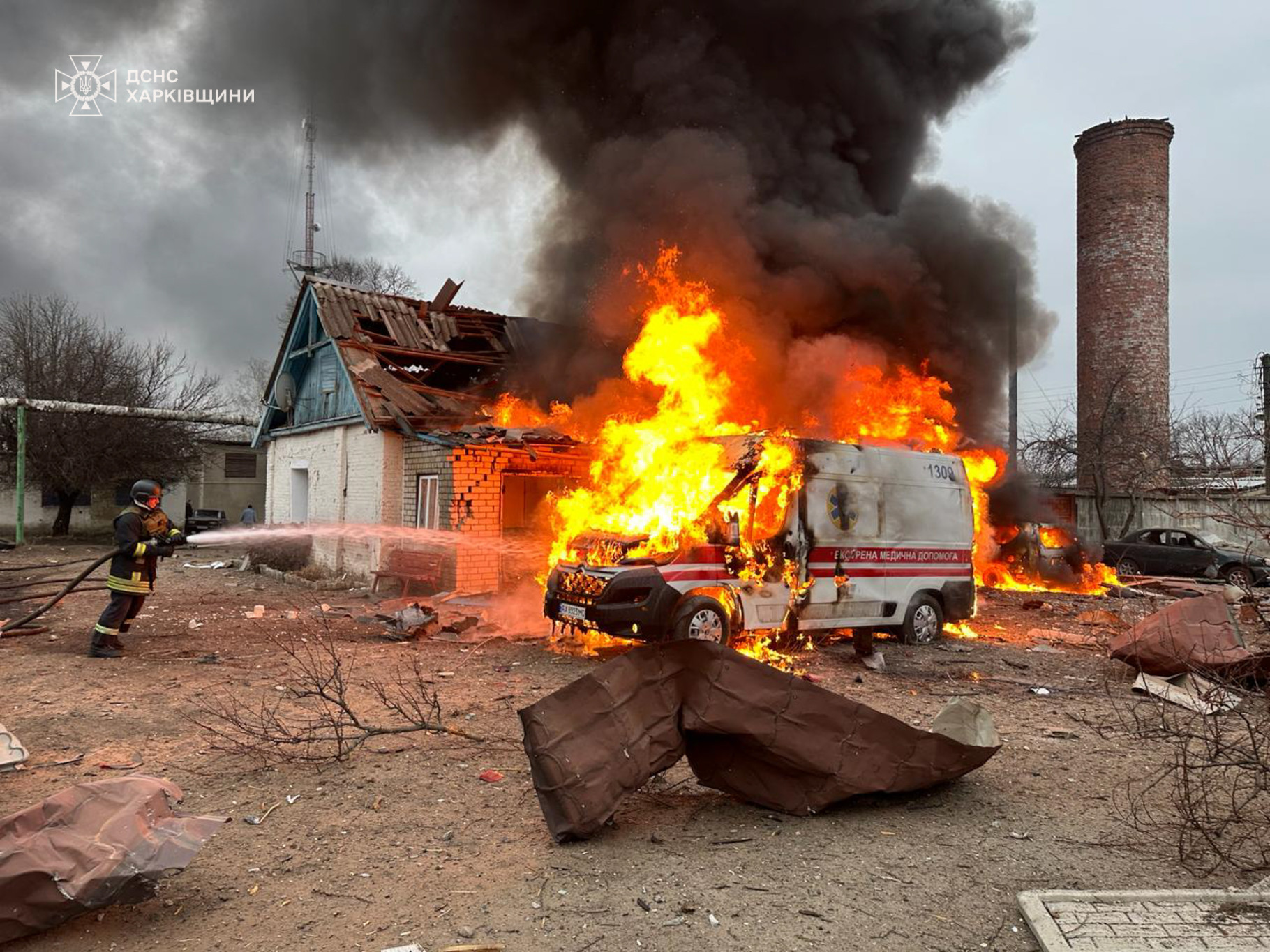
Medical center in Zolochiv, Kharkiv Oblast after the strike on 15 March

Twenty-one people were killed and 73 others were injured in a Russian double tap missile strike on Odesa.

One person was killed by Russian shelling in Zaporizhzhia Oblast.

The Russian-installed mayor of Donetsk claimed that three children were killed by Ukrainian shelling in the city.

Ukrainian partisans claimed to have carried out a bombing near a polling station in Skadovsk, occupied Kherson Oblast that was being used for the 2024 Russian presidential election, injuring five Russian soldiers.

Mass evacuations were ordered in the northern part of Sumy Oblast due to Russian shelling.

Ukrainian military commander Colonel-General Oleksandr Syrskyi confirmed that Ukrainian forces had begun rotating units that had been at the front "for a long time", with fresh units.

Ukraine carried out a drone strike on an oil refinery in Kaluga Oblast. The regional governor, Vladislav Shapsha, said that four drones were shot down and denied any damage or casualties.

The governor of Belgorod Oblast claimed that a member of the region's territorial defense force was killed and two others were injured by Ukrainian shelling.

The FSB arrested a Russian national who had previously worked for the Freedom of Russia Legion on suspicion of launching drones at targets in Moscow on behalf of Ukraine.

Portugal announced 100 million euros towards the Czech initiative to purchase artillery ammunition for Ukraine.

Ukraine announced the repatriation of the remains of 100 of its soldiers killed in combat from Russia.

German Chancellor Scholz confirmed that the EU would use the profits from seized Russian assets to fund weapons for Ukraine.

=== 16 March ===
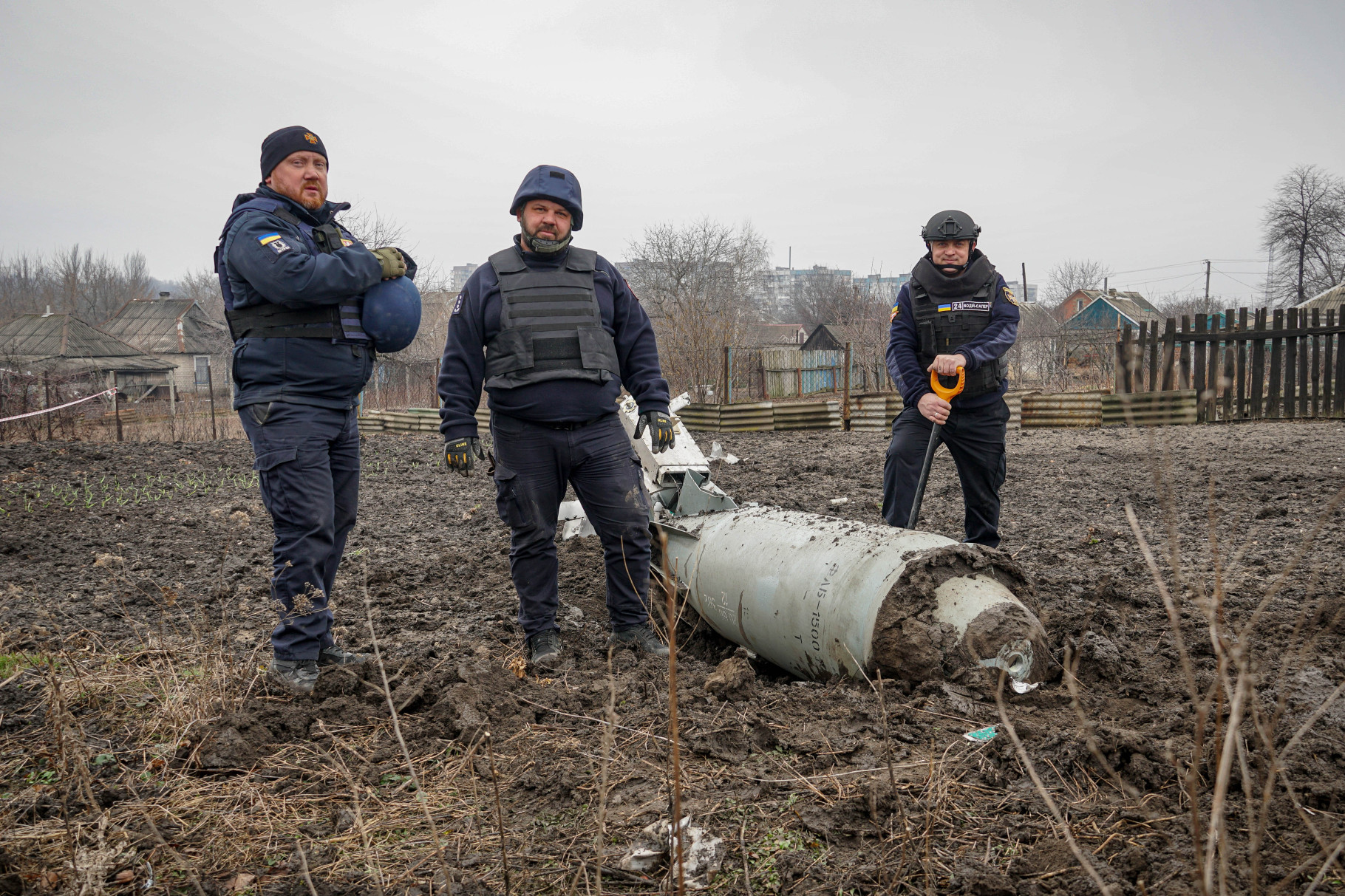
Non-exploded Russian 1.5-ton bomb FAB-1500 in Selydove (Donetsk Oblast)

In Russia, the governor of Samara Oblast claimed that Ukrainian drones set fire to the Syzran oil refinery and attacked another facility.

The governor of Belgorod Oblast claimed that two people were killed and three others were injured by Ukrainian shelling in Belgorod city, while five others were injured in a drone strike on a car in Glotovo. The Russian military also claimed to have killed 30 members of "Ukrainian sabotage and reconnaissance groups" that it intercepted entering the country from Sumy Oblast.

The Russian-installed governor of Kherson Oblast claimed that one person was killed and four others were injured in a Ukrainian drone strike in Kakhovka, while TASS reported that a Ukrainian drone struck a polling station being used for the 2024 Russian presidential election in Zaporizhzhia Oblast.

One person was killed by Russian shelling in Donetsk Oblast.

=== 17 March ===
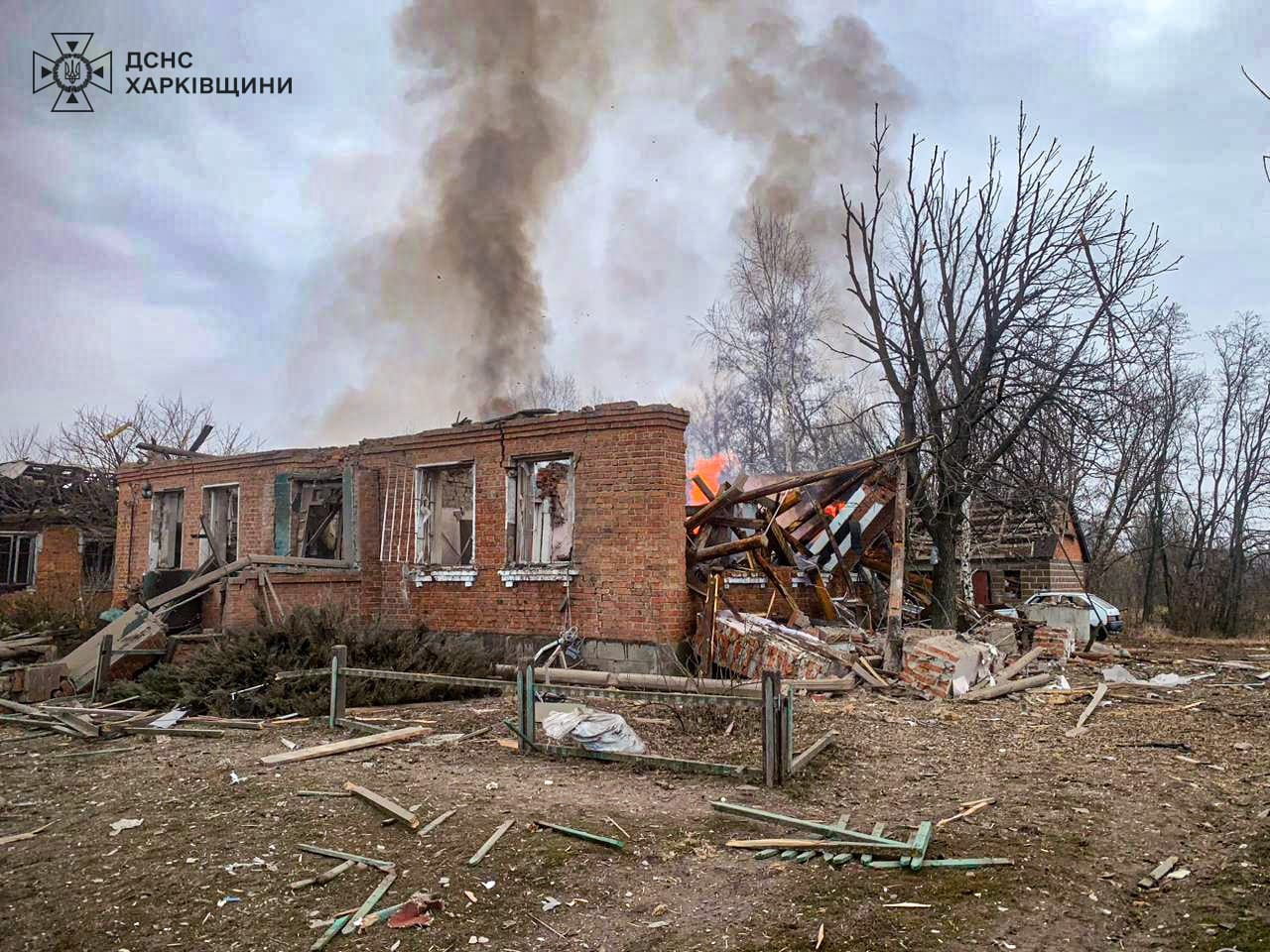
Medical center in Buhaivka village (Kharkiv Oblast) after the strike on 17 March

In Russia, one person died during a suspected drone strike, which caused fire at an oil refinery in Slavyansk-on-Kuban, Krasnodar Krai. A total of 35 drones were claimed to have been shot down in eight regions across the country overnight, including four over Moscow forcing the closure of major airports. A strike on Belgorod Oblast killed a teenage girl while power to the village of Oktyabrsky was cut according to Governor Vyacheslav Gladkov. Russian forces claimed to have shot down 12 rockets fired at the same region.

Two people were killed in separate Russian attacks in Mykolaiv and Velyka Pysarivka. The center of Velyka Pysarivka was destroyed.

Ukraine claimed to have intercepted three Russian sabotage groups who tried to infiltrate the border at Sumy Oblast.

Russian forces claimed to have shot down a Ukrainian Mil Mi-8 military helicopter near the border in Sumy Oblast.

Officials in Transnistria accused Ukraine of launching a drone strike that targeted a helicopter at an air base near Tiraspol, although Moldovan officials disputed the claim, calling it an attempt at provocation.

=== 18 March ===
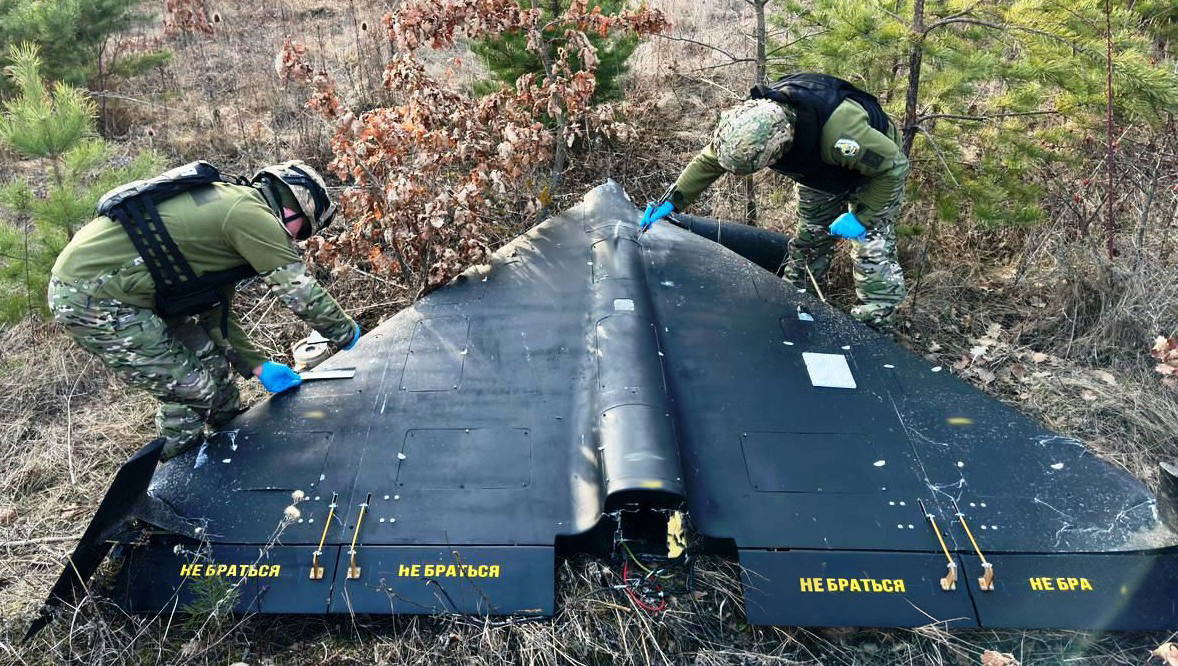
Russian Shahed drone found in Vinnytsia Oblast

In Russia, one person was reportedly injured by Ukrainian shelling in Belgorod. The oblast's governor reported ten Ukrainian Vampire rockets were shot down over the oblast, later adding that two people were killed in an airstrike in Nikolskoye.

=== 19 March ===
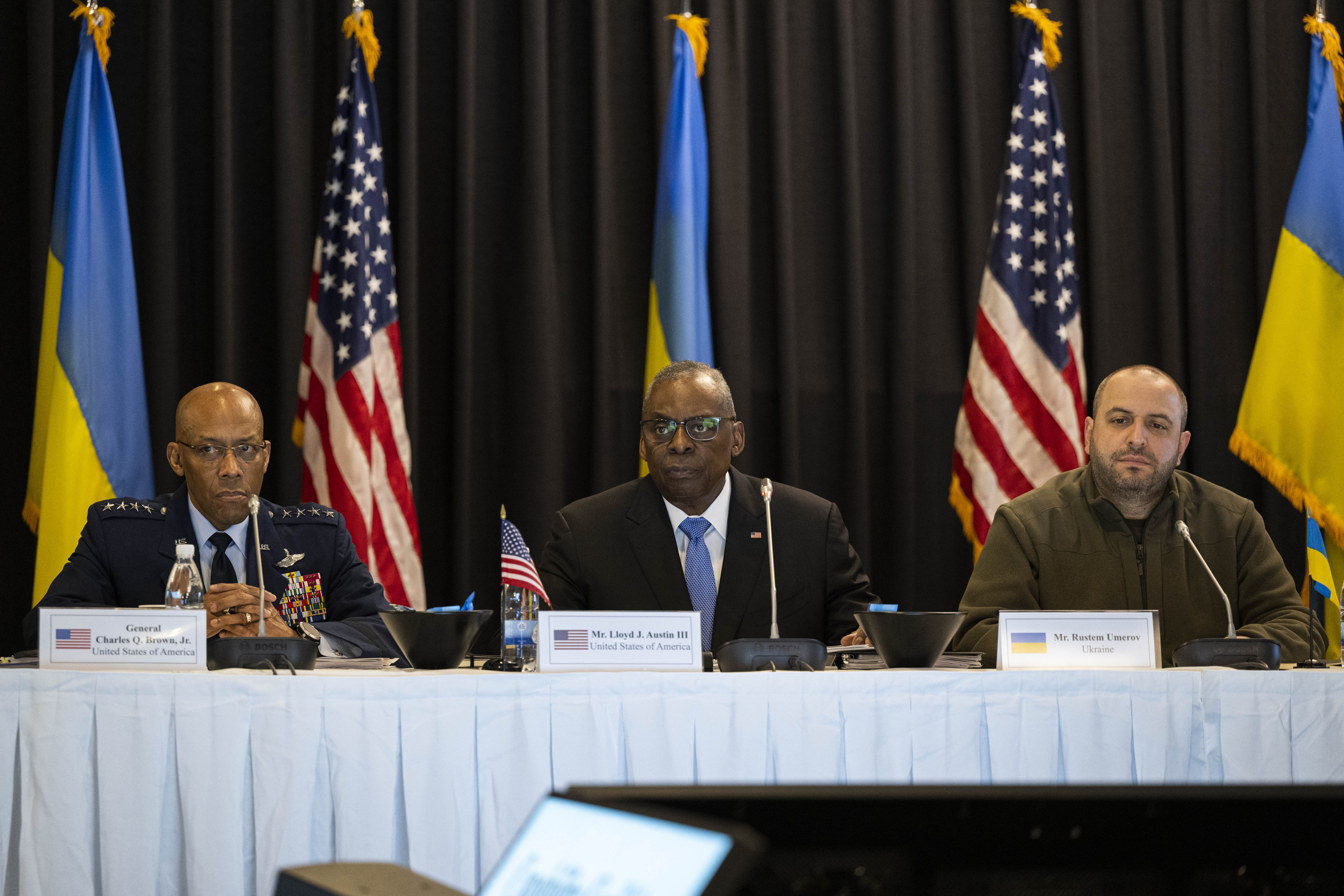
Meeting of Ukraine Defense Contact Group

The Russian state news agency RIA Novosti confirmed that the Commander-in-Chief of the Russian Navy, Nikolai Yevmenov was replaced by Aleksandr Alekseyevich Moiseyev.

Putin ordered the FSB to hunt down and "punish" Russians serving in the Ukrainian military and compared them to the Russian Liberation Army which had collaborated with Nazi Germany during World War II.

Russia claimed to have taken the village of Orlivka, four kilometers west of Avdiivka.

Authorities in Belgorod Oblast announced plans to evacuate 9,000 children from Belgorod city, as well as from Belgorod, Shebekino and Grayvoron districts due to attacks by Ukrainian and anti-Kremlin forces. Another shelling attack killed a kangaroo at Belgorod Zoo.

One person was killed by a Russian airstrike in Sumy Oblast.

Germany announced a €500 million aid package to Ukraine which included some 10,000 artillery shells. German Defence Minister Boris Pistorius indicated that Germany would provide an additional €8 billion in military aid, including 100,000 artillery shells in 2024, 100 armoured fighting vehicles and 100 logistical vehicles. The EU also confirmed a proposal to use profits from seized Russian assets to fund the purchase of weapons for Ukraine.

Russian Director of Foreign Intelligence Sergey Naryshkin claimed that the French Army was planning to send 2,000 soldiers to Ukraine to fight on the frontline.

=== 20 March ===
The Russian Ministry of Defense claimed that its forces had "fully cleared" the village of Kozinka, Belgorod Oblast from "militants", killing 650 of them with "air strikes and artillery fire". German milblogger Julian Roepke assessed that the Russian military had air-dropped high-explosive FAB-500 bombs in its efforts.

Russian forces claimed to have shot down four drones near the Engels-2 air base in Saratov Oblast. Ukrainian intelligence officials said "targets had been hit". Two people were killed by shelling in Belgorod Oblast.

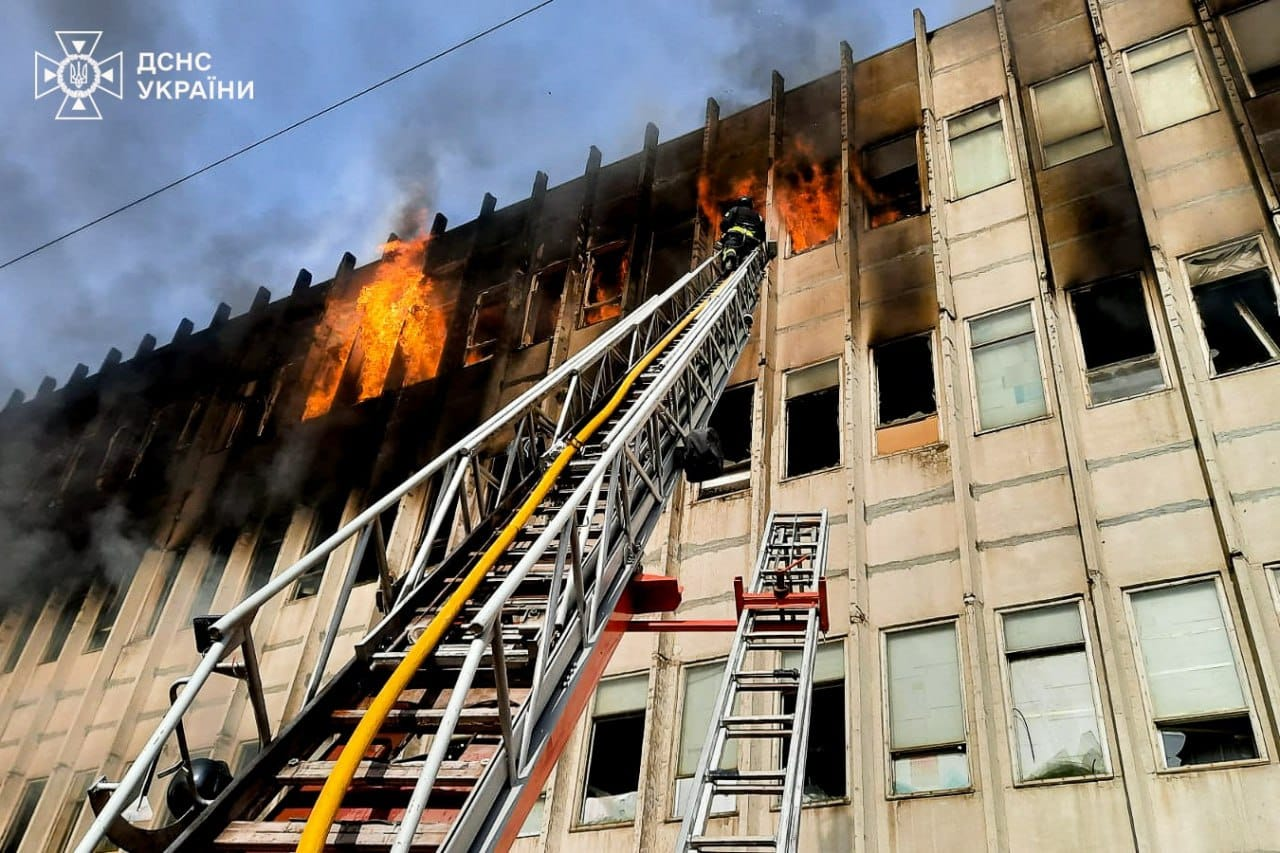
Industrial and office building in Kharkiv after the attack

Two people were killed in a Russian attack in Kherson Oblast. Five people were killed in a missile attack on Kharkiv.

Finland pledged an unspecified number of Jehu-class amphibious assault ships and Jurmo and Uisko-class transport ships to Ukraine via Romania. The Netherlands also announced a military aid package of €350 million for Ukraine that included air to ground weapons for F-16s and drones.

=== 21 March ===
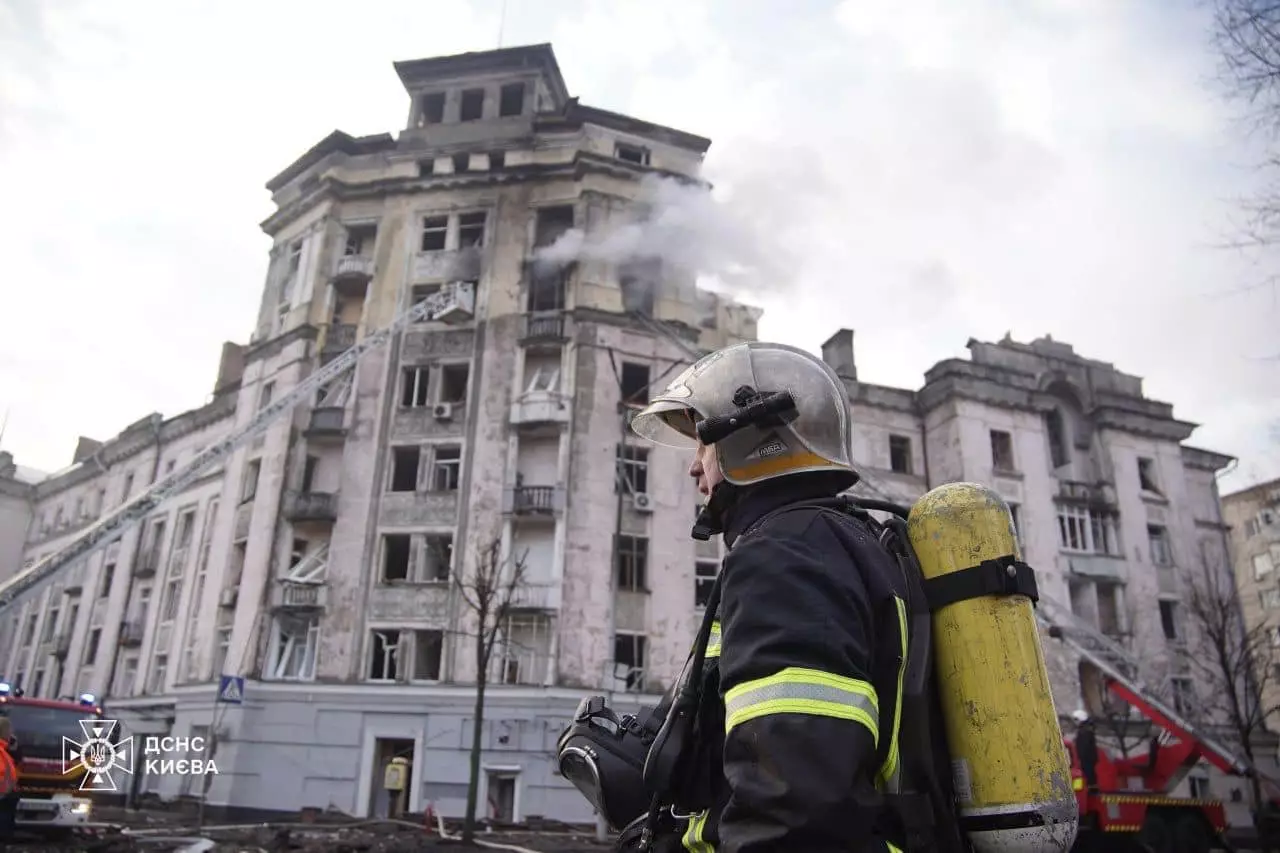
Damaged building in Kyiv

Seventeen people were injured by falling debris in a Russian missile attack on Kyiv. The Ukrainian Air Force claimed to have downed 31 missiles. One person was killed in a missile attack on Mykolaiv.

Russian forces claimed to have taken the village of Tonenke, 10 kilometers west of Avdiivka.

Russia claimed that five people were injured by a Ukrainian rocket attack in Belgorod.

The FSB said that it had arrested four people plotting separate "terrorist attacks" against Russian military sites on behalf of Ukraine.

Ukrainian Army officer Oleksandr Kozlovsky was arrested for embezzling £1 million in funds meant for feeding soldiers.

Australia announced it was joining a "drone coalition" with Latvia and the UK to help Ukraine purchase more drones. Mykhailo Fedorov, Ukrainian Minister of Digital Transformation, said that Ukraine could manufacture two million drones with Western help.

Estonia announced a military aid package of some €20 million to Ukraine that included artillery shells and other specialist equipment.

The Czech Republic delivered its remaining fleet of Soviet Mi-24 helicopters to Ukraine.

=== 22 March ===
Fires on Ukrainian energy facilities after the strikes

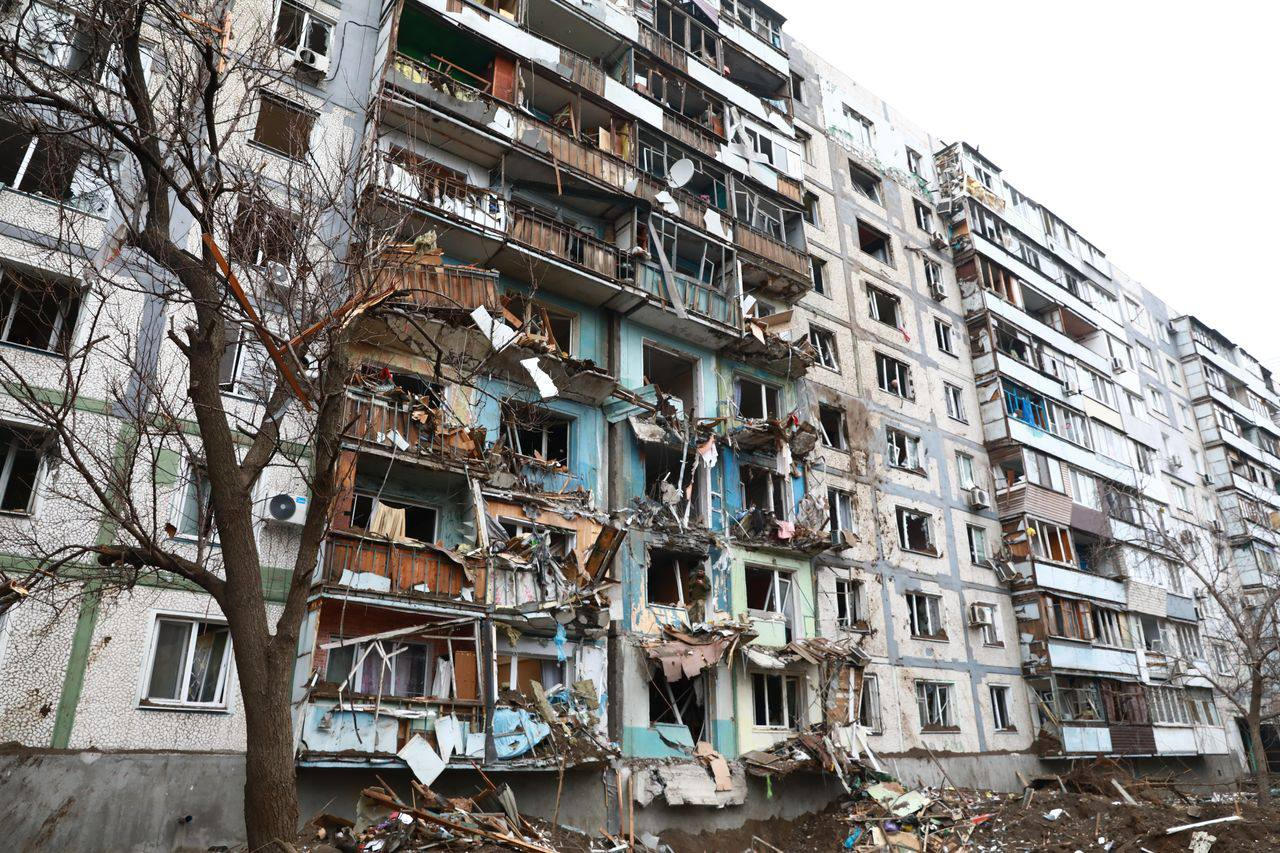
Residential building in Zaporizhzhia after the attack

Russia launched its largest attack on Ukrainian energy infrastructure since the 2022 invasion. 151 missiles and drones were launched, of which 92 were shot down. One attack struck the DniproHES dam in Zaporizhzhia without causing a breach, although power was lost in nine regions, affecting one million people. Across Ukraine, at least five people were killed and 14 injured.

The Russian government said it was in a "state of war" in Ukraine, the first time since the invasion that it had used the term. Previously, it euphemistically called its war against Ukraine a "special military operation".

The FSB claimed to have detained seven men with alleged ties to the Russian Volunteer Corps in Moscow.

The Crocus City Hall in Krasnogorsk, Moscow Oblast was attacked in a mass shooting and arson killing at least 133 people, which the Islamic State – Khorasan Province claimed responsibility for. Russia claimed that the attackers were caught while trying to flee to the border with Ukraine, where they allegedly had contacts. The Ukrainian Foreign Ministry denied the claims, calling them "a planned provocation by the Kremlin to further fuel anti-Ukrainian hysteria in Russian society."

Russia claimed that one person was killed and two were injured after Ukraine fired eight rockets from an RM-70 Vampire at Belgorod Oblast.

France and Germany announced that KNDS will set up a workshop in Ukraine to build spare parts.

=== 23 March ===
Russia claimed to have taken the village of Ivanivske, west of Bakhmut.

Russia claimed that a drone strike set fire to the Kuibyshev oil refinery in Samara Oblast, forcing it to shut down half of its production. It also claimed to have intercepted another drone over the Novokuibyshevsk refinery in the same region, as well as 12 other drones over Belgorod, where one person was killed, and in Bryansk, Saratov and Voronezh Oblasts.

The HUR claimed that several Russian soldiers were killed in an attack by Ukrainian partisans in Melitopol.

Later that evening, Russian forces claimed to have shot down over 10 missiles fired at Crimea. A woman and child were reportedly wounded by falling debris. Ukrainian sources claimed that a Black Sea Fleet communications centre was struck by three Storm Shadow missiles. Ukraine later claimed that it had destroyed two Russian Ropucha-class landing ships, the Yamal and the Azov, and other infrastructure, and damaged the landing ship Konstantin Olshansky, which was seized by Russian forces during its invasion of Crimea in 2014, and the spy ship Ivan Khurs.

=== 24 March ===
Russia launched 28 Shahed drones and 29 cruise missiles at targets in eight regions of Ukraine. 25 Shahed drones were shot down along with 19 cruise missiles. About 10 missiles fired at Kyiv were intercepted causing only minor damage. "Critical infrastructure" in Lviv Oblast was targeted by 20 missiles and seven drones, with at least "two" strikes causing a fire. In Kryvyi Rih some 76,000 people, 3,000 homes, 150 schools and six hospitals were left without heating. Odesa port infrastructure was also damaged. The Polish Air Force was put on alert after a Russian cruise missile spent "39 seconds" in Polish airspace after entering near the village of Oserdow.

=== 25 March ===
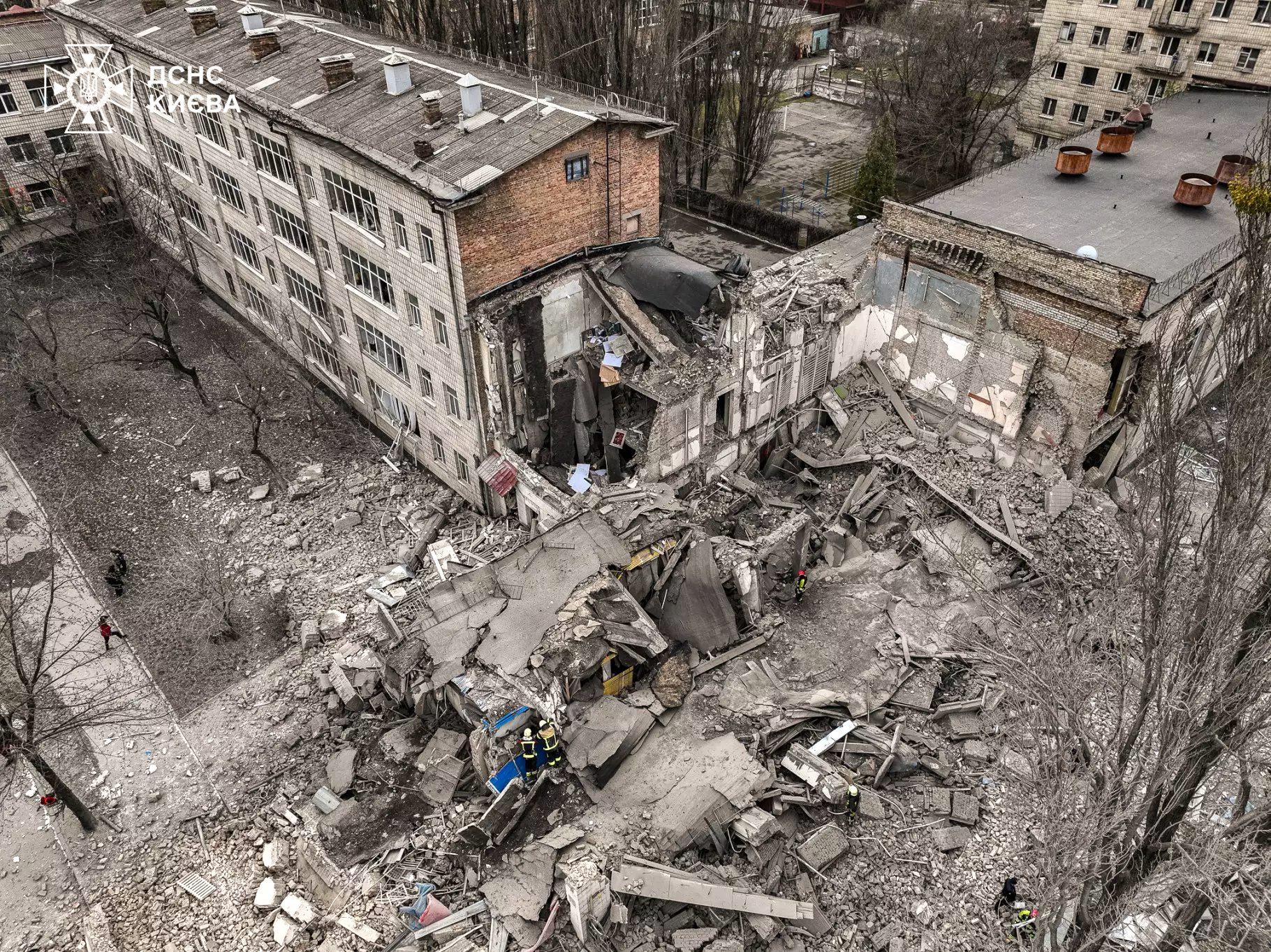
Academy of Decorative-Applied Arts in Kyiv after the attack

The Russian military claimed to have destroyed 11 drones over Rostov Oblast, during which a fire broke out at a thermal power plant in Novocherkassk, causing power outages. While the regional governor denied a link between the fire and Ukrainian drones, a Telegram channel associated with Russian law enforcement said that Ukrainian drones were responsible.

Eleven people were injured in a Russian drone strike on Mykolaiv. Two ballistic missiles were fired on SBU offices in Kyiv. Both missiles were intercepted according to the Ukrainian Air Force, who also said the missiles were fired from Crimea. Other explosions were reported in the capital, damaging property and injuring nine people. The Academy of Decorative-Applied Arts in Kyiv was partially destroyed. One person was killed by Russian shelling in Vovchansk.

Lt. Gen. Vasyl Maliuk, head of the SBU, said that Russia had stopped transporting munitions on the Kerch Bridge due to repeated Ukrainian attacks and reduced rail traffic to 4-5 trains.

=== 26 March ===
Russia claimed that five people were injured by Ukrainian attacks in Belgorod Oblast.

The FSB claimed that a member of the Russian Volunteer Corps died after a bomb he was carrying went off while he was being arrested on charges of plotting to attack a humanitarian aid collection point in Samara Oblast.

The SBU arrested two people in Poltava Oblast on suspicion of plotting sabotage attacks for the FSB.

The EU announced that it would deliver 500,000 shells to Ukraine by the end of March instead of the million shells it originally promised. This did not include shells obtained by the Czech Republic for use in Ukraine.

Zelenskyy dismissed secretary of National Security and Defense Council Oleksiy Danilov, replacing him with Oleksandr Lytvynenko, who was in turn replaced as head of the Foreign Intelligence Service of Ukraine by Oleh Ivashchenko.

A court in Moscow charged the head of the SBU, Vasyl Maliuk, in absentia with "terrorism" over his role in attacks on Russian targets.

The French Government announced a delivery of 78 CAESAR artillery pieces to Ukraine along with additional shells.

A GLSDB was used to strike a house in Chernyanka, Kherson Oblast, where Russian drone operators were based. Ukrainian forces also destroyed two Russian 2S9 Nona 120 mm mortars in Zaporizhzhia Oblast.

The United Nations published their 38th report on the human rights situation in Ukraine, in which they recorded the executions of at least 32 Ukrainian POWs by Russian forces in 12 separate cases between 1 December 2023 to 29 February 2024.

=== 27 March ===
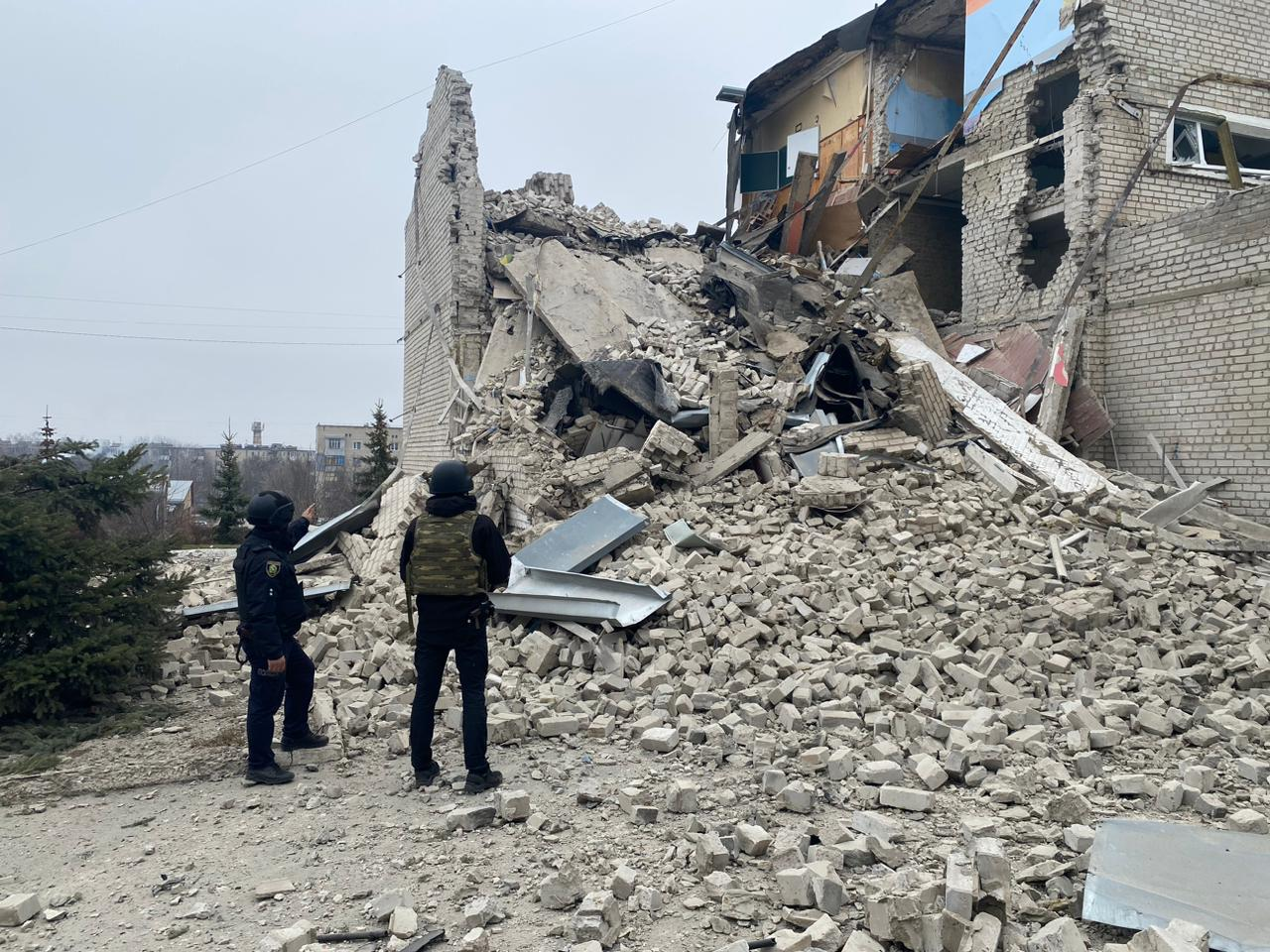
Gymnasium in Izium (Kharkiv region) after drone attack on 27 March

Russia claimed to have stopped a Ukrainian drone strike on Belgorod, shooting down 18 rockets; several homes were damaged and one person was injured.

Two people were killed in separate Russian attacks in Dnipropetrovsk, Kharkiv and Kherson Oblasts.

The SBU arrested two people in Kyiv and Odesa on suspicion of spying for Russia.

The ISW reported that Russian opposition outlet Mobilization News posted a video appeal from Storm-Z fighters from Kaluga Oblast, who claimed that the Russian command had sent their unit of 230 people to the frontline, of whom only 38 survived combat.

Patriarch Kirill, head of the Russian Orthodox Church, declared the war in Ukraine a "Holy War" for Russia.

=== 28 March ===
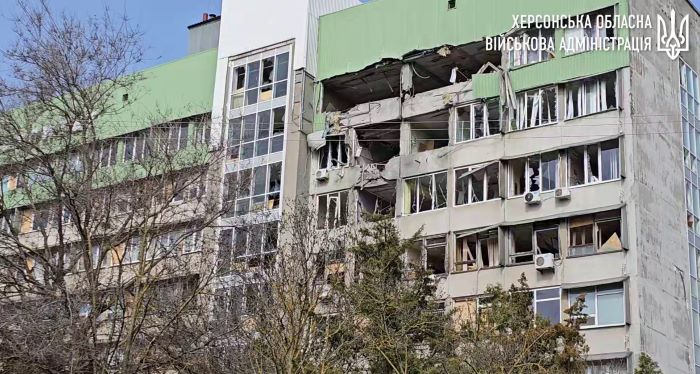
Kherson State University after shelling on 28 March

Three people were killed in separate Russian attacks in Donetsk, Kharkiv and Kherson Oblasts.

Germany delivered a new military aid package to Ukraine that included five Warthog repair and recovery armored vehicles, nine Warthog command armored vehicles, one Dachs armored engineer vehicle, 18,000 155-mm artillery shells, 24,000 rounds of 40 mm ammunition, 2,056 RGW 90 Matador anti-tank weapons, 14 Vector and 30 RQ-35 Heidrun reconnaissance drones, six Wisent mine-clearing tanks, one Bergepanzer armored recovery vehicle, six Zetros tankers, a Satcom surveillance system, 70 GMG grenade launchers, nine mine plows and two emergency power generators.

A Russian Su-35 crashed into the sea near Sevastopol. The pilot was rescued uninjured. The cause of the crash was unclear.

=== 29 March ===
Russia claimed that 17 buildings were damaged by shelling in Belgorod. One person was killed in the city after a drone crashed into an apartment and his wife was injured.

The Ukrainian interior ministry claimed that some 99 drones and missiles were launched at various targets across 10 regions. Fifty-six Shahed drones and 26 missiles were intercepted according to the Ukrainian Air Force, damaging property and injuring several people. Three power plants were damaged, resulting in blackouts.

Ukraine announced the repatriation of the remains of 121 of its soldiers killed in combat from Russia in exchange for the remains of 29 Russian soldiers killed.

Zelenskyy appointed former security council secretary Oleksiy Danilov as the next Ukrainian ambassador to Moldova.

Four residents of Russian-occupied territories in Ukraine were sentenced to 15 years' imprisonment by a Ukrainian court after being captured in Robotyne while fighting for Russia.

Ukraine placed Transnistrian foreign minister Vitaly Ignatiev on its wanted list on charges of making "public calls to change the Ukrainian state border or its territories" and collaborating with Russia.

=== 30 March ===
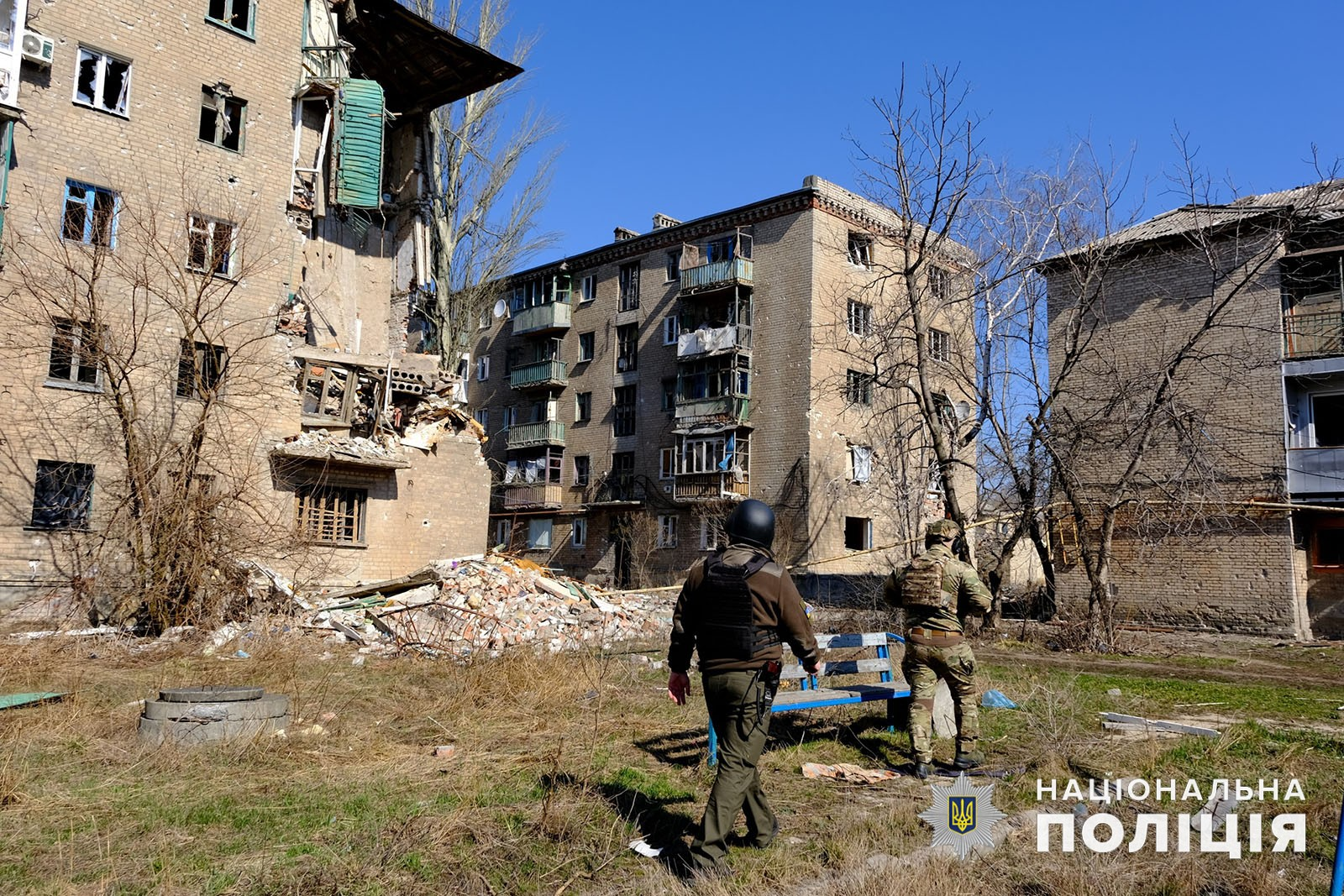
Semi-destroyed Chasiv Yar, about 4 km from the front line

Two people were killed by Russian shelling in Krasnohorivka.

The French Defence ministry announced a new military aid package for Ukraine which included a new batch of Aster 30 missiles and old but “still operational” military vehicles. The French government was working with MBDA to speed up the construction of Aster missiles would serve MBDA with an “injunction” to “build up its ammunition supplies”.

The Ukrainian private energy firm DTEK said that 80% of its generating capacity had been lost after two weeks of Russian attacks.

In Russia, five thousand children were evacuated from Belgorod Oblast due to Ukrainian attacks.

The ISW reported that Ukrainian forces had repelled an attack by the Russian 6th Tank Regiment of the 90th Guards Tank Division near Avdiivka in what was the largest Russian armoured assault since October 2023. Ukraine claimed to have destroyed 12 tanks and eight BMP/IFVs, including both T-62s and T-90s. At least 20 corpses were shown lying near the knocked-out vehicles.

Ukrainian Prime Minister Denys Shmyhal announced the first batch of artillery ammunition, purchased by the Czech Republic, will arrive in April.

=== 31 March ===
Russia launched a series of overnight airstrikes on Ukrainian energy infrastructure facilities, connected to the manufacture and repair of military equipment according to Russian officials, killing two people in Lviv Oblast.

The Russian defence ministry claimed to have shot down three drones over Yaroslavl Oblast. A further 10 rockets over Belgorod Oblast were intercepted, with its governor saying that 18 homes were damaged and a woman killed during the attack.

== See also ==
- 2023 in Russia
- 2024 in Russia
- 2023 in Ukraine
- 2024 in Ukraine
- Outline of the Russo-Ukrainian War
- Bibliography of Ukrainian history
- War crimes in the Russian invasion of Ukraine
- List of wars involving Russia
