= 2024 in Russia =

- Decades: 2000s; 2010s; 2020s
- See also: History of Russia; Timeline of Russian history; List of years in Russia

Events in the year 2024 in Russia.

== Incumbents ==
- President – Vladimir Putin
- Prime Minister – Mikhail Mishustin

=== Governors ===
- Amur Oblast: Vasily Orlov (ER)
- Arkhangelsk Oblast: Alexander Tsybulsky (ER)
- Astrakhan Oblast: Igor Babushkin (ER)
- Belgorod Oblast: Vyacheslav Gladkov (ER)
- Bryansk Oblast: Alexander Bogomaz (ER)
- Chelyabinsk Oblast: Alexey Teksler (ER)
- Irkutsk Oblast: Igor Kobzev (ER)
- Ivanovo Oblast: Stanislav Voskresensky (ER)
- Kaliningrad Oblast: Anton Alikhanov (until May 14, ER), Alexey Besprozvannykh (starting May 15, ER)
- Kaluga Oblast: Vladislav Shapsha (ER)
- Kemerovo Oblast: Sergey Tsivilyov (until May 14, ER), Ilya Seredyuk (starting May 15, ER)
- Kirov Oblast: Alexander Sokolov (ER)
- Kostroma Oblast: Sergey Sitnikov (ER)
- Kurgan Oblast: Vadim Shumkov (ER)
- Kursk Oblast: Roman Starovoyt (until May 14, ER), Alexey Smirnov (starting May 15, ER)
- Leningrad Oblast: Alexander Drozdenko (ER)
- Lipetsk Oblast: Igor Artamonov (ER)
- Magadan Oblast: Sergey Nosov (ER)
- Moscow Oblast: Andrey Vorobyov (ER)
- Murmansk Oblast: Andrey Chibis (ER)
- Nizhny Novgorod Oblast: Gleb Nikitin (ER)
- Novgorod Oblast: Andrey Nikitin (ER)
- Novosibirsk Oblast: Andrey Travnikov (ER)
- Omsk Oblast: Vitaliy Khotsenko (ER)
- Orenburg Oblast: Denis Pasler (ER)
- Oryol Oblast: Andrey Klychkov (CPRF)
- Penza Oblast: Oleg Melnichenko (ER)
- Pskov Oblast: Mikhail Vedernikov (ER)
- Rostov Oblast: Vasily Golubev (until November 4, ER), Yury Slyusar (Acting, ER, starting November 4)
- Ryazan Oblast: Pavel Malkov (ER)
- Sakhalin Oblast: Valery Limarenko (ER)
- Samara Oblast: Dmitry Azarov (until May 31, ER), Vyacheslav Fedorishchev (starting May 31, ER)
- Saratov Oblast: Roman Busargin (ER)
- Smolensk Oblast: Vasily Anokhin (ER)
- Tambov Oblast: Maxim Egorov (until November 4, ER), Yevgeny Perfilov (Acting, LDPR, starting November 4)
- Tomsk Oblast: Vladimir Mazur (ER)
- Tula Oblast: Alexey Dyumin (until May 14, Independent / ER ally), Dmitry Milyaev (starting May 15, ER)
- Tver Oblast: Igor Rudenya (ER)
- Tyumen Oblast: Aleksandr Moor (ER)
- Ulyanovsk Oblast: Alexey Russkikh (CPRF)
- Vladimir Oblast: Alexander Avdeyev (ER)
- Volgograd Oblast: Andrey Bocharov (ER)
- Vologda Oblast: Georgy Filimonov (ER)
- Voronezh Oblast: Alexander Gusev (ER)
- Yaroslavl Oblast: Mikhail Yevrayev (ER)
- Jewish Autonomous Oblast: Rostislav Goldstein (until November 5, ER), Maria Kostyuk (Acting, ER, starting November 5)

== Ongoing ==
- Russo-Ukrainian War
  - Russian invasion of Ukraine (2022–present)
  - Timeline of the Russian invasion of Ukraine (1 December 2023 – present)

== Events ==
=== January ===
- 2 January - A Russian Air Force aircraft accidentally releases its explosive ordnance on the village of Petropavlovka, Voronezh Oblast, injuring four people and damaging six buildings.
- 3 January – Ukraine and Russia complete their first prisoner exchange in nearly five months, releasing over 200 people on each side, facilitated by mediation from the United Arab Emirates.
- 4 January – President Putin issues a decree granting Russian citizenship to foreigners who fight for Russia in the Russo-Ukrainian war and their families.
- 8 January – A pileup in snowy conditions involving 50 vehicles on the Moscow–Saint Petersburg motorway near Novgorod kills four people and injures six others.
- 9 January – Russia places exiled tycoon Mikhail Khodorkovsky on a wanted list over comments he made regarding the Russo-Ukrainian war.
- 17 January – 2024 Bashkortostan protests: Thousands of people protest the trial of Bashkir activist Fail Alsynov in Baymak, Bashkortostan. Clashes with police are reported.
- 21 January – A terminal of Russian gas producer Novatek catches fire in Ust-Luga, in the Gulf of Finland, due to a suspected Ukrainian drone attack.
- 24 January – Korochansky Il-76 crash: A Russian Ilyushin IL-76 military transport plane which the Russian defence ministry claimed was carrying 65 Ukrainian prisoners of war, six crew members and three guards, crashes in Korochansky District in Belgorod Oblast, near the Ukrainian border, killing everyone on board.
- 25 January – Assassination of Vladlen Tatarsky: A court in Saint Petersburg sentences Darya Trepova to 27 years in prison for the assassination of Vladlen Tatarsky.
- 31 January – Russia and Ukraine conduct a prisoner exchange on their border with 195 soldiers being returned to Russia, and 207 military personnel and civilians being returned to Ukraine, respectively. The deal is facilitated by the United Arab Emirates.

=== February ===
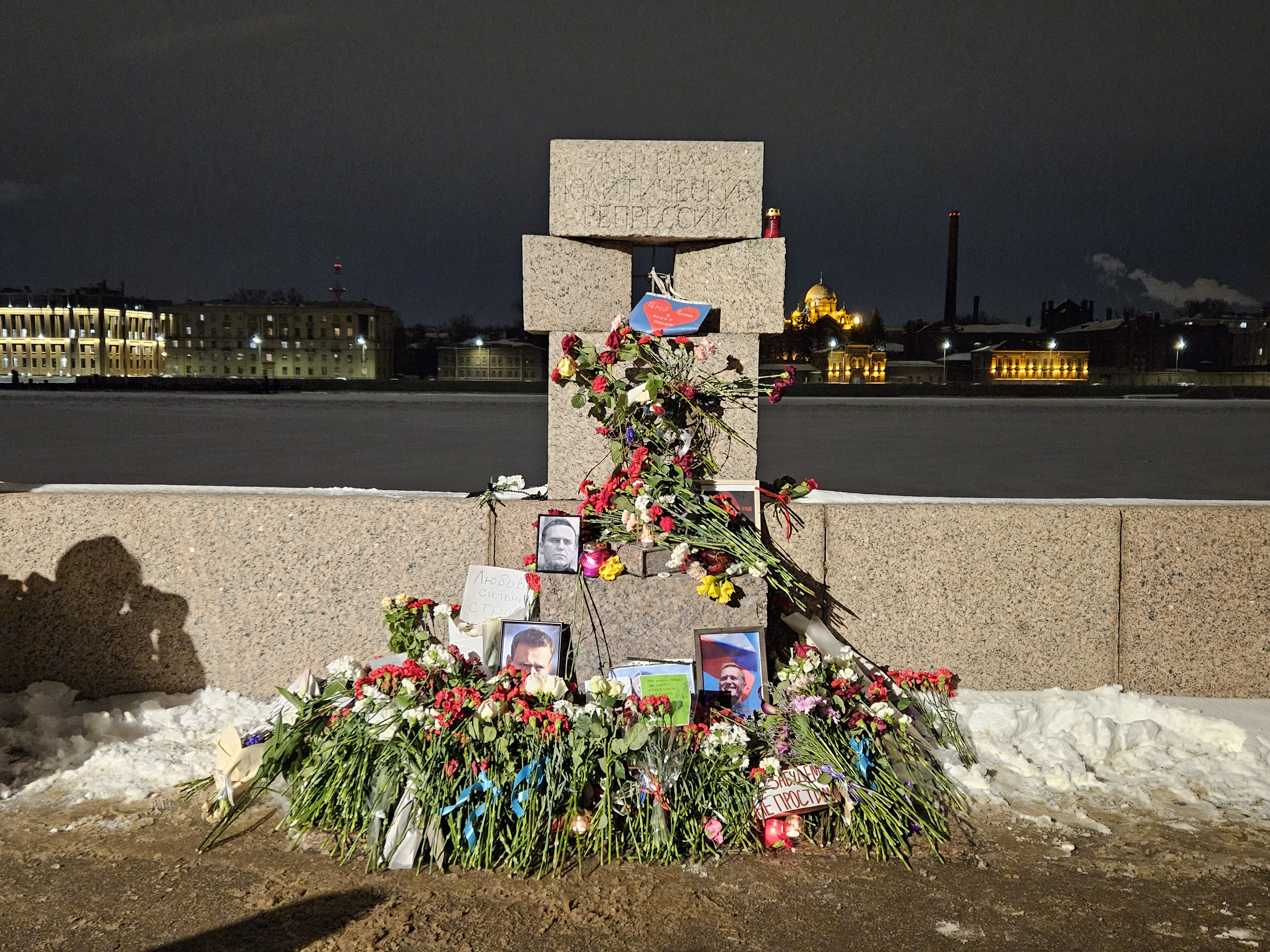
Flowers at the Memorial to the Victims of Political Repression in St. Petersburg following the death of Alexei Navalny, 16 February 2024

- 2 February – A Lukoil oil refinery in Volgograd is attacked by Ukrainian long-range drones, causing a large fire and disrupting operations. Governor of Volgograd Oblast Andrey Bocharov says the attack was repelled by air defences.
- 8 February – The Vladimir Putin Interview: a television interview hosted by the American journalist and political commentator Tucker Carlson with President Putin. It is the first interview with Putin to be granted to a Western journalist since the start of Russo-Ukrainian war in February 2022.
- 16 February – Alexei Navalny, prominent opposition leader and a vocal critic of President Putin, dies while serving a 19-year sentence in prison.
- 20 February – The Federal Security Service arrests Ksenia Karelina, a dual Russian-American citizen, on suspicion of treason.
- 29 February to 7 March – The World Festival of Youth is held at Sirius, Krasnodar Krai.

=== March ===
- 1 March – The funeral of Alexei Navalny is held in Moscow.
- 3 March – Six alleged members of the Islamic State are killed in a shootout with police in Karabulak, Republic of Ingushetia.
- 6 March – Russian journalist Roman Ivanov was sentenced to 7 years in prison for spreading “fake news” about the Russian army.
- 12 March - 7 April:
  - The Freedom of Russia Legion, the Russian Volunteer Corps and the Sibir Battalion launch a cross-border incursion from Ukraine and claim to have seized control over the settlements of Tyotkino, Kursk Oblast, and Lozovaya Rudka, Belgorod Oblast. The Russian government claims to have repelled the attacks.
  - An IL-76 military transport aircraft crashes during takeoff in Ivanovo Oblast, killing all 15 people on board.
- 14 March – A Royal Air Force plane carrying UK Defence Secretary Grant Shapps and several journalists has its GPS signals jammed while flying near Kaliningrad Oblast. Mobile phone signals were also jammed during the flight. The Russian military is suspected of being behind the jamming.
- 15 to 17 March – 2024 Russian presidential election: Incumbent President Vladimir Putin wins a fifth term in office.
- 19 March:
  - A gold mine collapse in Zeysky District, Amur Oblast leaves 13 miners dead.
  - Former deputy education minister Marina Rakova is sentenced to five years' imprisonment for fraud involving the misappropriation of 50 million rubles ($540,000) of Education Ministry funds. Her co-accused, Rector of the Moscow School for the Social and Economic Sciences Sergey Zuev, is given a four-year suspended sentence for the same case.
  - A Russian fishing trawler is reportedly struck by a missile during Baltic Fleet training exercises off the coast of Kaliningrad Oblast, killing three and injuring four others. Russian authorities blame the incident on a fire and claim that only one person was killed.
- 21 March – The Supreme Court of Tatarstan sentences Radik Tagirov, who is identified as the Volga Maniac serial killer, to life in prison for the murders of 31 elderly women in the republic between 2011 and 2012.
- 22 March –
  - The Russian government, through Kremlin spokesman Dmitry Peskov, states in a press conference that the invasion of Ukraine is now a "war" and no longer a "special military operation," the official term used for the war by the Russian government. In another press conference later that day, Peskov clarifies that although the invasion is a war de facto, the Russian government does not yet plan to change its de jure status as a "special military operation".
  - Crocus City Hall attack: At least 151 people are killed and 609 are injured in a shooting and arson attack claimed by the Islamic State in the Crocus City Hall music venue in Krasnogorsk, Moscow Oblast.
- 24 March –
  - A Russian cruise missile violates NATO airspace over Poland, prompting the activation of aircraft from the Polish Air Force.
  - Crocus City Hall attack: Four Tajik men are charged with terrorism. They are brought to Basmanny District court in Moscow, where they are ordered to be held in pre-trial detention until at least 22 May.
- 28 March – A Sukhoi Su-35 crashes into the sea off Sevastopol. The pilot is reported to have safely ejected.
- 29 March – Russia vetoes the continuation of the monitoring of UN sanctions on the North Korean nuclear weapons program.
- 31 March – President Putin signs a decree for a larger than normal spring conscription campaign, calling up 150,000 citizens for military service.

=== April ===
- 1 April – A train collides with a bus at a level-crossing in Yaroslavl Oblast, killing eight people.
- 4 April – The governor of Murmansk Oblast, Andrey Chibis, is severely wounded after being stabbed while meeting with constituents in Apatity. The assailant is reported to be a disgruntled 42-year old local railway worker.
- 5 April – Orsk Dam collapse: A dam failure in Orsk, Orenburg Oblast caused by melting snow results in a flood that inundates 10,000 homes and displaces 10,000 people. Over the succeeding days, floods also caused by the spring thaw occur in Tyumen, Tomsk and Kurgan Oblasts.
- 8 April – One person is killed and five others are injured after a bridge collapses into a railway in Vyazma, Smolensk Oblast.
- 9 April – Four people are sentenced to varying prison terms including life imprisonment for the ritual killings of three people in the Republic of Karelia, Leningrad Oblast and Moscow Oblast in 2016.
- 11 April –
  - Two suspected militants are killed in a counterterrorism operation outside Nalchik, Kabardino-Balkaria.
  - Russia warns its citizens against travelling to the Middle East amid tensions between Iran and Israel.
- 17 April – Russia begins the withdrawal of its peacekeepers from Nagorno-Karabakh.
- 19 April – A Russian Air Force Tu-22M3 is shot down in Russian airspace over Stavropol Krai after launching missiles at targets in Ukraine.
- 22 April:
  - Two police officers are killed and a third is injured following a gun attack in Karachaevsk, Karachay-Cherkessia.
  - Three people are killed in a fire at a machine-building plant in Voronezh.
- 23 April – Deputy Defense Minister Timur Ivanov is arrested on suspicion of bribery.
- 24 April – Russia vetoes a UN Security Council resolution reaffirming a ban on an arms race in outer space under the provisions of the Outer Space Treaty.
- 27 April – Authorities arrest a fifth suspect for the Crocus City Hall attack in March, a Tajik man accused of providing the attackers with financing and communication.
- 28 April – Two police officers are killed and four more injured during a mass shooting at a checkpoint in Karachay-Cherkessia. The five attackers, who are suspected of involvement in the 22 April attack, are also killed in the ensuing shootout.

=== May ===
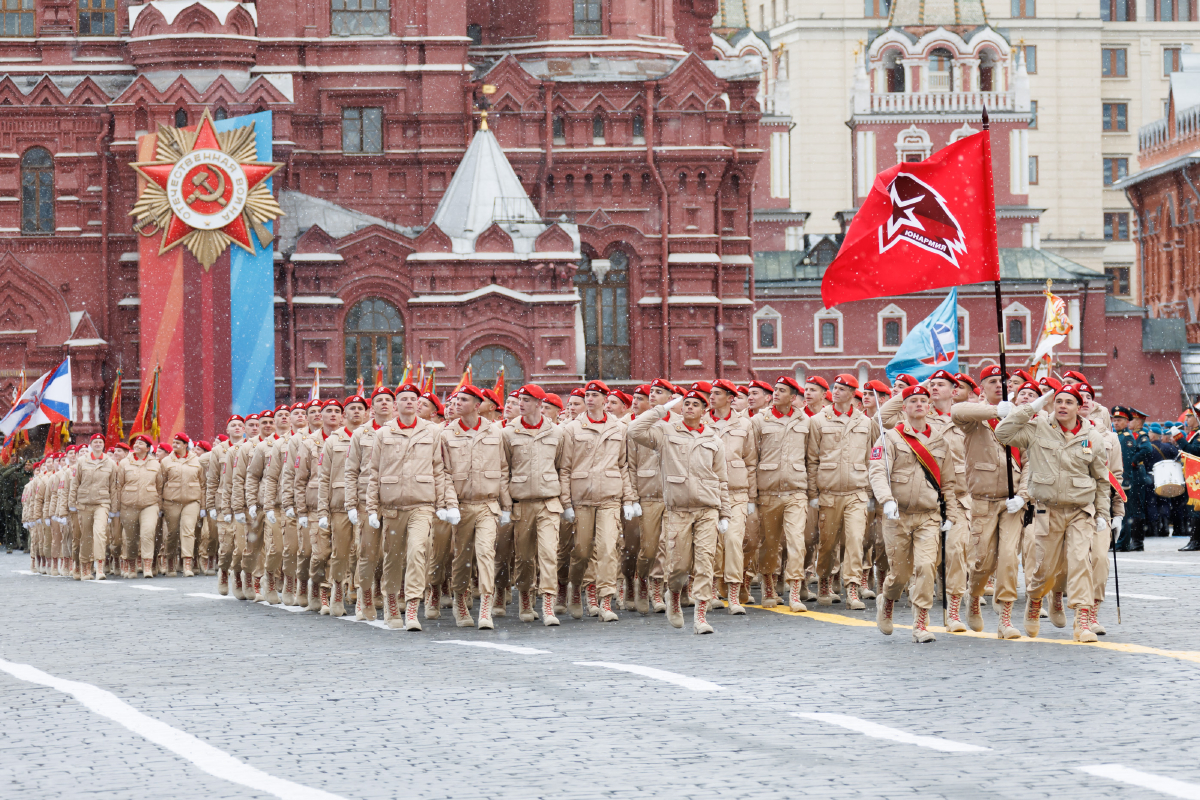
Putin's Young Army on the Red Square during the Moscow Victory Day Parade, 9 May 2024

- 6 May – A state of emergency is declared in Irkutsk Oblast due to wildfires.
- 7 May – Russia declares U.S. nonprofit organization Freedom House an "undesirable organization", effectively outlawing the group, after accusing it of "discrediting the Russian Army" and advocating sanctions against Russia.
- 9 May –
  - A drone strike is reported in Bashkortostan for the first time since the start of the war against Ukraine.
  - Vladimir Putin begins his fifth term as President of Russia.
- 10 May:
  - 2024 Kharkiv offensive: Russia launches an offensive in Ukraine's Kharkiv Oblast, pushing Ukrainian forces back one kilometer from the international border.
  - A bus plunges into the Moyka river in Saint Petersburg, killing seven passengers.
- 12 May:
  - Thirteen people are killed in a suspected Ukrainian missile strike on an apartment in Belgorod.
  - Defence Minister Sergei Shoigu is appointed secretary of the Security Council of Russia and replaced by Deputy Prime Minister Andrey Belousov.
- 14 May –
  - Former head of personnel of the Ministry of Defence Yuri Kuznetsov is arrested for bribery of over ₽1 million. His charges carry up to 15 years of jail time.
  - Russia puts the nuclear capable submarine-launched Bulava intercontinental ballistic missile into service.
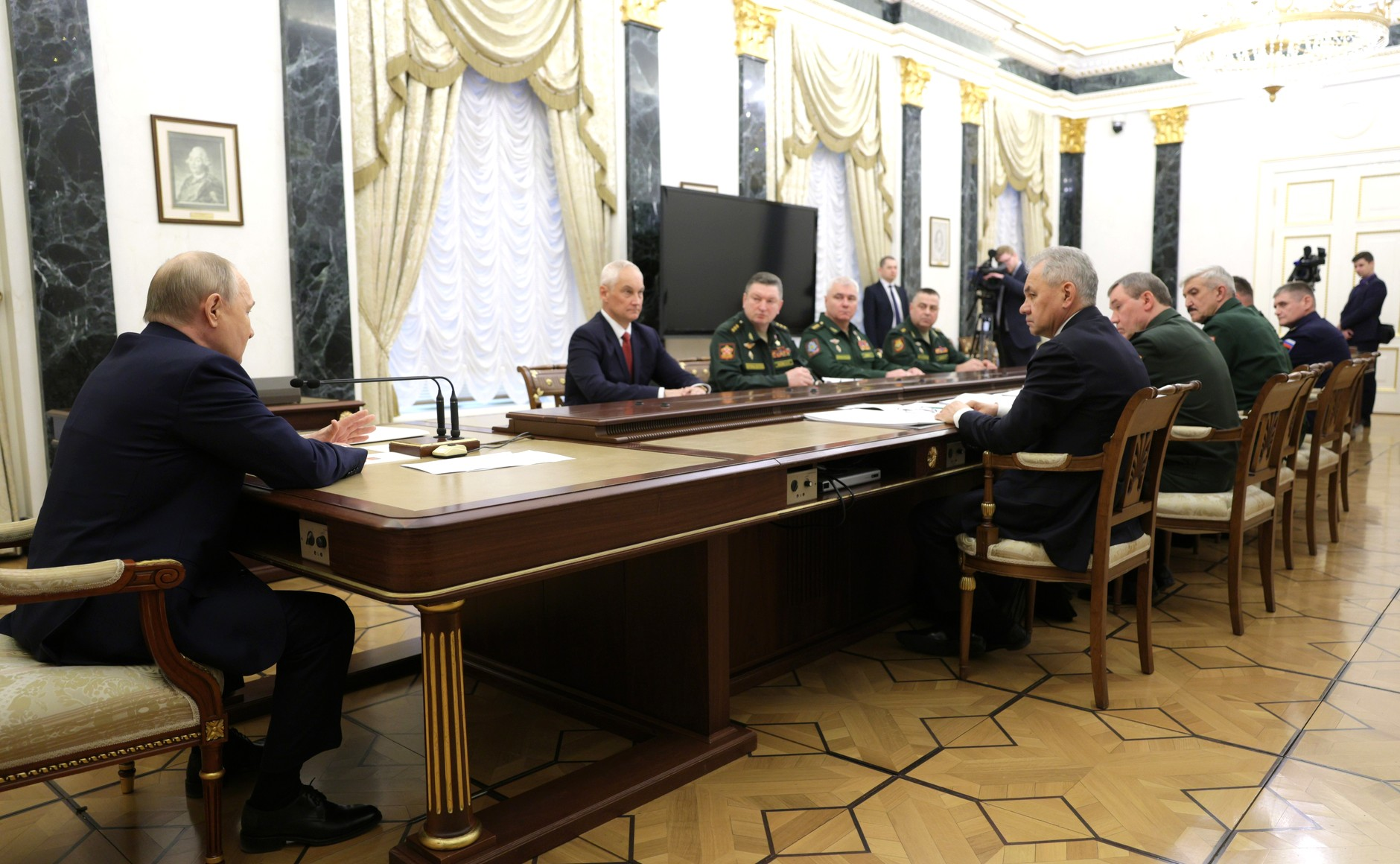
    President Putin with Shoigu, Gerasimov, Belousov, Yevkurov and commanders of Russia's military districts on 15 May 2024
- 16 May – President Vladimir Putin meets with General Secretary of the Chinese Communist Party Xi Jinping in Beijing as part of his two-day visit to China.
- 17 May – A 76-mm artillery shell dating from the Great Patriotic War that was being stored inside a basement of the Budyonny Military Academy of the Signal Corps in Saint Petersburg explodes during cleaning works, injuring seven soldiers.
- 20 May –
  - Valery Fadeyev Chairman of the Presidential Council for Civil Society and Human Rights calls for a Niqab ban in Russia.
  - A court in Novosibirsk sentences a 24-year-old man to 25 years in prison for allegedly plotting an arson attack on a military recruitment office with alleged directions from Ukraine.
- 21 May –
  - A state of emergency is declared in the Sakha Republic due to flooding.
  - A court in Saint Petersburg sentences Anatoly Maslov, a 77-year-old hypersonic missiles expert, to 14 years in prison for state treason.
- 22 May –
  - The United Nations Security Council votes against a resolution introduced by Russia and China banning member states from placing weapons in outer space.
  - A Soyuz-2 rocket carrying the Kosmos 2576 satellite is launched from the Plesetsk Cosmodrome in Arkhangelsk Oblast.
  - The Russian Ministry of Defence proposes to unilaterally adjust Russia's maritime border in the Baltic Sea. However, following comments made by Baltic members of NATO, including Finland and Lithuania, the ministry retracts the proposal.
- 23 May:
  - Deputy Chief of the General Staff Lieutenant-General Vadim Shamarin is arrested on bribery charges.
  - Eight people are killed in a fire at a hostel in Istra, Moscow Oblast.
  - Russia returns six children displaced by the war back to Ukraine, in a deal brokered by Qatar.
- 24 May:
  - The European Union allows Ukraine to use interest funds from frozen Russian bank accounts, totaling €2.5 billion ($2.7 billion) per year.
  - Authorities arrest more than 20 people in connection with the Crocus City Hall attack in March.
- 26 May – A suspected Ukrainian drone attack is recorded for the first time in Orenburg Oblast, targeting a military radar installation near Orsk.
- 30 May – Natalya Komarova resigns as governor of Khanty–Mansi Autonomous Okrug and is replaced by Ruslan Kukharuk.
- 31 May:
  - Twenty-nine cars of a cargo train carrying coal derail along the Trans-Siberian Railway between Seletkan and Ledyanaya in Amur Oblast, causing a wildfire.
  - Dmitry Azarov resigns as governor of Samara Oblast and is replaced by Vyacheslav Fedorishchev.

=== June ===
- 2 June:
  - Russia accuses NATO and the U.S. of "provoking a new level of tension" after some member states allow Ukraine to use Western-supplied weapons to strike targets inside Russia.
  - An unspecified number of deaths and three injuries are reported following a fire at an oil refinery in Ukhta, Komi Republic.
- 4 June:
  - Foreign Minister Sergey Lavrov warns that French military instructors will be "legitimate targets" if they are deployed to Ukraine.
  - Oleg Khorokhordin resigns as head of the Altai Republic and is replaced by Andrey Turchak.
- 5 June:
  - Foreign Minister Sergey Lavrov announces that Russia will dispatch additional military supplies and instructors to Burkina Faso to help them boost its defense capabilities.
  - Russian cosmonaut Oleg Kononenko becomes the first human to spend 1,000 days in outer space.
  - Ostankinsky District Court sentenced Russian streamer Anna Bazhutova to five and a half years in prison on charges of spreading "false information" about the Russian military.
- 6 June:
  - One person is killed and 102 others are injured after two trams collide in Kemerovo.
  - The Investigative Committee of Russia announces the arrest of a French national in Moscow on suspicion of failing to register with authorities as a foreign agent and collecting information on the Russian military.
- 8 June – A suspected Ukrainian drone attack is recorded in North Ossetia for the first time since the war began, with three drones shot down near an air base in Mozdok.
- 11 June:
  - An Su-34 fighter jet crashes during a training flight in the mountains of North Ossetia, killing its two pilots.
  - A state of emergency is declared in the Sakha Republic due to wildfires.
- 12 June:
  - The United States broadens secondary sanctions on foreign financial institutions that did business with any of over 4,500 US-sanctioned Russian entities.
  - Russia completes the withdrawal of its peacekeepers from Nagorno-Karabakh.
  - Two Indians recruited by the Russian army are killed in Ukraine with the Indian foreign ministry urging Moscow to quickly return all Indian nationals who are serving in the Russian army.
- 14 June:
  - President Putin announces that he is ready for a ceasefire if Ukraine withdraws from territories occupied by Russian forces and stops its accession to NATO. Ukraine rejects the offer.
  - Germany vetoes a European Union sanction package that would prevent EU members from re-exporting Russian liquefied natural gas from EU ports and prevent EU companies from selling sanctioned products to Russia.
- 16 June – Rostov-on-Don pre-trial detention center hostage crisis: In a pre-trial detention center in Rostov-on-Don, detainees suspect of membership in the Islamic State take two prison employees hostage, leading to the facility being stormed by the Russian special forces, who kill all six hostage takers.
- 17 June-ongoing – 2024 Russian botulism outbreak: One person dies in Kostroma, while at least 150 people are hospitalised in Moscow following an outbreak of suspected botulism that is blamed on salads prepared by a food delivery company. Eighteen people are also hospitalised in Nizhny Novgorod and Kazan over the same incident.
- 19 June – President Putin visits Pyongyang as part of the first visit of a Russian leader to North Korea since 2000, the two sign an agreement to grant mutual aid and support in case either nation faces aggression.
- 20 June – Two people are killed following a storm caused by a cold front in Moscow.
- 23 June:
  - 2024 Dagestan attack: Militants attack a synagogue in Derbent and two churches in Makhachkala, killing at least 20.
  - Ukrainian drones and missiles kill six in Russia and Crimea in the Crimea attacks (2022–present).
- 24 June – Eight people are killed in a building fire in Fryazino, Moscow Oblast.
- 25 June –
  - The International Criminal Court issues arrest warrants against former defence minister Sergei Shoigu and Chief of the General Staff Valery Gerasimov for war crimes and crimes against humanity pertaining to strikes on Ukrainian energy facilities from 2022 to 2023.
  - The European Court of Human Rights unanimously finds Russia guilty of systematic violations of human rights in the Crimean peninsula.
  - Russia and Ukraine each return 90 prisoners of war in a prisoner exchange mediated by the United Arab Emirates.
  - Russia bans 81 media outlets from access inside the country, including Agence France-Presse and Politico, in retaliation for a European Union ban on Russian media outlets.
- 26 June –
  - A train travelling from Vorkuta to Novorossiysk derails near Inta, Komi Republic, killing three people and injuring 40 others.
  - A Russian satellite breaks up into over 100 pieces of debris near the International Space Station.
- 28 June – Five people are killed during a fire at a two-story tall dormitory in Balashikha, Moscow.

=== July ===
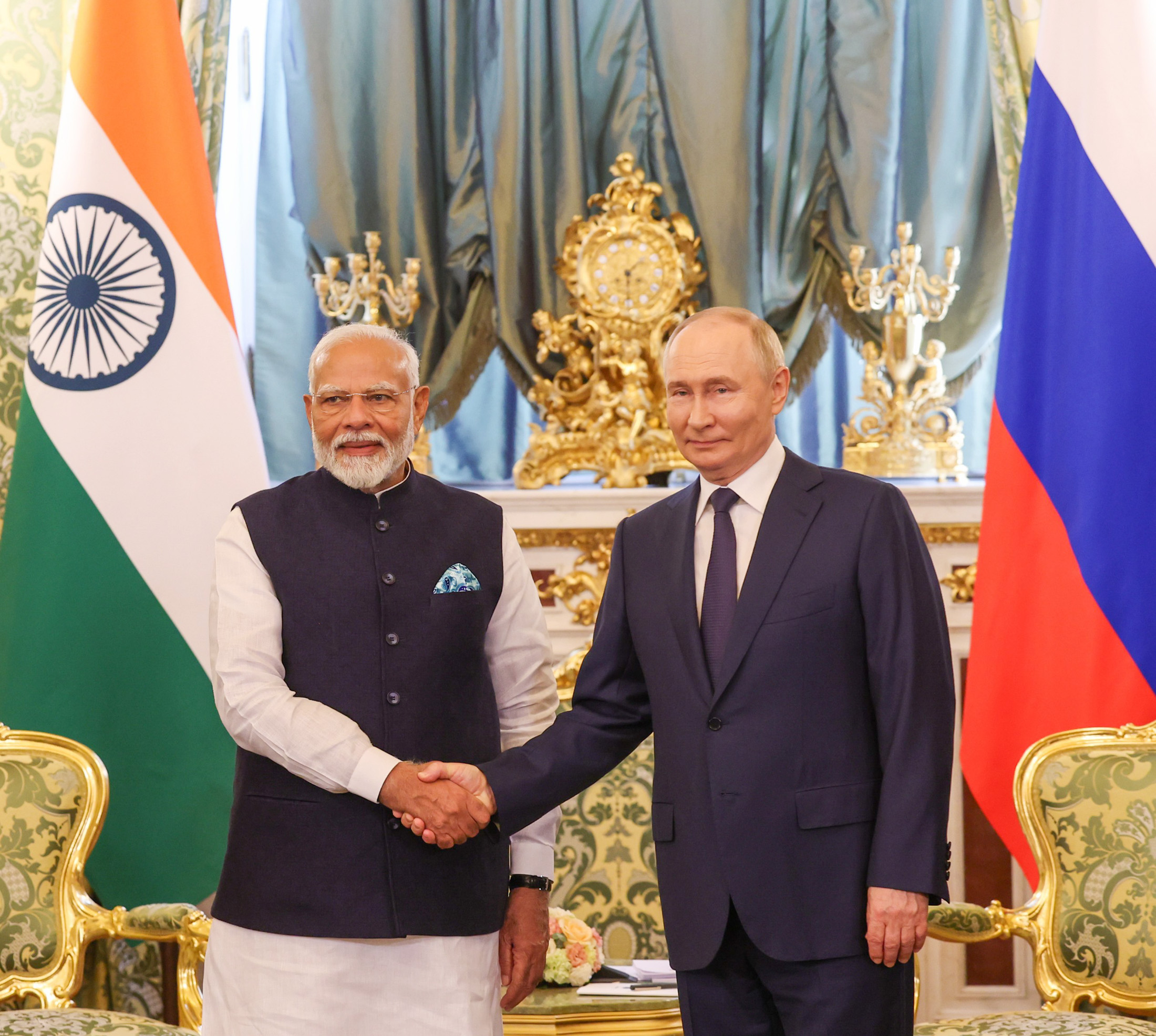
Russian President Vladimir Putin and Indian Prime Minister Narendra Modi in Moscow, 9 July 2024

- 1 July – A state of emergency is declared in Sakha and Tuva due to wildfires.
- 2 July – One person is killed and seven others are injured in a gas explosion at an apartment in Sterlitamak, Bashkortostan.
- 9 July – A court in Moscow issues an arrest warrant for Yulia Navalnaya, the exiled widow of opposition leader Alexei Navalny.
- 11 July – CNN reports that American and German intelligence foiled a Russian plot to assassinate Armin Papperger, the CEO of defence company Rheinmetall.
- 12 July:
  - A Sukhoi Superjet 100 owned by Gazpromavia crashes during a test flight in Kolomensky District, Moscow Oblast, killing its three pilots.
  - At least two soldiers are killed in a shooting at a military deployment site in Belgorod Oblast.
  - President Putin signs into law a bill imposing a 13% progressive wealth tax for those earning up to 2.4 million rubles ($27,500) annually, a 22% income tax on those earning above 50 million rubles ($573,000), and a 5% increase on corporate taxes.
- 13 July – Russia accuses Australia of inciting "anti-Russian paranoia" after Australia charges a Russian-born Australian couple with espionage.
- 14 July – The navies of Russia and China begin joint military drills in Guangdong four days after China was called a "decisive enabler" of Russo-Ukrainian war in a declaration signed by all 32 NATO countries.
- 15 July – Two trains collide in Stary Oskol, Belgorod Oblast, killing one person.
- 16 July – A malfunction causes an emergency shutdown of one of the four reactors at the Rostov Nuclear Power Plant in Rostov Oblast. Background radiation levels are reported as normal.
- 18 July:
  - The Constitutional Court of Russia outlaws the euthanisation of stray animals except in cases of direct threats to humans.
  - State Duma member Mikhail Matveyev is injured in an "attempted murder" in Samara.
- 19 July:
  - A court in Yekaterinburg convicts American journalist Evan Gershkovich of spying and sentences him to 16 years' imprisonment.
  - A court in Kazan convicts Russian-American journalist Alsu Kurmasheva of spreading "false information" regarding the Russian military and sentences her to 6.5 years' imprisonment.
  - The FSB announces the arrest of a Central Asian national in Yessentuki on suspicion of planning a bomb attack on a bus station on behalf of Islamic State.
- 22 July:
  - The Supreme Court of Russia upholds Alexei Navalny's 19 year prison sentence for "extremism" more than five months after his death.
  - A court in Moscow sentences former deputy communications minister Alexei Soldatov to two years' imprisonment for abuse of office relating to the transfer of several IP addresses to a foreign organisation.
- 23 July – A court in Moscow charges a Russian–German lawyer with treason for assisting Russian citizens with obtaining EU residence permits.
- 24 July – A GRU officer and his wife is injured in a car bombing in Moscow.
- 25 July – An Mi-28 helicopter crashes due to a suspected technical malfunction in Zhizdrinsky District, Kaluga Oblast, killing its entire crew.
- 26 July:
  - Former deputy defence minister Dmitry Bulgakov is arrested on charges of corruption.
  - The head of a military logistics company is injured after setting himself on fire in Moscow's Red Square.
  - A dam collapses at the Kliamskoye reservoir in Karabash, Chelyabinsk Oblast, forcing evacuations in the area.
- 27 July – Hackers from the Ministry of Defense of Ukraine escalate "massive" cyberattacks on Russia's largest banks, prohibiting any cash or credit transactions. Cyberattacks also target Russian public transport systems, internet and mobile providers, and social networks.
- 28 July – President Putin threatens to position long-range missiles that could strike throughout Europe following the United States's announcement of plans to set up long-range missiles in Germany beginning in 2026.
- 29 July:
  - A temporary dam along the White Sea-Baltic Canal in the Republic of Karelia collapses, killing two people and destroying 13 homes.
  - A train derails after hitting a truck at a level crossing in Volgograd Oblast, injuring 156 people.
- 31 July – Ukraine demands that Russia explain the death of Ukrainian POW Oleksandr Ishchenko in Russian captivity, who was being tried with 21 other captured Ukrainian troops for being part of the Azov Brigade that Russian prosecutors allege is far-right affiliated.

=== August ===
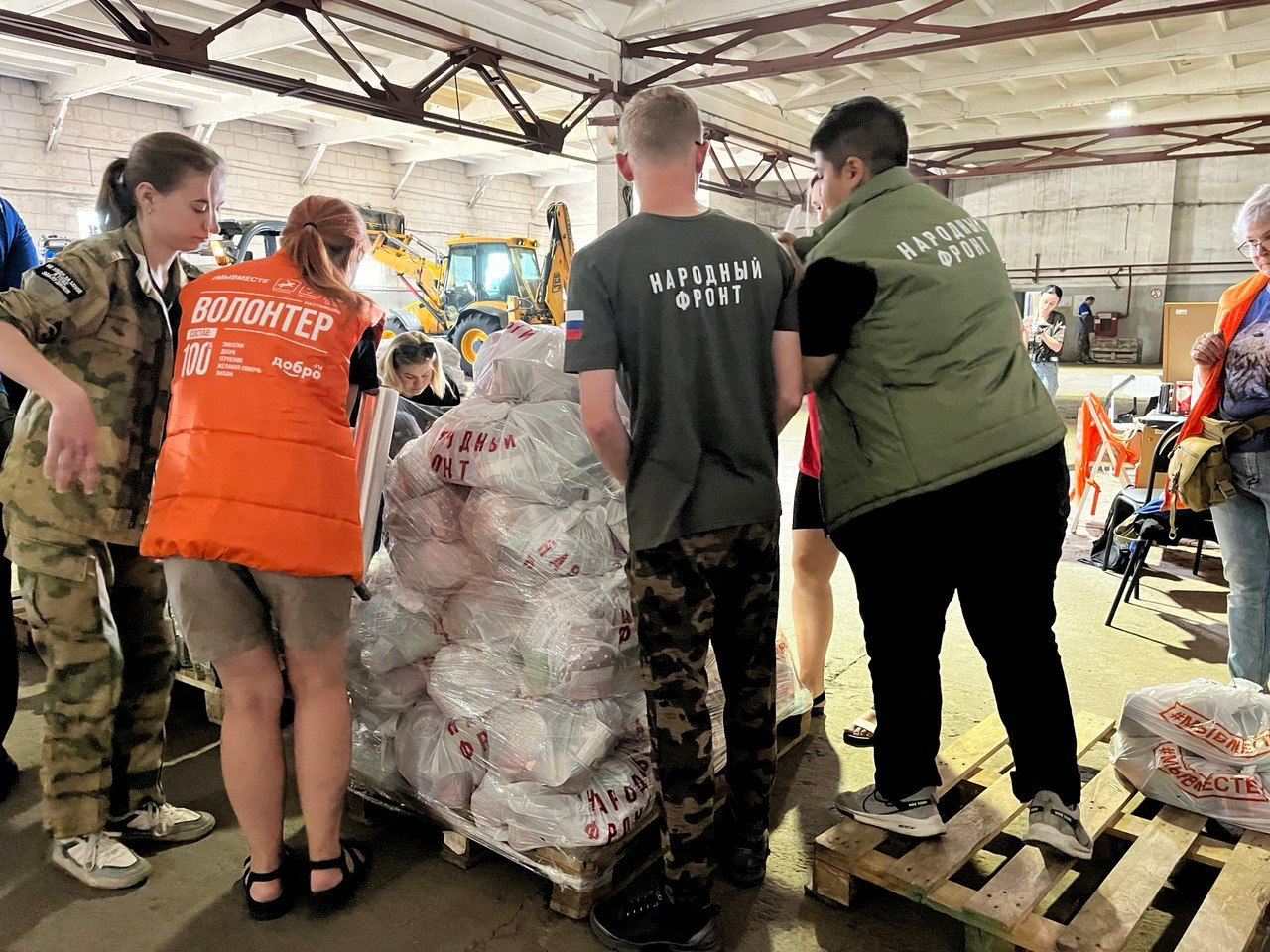
Distribution of humanitarian aid to residents of the Kursk Oblast, 9 August 2024

- 1 August –
  - 2024 American–Russian prisoner exchange: Twenty-six individuals are released in Ankara Esenboğa Airport in Turkey as part of a prisoner exchange between the United States and Russia.
  - Ten people are killed after an apartment block collapses due to a gas explosion in Nizhny Tagil.
- 2 August – Senator Dmitry Savelyev is arrested on suspicion of ordering the murder of a business associate in 2023.
- 4 August – A state of emergency is declared in Tuva due to wildfires.
- 5 August – Vyacheslav Akhmedov, head of the military-themed Patriot Park in Moscow and defence ministry official Major General Vladimir Shesterov are arrested on charges of embezzling the venue's funds.
- 6 August–ongoing – Russia claims that Ukrainian forces have made an incursion into Kursk Oblast, prompting a declaration of a state of emergency in the region on 7 August.
- 7 August – Ksenia Karelina pleads guilty in a Yekaterinburg court to a charge of treason.
- 8 August – YouTube is reportedly blocked and slowed down across Russia following the website's blocking of several channels that expressed support for the Russo-Ukrainian war. On the same day a former Wagner mercenary is sentenced to 16 years in prison for killing two of his comrades on 24 June 2023 during the Wagner Group rebellion.
- 14 August – A state of emergency is declared in Belgorod Oblast due to an extension of the Ukrainian incursion in neighboring Kursk Oblast.
- 15 August –
  - A Tu-22M3 bomber of the Russian Air Force crashes in Irkutsk Oblast, killing one crew member and injuring the other three crew.
  - The United Kingdom says that Ukraine can use British weaponry, including Challenger 2 tanks, for its military operations inside Russia.
- 16 August –
  - An “equipment failure” at the Primorskaya thermal power plant results in a major power outage that affects Khabarovsk and Primorsky Krais.
  - Russia accuses the United States and European nations of directly helping Ukraine in its incursion on Kursk Oblast by planning operations and providing military support, and states that their involvement "created all the prerequisites for Ukraine to lose its sovereignty and lose part of its territories".
- 17 August – 2024 Kamchatka Krai earthquake: A 7.2-magnitude earthquake strikes off the eastern coast of Kamchatka Krai with a tsunami warning being issued.
- 18 August – The Shiveluch volcano in Kamchatka Krai and Ebeko in the Kuril Islands erupt.
- 19 August – President Putin signs a decree making it easier for foreign nationals who support "traditional values" and "oppose neoliberalism" to seek asylum in Russia.
- 21 August – Mayor of Moscow Sergey Sobyanin states that Ukraine launched one of its largest drone attacks on the Russian capital, and claims that all drones were taken down without casualties or damage based on preliminary information.
- 23 August –
  - Surovikino penal colony hostage crisis: four Islamic State inmates at a prison in Surovikino, Volgograd Oblast seize control of the facility and take hostages, killing thirteen people including five prison employees before being killed by security forces.
  - A court in Armavir, Krasnodar Krai, sentences five men to up to nine years' imprisonment for participating in the 2023 antisemitic riots in the North Caucasus at Uytash Airport in Makhachkala, Dagestan.
- 24 August – Arrest and indictment of Pavel Durov: The owner and founder of the Telegram and VK social networks Pavel Durov is arrested at Paris–Le Bourget Airport in France shortly after arriving from Azerbaijan, in connection with alleged illegal activity on his Telegram app.
- 28 August –
  - Six suspected members of an "international terrorist organisation" are arrested by the FSB in Ingushetia on suspicion of plotting attacks.
  - A drone attack is reported in Kirov Oblast for the first time since the start of the war against Ukraine, causing a fire at an oil refiner in Kotelnich.
- 31 August – 2024 Kamchatka Mil Mi-8 crash: A tourist Mi-8T helicopter crashes near the Vachkazhets volcano in Kamchatka Krai, killing all 22 people on board. The wreckage is discovered on 1 September.

=== September ===
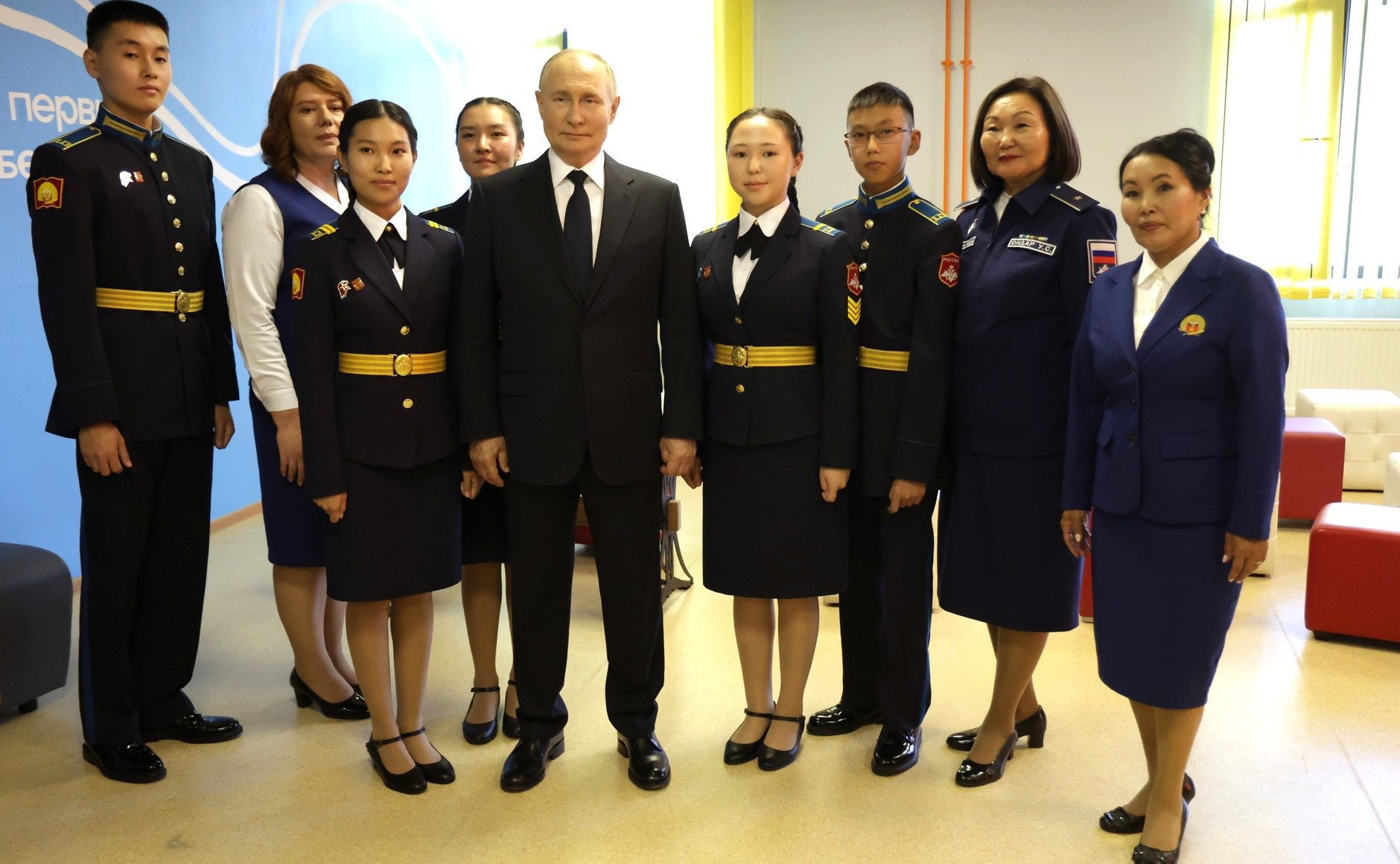
Vladimir Putin at the Kyzyl Presidential Cadet School in Kyzyl, Tuva, 2 September 2024

- 2 September –
  - Major General Valery Mumindzhanov, the deputy commander of the Leningrad Military District, is arrested on suspicion of accepting more than 20 million rubles in bribes for the supply of military uniforms when he was head of the Defense Ministry’s provisions department.
  - President Putin arrives in Mongolia to discuss a China–Russia gas pipeline meant to recoup Russian losses from Western sanctions, despite Ukraine's urges for Mongolia to arrest Putin under his International Criminal Court warrant.
- 8 September – 2024 Russian elections
- 9 September – An Aviatik Alliance Aleks-251 aircraft crashes during a test flight near Vatulino airfield in Ruza, Moscow Oblast, killing both pilots.
- 10 September – One person is killed in a Ukrainian drone strike in Ramenskoye, Moscow Oblast, which occurs during a massive drone attack involving 144 drones across nine regions of western Russia.
- 12 September – President Putin warns that Ukrainian use of NATO weapons to strike deep into Russian territory indicates NATO's formal entry into war against Russia, due to the programming of these weapons by NATO personnel representing a "direct confrontation".
- 13 September –
  - Russia revokes the accreditation of six British diplomats, accusing them of spying.
  - Reuters reports that Russia has begun production of thousands of Garpiya-A1 long-range combat drones used against Ukrainian civilian and military targets, that incorporate engines, parts, and technology from China.
- 14 September – Russia says that the approval of Ukrainian use of long-range weapons to strike inside Russia will result in an "uncontrolled escalation" with the West, and the "destruction" of Kyiv.
- 16 September –
  - Médecins Sans Frontières shuts down its operations in Russia after being deregistered by the Ministry of Justice.
  - Four people, including three children, are injured in a hammer attack inside a school in Chelyabinsk. The suspect, a 13-year old student, is arrested.
- 17 September – Meta Platforms announces a ban on Russian state media outlets including RT and Rossiya Segodnya, citing the use of deceptive tactics to carry out influence operations and evade detection.
- 18 September –
  - The FSB claims to have dismantled an Islamist-inspired "female terrorist cell" in Tatarstan.
  - Two people are killed in a shooting outside the offices of the online retailer Wildberries in Moscow during a dispute over the company's ownership.
- 23 September – The FSB arrests 15 people on suspicion of promoting radical Islamist ideology in Baksansky District, Kabardino-Balkaria.
- 25 September – President Putin revises Russia's nuclear weapons policy to allow their usage in response to an attack from a non-nuclear state supported by a nuclear-armed one.
- 27 September – Thirteen people are killed and 23 others are injured in the explosion of a gas station in Makhachkala, Dagestan.
- 30 September – Alexander Permyakov, a former pro-Russian separatist fighter from eastern Ukraine, is convicted and sentenced to life imprisonment for his role in the attempted assassination of nationalist writer Zakhar Prilepin in Nizhny Novgorod Oblast in 2023.

=== October ===
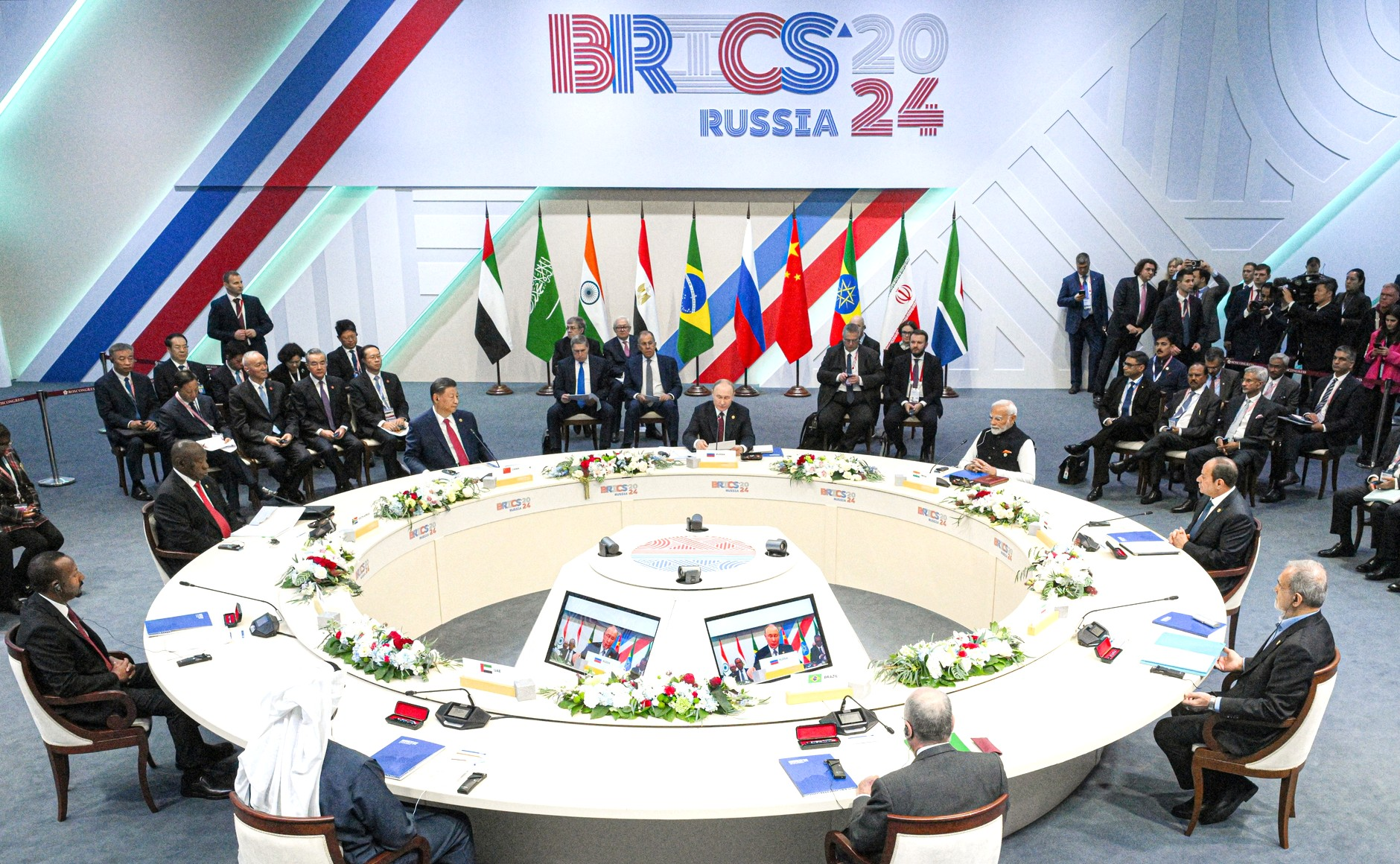
16th BRICS summit in Kazan, 23 October 2024

- 12 October – Four people are killed in an explosion at a gas station in Grozny, Chechnya.
- 14 October – A court in Moscow sentences French researcher Laurent Vinatier to three years' imprisonment for breaking the foreign agents law.
- 15 October – Three people are injured in a car bombing in Moscow.
- 18 October – The cargo ship Grigory Lotsov capsizes off the coast of Korsakovsky District, Sakhalin Oblast, leaving two crew members dead and two others missing. Three remaining crew are rescued.
- 22–24 October – The 16th BRICS summit is held in Kazan.
- 22 October – A ban on the wearing of hijabs and other religious clothing in schools is introduced in Vladimir Oblast.
- 24 October –
  - Deputy energy minister Sergei Mochalnikov and his predecessor Anatoly Yanovsky are arrested on suspicion of fraud and corruption in the coal industry.
  - Riots against members of the Romani community in Korkino, Chelyabinsk Oblast following the murder of a woman, leading to at least 40 arrests.
- 25 October –
  - The Central Bank of Russia raises interest rates to 21%, the highest since 2003, citing inflation and the economic effects of the Russo-Ukrainian war.
  - Four people are injured in a knife attack at a supermarket in Saint Petersburg. The suspect is arrested.
- 26 October –
  - Six inmates escape from a prison in Lipetsk Oblast.
  - A Mil Mi-2 ambulance helicopter crashes into a forest near Beleenki, Kirov Oblast, killing all four people on board.
- 29 October – A drone attack is reported for the first time in Chechnya since the start of Russo-Ukrainian war, causing a fire at the Russian Special Forces University in Gudermes.
- 31 October –
  - A court issues a "symbolic" fine to Google of 2 undecillion rubles (equivalent to about $20 decillion USD, and more money than there is in the entire world), for blocking state media on YouTube.
  - The Constitutional Court lifts the statute of limitations in corruption cases involving the state seizure of assets but stops short of applying the conditions to cases of “unlawful privatization” during the 1990s.
  - Five people are killed in a gas explosion at an apartment building in Cherkessk, Karachay-Cherkessia.

=== November ===
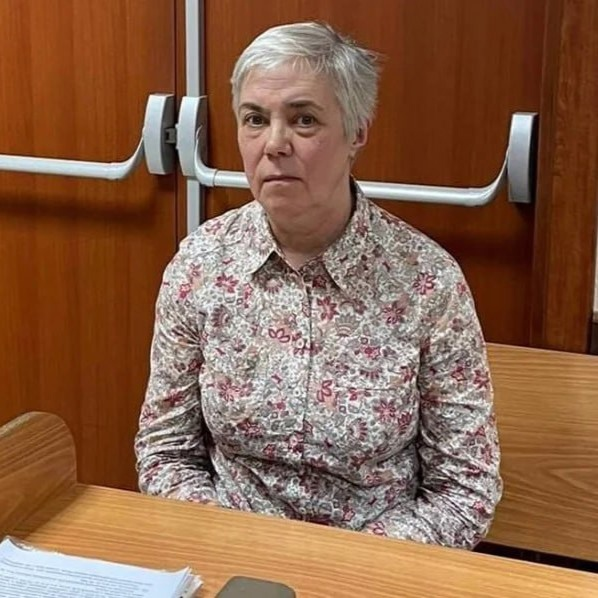
Pediatrician Nadezhda Buyanova was sentenced to 5.5 years in prison for allegedly making pro-Ukrainian comments.

- 1 November – A court in Vladivostok convicts former US consulate employee Robert Shonov of cooperating with a foreign state and sentences him to more than four years' imprisonment.
- 4 November –
  - Maksim Yegorov and Vasily Golubev resign from their positions as the respective governors of Tambov and Rostov Oblasts. They are replaced by Yevgeny Pervyshov and Yury Slyusar respectively.
  - Ukraine announces its first combat engagements with North Korean soldiers in Kursk Oblast.
- 5 November – Vladimir Uyba resigns as head of the Komi Republic and is replaced by Rostislav Goldstein.
- 6 November –
  - A Ukrainian drone attack is recorded in Dagestan for the first time, with strikes reported on the garrison of the Russian Navy's Caspian Flotilla in Kaspiysk. One person is injured.
  - The Federation Council ratifies the Comprehensive Strategic Partnership treaty providing strengthened military cooperation with North Korea.
- 12 November – Ukrainian-born Russian pediatrician Nadezhda Buyanova was sentenced to 5.5 years in prison after her patient's mother reported her to the police for allegedly making pro-Ukrainian comments.
- 12 November – The State Duma votes unanimously to ban 'Childfree Propaganda’ to boost birthrates in Russia.
- 14 November – The Gulag History Museum in Moscow is ordered closed due to "fire safety" violations amid a crackdown on dissent by authorities.
- 23 November – Putin signs into law a bill banning "childfree propaganda" and the adoption of Russian children to countries allowing gender transitioning.
- 26 November – A British diplomat is expelled from Russia on suspicion of espionage.
- 27 November – Russia expels two journalists of the German broadcaster ARD in retaliation for the expulsion of two journalists working for Channel One Russia in Germany and the reported shutdown of its bureau in Berlin.

=== December ===
- 5 December – Alexei Smirnov resigns as governor of Kursk Oblast and is replaced by federal deputy Alexander Khinshtein.
- 8 December – Russian intervention in the Syrian civil war: Russia effectively ends its intervention in the Syrian civil war as President Bashar al-Assad's government collapses. Assad and his family flee to Moscow as rebel forces enter Damascus.
- 15 December – An oil tanker sinks while another is damaged during a storm in the Kerch Strait, leaving one person dead and triggering an oil spill.
- 16 December – Ilya Repin's 1880s painting Ivan the Terrible and His Son Ivan is put on public display in the Tretyakov Gallery in Moscow following extensive restoration works to repair knife damage caused by a vandal in 2018.
- 17 December – Lieutenant-General Igor Kirillov, the commander of the Russian NBC Protection Troops, is killed along with an assistant in a scooter bombing in Moscow.
- 18 December – A passenger train collides with a freight train in Murmansk, killing two people and injuring 31 others.
- 23 December – The Russian cargo ship Ursa Major sinks following an engine room explosion in the Mediterranean Sea between Spain and Algeria, leaving two sailors missing. Fourteen others are taken to Cartagena by Spanish rescuers. The ship's owners subsequently blame the sinking on a "terrorist attack".
- 25 December –
  - Azerbaijan Airlines Flight 8243, an Embraer ERJ-190AR carrying 67 people, crashes in Aktau, Kazakhstan, killing 38 people on board. Azerbaijan subsequently accuses Russia of unintentionally shooting down the aircraft as it approached its destination of Grozny, Chechnya during a suspected Ukrainian drone attack.
  - A state of emergency is declared in Krasnodar Krai due to the 2024 Kerch Strait oil spill. The next day, President Putin raises the state of emergency to the federal level.
- 27 December – The South Korean National Intelligence Service says that a North Korean soldier has been taken prisoner by Ukrainian forces for the first time during the 2024 Kursk offensive. However, the soldier is reported to have died later in the day from injuries sustained in combat.

== Holidays ==
- 1-2 January – New Year's Day
- 7 January – Orthodox Christmas
- 23 February – Defender of the Fatherland Day
- 8 March – International Women's Day
- 1 May – Labour Day
- 9 May – Victory Day
- 12 June – Russia Day
- 4 November – National Unity Day

== Deaths ==
- 3 January –
  - Pyotr Chernyayev, 70, film critic, actor (Election Day), and journalist.
  - Vladimir Ageyev, 91, painter.
- 4 January –
  - Leonid Tkachenko, 70, Ukrainian-Russian football player (Baltika Kaliningrad, Metalist Kharkiv) and manager (Dynamo Saint Petersburg).
  - Konstantin Zheldin, 90, actor (Major Whirlwind, Seventeen Moments of Spring, Brother 2).
- 6 January –
  - Victor Ekimovskiy, 76, composer.
  - Oleg Ryabokon, 84, film director, screenwriter, and songwriter.
  - Vladimir Khavinson, 77, gerontologist, member of the Russian Academy of Sciences.
- 8 January –
  - Mark Kharitonov, 86, novelist, poet and translator.
  - Djabrail Chahkiev, 68, archaeologist.
- 10 January –
  - Marat Baglai, 92, jurist, judge (1995–2003) and president (1997–2003) of the Constitutional Court.
  - Tamara Milashkina, 89, operatic soprano.
- 11 January – Yury Solomin, 88, actor (An Ordinary Miracle, Dersu Uzala, Die Fledermaus).
- 12 January – Gennady Yakovlev, 85, botanist, pharmacognosist, and phytochemist.
- 14 January – Lev Rubinstein, 76, poet, essayist, and social activist.
- 15 January – Tatyana Frunze, 103, organic chemist and professor.
- 22 January – Sergei Yefremenko, 51, singer, guitarist, and lyricist (Markscheider Kunst).
- 29 January – Yuri Ilchenko, 72, vocalist and guitarist (Mify, Zemlyane).
- 31 January – Farida Muminova, 66, actress (Toʻylar muborak, Such Late, Such Warm Autumn, The Battle of the Three Kings).
- 1 February – Pavel Kapinos, 48, cinematographer (Hardcore Henry, Yolki 5, Kitchen. The Last Battle).
- 3 February – Aleksey Poteleshchenko, 47, Ukrainian-Russian military officer and politician.
- 4 February – Galina Alekseyeva, 76, diver, Olympic bronze medallist (1964).
- 5 February – Vyacheslav Sokolov, 82, politician, MP (1996–2000).
- 8 February – Yuri Borzov, 70, graphic artist, architect and drummer (Mashina Vremeni).
- 9 February – Ivan Sergeyev, 82, diplomat.
- 12 February – Aleksandr Seleznyov, 60, hammer thrower.
- 13 February –
  - Valery Vostrotin, 71, colonel general and politician, deputy (2003–2011).
  - Rashit Safiullin, 74, artist, production designer and decorator (Stalker).
- 14 February –
  - Tamara Kolesnikova, 85, actress (Day of Sun and Rain, Sofia Kovalevskaya, Raspoutine).
  - Anatoly Vershik, 90, mathematician (Bratteli-Vershik diagram).
- 16 February –
  - Alexei Navalny, 47, lawyer, politician, and activist.
  - Dmitry Markov, 41, documentary photographer and journalist.
- 23 February – Vyacheslav Lebedev, 80, 1st Chief Justice of the Russian Federation.
- 28 February – Nikolai Ryzhkov, 94, 10th Premier of the Soviet Union.
- 29 May – Inna Solovyova, 96, theatre and film critic and scholar

== See also ==
- Timeline of the Russian invasion of Ukraine (1 December 2023 – present)
