= Ivan Sergeyev =

Ivan Sergeyev may refer to:

- Ivan Sergeyev (tennis)
- Ivan Sergeyev (footballer)
- Ivan Sergeyev (diplomat)
