= U.S.–Russia Joint Commission on POW/MIAs =

Commission to investigate the aftermath of military conflicts

The U.S.–Russia Joint Commission on POWs/MIAs (USRJC) was established in 1992 by the presidents of the United States and the Russian Federation, George H. W. Bush and Boris Yeltsin. The USRJC was established to determine the fates of the United States's and the Soviet Union's unaccounted-for service personnel from World War II, the Korean War, the Cold War (as defined by the USRJC's directive to be specific "reconnaissance missions"), Afghanistan and the Vietnam War, Laos and Cambodia.

Information exchanged between the two parties is then investigated by a spectrum of governmental entities. In the U.S., the Defense POW/MIA Accounting Agency (DPAA) is the lead agency responsible for personnel accounting.

The commission, holds a formal plenary to discuss a spectrum of issues that involve Prisoners of War and Missing in Action such as; archival research, reported gravesites, loss incident reports, shoot-downs, archival reports, Soviet Bloc nation intelligence and reports, information passed on to the commission and to establish the direction the USRJC and its Working Groups.

Commission Members and researchers interview former military personnel, civilians, former Internees, contract for archival access, research, search military museums and expand the investigative program in an effort to account for missing service members.

Joint Commission Support Division (JCSD), Defense POW/MIA Accounting Agency (DPAA) provides administrative and analytic support to the U.S. Side of the U.S.–Russia Joint Commission on POW/MIAs (USRJC) and conducts research in Russia on missing U.S. service personnel. JCSD also assists the Government of Russia with efforts to account for its missing.

U.S. analysts have had access to many important Russian governmental archives for research on past conflicts including the Central Archives of the Ministry of Defense in Podolsk, Russia—the largest military archive in Europe. After a period of decreased cooperation starting in 2006, U.S. President Obama and Russian President Medvedev revitalized the work of the USRJC in July 2009 with an exchange of Diplomatic Notes reaffirming their respective countries' commitment to strengthening bilateral cooperation on POW/MIA issues.

Retired Air Force General Robert H. "Doc" Foglesong has served as Chairman of the U.S. Side since April 2006. The most recent Russian Presidential Decree on the USRJC, issued in July 2014, appointed General-Colonel (retired) Valeriy A. Vostrotin as the Chairman of the commission's Russian Side and fills other vacant Russian commissioner seats.

The USRJC is broken down into four Working Groups which correlate to the four main areas of investigation. There is the World War II Working Group, the Korean War Working Group, the Cold War Working Group and finally, the Vietnam War Working Group, which deals with aspects of the Vietnam War POW/MIA issue.

== History ==
=== Efforts Relating to World War II ===
JCSD analysts conduct research of Soviet military and captured German documents in Russian archives searching for information on specific American WWII losses that occurred in areas controlled or eventually captured by Soviet forces.

=== Efforts Relating to the Korean War ===
Russian archives detail combat activities of Soviet air and anti-aircraft artillery units deployed to defend military targets in the northwest area of North Korea. Thus far, Russian archival data has provided information that clarified the circumstances of loss for 336 cases involving missing U.S. servicemen from the Korean War. Researchers interviewed more than 1,000 Soviet veterans of the Korean War since the USRJC began its work in the former USSR.

=== Efforts Relating to the Cold War ===
JCSD analysts investigate the air losses of U.S. servicemen missing during the Cold War between 1950 and 1965 that occurred along the periphery of the former Soviet Union. Since 1992, U.S. analysts assigned to JCSD have worked with Soviet-era veterans, Russian government officials, and archival researchers to gather data on the 126 U.S. service members who are still unaccounted for as a result of fourteen separate Cold War incidents. JCSD analysts continue to assist the Russians in accounting for Soviet soldiers missing from the 1979-1989 war in Afghanistan and other Cold War-era incidents.

On July 6, 2009, the U.S. Government and the Government of the Russian Federation exchanged diplomatic notes reflecting their common understandings regarding the establishment of bilateral cooperation in the sphere of determining the fates of Soviet/Russian and U.S. service-members missing in action (MIA) during the Second World War and wars and armed conflicts thereafter, and expressing their mutual commitment to the humanitarian goal of determining the fates of Soviet/Russian and U.S. service members who are MIA as a result of wars and armed conflicts. Over the past 20 years, the USRJC advised the U.S. and Russian governments regarding the fates of U.S. and Soviet/Russian servicemen and civilians in the employment of their governments who are unaccounted for from World War II through Cold War military conflicts, during Soviet military operations in Afghanistan (1979–1989), and in other small-scale hostile encounters between opposing forces. This Charter reflects a consensus among relevant departments and agencies on how the USRJC will operate to realize most effectively the humanitarian goals expressed in that exchange of diplomatic notes and maximize the accounting for U.S. service members still listed as MIA.

=== Efforts related to the Vietnam War ===
Since 1992, researchers interviewed more than 750 Soviet veterans of the Vietnam War. JCSD cultivates contacts with Russian veterans’ groups to identify possible interview subjects. JCSD continues to pursue declassification of Russia's Vietnam War information that may help clarify the fate of missing U.S. service personnel from that conflict.

== Charter for the U.S. side of the commission ==
1. Commission's Official Designation: U.S. Side of the U.S.–Russia Joint Commission on POW/MIAs (USRJC or the commission), will hereinafter be referenced as the “U.S. Side.” The USRJC refers to the entire Russian and U.S. Commission.
2. Purpose and Authority: The Presidents of the United States and the Russian Federation inaugurated the USRJC on March 26, 1992, to establish a bilateral mechanism for investigating matters concerning the presence of U.S. POW/MIAs on the territory of the former Soviet Union.
3. Description of Duties: The U.S. Side is to focus on: (a) supporting effective interaction with Russian officials and assist both countries to account for the missing personnel described in paragraph 2 above; (b) engaging in plenary sessions with Russian counterparts as needed to further the objectives of the USRJC; (c) recommending priorities for the conflict-specific and other USRJC working groups described in paragraph 6 below, and (d) advising appropriate U.S. Government officials on matters arising from the USRJC.
4. Reporting Relationships and Annual Reporting Requirements: The U.S. Side is to submit an annual report in writing to the President via the Deputy National Security Advisor not later than 30 days after the end of each calendar year. The annual report is to include: progress towards achieving long-term strategic goals; the preceding year's efforts and progress; methodologies used to establish and measure progress; detailed plans to overcome obstacles impeding progress; in-depth analysis of new information; including how it differs from information already known by the U.S. Government; an evaluation of the effectiveness of the U.S. Side's interaction with Russian counterparts during the previous year, an estimate of when the commission's mission will be complete; including the measures by which such estimates will be calculated; and the overall efforts of the USRJC. The POW-MIA Interagency Policy Committee is to monitor the work of the U.S. Side and make recommendations to the President using the interagency process described in Presidential Policy Directive 1.
5. Membership: The U.S. Side is to be composed of ten members from the executive and legislative branches.
  1. The U.S. Chairman is to be designated by the President of the United States. The U.S. Chairman is to oversee the activities of the U.S. Side as described in this Charter.
  2. The Majority Leader and Minority Leader of the Senate, in consultation with the U.S. Chairman, each is to designate one currently serving Senator.
  3. The Speaker and the Minority Leader of the House of Representatives, in consultation with the U.S. Chairman, each is to designate one current member of the House.
  4. The Secretary of State and the Archivist of the United States each, in consultation with the U.S. Chairman, is to designate one Commissioner, respectively. Each designee must be a full-time or permanent part-time Federal employee.
  5. The Secretary of Defense is to designate the DoD Commissioner and a Commissioner representing the Director, Defense Intelligence Agency. The DoD Commissioner, in consultation with the U.S. Chairman, is to designate a DoD employee as the Executive Secretary to the U.S. Side. The Executive Secretary is a non-voting member. If required, the DoD Commissioner is to serve as the Designated Federal Officer—a full-time or permanent part-time Senior Executive Service or equivalent DoD employee, appointed in accordance with DoD policies and procedures. Travel and per diem expenses for official U.S. Side and USRJC travel are to be borne by the Commissioner's parent organization. DoD is to provide travel and per diem expenses for the U.S. Chairman. Commissioners are to serve a term of two years and, with the approval of the respective designating authority, may serve additional terms. All Commissioners are appointed to provide expert advice on behalf of the U.S. Government on the basis of their best judgment, without representing any particular point of view, and in a manner that is free from conflict of interest.
6. Working Groups: The U.S. Side is to be organized into four working groups complementing the organization of the Russian Side of the USRJC. Each working group is to be from a specific conflict and is to be chaired by a U.S. Commissioner designated by the U.S. Chairman of the USRJC. As stated in paragraph 8 below, each Working Group is to plan to meet with its Russian counterpart not less than once yearly. The four working groups include World War II; the Korean War; the Vietnam War; and the Cold War. Additionally, the Cold War Working Group is to address local conflicts, Soviet military operations in Afghanistan (1979–1989), and contemporary conflicts. All U.S. working group members must be full-time, permanent part-time Federal employees, or members of the armed forces.
7. Support: The Department of Defense is to provide support as deemed necessary for the performance of the U.S. Side's functions (including travel, information technology, and logistics support for meetings in the United States, Russia, the territory of the former Soviet Union, and other locations as necessary), and is to assist in ensuring compliance with applicable law and regulations.
8. Estimated Number and Frequency of Meetings: The U.S. Side is to meet not less than once per year and prior to each plenary with the Russian Side, as determined by the U. S. Chairman. As needed, working group meetings and consultations may be held in addition to and in parallel with plenary sessions.
9. Recordkeeping: The records of the U.S. Side are to be handled according to Section 2 of General Record Schedule 26, National Archives and Records Administration General Records Schedules, and appropriate U.S. Government policies and procedures. These records are to be available for public inspection and copying, subject to the Freedom of Information Act of 1966 (5 U.S.C. § 552) and other applicable law and regulations.
10. Termination: The U.S. Side shall terminate upon completion of its mission or when directed by the President of the United States.
