= Andrey Kurshin =

Russian dissident milblogger

- Андрей Куршин
- Born: 12 June 1988 (age 38)
- Other name: Moskva
- Occupations: Milblogger; software engineer
- Years active: 2015–2023
- Known for: Moscow Calling

Andrey Vladimirovich Kurshin (Russian: Андрей Владимирович Куршин; born 12 June 1988) is a Russian former milblogger who ran the Moscow Calling channel on Telegram. Kurshin gained notoriety for being arrested by Russian authorities for discrediting the Russian Armed Forces during the Russian invasion of Ukraine.

== Biography ==
Kurshin was born on 12 June 1988. He fought for the self-proclaimed Donetsk People's Republic from 2014 to 2015 under the call sign Moskva during the war in Donbas. Upon returning to Russia, Kurshin started the Moscow Calling channel to cover the Russo-Ukrainian War and notably adopting a more moderate position on the war. While running Moscow Calling, Kurshin also worked as a software engineer for the firm Rif, which develops weapons-related software, and claims to have contacts in high places within the Russian military.

=== Moscow Calling ===
Moscow Calling was run by Kurshin anonymously and frequently espoused ultranationalist views and become one of the leading milbloggers criticising the supposed inadequacy and ineptitude of the Russian Ministry of Defence's planning, fighting, and leadership during the Russian invasion of Ukraine. Kurshin would be doxxed by his fellow milbloggers as the administrator of Moscow Calling after joking about the assassination of Vladlen Tatarsky in April 2023. Kurshin frequently posted in favour of fellow dissident ultranationalist Igor Girkin. In May 2023, he claimed that pro-war activists threw a brick through the window of his mother's house. At the time of his arrest Moscow Calling had 87,000 followers.

=== Arrest and sentence ===
On 31 August 2023, shortly after Moscow Calling made a post of a video of members of the 205th Separate Motor Rifle Brigade complaining about poor uniforms and shoddy equipment, Kurshin would be arrested at a train station. The Russian state news agency TASS reported that Kurshin was arrested for violating Article 207.3 of the Criminal Code of Russia for the "dissemination of deliberately false information about the Russian Armed Forces".

Several of Moscow Calling's post where used as evidence in court, namely, posts between 14 September and 23 November 2022, covering Russian shelling of Zaporizhzhia Oblast and a strike near a dam on the river Inhulets near Kherson. Facing ten years in prison, Kurshin plead guilty to the charges on 1 September in a hope to get a reduced sentence. On 7 August 2024, Kurshin was sentenced to 6 and a half years in prison.
