= Rostov-on-Don pre-trial detention center hostage crisis =

Hostage crisis in Rostov-on-Don, Russia

Rostov on Don pre-trial detention center hostage crisis
- Part of Islamic State insurgency in the North Caucasus, terrorism in Russia and Islamic terrorism in Europe
- Location of Rostov Oblast in Russia
Date	16 June 2024
Location	Rostov-on-Don, Russia
Result	Russian victory All militants killed or captured, hostages released

Belligerents
Islamic State	Russia

Casualties and losses
5 killed, 1 captured	1-2 injured

On 16 June 2024, a hostage situation occurred at a detention center in Rostov-on-Don, Rostov Oblast, Russia. The hostage takers, all Islamic State militants who were previously detained at the center, were shot and killed except one militant captured alive, two employees were rescued.

Six men, armed with knives, took two prison guards hostage. The hostage-takers demanded a vehicle, weapons and safe passage out of the center. Russian special forces stormed the facility and killed five of the militants, and wounded and captured the sixth. The prison guards were freed with minor injuries.

== See also ==
- Surovikino penal colony hostage crisis
- Islamic State insurgency in the North Caucasus
- Insurgency in the North Caucasus
- War against the Islamic State
- Terrorism in Russia
- Crocus City Hall attack
- Islamic terrorism in Europe
