= Aleksey Poteleshchenko =

Ukrainian-Russian military officer and politician (1976–2024)

- Олексій Потелещенко

Minister of Emergency Situations of the Luhansk People's Republic
- In office September 2023 – 3 February 2024

Personal details
- Born: Aleksey Aleksandrovich Poteleshchenko; 3 December 1976 Odesa, Ukrainian SSR, USSR
- Died: 3 February 2024 (aged 47) Lysychansk, Ukraine
- Education: Kharkiv Military University
- Occupation: Military officer

Aleksey Aleksandrovich Poteleshchenko (Russian: Алексей Александрович Потелещенко; Ukrainian: Олексій Олександрович Потелещенко, romanized: Oleksii Oleksandrovych Poteleshchenko; 3 December 1976 – 3 February 2024) was a Ukrainian Russian collaborationist military officer and politician. He served as Minister of Emergency Situations of the Luhansk People's Republic from 2023 to 2024.

Poteleshchenko died in Lysychansk during a Ukrainian shelling, at the age of 47.
