= Darya Trepova =

Russian political activist and terrorist

- Дарья Трепова
- Born: 16 February 1997 (age 29); St. Petersburg, Russia
- Education: Saint Petersburg State University
- Occupations: Fashion designer Political activist
- Spouse: Dmitri Rilov

Darya Yevgenyevna Trepova (Note: First name alternatively romanised as Daria) (Russian: Дарья Евгеньевна Трепова; born 16 February 1997) is a Russian political activist and convicted terrorist from St. Petersburg.

== Biography ==
=== Early life ===
Darya Yevgenyevna Trepova was born on 16 February 1997 in St. Petersburg. She graduated for her secondary education at Lyceum No. 408 in Pushkin, Saint Petersburg. Her father died when she was finishing at the Lyceum.

=== Career ===
After graduating, Trepova joined the medical faculty of Saint Petersburg State University. Trepova combined her studies at the university with a part-time job in dentistry, and as a freelance designer and working as an administrator in a vintage clothing store. Trepova became a feminist and vegan and attended Russian opposition events. In 2019, Trepova dropped out of university.

=== Activism (2022–present) ===
During the Russian invasion of Ukraine, Trepova participated in anti-war protests, and was arrested on 24 February 2022 for disobeying police orders to disperse. She was detained for ten days. Later she moved to Moscow, where she rented an apartment near the Medvedkovo metro station, and then to Georgia, where she lived for six months. Due to financial difficulties, Trepova was forced to return to Russia. The media paid attention to her October 2022 Twitter posts stating she "thinks about suicide from 20 to 150 times a day" "without a note of self-pity". The following month, Trepova deleted her Twitter account.

She had quit her job at the clothing store and moved to Moscow around a month prior to the explosion.

On 9 March 2023, Trepova registered as a sole proprietor.

== Assassination of Vladlen Tatarsky ==
On 2 April 2023, the café Street Food Bar No. 1, formerly owned by Wagner Group leader Yevgeny Prigozhin, was hosting a meeting with the military blogger Vladlen Tatarsky. About 85 people were in attendance. At 6:13 pm (MSK), an improvised explosive device went off, killing Tatarsky and injuring 52. A young woman, later identified as Trepova, introduced herself to Tatarsky as an artist named Nastya (Anastasiya) and gifted him a figurine of himself, which he set aside. She had allegedly joked around with Tatarsky about the possibility of the bust containing a bomb, but this has not been substantiated by video footage taken immediately before the explosion. According to witnesses, Trepova sat down three metres away from him, and the explosion happened about five minutes later.

On 3 April, Trepova was put on the Russia's most wanted list. She fled to the apartment of her husband's friend Dmitry Kasintsev, where she was arrested the next day. On 4 April, she was transported to Moscow and taken to the Basmanny District Court, where a judge ruled that Trepova was to be kept at a pre-trial detention center for two months. She was charged by the Investigative Committee with committing "a terrorist act by an organised group that caused intentional death", which carries a maximum sentence of 20 years in prison. Additionally, the Investigative Committee accused Trepova being an "[agent] cooperating with the so-called Anti-Corruption Foundation of Alexey Navalny". However, Ivan Zhdanov, director of the Anti-Corruption Foundation, denied any involvement of the foundation in the explosion.

In a video of an interrogation released by the Ministry of Internal Affairs, Trepova admitted that she gave the figurine to Tatarsky, but did not say that she knew that there would be an explosion or that she had any further role in his death. After she was asked if she knows the reason behind her arrest, she said, "I would say for being at the scene of Vladlen Tatarsky’s murder... I brought the statuette there which blew up." Trepova refused to name the person from whom she obtained the figurine. The Independent noted that it was "unclear" whether she was under duress.

Her friend testified that Trepova had sent her the following message on Telegram after the explosion: "I was there, and it would have been better if I had died there. I was framed, I don't know what to do."

On 25 January 2024, Trepova was convicted by a military court in Saint Petersburg of terrorism, handling explosives and using forged documents and sentenced to 27 years in prison, one of the harshest sentences ever given to a woman in Russia. She pleaded guilty only to the charge of document forgery. She said that she was following orders from a contact in Ukraine named "Gestalt", who assured her that the statuette contained only a wiretap and a tracker, but not a bomb. Trepova said she had assumed that the reason for eavesdropping on Tatarsky was to find out more of what he knew about the war, which she opposed. Her legal team said that they would appeal the verdict.

In March 2024, the head of the Security Service of Ukraine (SBU), Vasyl Malyuk, claimed that an operative of his agency had tricked Trepova into assassinating Tatarsky, but said that the SBU would not take responsibility for Tatarsky's death.

In August 2025, Mediazona reported that Trepova was transferred to strict imprisonment regime (SUS) (Note: The imposition of the strict imprisonment regime (Russian: строгие условия содержания) is decided by a commission of penal colony employees with no judicial involvement. Prisoners under SUS are isolated in separate cells, and are not allowed to freely move around the colony.) for unknown reasons. The prior month, she was given two 13-day placements in a punishment cell.

=== Aftermath ===
Maria Zakharova, the spokesperson of the Ministry of Foreign Affairs, criticised Western countries for their failure to condemn the terrorist attack, and accused them of treating Trepova as the victim instead of Tatarsky.

Sergei Davidis of Memorial stated that they will not recognise Trepova as a political prisoner, as people who have committed violent crimes are not political prisoners. He acknowledged that there may have been political motives in her prosecution, and promised that they would revisit her case if any evidence emerged that showed that she was tricked and did not intend to kill Tatarsky.

According to The Guardian, Victor Pelevin's novel Cool features a "perverse caricature" of Trepova as Darya Troedyrkina ('Three-holes'), a "castrating feminist tasked with assassinating a male dictator".
