= Surovikino penal colony hostage crisis =

2024 mass stabbing attack in Volgograd Oblast, Southern Russia

- Part of Islamic State insurgency in the North Caucasus
- Volgograd oblast in Russia
- Date: 23 August 2024
- Time: c. 12:30 – 16:58 (MSK)
- Location: IK-19 Surovikino penal colony, Surovikino, Volgograd Oblast, Russia; 48°36′31″N 42°52′35″E
- Type: Mass stabbing, hostage-taking
- Motive: Revenge for the detention of the suspects in the Crocus City Hall attack
- Deaths: 13 (including four attackers)
- Injuries: 2

On 23 August 2024, four prison inmates attacked the guards of the IK-19 Surovikino penal colony in Surovikino, in Volgograd Oblast of southern Russia and took hostages. Unconfirmed reports said the attackers were linked to the Islamic State. The attackers claimed they were taking revenge for the detained suspects in the Crocus City Hall attack in March 2024.

== Attack ==
At 16:00, the assault on the colony began during a meeting of the colony’s disciplinary committee. The attackers took 12 hostages, including eight prison staff members and four inmates. Three prison employees were killed, while four other people were injured. At 16:58, the assault ended, with all hostages being rescued. The attackers were killed by snipers from the National Guard of Russia. In the aftermath of the attack, two prison employees died of their injuries in the hospital, one after the attack on August 23, and another on August 26.

== Perpetrators ==
The four attackers were from Tajikistan and Uzbekistan. Three were convicted for drug trafficking, the other for killing a person during a brawl.

The men released videos amid the hostage-taking, pledging allegiance to the Islamic State, and announcing that they were avenging the IS perpetrators of the Crocus City Hall attack.

On August 29th, the Islamic State claimed responsibility for the attack in its weekly "Al-Naba" newsletter, as well as the Rostov-on-Don pre-trial detention center hostage crisis which took place two months prior in June, with otherwise 0 casualties, praising the attackers and noting the similarity of both revolts.

== Management negligence ==
After a similar incident in Rostov, the heads of local prisons stated that they were always ready for such cases, and that new precautions should not be introduced. State Duma deputy Alexander Khinshtein complained about corruption in the penal colony, during which workers sold knives and phones to militants, despite the increased threat.

== See also ==
- Islamic terrorism in Europe
- Rostov-on-Don pre-trial detention center hostage crisis
- Terrorism in Russia
