= Seletkan =

Seletkan Селеткан
- Selo
- Location within Amur Oblast Location within Russia
- Coordinates: 51°55′N 127°54′E
- Country: Russia
- Region: Amur Oblast
- District: Shimanovsky District
- Time zone: UTC+9:00

Seletkan (Russian: Селеткан) is a rural locality (a selo) and the administrative center of Seletkansky Selsoviet of Shimanovsky District, Amur Oblast, Russia. The population was 278 as of 2018. There are 9 streets.

== Geography ==
Seletkan is located on the Bolshaya Pyora River, 30 km southeast of Shimanovsk (the district's administrative centre) by road. Malinovka is the nearest rural locality.
