= Radik Tagirov =

Russian serial killer (born 1982)

- Радик Тагиров
- Born: May 1982 (age 44); Kazan, Tatar Autonomous Soviet Socialist Republic, Soviet Union
- Other name: "The Volga Maniac"
- Motive: Robbery
- Convictions: Murder x31 Attempted murder x3 Assault x34
- Penalty: Life imprisonment

Details
- Victims: 31
- Span of crimes: 2011–2012
- Country: Russia
- States: Tatarstan, Ulyanovsk, Nizhny Novgorod, Udmurtia, Perm, Samara, Bashkortostan
- Date apprehended: 1 December 2020

Radik Tagirovich Tagirov (Russian: Радик Тагирович Тагиров, Tatar: Радик Таһир улы Таһиров; born May 1982), dubbed the Volga Maniac, is a Russian serial killer who murdered 31 elderly women in and around the republic of Tatarstan between 2011 and 2012. In March 2024, he was sentenced to life in prison.

== Early life ==
Radik Tagirov was born in the Tatar Autonomous Soviet Socialist Republic, which later became the Russian republic known as Tatarstan after the collapse of the Soviet Union. After reaching adulthood, Tagirov pursued a locksmithing career in Tatarstan's capital city of Kazan. In 2009, after being convicted on petty theft charges, he spent the next four years as a vagrant who wandered from place to place looking for means to survive on the street.

== Murders ==
From March 2011 to September 2012, a series of similar murders of elderly women occurred in the Volga and Ural federal districts. All victims were single women aged 75 to 90 years old, each living in a khrushchevka. According to investigators, Tagirov entered the apartments while pretending to be an employee of a utility company or the social service. All victims were strangled with improvised items (for example, a bathroom robe belt) or his own hands. After the murders, Tagirov would steal money and valuables from the apartment.

The first nine murders took place in Kazan. One of the victims survived, but, being blind, she could not describe her attacker. Similar murders took place in Ulyanovsk, Nizhny Novgorod, Izhevsk, Perm (two in April 2012) and Samara (two in April–May 2012). By 1 August 2012, there were eighteen murders. Between 25 and 27 September 2012, the last three murders were committed in Ufa. The total number of murders was originally suspected to be 32.

On 26 September 2012, the alleged perpetrator was captured on a CCTV camera at the entrance of one of the victims' homes. Following this, a facial composite was created.

== Investigation ==
In 2013, a reward of 1 million rubles was promised in return for information beneficial to the investigation. In the same year, a theory was put forward that the killer was hiding in Sakhalin Oblast.

On 6 February 2017, the Deputy Head of the Main Criminalistics Directorate of the Criminal Investigation Service of the Russian Federation, Ivan Streltsov, told reporters that the investigators had reason to believe that the person being sought was a resident of Udmurtia.

On 28 March 2017, a 37-year-old Kazakh native was arrested in Samara on suspicion of involvement in the murders, as he had killed two elderly women there on 25 and 27 March 2017.

On 25 May 2017, investigators suggested that the offender was a native of Tatarstan and studied in one of Kazan's schools.

== Arrest, trial and imprisonment ==
On 1 December 2020, Tagirov was detained and confessed to at least 25 of the murders. DNA evidence and shoe prints were used to identify him as the murderer. He claimed to have killed the victims "painlessly" in order to survive on the streets. He later recanted his confession, claiming that he slandered himself under stress.

Tagirov's trial began in October 2022. On 21 March 2024, he was sentenced to life in prison for 31 murders, several attempted murders, and 34 assaults.

== See also ==
- List of Russian serial killers
- List of serial killers by number of victims
