= Vladimir Ageyev =

Russian painter (1932–2024)

Vladimir Ivanovich Ageev (Russian: Владимир Иванович Агеев; April 2, 1932 – January 3, 2024) was a Soviet and Russian Chuvash painter. He was a Chuvash people artist, a Merited Artist of Chuvash Republic, a member of the USSR painters Union (1970), and a winner of the Chuvash State Konstantin Ivanov's prize.

== Biography ==
Ageev was born on April 2, 1932, in the village of Man Yalchiki of the Yalchiksky District in Chuvashia, USSR. From 1948 to 1956, he studied in Cheboksary Art School. He died on January 3, 2024, at the age of 91.

== Works ==
1. "Елчĕкри пасар" Базар в Яльчиках/Market in Yalchiki (1985)
2. "Касу" Стадо/ The flok (1985)
3. "Пăрттă Кĕçтентинĕ вăйă картинче, 1912 ç." К. В. Иванов на празднике хоровода/ Konstantin Ivanov in chorus holiday in 1912 year
4. (1989); "Чăвашсем вăйă картинче" Чувашский хоровод/Chuvash chorus holiday (1971)
5. "Маçак каласа панăччĕ" Как рассказывал дед/Grandfather talking (1972)
6. "Çăлкуç патĕнче" У родника/Spring (hydrosphere) (1985)
7. "Хальхи юрă" Современная песня/Contemporary song (1996).

== Literature ==
- Трофимов, А. А. В. И. Агеев : Начало творческого пути. Мировоззрение
