= Russian Special Forces University =

Private university

- Established: 1 August 2013
- Location: Rostovskaya street 2/2, Gudermes, Chechnya, Russia; 43°19′42″N 46°3′11″E
- Website: ruspetsnaz.ru

The Russian Special Forces University named after Vladimir Putin (Russian: Российский университет спецназа и́мени В. В. Пу́тина, romanized: Rossiysky universitet spetsnaza imeni V. V. Putina) is a private university in Chechnya, devoted to the training of special forces.

== History ==
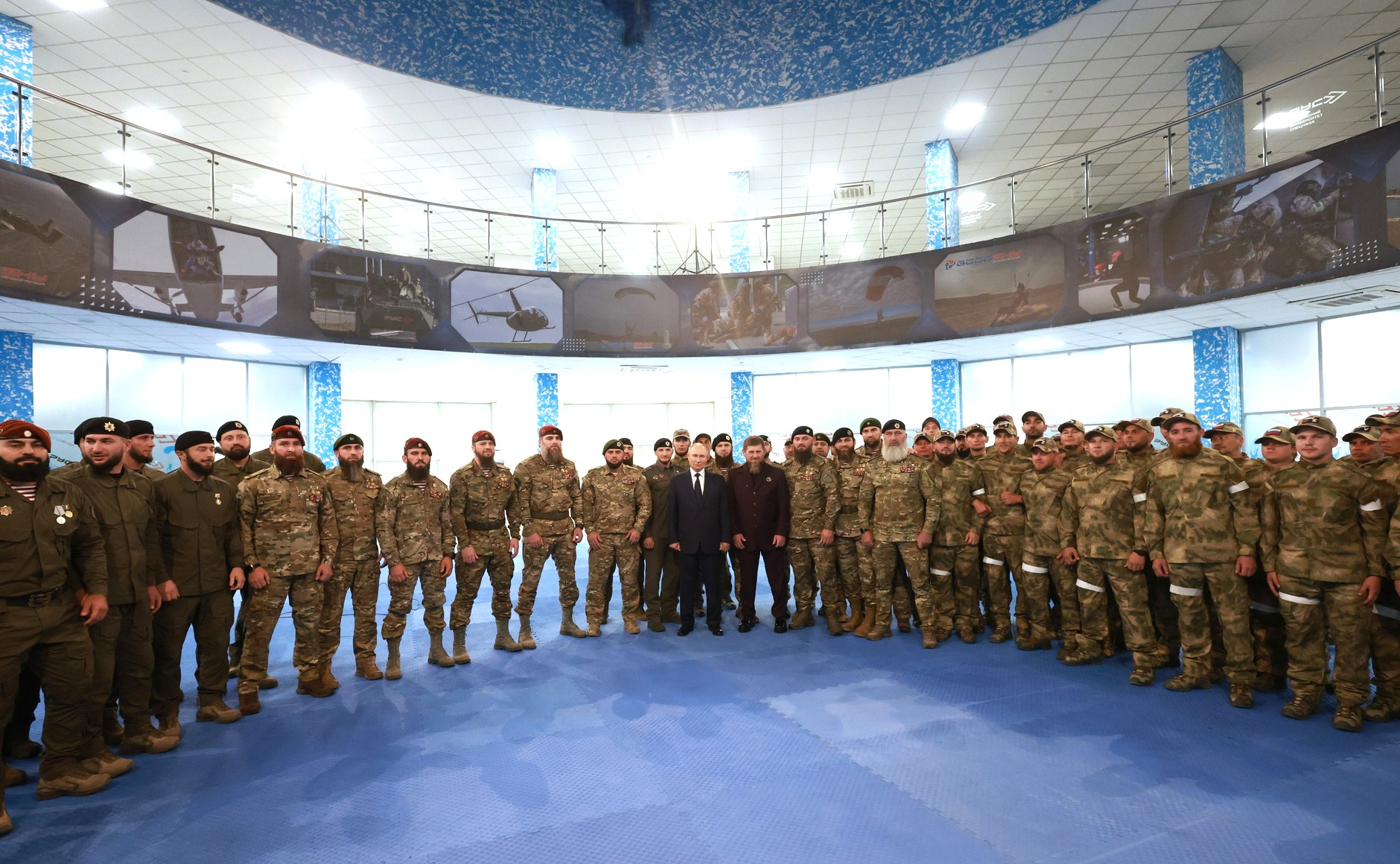
Vladimir Putin and Ramzan Kadyrov at the Russian Special Forces University, 20 August 2024

In 2013, the Head of the Chechen Republic, Ramzan Kadyrov, proposed creation of a multifunctional complex in Russia to combine modern methods and techniques of training in special tactical disciplines. The university was founded as a private company with its construction project curated by Deputy Head of National Guard of Russia in Chechen Republic Daniil Martynov. On February 20, 2024, Ramzan Kadyrov announced in his Telegram channel that the university will be named after Russian President Vladimir Putin.

During the Russian invasion of Ukraine, the university's roof was set on fire in a drone attack on 29 October 2024.

== Instructors team ==
The university's instructor team of certified specialists, led by Daniil Martynov, has experience in the preparation and execution of special operations. Some of the instructors are veterans of the counter-terrorism task force group «Alpha» of the Russian Federal Security Service, many of them with state awards for completed operations. The instructors are serving officers of Russian National Guard in the Chechen Republic, while the department itself was formed based on Department of National Guard of Russia in Chechen Republic. Department specialists are able to carry out complex missions. The instructors share their extensive experience with other special forces troops of Russia as well as friendly states.

== Infrastructure ==
The large-scale university project is located in Gudermes on a training area of over 400 hectares. The training area encompasses a multi-purpose complex of 95 buildings and facilities.

=== Shooting premises ===
Provision of special-tactical and shooting training is the main focus of the university's activity.

=== Tactical pond ===
With water mirror are of 2 hectares (4.9 acres) and depth of 10 metres (33 ft). Professional scuba divers who will practice in the pond have the necessary conditions for underwater shooting, water-to-surface shooting, gearless insertion into the water, and activities related to vessel release from the pirates.

=== Airborne training ===
The university's facilities for airborne training include a runway with a length 1,600 m (5,200 ft) and a drop zone. An aerodynamic complex building is intended for paratroopers training in an aerodynamic tunnel 5 m (16 ft) in diameter.

== Training Programs ==
The academic process and the infrastructure at the university is organized for both military training and for civilian sports directions.

	MILITARY-APPLIED DIRECTION	CIVILIAN DIRECTION
Main disciplines	Fire training	Shooting Sports, Sporting
Main disciplines	Flying and airborne training, UAV (Unmanned aerial vehicles)	Parachuting, paragliding sport
Main disciplines	Combat diving	Diving
Main disciplines	Mountain training, altitude training and mountaineering assault	Climbing, Industrial climbing, mountaineering
Main disciplines	Tactical-special training	Airsoft, paintball
Main disciplines	State security	School of bodyguards
Associated / related subjects	Martial arts	Fitness, fighting, CrossFit
Associated / related subjects	Military medical training	First aid course
Associated / related subjects	Military canine training	Civil dog training
Associated / related subjects	Extreme driving	Counter accident driving
Associated / related subjects	Engineering training	
Associated / related subjects	Training of military journalists	
Associated / related subjects	IT training	

== Gallery ==
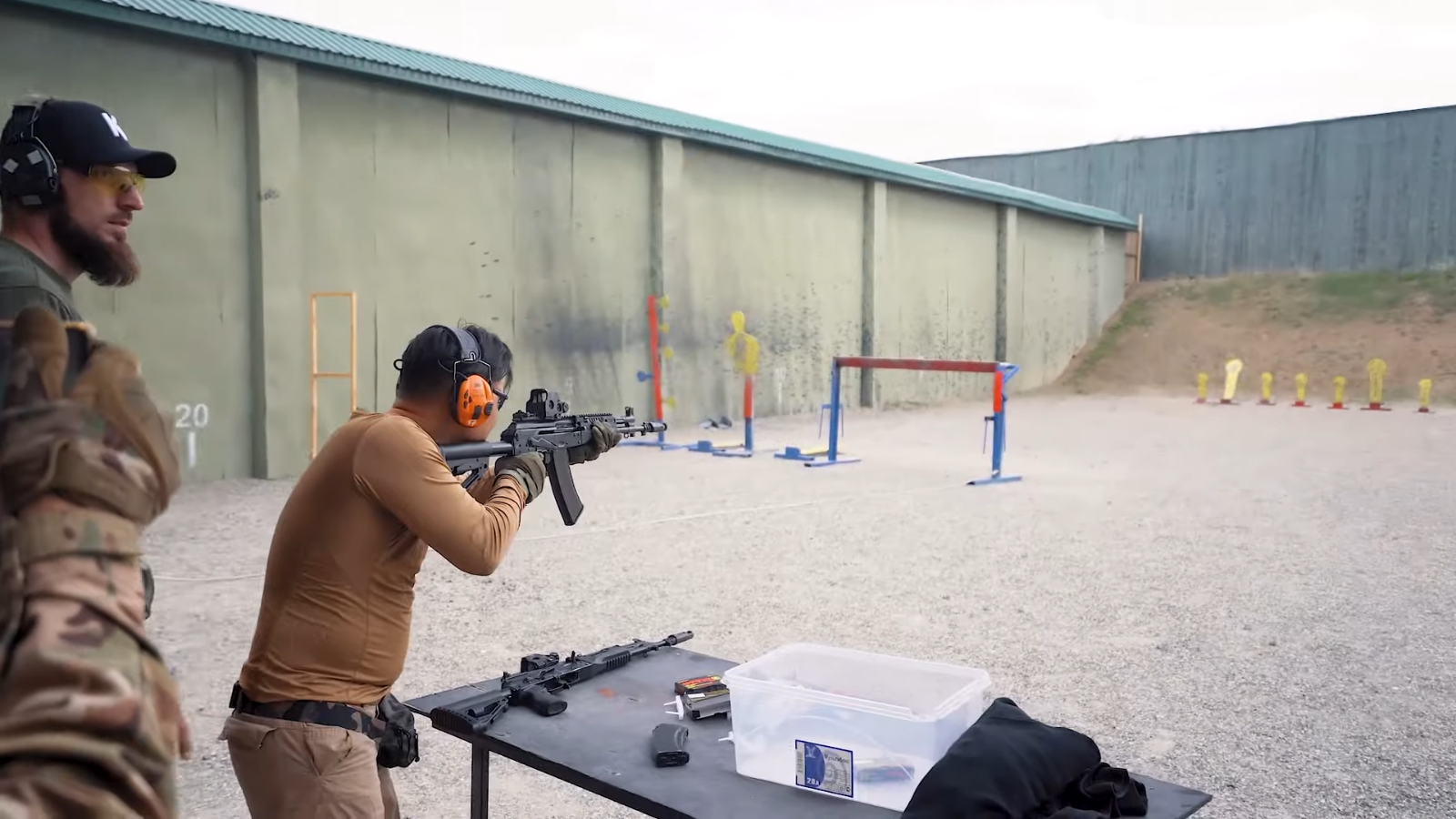

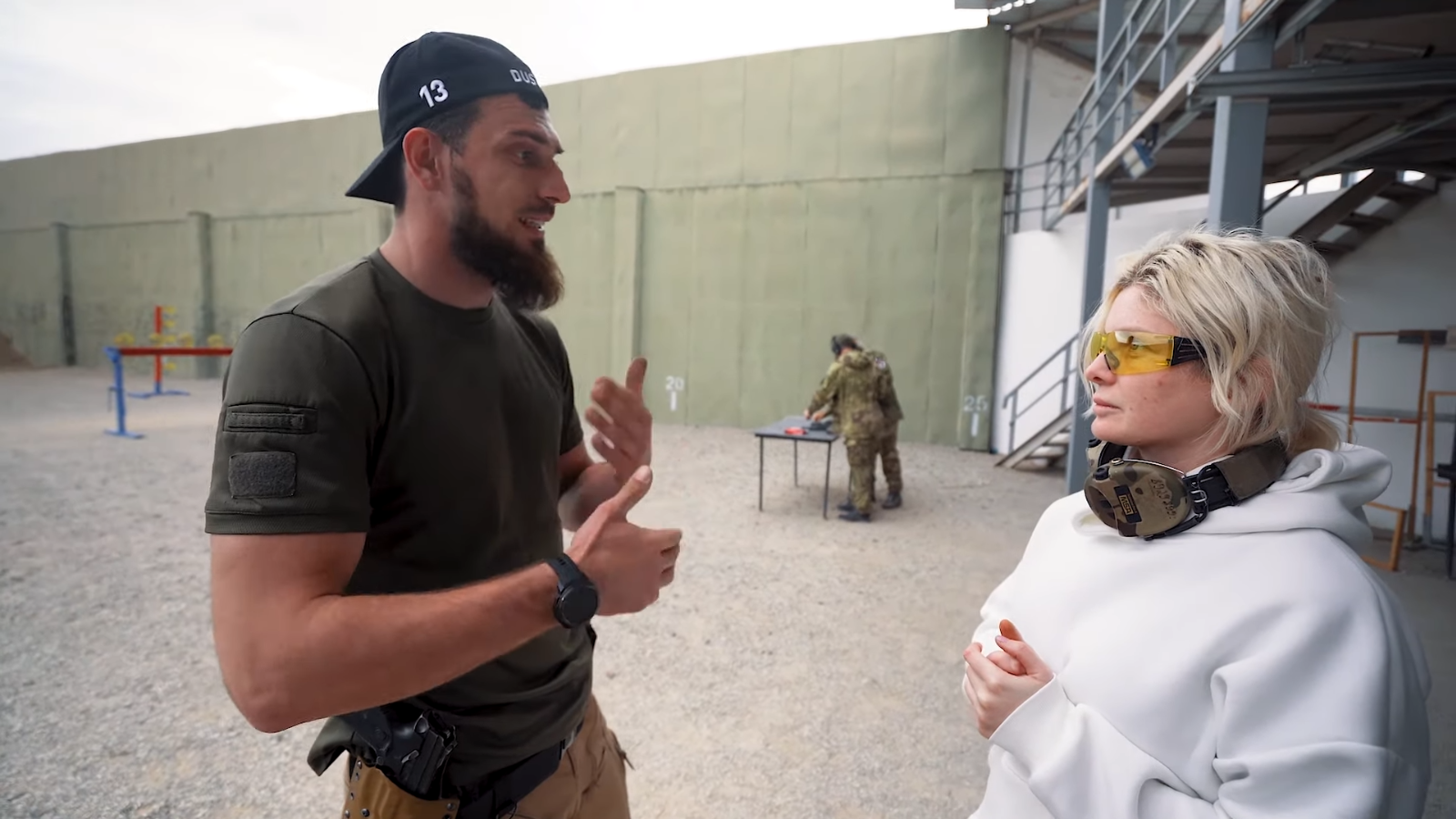

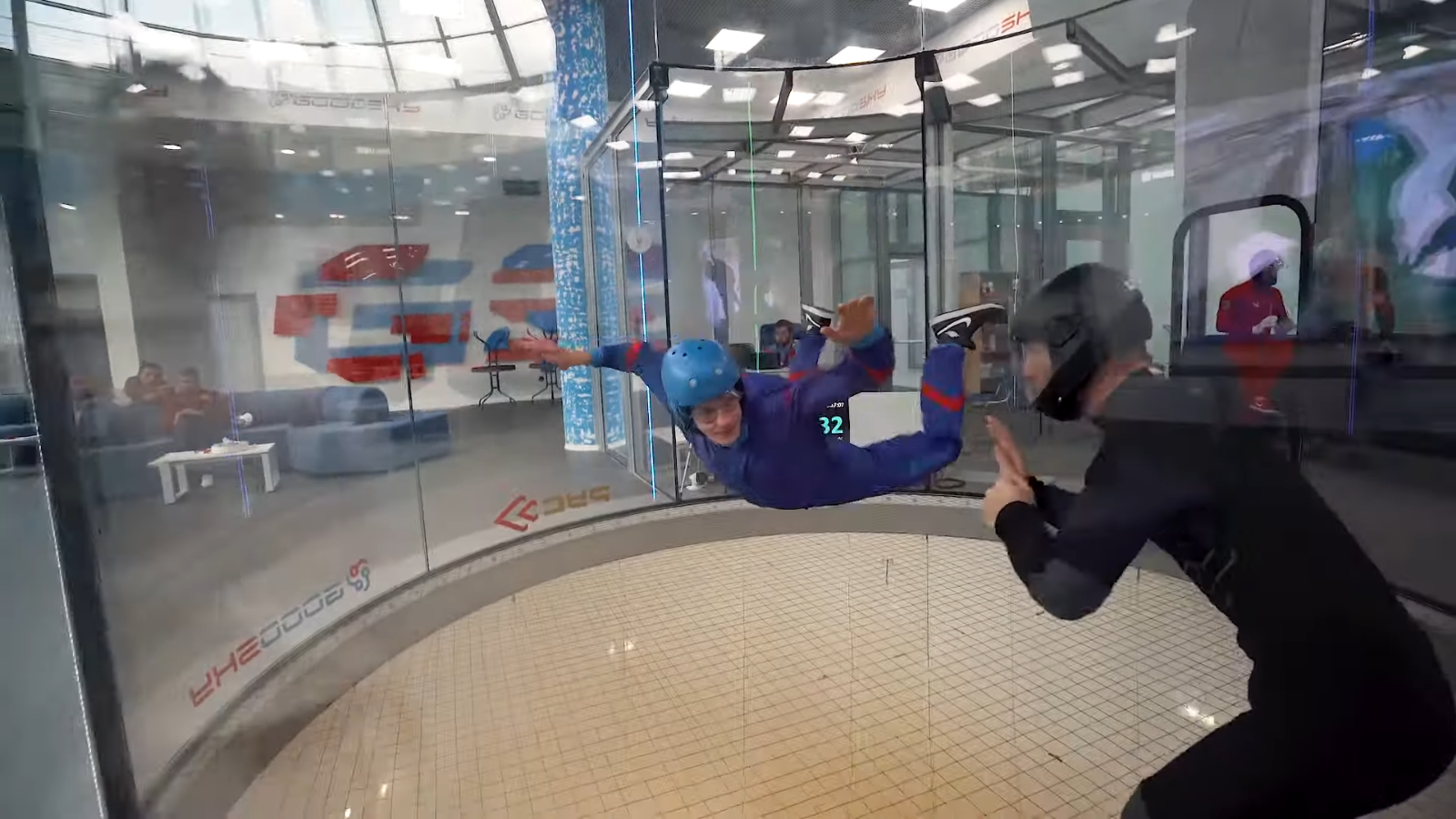

== Achievements ==
=== Maneuvers at the North Pole ===
In April 2016, a team composed of the Russian National Guard Troops "Flying Squad" members, who were trained at a special program developed by the university's instructors with the support from the Russian Geographic Society, held a military tactical training exercise in the Arctic. Under the guidance of the instructors, the team landed on the North Pole three times to practice different methods of special-purpose exercises in severe Arctic conditions over the course of three weeks. This training was intended to provide methodological practical experience in relation to special operations drilling in the Polar conditions.

=== "Chaborz" Buggy Production Startup ===
In March 2017 the university's instructors team guided the production of the first combat buggies «Chaboz M-3» in Chechnya. «Chaboz M-3» is intended for transportation of troops and cargo in difficult terrain, with high speed and high ride comfort. Currently the buggies are used in training maneurves of troops in Russia, and some have been supplied to Syria.

=== Tactical Shooting Championship among Special Forces Units ===
In May 2017 in Tactical City at the university was held V Open Championship of the Chechen Republic – a competition for the various law enforcement structures of Russia.
