= Assassination of Vladlen Tatarsky =

2023 killing of a Russian military blogger

- Camera footage from the explosion
- Assassination of Vladlen Tatarsky (European Russia) Assassination of Vladlen Tatarsky (Central Saint Petersburg)
- Location: 59°56′12″N 30°17′12″E; Universitetskaya Embankment 25, Street Food Bar №1 café, Saint Petersburg, Russia
- Date: 2 April 2023
- Attack type: Bombing
- Weapon: Improvised explosive device
- Deaths: 1
- Injuries: 42
- Perpetrator: Darya Trepova
- No. of participants: 1
- Motive: Opposition to the Russian invasion of Ukraine (suspected)
- Verdict: Guilty, sentenced to 27 years imprisonment

On 2 April 2023, a bombing occurred in the Street Food Bar No.1 café on Universitetskaya Embankment in Saint Petersburg, Russia. Russian military blogger Vladlen Tatarsky, real name Maxim Fomin, died as a result of the explosion and 42 people were injured, 24 of whom were hospitalized, including six in critical conditions.

Russia accused Ukraine of being behind the attack and labelled it a "terrorist act", while Ukraine blamed the attack on "domestic terrorism". The National Republican Army also claimed responsibility for the attack. Later, Vasyl Malyuk, the head of the Security Service of Ukraine, indirectly confirmed Ukraine's involvement in the assassination.

Darya Trepova was convicted of the murder in 2024.

== Background ==
In 2022 and 2023, a number of Russian businessmen were found dead under suspicious circumstances. In addition, Ukraine was accused of being behind attacks against pro-war figures, such as in the killing of Darya Dugina.

Vladlen Tatarsky was an influential Russian military blogger with more than 560,000 followers on Telegram. Before his death, he criticized Russia's strategy in the Russian invasion of Ukraine but was also a staunch supporter of the invasion.

The café where the explosion occurred belonged to Yevgeny Prigozhin. The Cyber Z Front discussion club gathered there on weekends.

== Explosion ==
According to several sources, including Russian authorities, Vladlen Tatarsky was offered a statuette by a woman, which is thought to have subsequently exploded. The power of the explosives inside of the statuette was reportedly more than 200g of TNT equivalent. The explosion caused the front of the café to collapse. Police were called to the scene at 18:13 local time.

== Victims ==
According to the Ministry of Health, one person (Tatarsky) died. By the evening of 2 April, the number of wounded rose to 42. Twenty-four wounded were taken to medical institutions in Saint Petersburg from the café. The condition of six wounded people was assessed as serious.

== Suspects ==
Russian law enforcement agencies started investigating the incident shortly after it occurred.

A resident of Saint Petersburg, Darya Yevgenyevna Trepova (born 16 February 1997), was considered as a suspect by the Investigative Committee. Investigators believed that she brought to the café a box with a bust of Tatarsky, in which an explosive device was mounted. She had earlier been detained for 10 days, along with her husband, after attending an anti-war protest against the Russian invasion of Ukraine on 24 February 2022 for apparently ignoring police orders to disperse. Russian officials also claimed she was an "active supporter" of jailed opposition leader Alexei Navalny.

On the next day, in the morning of 3 April, the Investigative Committee announced that she had been detained after being placed on the wanted list earlier that day. Trepova's husband, Dmitry Rylov, said that she was detained at the apartment of his friend Dmitry Kasintsev, who was also detained, according to The Insider. Russian authorities did not confirm a second detention. Rylov, a member of the fringe opposition Libertarian Party of Russia, stated that "she would never kill" and that he believed she was framed.

In a video released by the Ministry of Internal Affairs, Trepova confessed to bringing in the statuette but unconfirmed reports by Russian media stated that she had told investigators that she had been set up and was unaware that the statuette had contained a bomb. In the video, she appeared to agree that she brought the statuette to the café, but didn't answer to the interrogation about the origin of the statuette.

Russian officials said that the possibility of Trepova being conned was not ruled out.

Russia accused Ukraine of organising the attack; the National Anti-terrorism Committee accused Ukrainian intelligence services and supporters of Alexei Navalny of being behind the attack, echoed by Kremlin spokesperson Dmitry Peskov, who called it a "terrorist act". Ukrainian presidential advisor Mykhailo Podolyak blamed the attack on "domestic terrorism" and "an internal political fight", while Navalny's allies rejected the accusation and said it was more likely Russia's own intelligence services were behind the attack.

Yevgeny Prigozhin, the head of the Wagner Group, paid tribute to Tatarsky in a video after the attack. He also said that he would not blame the Ukrainian government for the attack, instead saying he believed there was a group of radicals.

On 4 April, the National Republican Army (NRA), which previously claimed to be behind the killing of Darya Dugina in August 2022, claimed responsibility for the attack. The NRA did not provide any evidence for its claim.

== Investigation and legal proceedings ==
The Investigative Committee of Russia opened a criminal case under article 105 of the Criminal Code of Russia which criminalizes acts of murder. The next day, the Investigative Committee decided to change the article to article 205, which criminalizes acts of terrorism.

On 4 April, Trepova was charged by the Investigative Committee under the criminal code with a "terrorist act committed by an organized group that resulted in the deliberate infliction of death on a person" and the "illegal carrying of explosive devices committed by an organized group". Terrorism can carry a life sentence in Russia, though this does not apply to women. Consequently, Trepova faces up to 20 years in a penal colony if convicted. She was initially remanded in custody with a release date of 2 June, but that was subsequently extended to 3 September. Trepova was brought before a court on 15 November, to be charged with carrying out a terrorist attack, illegal trafficking of explosive devices and forging documents.

On 25 January 2024, Trepova was sentenced to 27 years in prison, one of the longest prison sentences ever given to a woman in modern Russian history.

== Aftermath ==
President Vladimir Putin awarded the Order of Courage to Tatarsky posthumously.

On March 25, 2024, Vasyl Malyuk, the head of the Security Service of Ukraine (SBU), provided detailed comments on the assassination of Vladlen Tatarsky during a television interview with Ukraine's ICTV channel. While he explicitly stated that the SBU would not officially claim responsibility, his remarks have been widely interpreted as a de facto admission of the agency's role in the operation.

== See also ==
- List of terrorist incidents in 2023
- Darya Dugina
