= Vladlen Tatarsky =

Russian military blogger (1982–2023)

- Владлен Татарский
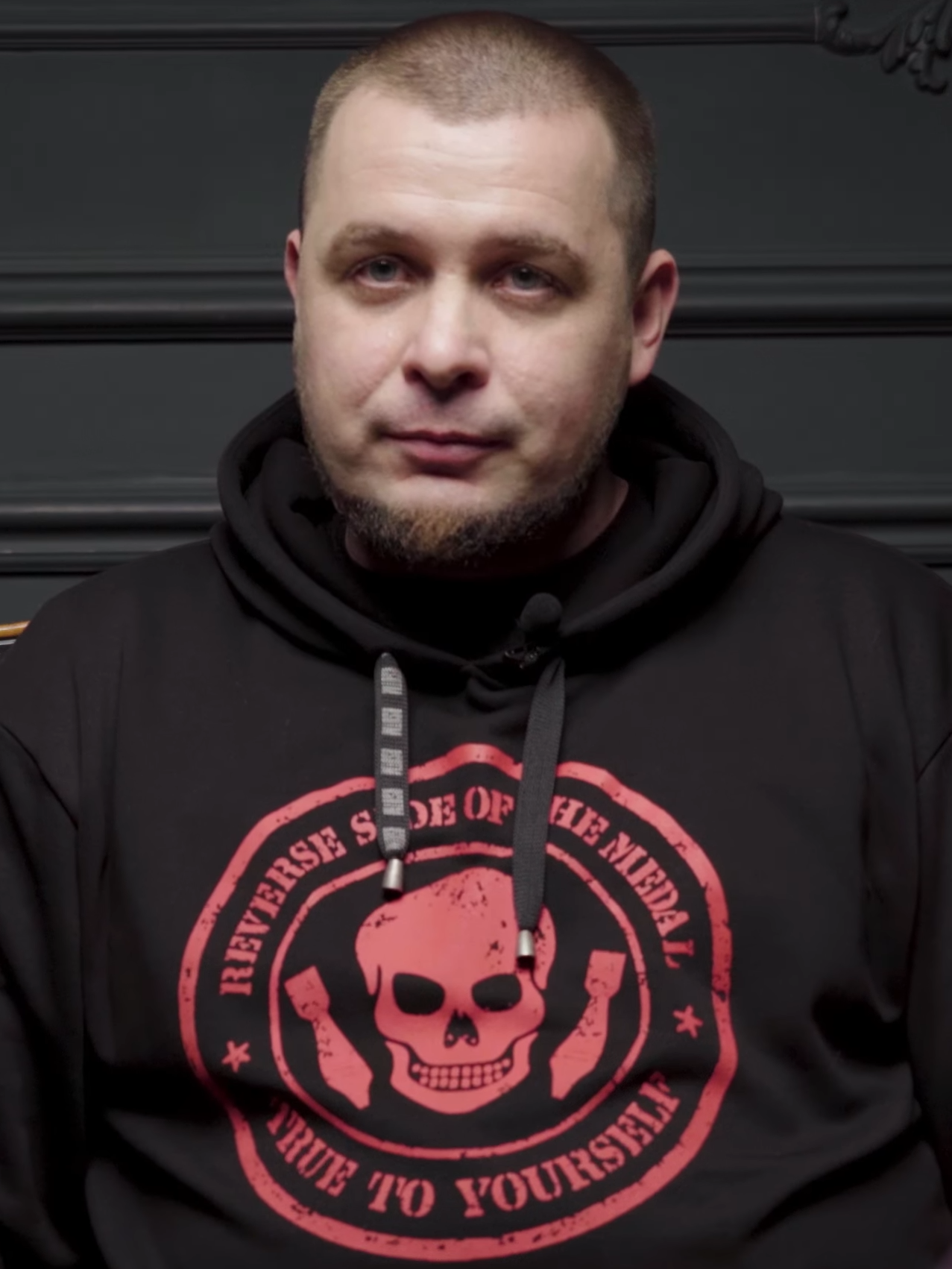
- Tatarsky in 2021
- Born: Maxim Yuryevich Fomin (Note: Russian: Максим Юрьевич Фомин, Ukrainian: Максим Юрійович Фомін, romanized: Maksym Yuriiovych Fomin); 25 April 1982; Makiivka, Ukrainian SSR, Soviet Union
- Died: 2 April 2023 (aged 40); Saint Petersburg, Russia
- Cause of death: Bomb explosion
- Resting place: Troyekurovskoye Cemetery
- Occupation: Blogger
- Awards: Order of Courage (posthumous); Medal "For the Liberation of Mariupol" (posthumous)
- Vladlen Tatarsky's voice Recorded February 2021

Maxim Yuryevich Fomin (25 April 1982 – 2 April 2023), better known as Vladlen Tatarsky, (Note: Russian: Владлен Татарский; Ukrainian: Владлен Татарський.) was a Ukrainian-born Russian military blogger, propagandist, convicted bank robber, and participant in the Russo-Ukrainian War.

Tatarsky was active as a propagandist for Russia and the separatist forces in Ukraine until he was assassinated in a bombing in Saint Petersburg in April 2023.

== Prison and war ==
Maxim Yuryevich Fomin was born in Makiivka, Donetsk Oblast, on 25 April 1982. He held Ukrainian and later Russian citizenship. He was of Tatar descent on the side of his mother, Ravilya Ibragimova. In 2011, he was imprisoned in Ukraine for bank robbery. While the war in Donbas broke out, he broke out of prison and joined the Russia-backed Donetsk People's Republic's Militia. Later, he was caught and eventually imprisoned again.

Fomin was pardoned by Alexander Zakharchenko, the head of the Donetsk People's Republic, and was given the opportunity to fight against the Ukrainian army alongside the Vostok Battalion during the war in Donbas. His nom de guerre was "Professor". After serving in the military, around 2017, he started blogging under the pseudonym Vladlen Tatarsky. The name is an allusion to both Lenin (Vladimir Lenin) and Russian satirist Victor Pelevin's 1999 novel, Generation "П", where the name of the protagonist is Vavilen Tatarsky (Babylen Tatarsky in the English translation). This Tatarsky is an advertising copywriter who is enlisted to write copy at an ad agency, where he adapts Western advertising to the "Russian mentality".

Reflecting on the war in Donbas, Fomin wrote that "thousands of Russian officers" had served in the region since October 2014, thereby contradicting the official Russian position that the Russian Federation was not involved militarily in mainland Ukraine before 2022. Tatarsky lived in Moscow from 2019 until his death in 2023.

== Telegram channel ==
Tatarsky was a prominent figure among the Russian military bloggers, a group known for their uncompromising support of the Russo-Ukrainian War. The popularity of his Telegram channel significantly increased after the Russian invasion of Ukraine in February 2022, reaching over 560,000 by the time of his assassination. He was also invited to political shows on the state television. Tatarsky was known for his hardline views, criticising Russian military commanders and Vladimir Putin for being too soft in their approach. The Institute for the Study of War characterised him as a "prominent" military blogger, but not exceptionally so. While he maintained ties to the Wagner Group and its founder Yevgeny Prigozhin, he did not also alienate supporters of Vladimir Putin.

In 2016 and 2017, Tatarsky's blogging was mostly interviews with field commanders and events on the front line, where he quite openly wrote about alcohol and drug abuse as well as looting among Russian soldiers in Donbas. He may have introduced the term "orcs" to describe fighters on both sides. In 2022, he was invited to write for RT and became a co-host with Mikhail Zvinchuk ("Rybar") at Vladimir Solovyov's analytical show "Rybar's Analysis". During that period his position became aligned with the official line of the Kremlin. He was more optimistic than many other pro-Russian writers on Telegram—for example, he believed Russia could keep control of Kherson.

As a blogger, Tatarsky called for more attacks on Ukrainian infrastructure which would result in more Ukrainian casualties. He regularly referred to Ukraine as a "terrorist state" and advocated for its defeat. In one infamous video, he was recorded saying, "We'll defeat everyone, we'll kill everyone, we'll rob everyone we need to. Everything will be the way we like it." The video was recorded at the Kremlin, to which Tatarsky had been invited to attend Putin's announcement of "partial mobilization" on 30 September 2022. Tatarsky also produced jihadist propaganda, likely also for the pro-war cause. In an interview with Sergey Mardan, Tatarsky explained Ukrainians as "ill Russians", describing them as "spiritual transvestites" who were "born Russians but want to pretend to be someone else".

Due to his views and involvement in the conflict, Tatarsky was sanctioned by Ukraine. He was banned from entering the country for ten years, and any assets belonging to him that were found in Ukraine were confiscated. Despite these sanctions, Tatarsky continued to promote his views and beliefs through his blog and social media channels.

== Assassination ==
On 2 April 2023, Tatarsky was killed in an explosion while attending an event hosted at a café in Saint Petersburg as a guest speaker. His death was caught on video. Twenty-four others were injured, six of them critically, according to Russian authorities. The café was reportedly owned by Yevgeny Prigozhin, a Russian businessman with close ties to the Kremlin and head of the paramilitary Wagner Group. A Saint Petersburg resident, Darya Trepova, was considered a suspect by the Investigative Committee of Russia. According to investigators, she had brought to the café a box with a bust of Tatarsky, in which an explosive device was hidden. On 3 April, she was arrested.

Following the incident, Margarita Simonyan, Tina Kandelaki, and Anton Krasovsky blamed Ukraine for the attack and called for retaliation. Prigozhin suggested that Ukrainian state actors are not responsible, and Ukrainian Mykhailo Podolyak attributed the bombing to Russia. The Institute for the Study of War assessed that the bombing may act as a warning to other Russian commentators to temper their criticism of the conduct of the war, or to intimidate Wagner-aligned actors who could pose threats to Putin, and may serve the Kremlin's goal of controlling the information space.

== Legacy ==
The day after his assassination, Putin posthumously awarded Tatarsky the Russian state Order of Courage.

The burial took place on 8 April 2023 at Moscow's Troyekurovskoye Cemetery.

In July 2023, it was reported that a new militia bearing Tatarsky's name saw combat around the town of New York, Ukraine.

== See also ==
- Darya Dugina – Russian pro-war activist killed in an explosion (d. August 2022)
- Igor Mangushev – assassinated Russian mercenary and propagandist (d. February 2023)
- Andrey Kurshin - Milblogger doxxed for making a joke about Tatarsky's death
