= Aviatik Alliance Aleks-251 =

Aleks-251
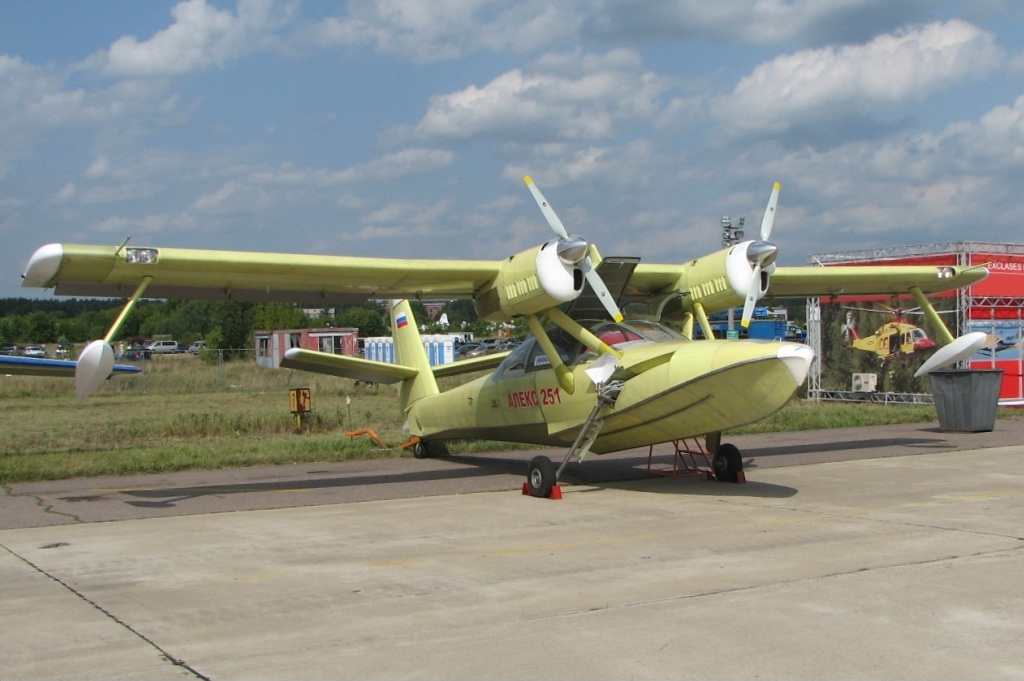

General information
- Type: Six seat amphibious aircraft
- National origin: Russia
- Manufacturer: Aviatik Alliance
- Designer: Aleksey Tantsyrev and Sergey Popov

History
- First flight: 10 September 2010

The Aviatik Alliance Aleks-251 is a twin engine, parasol wing amphibious aircraft designed and built in Russia in the early 2010s. It can carry up to six passengers.

== Design and development ==
The Aleks-251 has had a long development time. The project was first made public in 2003 by the Rida design bureau, who intended to make the first flight in late 2004. There were no further progress reports until the foundation of the Aviatik Alliance Company and the appearance of the near-complete prototype at the Moscow Salon in August 2009. The aircraft flew for the first time on 10 September 2010.

The Aleks-251 is mostly constructed of metal, only using composites in the nosecone, engine cowlings and fin tip. It has a parallel chord, square tipped wing with a full-span combination of slotted ailerons and flaps. The parasol configuration allows the twin 127 kW (170 hp) LOM 332S inverted inline engines to be mounted forward of and under the wing, close together. The wing is braced to the fuselage with a pair of inverted V-struts to the engine mountings.

The hull of the Aleks-251 has a single step and is divided into six watertight compartments. The cabin, 3.10 m (10 ft 2 in) long, 1.40 m (4 ft 7 in) wide and 1.30 m (4 ft 3 in) high seats the pilot and six passengers in three rows, the central one with three seat, the front pair just ahead of the wing leading edge but behind the propeller disks. Other seating configurations, e.g. for medical evacuation with a stretcher and two attendants, are possible. Access is by hinged transparencies. A straight edged, swept back fin carries both the horn-balanced rudder and, at about one-third height, the parallel chord, strongly dihedralled tailplane. The port elevator and, in production aircraft the rudder, have trim tabs.

On water the Aleks-251 is stabilized by a pair of floats, each mounted on a single strut which rotates their float to the wing tip once airborne. On land it has a fully retractable tailwheel undercarriage. The cantilever main legs rotate forwards by much more than 90° to retract the wheels into the upper nose forward of the cabin windscreen. A MVEN ballistic recovery parachute is fitted.

Well before the first flight Aviatik Alliance had announced that production aircraft would have different engines, possibly turboprops, but that a choice had not yet been made.

== Accidents ==
On 9 September 2024, Aviatik Alliance Aleks-251 # RA-1240G crashed during a test flight near Vatulino airfield in Ruza, Moscow Oblast. Both pilots died.

== Specifications ==
Data from Jane's All the World's Aircraft 2011/12

General characteristics

- Crew: 1
- Capacity: up to 6 passengers
- Length: 10.54 m (34 ft 7 in)
- Wingspan: 13.20 m (43 ft 4 in)
- Height: 3.66 m (12 ft 0 in) on land
- Wing area: 19.80 m^{2} (213.1 sq ft) gross
- Empty weight: 1,610 kg (3,549 lb)
- Max takeoff weight: 2,500 kg (5,512 lb) production aircraft; prototype 2,100 kg (4,630 lb)
- Fuel capacity: 700 L (185 US gal, 154 Imp gal)
- Powerplant: 2 × LOM M332S four cylinder piston, 127 kW (170 hp) each in prototype
- Propellers: 2-bladed, 1.855 m (6 ft 1 in) diameter

Performance

- Maximum speed: 240 km/h (150 mph, 130 kn) estimated for production aircraft maximum take-off weight, are the other performance figures
- Cruise speed: 200 km/h (120 mph, 110 kn)
- Stall speed: 95 km/h (59 mph, 51 kn)
- Range: 740 km (460 mi, 400 nmi) with 30 min reserves, 4 passengers
- Ferry range: 2,200 km (1,400 mi, 1,200 nmi)
- Rate of climb: 4.0 m/s (790 ft/min) maximum, at sea level
- Wing loading: 126.3 kg/m^{2} (25.9 lb/sq ft)

Avionics

- Two-screen EFIS, Garmin GNS 430 GPS, Bendix/King KR 87 ADF, L-3 WX 500 Stormscope and Garmin communications systems.
