= Ivan Sergeyev (diplomat) =

Russian diplomat (1941–2024)

Ivan Ivanovich Sergeyev (7 September 1941 – 9 February 2024) was a Russian diplomat who served as Director General of GlavUpDK, the Main Administration for Service to the Diplomatic Corps. He was Ambassador Extraordinary and Plenipotentiary and an Honored Developer of Russia. He was one of the founding fathers of Russian Golf. Sergeyev died on 9 February 2023, at the age of 82.

== See also ==
- Moscow Country Club
