= Valery Vostrotin =

Russian military officer and politician (1952–2024)

- Валерий Востротин
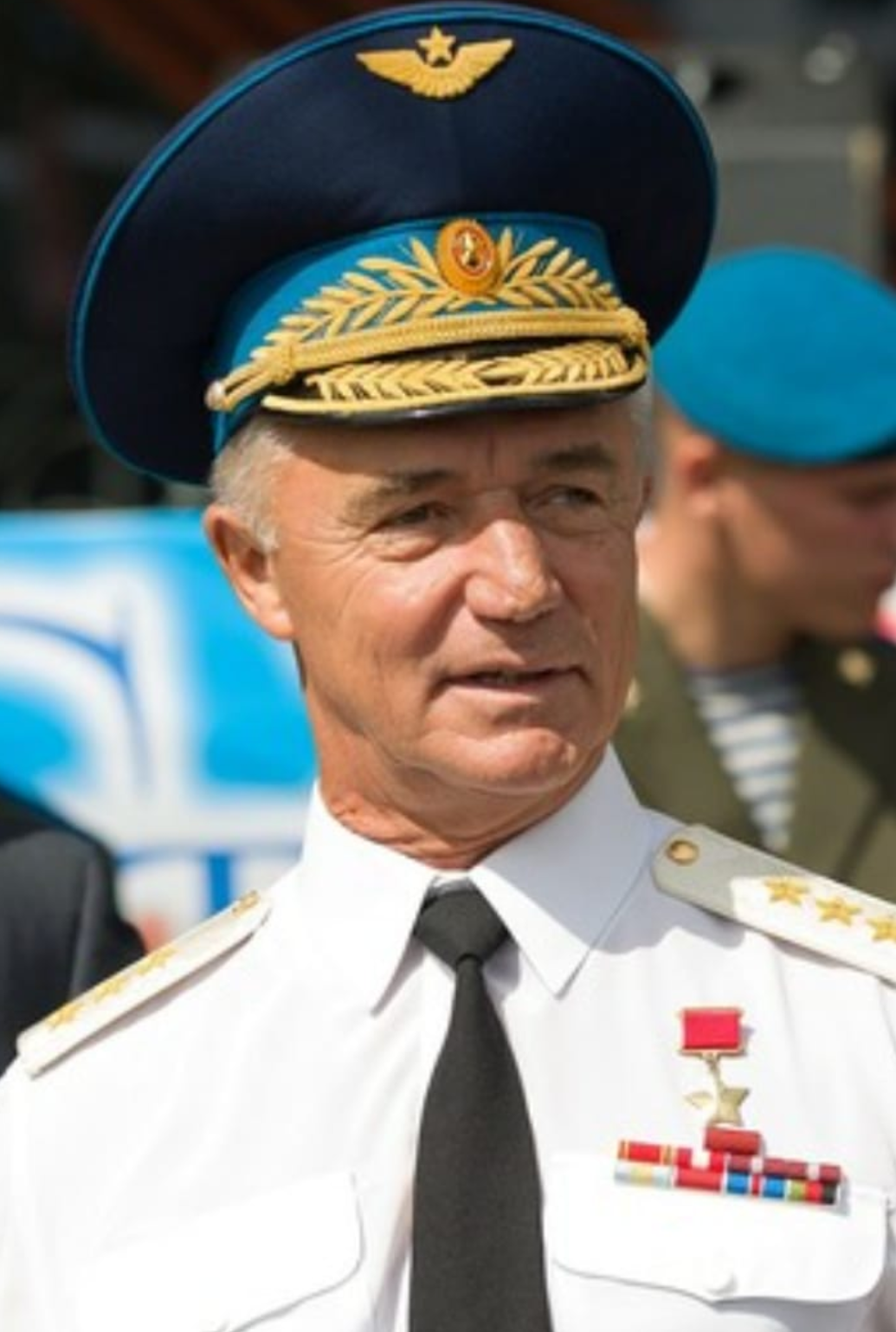
- Vostrotin in 2017

Member of the State Duma
- In office 24 December 2003 – 21 December 2011

Personal details
- Born: Valery Aleksandrovich Vostrotin; 20 November 1952 Kasli, Chelyabinsk Oblast, Russian SFSR, USSR
- Died: 13 February 2024 (aged 71) Moscow Oblast, Russia
- Party: CPSU (until 1991); United Russia
- Education: Yekaterinburg Suvorov Military School; Ryazan Guards Higher Airborne Command School; Frunze Military Academy; Military Academy of the General Staff of the Armed Forces of Russia
- Occupation: Military officer

Military service
- Battles/wars: Soviet-Afghan War

Valery Aleskandrovich Vostrotin (Russian: Вале́рий Алекса́ндрович Востро́тин; 20 November 1952 – 13 February 2024) was a Russian military officer and politician. A member of United Russia, he served in the State Duma from 2003 to 2011.

Vostrotin died in Moscow Oblast on 13 February 2024, at the age of 71. A memorial ceremony was held on 16 February at the Central House of Officers of the Russian Army in Moscow, attended by Minister of Defence Sergei Shoigu. Vostrotin was buried at the Federal Military Memorial Cemetery.
